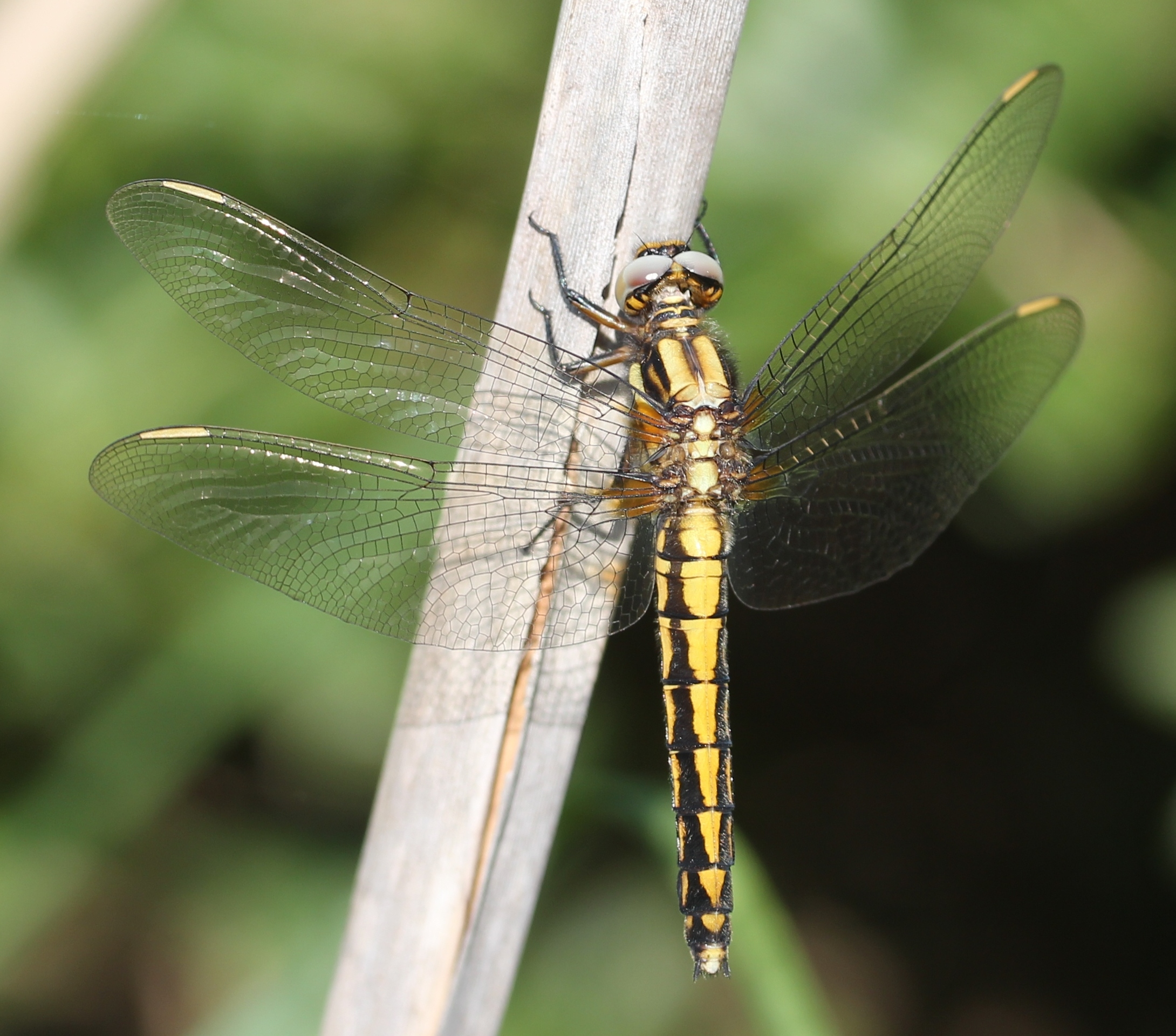
- Female (Aichi Prefecture)
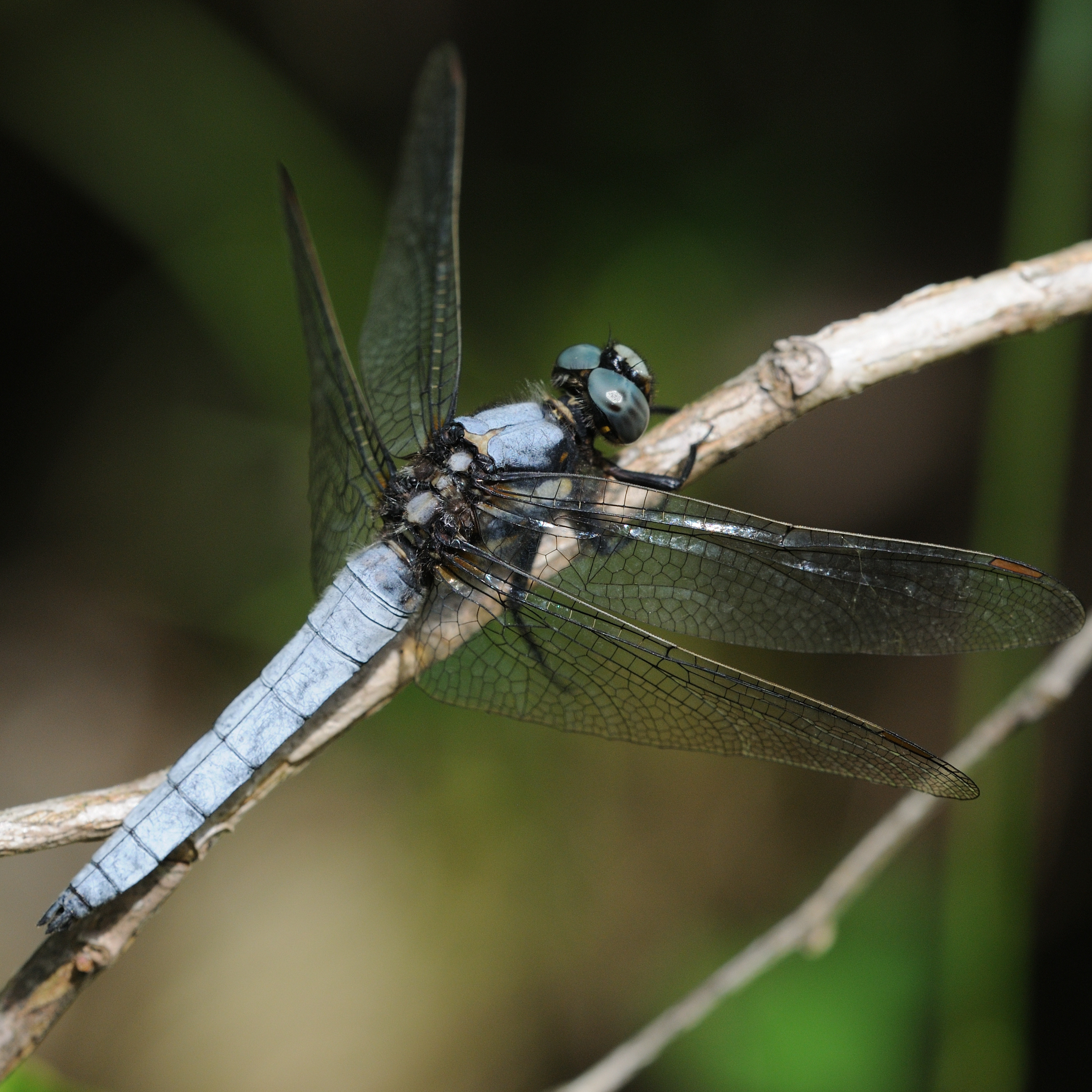
- Male (Hiroshima Prefecture)

Conservation status
- Least Concern (IUCN 3.1) (Note: The IUCN assessment was published in 2010, and therefore considered the old circumscription of the species, which included Orthetrum internum)

Scientific classification
- Kingdom: Animalia
- Phylum: Arthropoda
- Clade: Pancrustacea
- Class: Insecta
- Order: Odonata
- Infraorder: Anisoptera
- Superfamily: Libelluloidea
- Family: Libellulidae
- Genus: Orthetrum
- Species: O. japonicum

Binomial name
- Orthetrum japonicum (Uhler, 1858)

Synonyms
- Libellula japonica Uhler, 1858

= Orthetrum japonicum =

Species of dragonfly

Orthetrum japonicum is a species of libellulid dragonfly endemic to Japan.

== Classification ==
Orthetrum japonicum was first scientifically described as Libellula japonica by Philip Reese Uhler in 1858 from Hakodate, Japan, based on a male specimen only, making it one of the first Japanese odonates to be recognized and described by Europeans.

=== Circumscription ===
In 1894, Robert McLachlan described a variant of the species from Sichuan Province, China, which he dubbed O. japonicum var. internum. He revisited the Chinese dragonfly two years later and raised it to full species level, naming it Orthetrum internum. The newly christened species lasted until 1909, when Friedrich Ris declared the physical differences McLachlan had noted too slight, and lumped it back in with O. japonicum, making it a subspecies. This classification endured throughout the 20th century, although Katsuyoshi Ishida, writing in the 1990s, thought internum a discrete species on the basis of its larvae. A 2012 paper published in the journal Tombo revising the taxonomy of Japanese odonates with genetic techniques looked at the nuclear and mitochondrial genomes of several species, including Orthetrum japonicum. The authors found that O. j. internum was "separated distinctly" from the nominate subspecies, O. j. japonicum; furthermore, while the nuclear DNA tree found internum and japonicum to form a monophyletic clade, the mitochondrial DNA tree found the species O. japonicum to be paraphyletic, as a monophyletic clade including both subspecies would also have to include O. albistylum and O. poecilops. The authors also noted further morphological differences between the subspecies. On this basis the authors revised the status of O. j. internum, raising it back again to species level. A 2020 paper by a researcher at Sogang University, Seoul, noticed that although Korean Orthetrum internum females are like those from Japan, the accessory genitalia of O. internum males are slightly different and in fact looks closer to those of O. japonicum.

== Distribution ==
The distribution of Orthetrum japonicum was significantly changed when the subspecies Orthetrum japonicum internum was split out to form a discrete species in 2012. The range of Orthetrum japonicum, when it included O. internum, was understood to encompass Japan, Taiwan, Myanmar, Nepal, Bhutan, and Pakistan as well as parts of Korea, China, Vietnam, Laos, Thailand, and India. Under the new circumscription, the species is endemic to Japan, as the nominate subspecies, O. j. japonicum, was a Japanese endemic.

Orthetrum japonicum is found from the northern island of Hokkaido through Honshu south to Kyushu. The southernmost extent of the dragonflies' range is the Osumi Islands' Tanegashima near Kyushu.

== Bibliography ==
- Cho, Sungbin (2020). "Taxonomic and biological notes of the South Korean Odonata revised since 2000". Odonatologica. 49. Zenodo: 155–175. doi:10.5281/ZENODO.3823339.
- Karube, H.; Futahashi, R.; et al. (2012). "Taxonomic revision of Japanese odonate species, based on nuclear and mitochondrial gene genealogies and morphological comparison with allied species. Part I". Tombo. 54: 75–106. ISSN 0495-8314.
- McLachlan, Robert (1896). "On Odonata from the province of Szehuen, in Western China, and from Moupin in Eastern Thibet". The Annals and Magazine of Natural History, Including Zoology, Botany, and Geology. 6th series (17): 364–74.
- Subramanian, K.A. (2010). "Taiwan-shioya-tombo (Orthetrum japonicum)". IUCN Red List of Threatened Species. 2010 e.T167357A6333755.
- Uhler, P. R. (1858). "Descriptions of new species of Neuropterous insects, collected by the North Pacific Exploring Expedition under Capt. John Rodgers". Proceedings of the Academy of Natural Sciences of Philadelphia. 10: 29–31.
