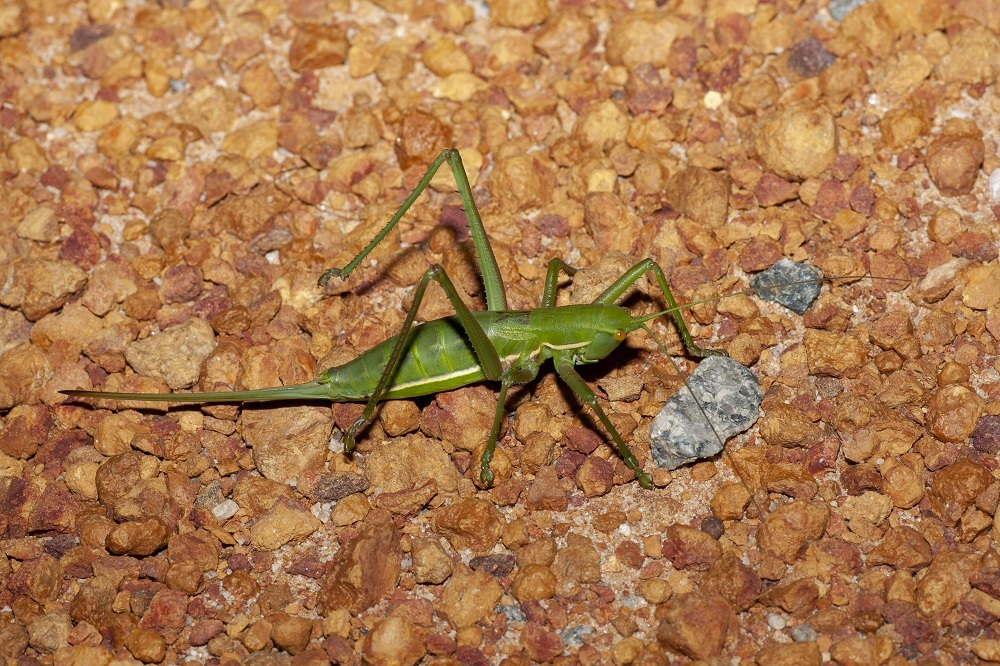
- Hemisaga denticulata

Scientific classification
- Domain: Eukaryota
- Kingdom: Animalia
- Phylum: Arthropoda
- Class: Insecta
- Order: Orthoptera
- Suborder: Ensifera
- Family: Tettigoniidae
- Subfamily: Austrosaginae
- Genus: Hemisaga; Saussure, 1888

Synonyms
- Terpandrulus Brunner von Wattenwyl, 1893; Xiphosaga Saussure, 1888

= Hemisaga =

Genus of cricket-like animals

Hemisaga is a genus of katydids in the family Tettigoniidae. It contains the following species:

- Hemisaga albilinea Rentz, 1993
- Hemisaga allirra Rentz, 1993
- Hemisaga baileyi Rentz, 1993
- Hemisaga denticulata (White, 1841)
- Hemisaga irregularis (Redtenbacher, 1891)
- Hemisaga lanceolata Ander, 1957
- Hemisaga lucifer Rentz, 1993
- Hemisaga lunodonta Rentz, 1993
- Hemisaga mullaya Rentz, 1993
- Hemisaga pericalles Rentz, 1993
- Hemisaga saussurei Brancsik, 1895
- Hemisaga undulata Rentz, 1993
- Hemisaga venator Rentz, 1993
- Hemisaga vepreculae Rentz, 1993
