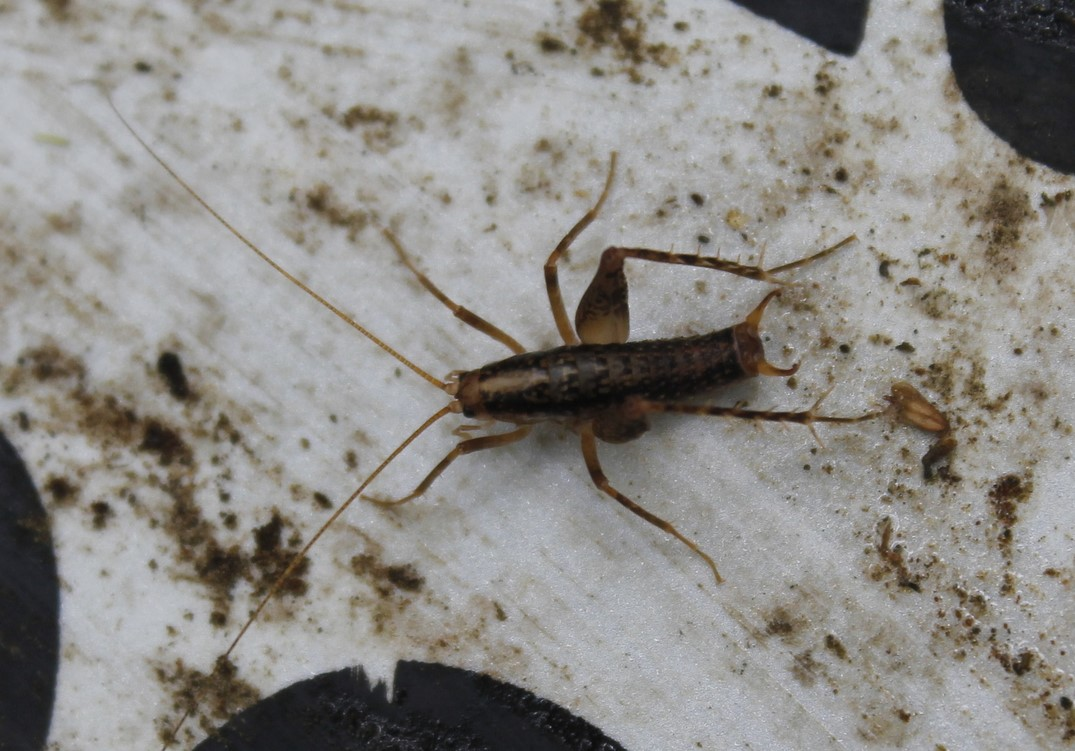

Scientific classification
- Domain: Eukaryota
- Kingdom: Animalia
- Phylum: Arthropoda
- Class: Insecta
- Order: Orthoptera
- Suborder: Ensifera
- Family: Rhaphidophoridae
- Genus: Pristoceuthophilus
- Species: P. cercalis

Binomial name
- Pristoceuthophilus cercalis Caudell, 1916

= Pristoceuthophilus cercalis =

Species of insect

Pristoceuthophilus cercalis is a species of camel cricket in the family Rhaphidophoridae. It is found in North America.
