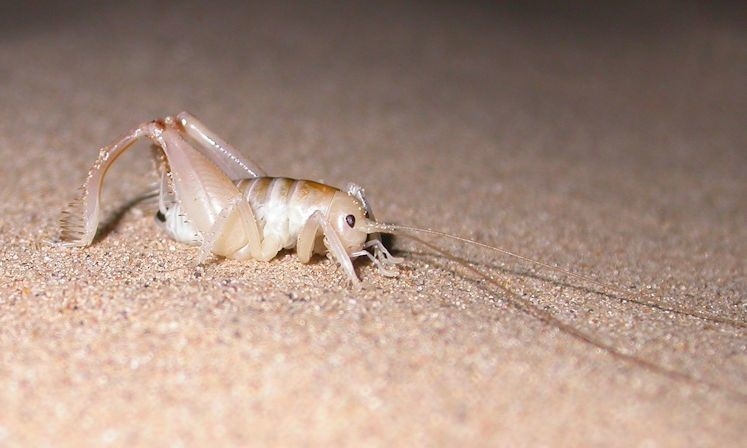

Scientific classification
- Domain: Eukaryota
- Kingdom: Animalia
- Phylum: Arthropoda
- Class: Insecta
- Order: Orthoptera
- Suborder: Ensifera
- Family: Rhaphidophoridae
- Subfamily: Ceuthophilinae
- Genus: Macrobaenetes
- Species: M. algodonensis

Binomial name
- Macrobaenetes algodonensis Tinkham, 1962

= Macrobaenetes algodonensis =

Species of cricket-like animal

Macrobaenetes algodonensis, the algodones sand treader cricket, is a species of camel cricket in the family Rhaphidophoridae. It is found in North America.
