= Chloealtis =

Scientific classification
- Kingdom: Animalia
- Phylum: Arthropoda
- Clade: Pancrustacea
- Class: Insecta
- Order: Orthoptera
- Suborder: Caelifera
- Family: Acrididae
- Subfamily: Gomphocerinae
- Genus: Chloealtis; Harris, 1841

Genus of grasshoppers

Chloealtis is a genus of slant-faced grasshoppers in the family Acrididae. There are about five described species in Chloealtis.

== Species ==
These five species belong to the genus Chloealtis:

- Chloealtis abdominalis (Thomas, 1873)^{i c g b} (Rocky Mountain sprinkled locust)
- Chloealtis aspasma Rehn & Hebard, 1919^{i c g b} (Siskiyou slant-face grasshopper)
- Chloealtis conspersa (Harris, 1841)^{i c g b} (sprinkled grasshopper)
- Chloealtis dianae (Gurney, Strohecker & Helfer, 1964)^{i c g b} (Diana black-side grasshopper)
- Chloealtis gracilis (McNeill, 1897)^{i c g b} (graceful slant-face grasshopper)

Data sources: i = ITIS, c = Catalogue of Life, g = GBIF, b = Bugguide.net
