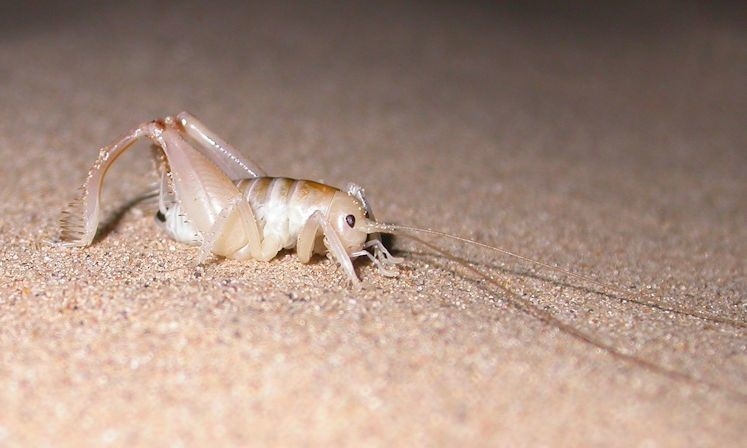
- Macrobaenetes algodonensis

Scientific classification
- Domain: Eukaryota
- Kingdom: Animalia
- Phylum: Arthropoda
- Class: Insecta
- Order: Orthoptera
- Suborder: Ensifera
- Family: Rhaphidophoridae
- Subfamily: Ceuthophilinae
- Genus: Macrobaenetes; Tinkham, 1962

= Macrobaenetes =

Genus of cricket-like animals

Macrobaenetes is a genus of sand-treader crickets in the family Rhaphidophoridae, found in California. There are at least four described species in Macrobaenetes.

== Species ==
These species belong to the genus Macrobaenetes:

- Macrobaenetes algodonensis Tinkham, 1962 (Algodones sand treader cricket)
- Macrobaenetes kelsoensis Tinkham, 1962 (Kelso Dunes giant sand-treader cricket)
- Macrobaenetes sierrapintae Tinkham, 1962 (Sierra Pinta giant sand-treader cricket)
- Macrobaenetes valgum (Strohecker, 1960) (Coachella giant sand-treader cricket)
