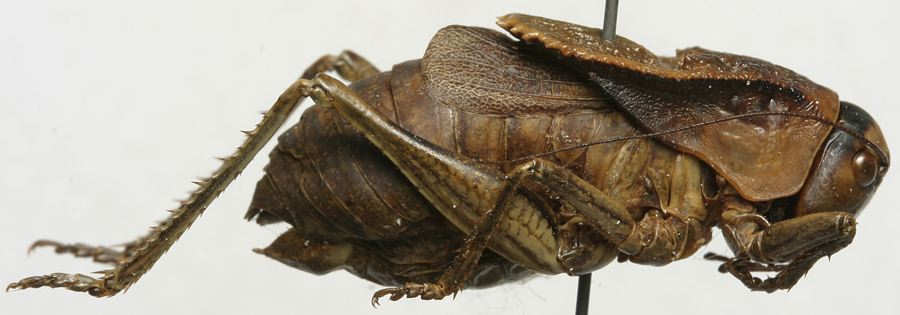
- Onconotus servillei

Scientific classification
- Domain: Eukaryota
- Kingdom: Animalia
- Phylum: Arthropoda
- Class: Insecta
- Order: Orthoptera
- Suborder: Ensifera
- Family: Tettigoniidae
- Subfamily: Tettigoniinae
- Tribe: Onconotini; Tarbinsky, 1940
- Genus: Onconotus; Fischer von Waldheim, 1839

= Onconotus =

Genus of cricket-like animals

Onconotus is a genus of bush cricket in the subfamily Tettigoniinae. It is the only representative of the monotypic tribe Onconotini and species have been recorded from eastern Europe and western Asia.

== Species ==
The Orthoptera Species File includes the following species:

1. Onconotus laxmanni (Pallas, 1771) - type species
2. Onconotus marginatus (Fabricius, 1798)
3. Onconotus servillei Fischer von Waldheim, 1846
