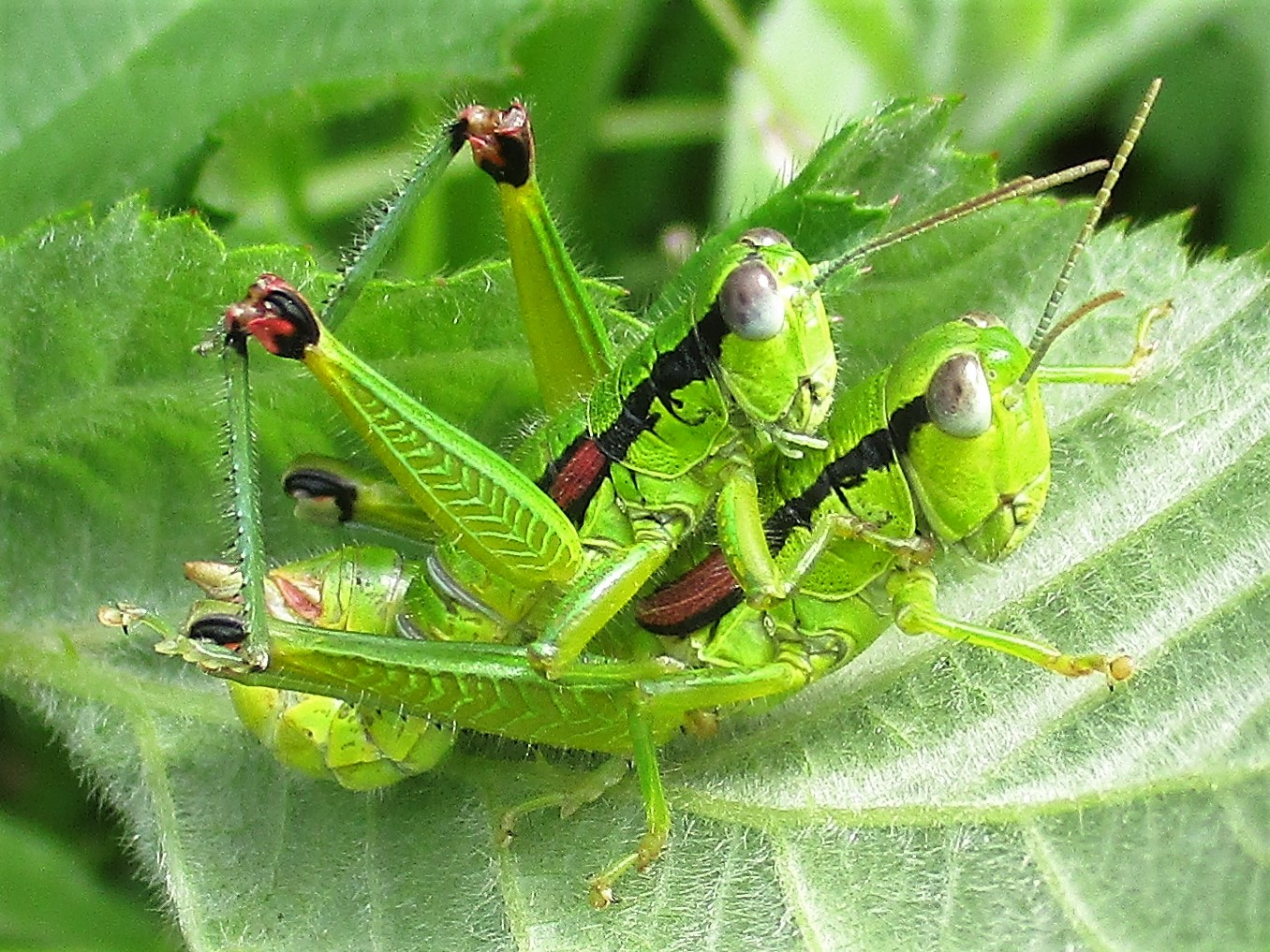
- Odontopodisma decipiens, Serbia

Conservation status
- Least Concern (IUCN 3.1)

Scientific classification
- Kingdom: Animalia
- Phylum: Arthropoda
- Clade: Pancrustacea
- Class: Insecta
- Order: Orthoptera
- Suborder: Caelifera
- Family: Acrididae
- Tribe: Podismini
- Genus: Odontopodisma
- Species: O. decipiens

Binomial name
- Odontopodisma decipiens Ramme, 1951

= Odontopodisma decipiens =

Species of grasshopper

Odontopodisma decipiens is a species of spur-throated grasshopper in the family Acrididae. It is found in Europe.

The IUCN conservation status of Odontopodisma decipiens is "LC", least concern, with no immediate threat to the species' survival. The IUCN status was assessed in 2015.

== Subspecies ==
These subspecies belong to the species Odontopodisma decipiens:

- Odontopodisma decipiens decipiens Ramme, 1951 (Cheating Mountain Grasshopper)
- Odontopodisma decipiens insubrica Nadig, 1980
- Odontopodisma decipiens rubritarsis Buresh & Peshev, 1955
