= Daihinibaenetes =

Scientific classification
- Domain: Eukaryota
- Kingdom: Animalia
- Phylum: Arthropoda
- Class: Insecta
- Order: Orthoptera
- Suborder: Ensifera
- Family: Rhaphidophoridae
- Subfamily: Ceuthophilinae
- Genus: Daihinibaenetes; Tinkham, 1962

Genus of cricket-like animals

Daihinibaenetes is a genus of sand-treader crickets in the family Rhaphidophoridae. There are at least three described species in Daihinibaenetes.

== Species ==
These three species belong to the genus Daihinibaenetes:

- Daihinibaenetes arizonensis (Tinkham, 1947)^{i c g b} (painted desert sand-treader cricket)
- Daihinibaenetes giganteus Tinkham, 1962^{i c g b} (giant sand-treader cricket)
- Daihinibaenetes tanneri Tinkham, 1962^{i c g b} (utah sand-treader cricket)

Data sources: i = ITIS, c = Catalogue of Life, g = GBIF, b = Bugguide.net
