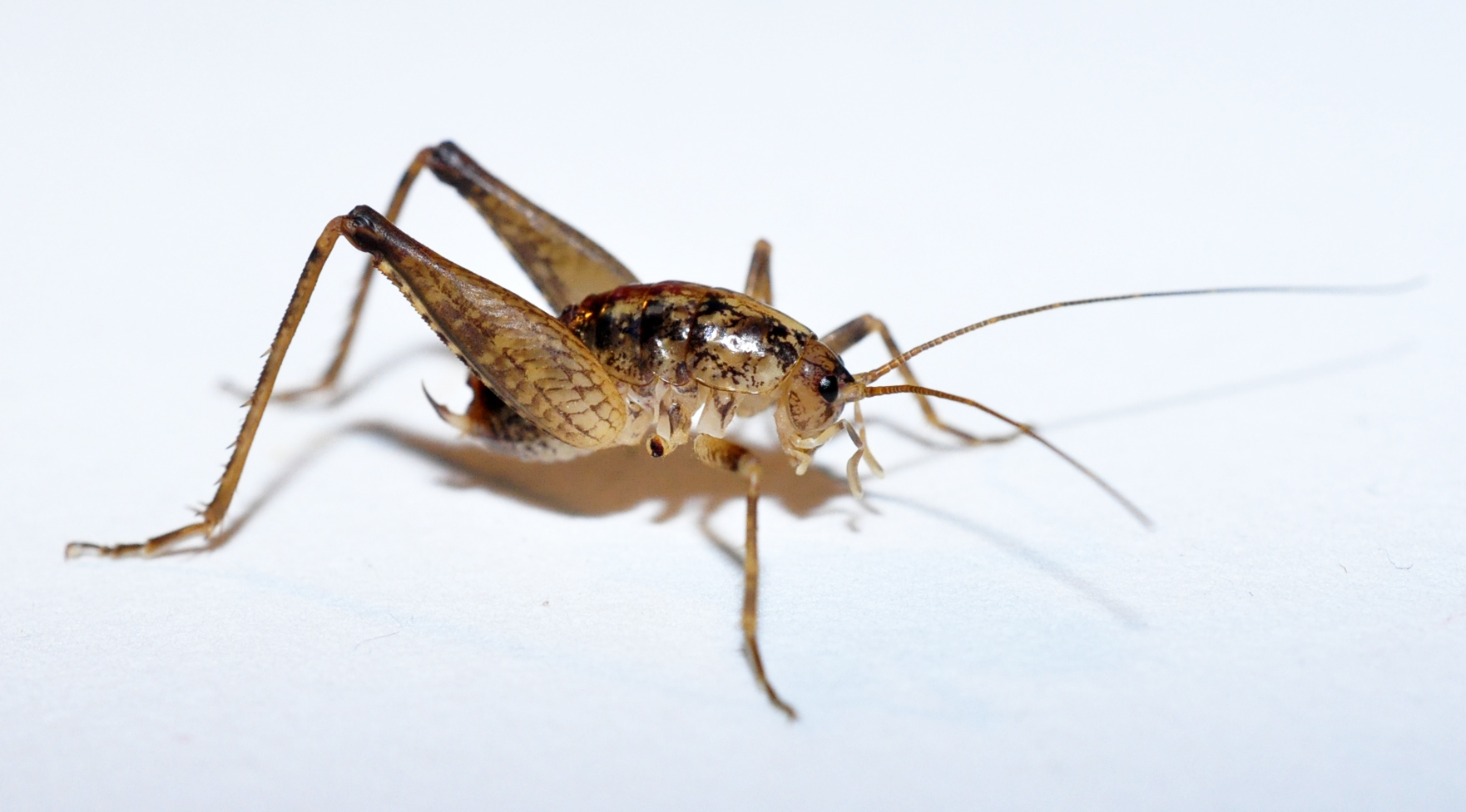

Scientific classification
- Domain: Eukaryota
- Kingdom: Animalia
- Phylum: Arthropoda
- Class: Insecta
- Order: Orthoptera
- Suborder: Ensifera
- Family: Rhaphidophoridae
- Subfamily: Ceuthophilinae
- Genus: Pristoceuthophilus
- Species: P. celatus

Binomial name
- Pristoceuthophilus celatus (Scudder, 1894)

= Pristoceuthophilus celatus =

Species of cricket-like animal

Pristoceuthophilus celatus is a species of camel cricket in the family Rhaphidophoridae. It is found in North America.
