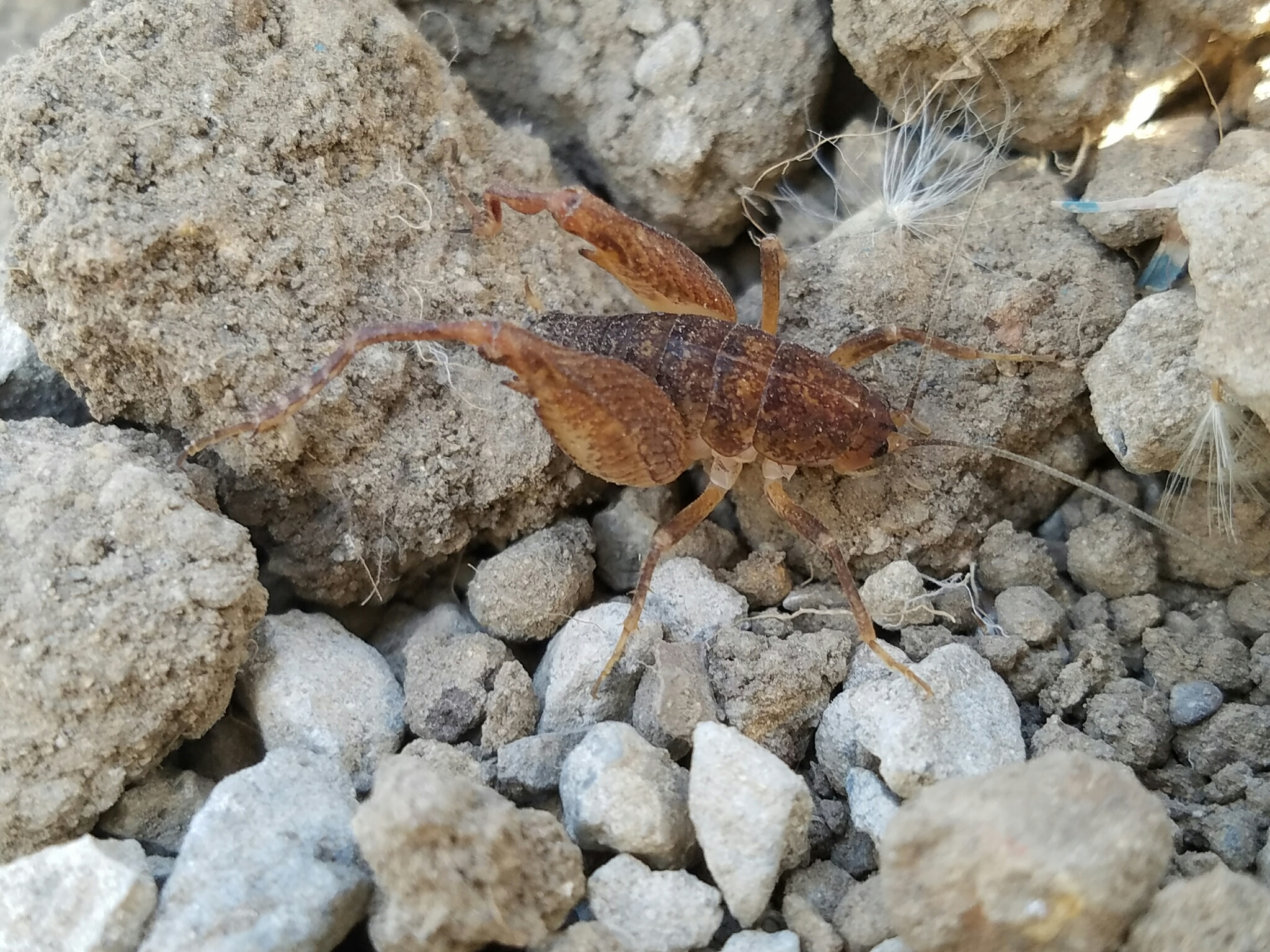
- Pristoceuthophilus pacificus

Scientific classification
- Kingdom: Animalia
- Phylum: Arthropoda
- Class: Insecta
- Order: Orthoptera
- Suborder: Ensifera
- Family: Rhaphidophoridae
- Subfamily: Ceuthophilinae
- Genus: Pristoceuthophilus; Rehn, 1903

= Pristoceuthophilus =

Genus of cricket-like animals

Pristoceuthophilus is a genus of North American cave cricket in family Rhaphidophoridae named by James A. G. Rehn in 1903.

== Species ==
Pristoceuthophilus contains the following:

1. Pristoceuthophilus arizonae Hebard, 1935
2. Pristoceuthophilus celatus (Scudder, 1894)
3. Pristoceuthophilus cercalis Caudell, 1916
4. Pristoceuthophilus gaigei Hubbell, 1925
5. Pristoceuthophilus marmoratus Rehn, 1904
6. Pristoceuthophilus pacificus (Thomas, 1872)
7. Pristoceuthophilus polluticornis (Scudder, 1899)
8. Pristoceuthophilus rhoadsi Rehn, 1903 - type species
9. Pristoceuthophilus salebrosus (Scudder, 1899)
10. Pristoceuthophilus sargentae Gurney, 1947
11. Pristoceuthophilus tuberculatus (Caudell, 1908)
12. Pristoceuthophilus unispinosus (Brunner, 1888)
- The Samwel Cave cricket has not been formally described, but has been also assigned to this genus.
