= Chloealtis abdominalis =

Scientific classification
- Kingdom: Animalia
- Phylum: Arthropoda
- Clade: Pancrustacea
- Class: Insecta
- Order: Orthoptera
- Suborder: Caelifera
- Family: Acrididae
- Subfamily: Gomphocerinae
- Genus: Chloealtis
- Species: C. abdominalis

Binomial name
- Chloealtis abdominalis (Thomas, 1873)

Species of grasshopper

Chloealtis abdominalis, the Rocky Mountain sprinkled locust, is a species of slant-faced grasshopper in the family Acrididae. It is found in North America.
