= Odontopodisma =

Scientific classification
- Kingdom: Animalia
- Phylum: Arthropoda
- Clade: Pancrustacea
- Class: Insecta
- Order: Orthoptera
- Suborder: Caelifera
- Family: Acrididae
- Subfamily: Melanoplinae
- Tribe: Podismini
- Genus: Odontopodisma; Dovnar-Zapolskyi 1932

Genus of grasshoppers

Odontopodisma is a genus of grasshoppers in the subfamily Melanoplinae, tribe Podismini, found in Europe and western Asia.

== Species ==
Species include:

- Odontopodisma acuminata
- Odontopodisma albanica
- Odontopodisma carpathica
- Odontopodisma decipiens
- Odontopodisma fallax (synonym Odontopodisma rammei)
- Odontopodisma montana
- Odontopodisma rubripes
- Odontopodisma schmidtii (type species)
