= Daihinibaenetes tanneri =

Scientific classification
- Domain: Eukaryota
- Kingdom: Animalia
- Phylum: Arthropoda
- Class: Insecta
- Order: Orthoptera
- Suborder: Ensifera
- Family: Rhaphidophoridae
- Subfamily: Ceuthophilinae
- Genus: Daihinibaenetes
- Species: D. tanneri

Binomial name
- Daihinibaenetes tanneri Tinkham, 1962

Species of cricket-like animal

Daihinibaenetes tanneri, the utah sand-treader cricket, is a species of camel cricket in the family Rhaphidophoridae. It is found in North America.
