= Chloealtis dianae =

Scientific classification
- Kingdom: Animalia
- Phylum: Arthropoda
- Clade: Pancrustacea
- Class: Insecta
- Order: Orthoptera
- Suborder: Caelifera
- Family: Acrididae
- Subfamily: Gomphocerinae
- Genus: Chloealtis
- Species: C. dianae

Binomial name
- Chloealtis dianae (Gurney, Strohecker & Helfer, 1964)

Species of grasshopper

Chloealtis dianae, the Diana black-side grasshopper, is a species of slant-faced grasshopper in the family Acrididae. It is found in North America.
