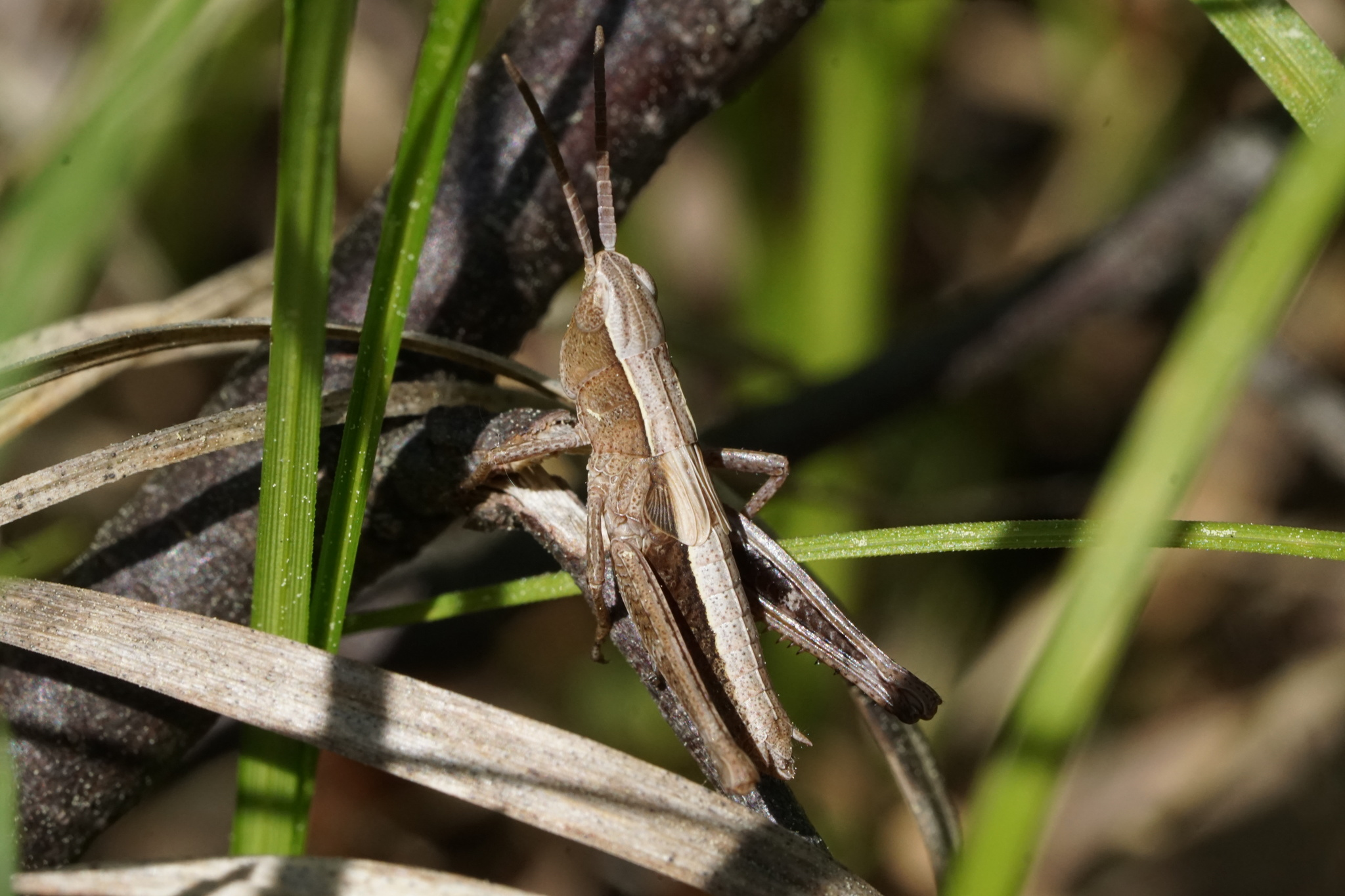
- Chloealtis conspersa, Massachusetts

Scientific classification
- Kingdom: Animalia
- Phylum: Arthropoda
- Clade: Pancrustacea
- Class: Insecta
- Order: Orthoptera
- Suborder: Caelifera
- Family: Acrididae
- Subfamily: Gomphocerinae
- Genus: Chloealtis
- Species: C. conspersa

Binomial name
- Chloealtis conspersa (Harris, 1841)

= Chloealtis conspersa =

Species of grasshopper

Chloealtis conspersa, known generally as sprinkled grasshopper, is a species of slant-faced grasshopper in the family Acrididae. Other common names include the sprinkled locust and sprinkled broad-winged grasshopper. It is found in North America.
