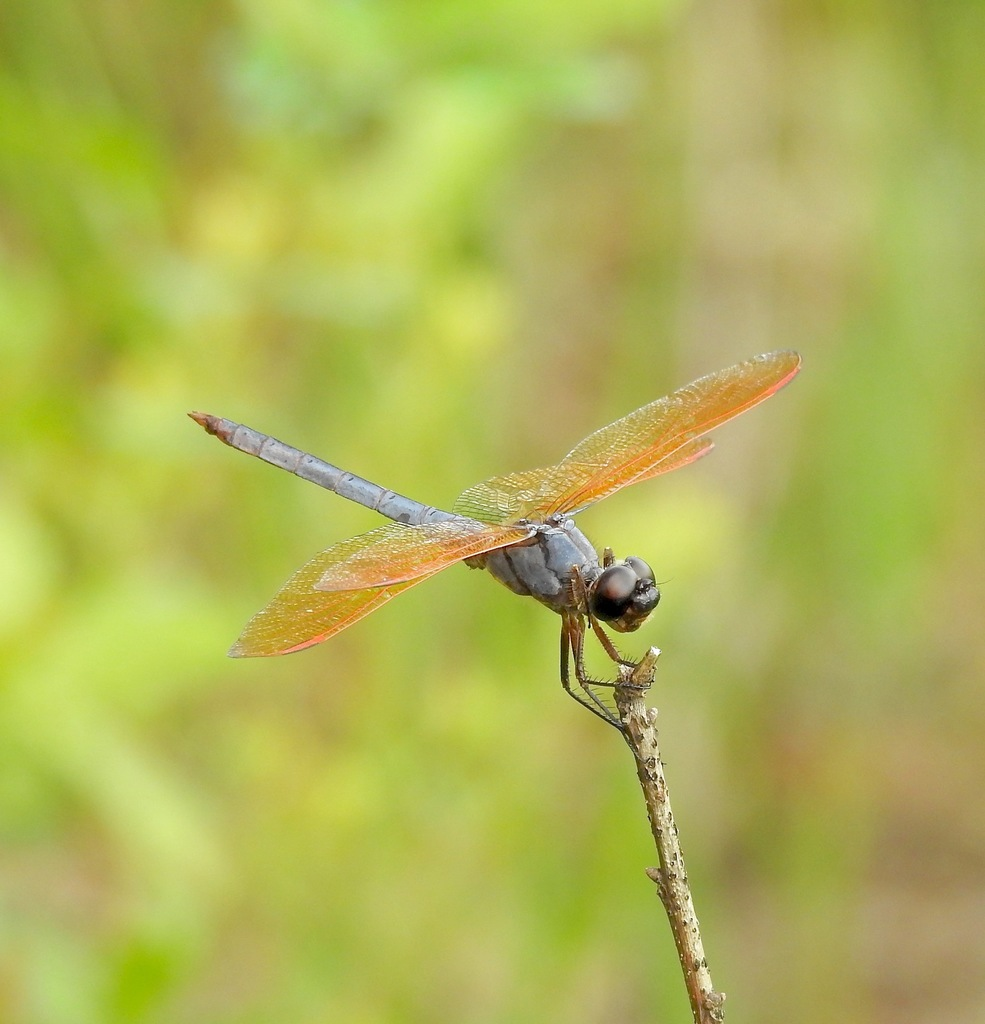

Conservation status
- Vulnerable (IUCN 3.1)

- Critically Imperiled (NatureServe)

Scientific classification
- Kingdom: Animalia
- Phylum: Arthropoda
- Clade: Pancrustacea
- Class: Insecta
- Order: Odonata
- Infraorder: Anisoptera
- Superfamily: Libelluloidea
- Family: Libellulidae
- Genus: Libellula
- Species: L. jesseana

Binomial name
- Libellula jesseana (Williamson, 1922)

= Libellula jesseana =

Purple skimmer

Species of dragonfly

Libellula jesseana, the purple skimmer, is a threatened dragonfly in the skimmer family. It is endemic to Florida in the United States.

== Description ==
Libellula jesseana adults are about 5 centimeters long. The male is pruinescent blue on the thorax and abdomen with orange wings. The female may have a similar coloration to the male, or have a golden hue overall identical to Libellula auripennis, the golden-winged skimmer.

== Distribution and habitat ==
Libellula jesseana is limited to ten counties in the panhandle and northern peninsula of Florida. There is a protected population at Gold Head Branch State Park in Clay County. Most other populations receive no protection. L. jesseana occurs at infertile, clear, sandy-bottomed lakes with shoreline stands of maidencane (Panicum hemitomon) and sometimes sedges and St. John's worts. The adults require open woodland or shrub-land nearby for foraging.

== Diet ==
Purple skimmer nymphs feed on nearly all small invertebrate organisms in their aquatic environment, and the adults catch insects that they locate visually.

== Life history ==
Adult purple skimmers are diurnal. The life cycle last approximately one year, with nymphs over-wintering and adults flying from mid-April through mid-September.

== Conservation ==
Libellula jesseana is threatened due to habitat degradation related to human population growth in Florida. Much of the habitat is threatened by processes such as eutrophication due to pollution from septic tanks and fertilizers, and groundwater depletion due to irrigation. In degraded wetlands, the common L. auripennis may outcompete the rare L. jesseana. The long term population trend expectation is a decline of 30-70% of the population. The NatureServe conservation status for this species is Critically Imperiled.
