= Lepidochrysops wykehami =

Conservation status
- Least Concern (IUCN 3.1)

Scientific classification
- Kingdom: Animalia
- Phylum: Arthropoda
- Class: Insecta
- Order: Lepidoptera
- Family: Lycaenidae
- Genus: Lepidochrysops
- Species: L. wykehami

Binomial name
- Lepidochrysops wykehami Tite, 1964

Species of butterfly

Lepidochrysops wykehami, the Wykeham's blue, is a species of butterfly in the family Lycaenidae. It is endemic to South Africa, where it is found in the hills of the Kamieskroon area in Northern Cape.

The wingspan is 36–44 mm for males and 42–46 mm for females. Adults are on wing from late August to October. There is one generation per year.

The larvae feed on Selago species.
