= Thestor rossouwi =

Conservation status
- Least Concern (IUCN 3.1)

Scientific classification
- Kingdom: Animalia
- Phylum: Arthropoda
- Class: Insecta
- Order: Lepidoptera
- Family: Lycaenidae
- Genus: Thestor
- Species: T. rossouwi

Binomial name
- Thestor rossouwi Dickson, 1971

Synonyms
- Thestor swanepoeli Pennington, 1971

Species of butterfly

Thestor rossouwi, the Rossouw's skolly, is a species of butterfly in the family Lycaenidae. It is endemic to South Africa., where it is known from coastal fynbos from between Riversdale and Stilbaai, west to Hermanus, Cape Agulhas and Bredasdorp in the Western Cape.

The wingspan is 27–32 mm for males and 30–36 mm for females. Adults are on wing from September to April. There might be more than one generation per year.
