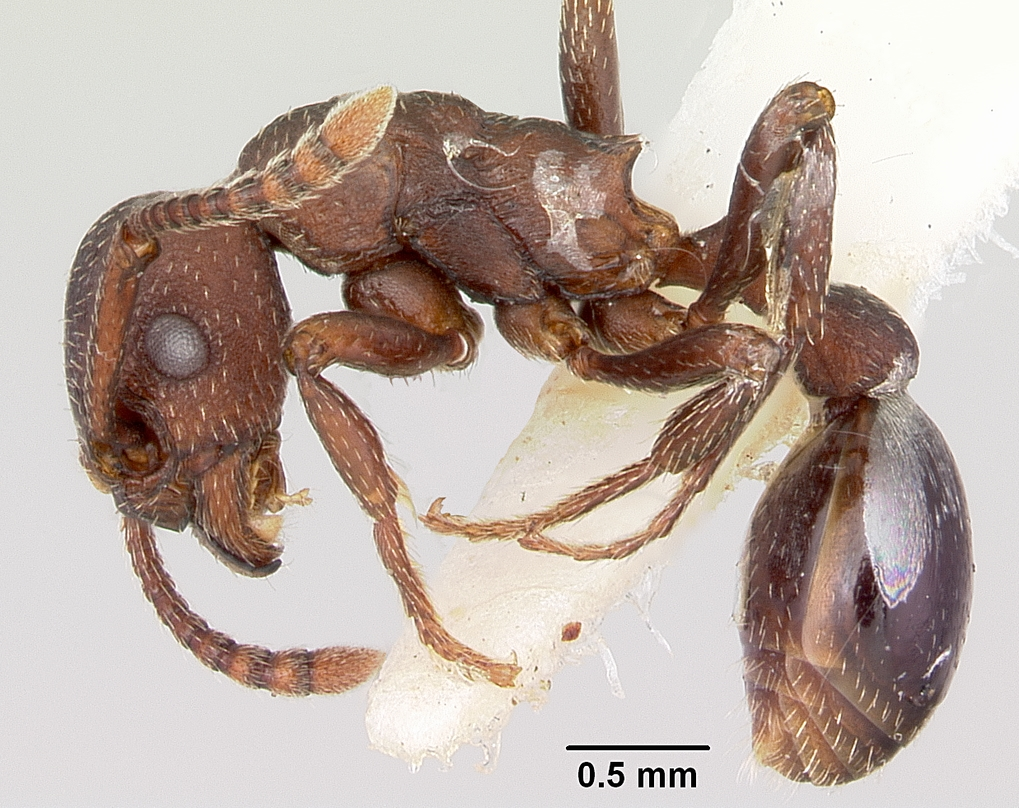

Conservation status
- Vulnerable (IUCN 2.3)

Scientific classification
- Domain: Eukaryota
- Kingdom: Animalia
- Phylum: Arthropoda
- Class: Insecta
- Order: Hymenoptera
- Family: Formicidae
- Subfamily: Myrmicinae
- Genus: Myrmica
- Species: M. colax

Binomial name
- Myrmica colax (Cole, 1957)

= Myrmica colax =

Species of ant

Myrmica colax is a species of ant, originally described by Cole as Paramyrmica colax. Until now, it is only known from its type locality in the Davis Mountains, Texas, USA. He found M. colax in a M. striolagaster colony and considers the two species quite similar in morphology. This suggests M. colax might be an inquiline.
