= Lepidochrysops pephredo =

- in Seitz k

Conservation status
- Vulnerable (IUCN 3.1)

Scientific classification
- Kingdom: Animalia
- Phylum: Arthropoda
- Clade: Pancrustacea
- Class: Insecta
- Order: Lepidoptera
- Family: Lycaenidae
- Genus: Lepidochrysops
- Species: L. pephredo

Binomial name
- Lepidochrysops pephredo (Trimen, 1889)

Synonyms
- Lycaena pephredo Trimen, 1889; Cupido pephredo; Neochrysops pephredo

Species of butterfly

Lepidochrysops pephredo, the Estcourt blue, is a species of butterfly in the family Lycaenidae. It is endemic to South Africa, and is found in the grassy hills of the KwaZulu-Natal midlands.

The wingspan is 32–38 mm (1.3–1.5 in) for males and 36–40 mm (1.4–1.6 in) for females. Adults are on wing from October to November. There is one generation per year.

The larvae feed on Becium grandiflorum. Third and later instar larvae feed on the brood of Camponotus niveosetus ants.
