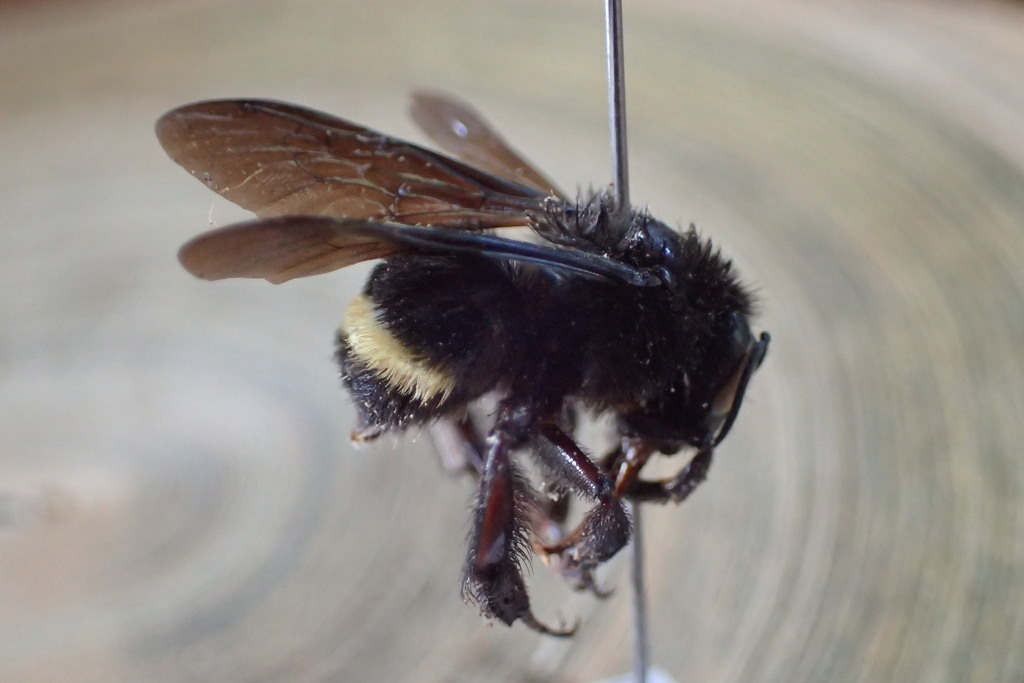

Conservation status
- Vulnerable (IUCN 3.1)

Scientific classification
- Domain: Eukaryota
- Kingdom: Animalia
- Phylum: Arthropoda
- Class: Insecta
- Order: Hymenoptera
- Family: Apidae
- Genus: Bombus
- Subgenus: Thoracobombus
- Species: B. mexicanus

Binomial name
- Bombus mexicanus Cresson, 1878

= Bombus mexicanus =

Species of bee

Bombus mexicanus is a species of bumblebee. It is native to Mexico and Central America.

This bee lives in moist mountain forests, lowland tropical forests, and plantations. It is most common between 400 and 1000 meters in elevation. It is a pollinator of guava and coffee plants.

This species has faced significant declines. Its current range is less than 17% of its historical range. Threats to its survival include loss of habitat to agricultural practices, including cattle ranching and chemical use. It is associated with local native plants, which also face major declines in population.

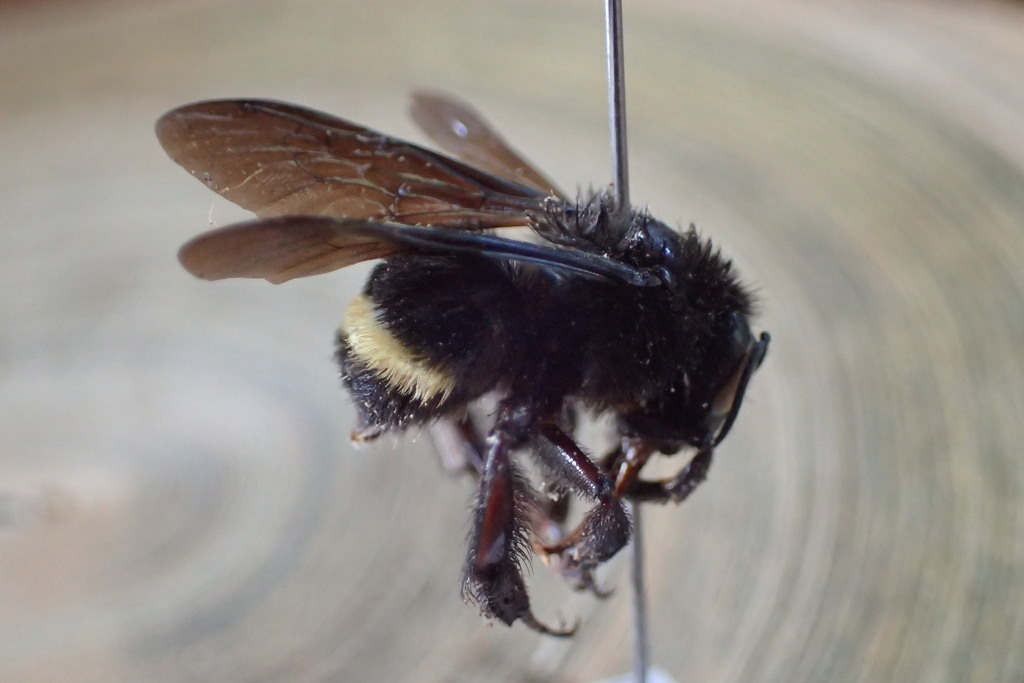
Bombus mexicanus specimen
