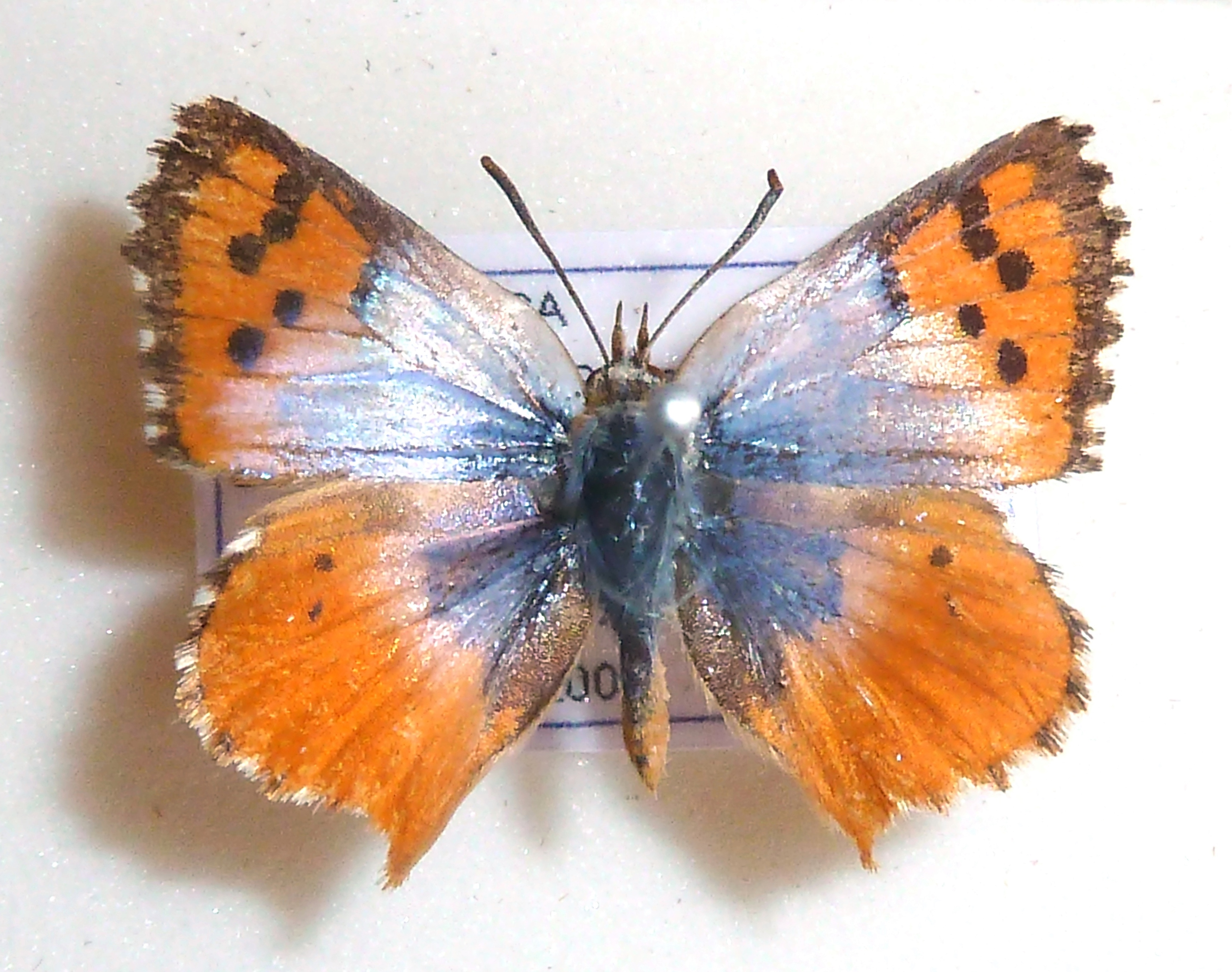
- Male

Scientific classification
- Kingdom: Animalia
- Phylum: Arthropoda
- Clade: Pancrustacea
- Class: Insecta
- Order: Lepidoptera
- Family: Lycaenidae
- Genus: Chrysoritis
- Species: C. beaufortius

Binomial name
- Chrysoritis beaufortius (Dickson, 1966)

Synonyms
- Poecilmitis beaufortius Dickson, 1966; Poecilmitis stepheni Dickson, 1966; Poecilmitis kaplani Henning, 1979

= Chrysoritis beaufortius =

Beaufort opal

Species of butterfly

Chrysoritis beaufortius, the Beaufort opal, is a butterfly of the family Lycaenidae found only in South Africa.

The wingspan is 32–36 mm for males and 32–38 mm for females. The flight period is from August to February in one brood.

Larvae feed on Dimorphotheca cuneata. They are associated with Crematogaster peringueyi ants.

== Subspecies ==
- Chrysoritis beaufortius beaufortius – South Africa: Western Cape
- Chrysoritis beaufortius charlesi (Dickson, 1970) – South Africa: Northern Cape
- Chrysoritis beaufortius stepheni (Dickson, 1978) – South Africa: Northern Cape
- Chrysoritis beaufortius sutherlandensis Heath & Pringle, 2007 – South Africa: Northern Cape
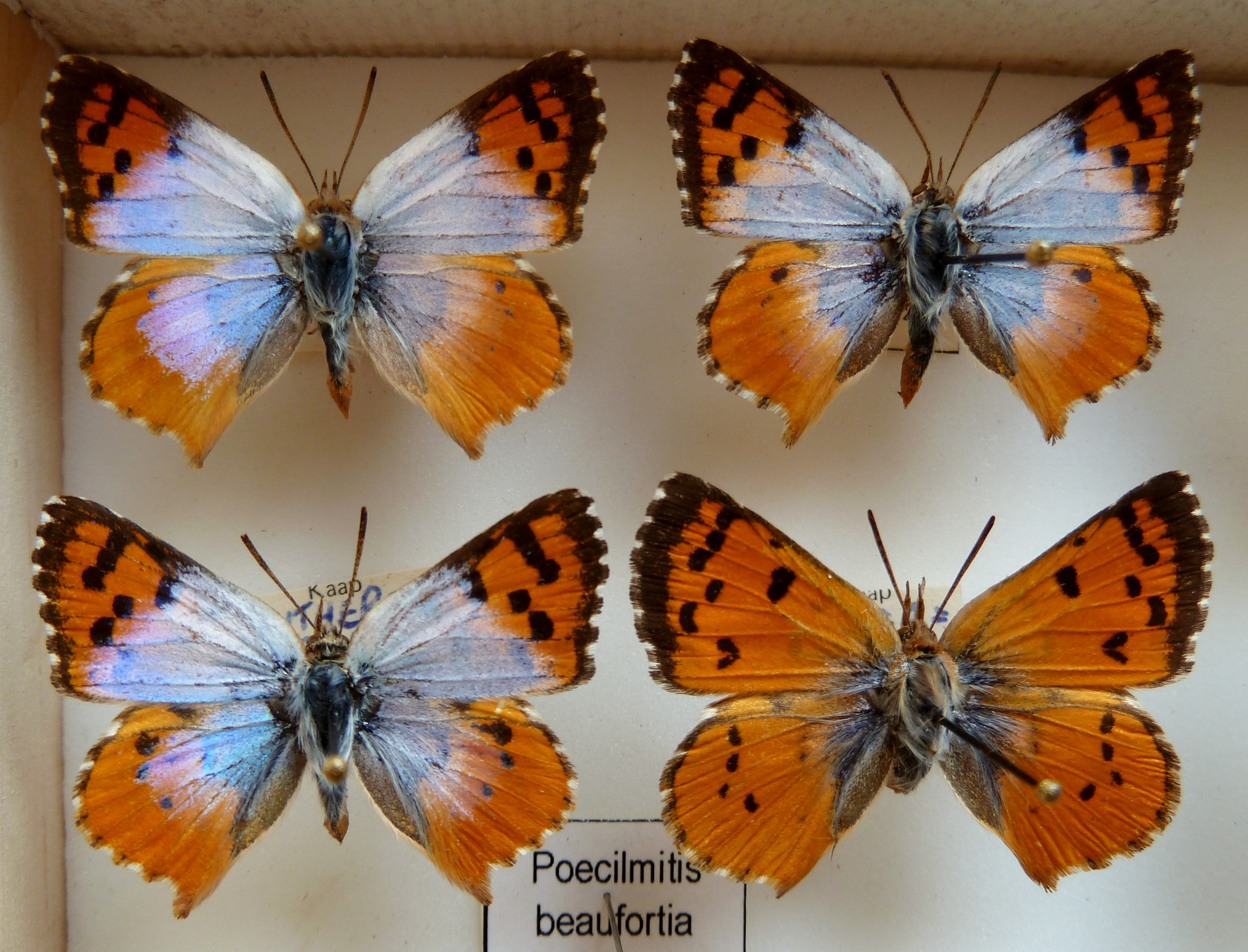
Male and female
C. b. beaufortius

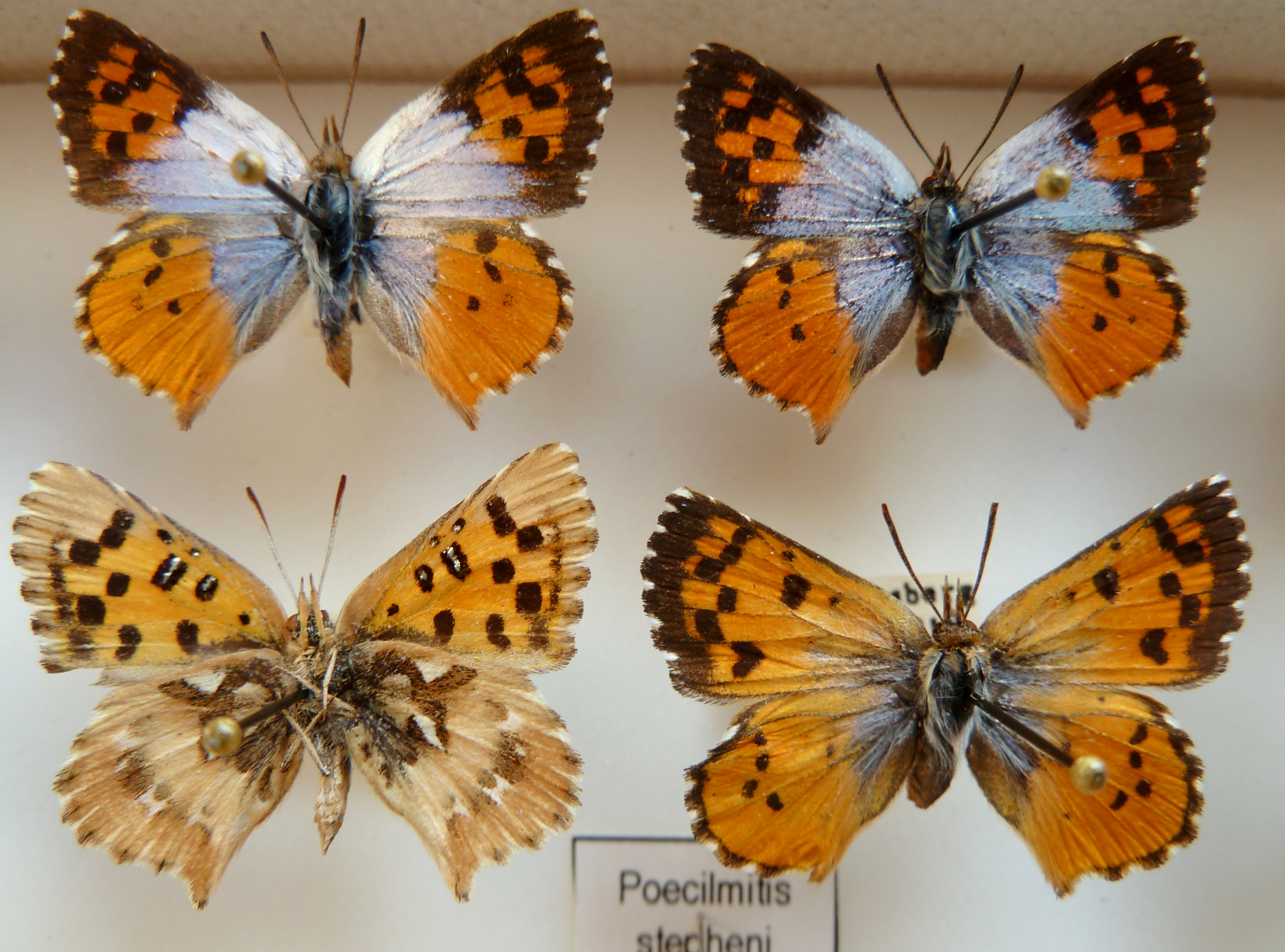
Male and female
C. (b.) stepheni
