= Crematogaster atitlanica =

Conservation status
- Vulnerable (IUCN 2.3)

Scientific classification
- Kingdom: Animalia
- Phylum: Arthropoda
- Class: Insecta
- Order: Hymenoptera
- Family: Formicidae
- Subfamily: Myrmicinae
- Genus: Crematogaster
- Species: C. atitlanica

Binomial name
- Crematogaster atitlanica Wheeler, 1936

Species of ant

Crematogaster atitlanica is a species of ant endemic to Guatemala.
