= Myrmoxenus gordiagini =

Conservation status
- Vulnerable (IUCN 2.3)

Scientific classification
- Kingdom: Animalia
- Phylum: Arthropoda
- Class: Insecta
- Order: Hymenoptera
- Family: Formicidae
- Subfamily: Myrmicinae
- Genus: Temnothorax
- Species: T. gordiagini

Binomial name
- Temnothorax gordiagini Ruzsky, 1902

Synonyms
- Myrmecoxenus gordiagini Ruzsky, 1902 [orthographic error]

Species of ant

Myrmoxenus gordiagini is a species of slave-making ant in the genus Myrmoxenus. It is found in Croatia and Russia. Its natural habitat is temperate forests.
