= Papilio osmana =

Conservation status
- Vulnerable (IUCN 2.3)

Scientific classification
- Kingdom: Animalia
- Phylum: Arthropoda
- Clade: Pancrustacea
- Class: Insecta
- Order: Lepidoptera
- Family: Papilionidae
- Genus: Papilio
- Species: P. osmana

Binomial name
- Papilio osmana Jumalon, 1967

Species of butterfly

Papilio osmana is a species of butterfly in the family Papilionidae. It is endemic to the Philippines.
