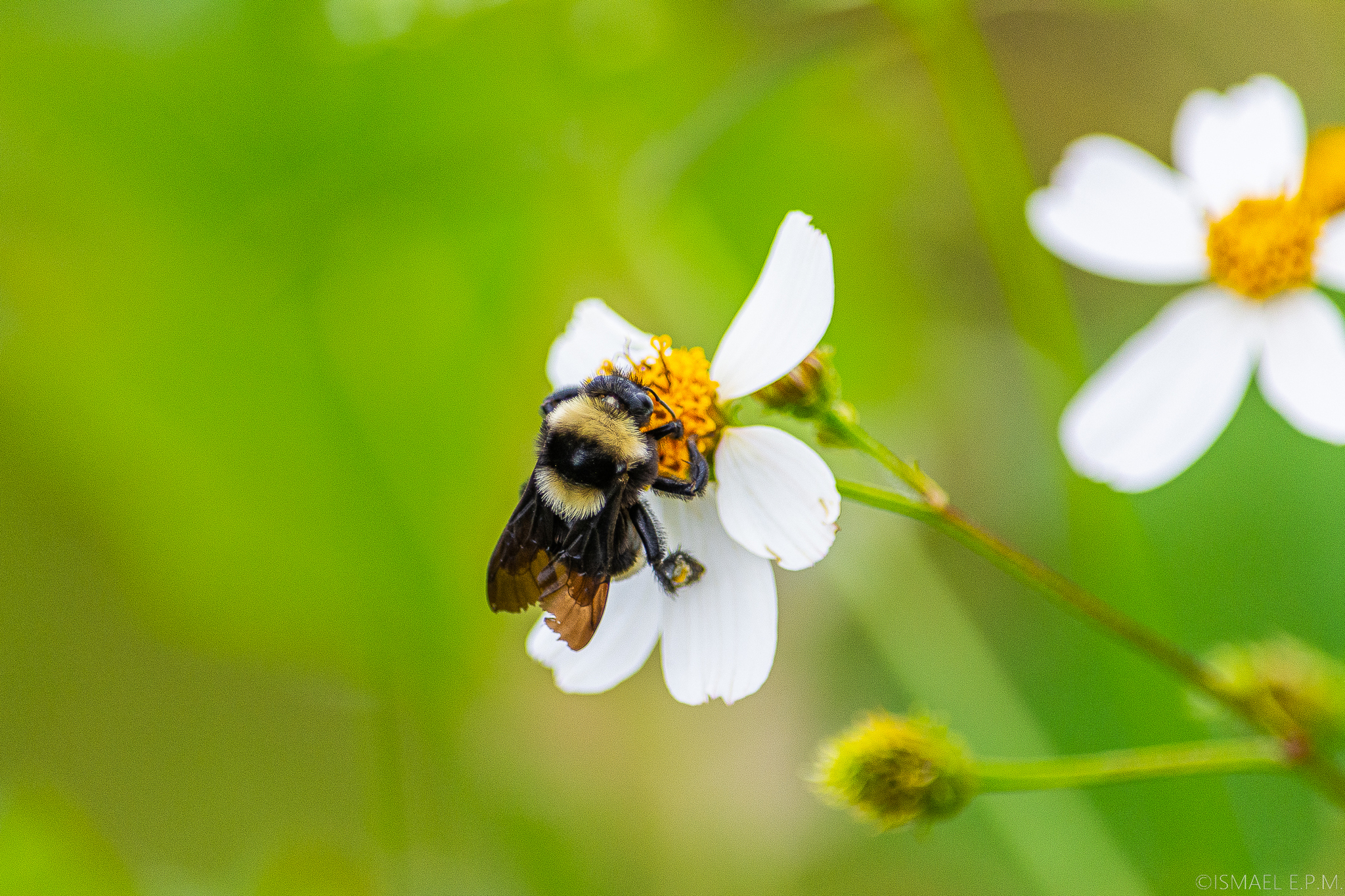

Conservation status
- Vulnerable (IUCN 3.1)

Scientific classification
- Domain: Eukaryota
- Kingdom: Animalia
- Phylum: Arthropoda
- Class: Insecta
- Order: Hymenoptera
- Family: Apidae
- Genus: Bombus
- Subgenus: Fervidobombus
- Species: B. medius

Binomial name
- Bombus medius Cresson, 1863

= Bombus medius =

Species of bee

Bombus medius is a species of bumblebee. It is native to Mexico and Central America.

This species lives in lower montane rainforest and cloud forest. It lives in protected areas containing natural forest remnants in areas where habitat has been lost. It does not occur in surrounding regions where intensive agriculture has spread. Habitat has also been lost to logging, mining, pollution, and human settlement. Some nests have been found in overgrown areas once cleared for agricultural purposes.

This bee creates its nest underground, in very shallow holes. It may use abandoned rodent burrows, sometimes with debris inside. The colonies are small; a nest noted in the literature had 27 workers. The eggs and larvae rest in a bed of moist pollen. Once the young emerge from their cocoons, the old cocoon shells are enlarged with wax and used to store honey.
