= Daihinibaenetes arizonensis =

Conservation status
- Vulnerable (IUCN 2.3)

Scientific classification
- Kingdom: Animalia
- Phylum: Arthropoda
- Class: Insecta
- Order: Orthoptera
- Suborder: Ensifera
- Family: Rhaphidophoridae
- Genus: Daihinibaenetes
- Species: D. arizonensis

Binomial name
- Daihinibaenetes arizonensis (Tinkham, 1947)

Species of cricket-like animal

Daihinibaenetes arizonensis is a species of insect in the family Rhaphidophoridae known commonly as the Arizona giant sand treader cricket. It is endemic to Arizona in the United States, where it is known only from sand dune habitat near Petrified Forest National Park.

This species is a wingless, cricketlike insect with a large pale brown body with a tan wash on the upper side. One of the few collected specimens measured over 2 centimeters in length. It is a nocturnal species most often seen in spring before most likely die in the summer heat. It jumps well and digs up to 18 inches deep, probably to reach moisture in the sand. It feeds on detritus.
