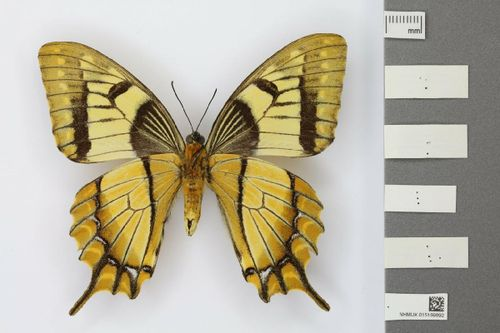

Conservation status
- Endangered (IUCN 3.1)

Scientific classification
- Kingdom: Animalia
- Phylum: Arthropoda
- Clade: Pancrustacea
- Class: Insecta
- Order: Lepidoptera
- Family: Papilionidae
- Genus: Papilio
- Species: P. esperanza

Binomial name
- Papilio esperanza Beutelspacher, 1975

= Papilio esperanza =

Esperanza swallowtail

Species of butterfly

Papilio esperanza, known as the Oaxacan esperanza or Oaxacan swallowtail, is a species of butterfly in the family Papilionidae. It is endemic to Mexico. The Papilio esperanza is one of Mexico's rarest butterflies and is considered Endangered by The IUCN red list of threatened species. The species is threatened by destruction of habitat but its main concern is poaching for specimens.
