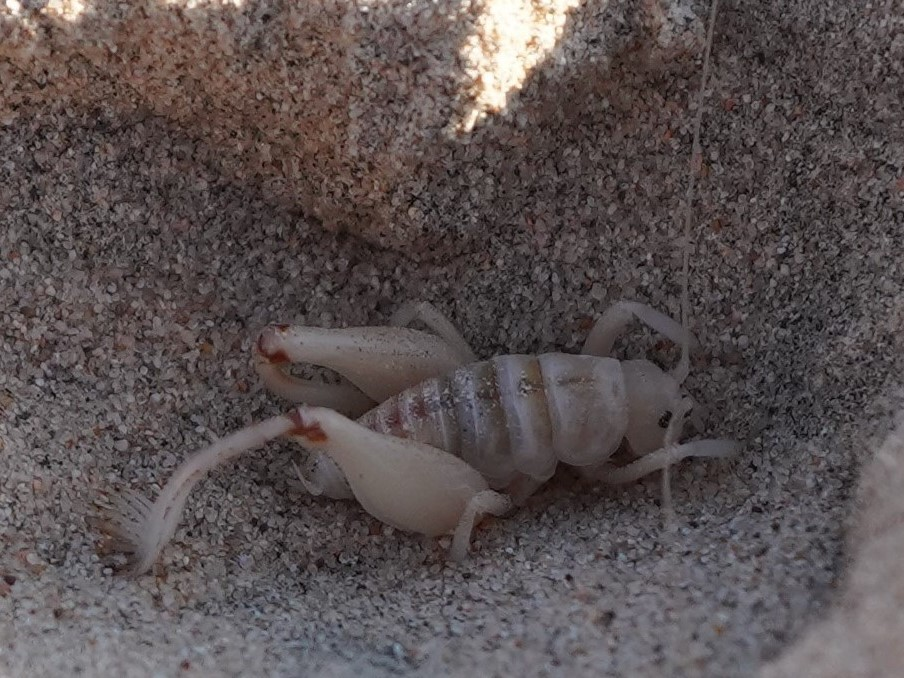

Conservation status
- Vulnerable (IUCN 2.3)

Scientific classification
- Kingdom: Animalia
- Phylum: Arthropoda
- Class: Insecta
- Order: Orthoptera
- Suborder: Ensifera
- Family: Rhaphidophoridae
- Genus: Macrobaenetes
- Species: M. kelsoensis

Binomial name
- Macrobaenetes kelsoensis Tinkham, 1962

= Macrobaenetes kelsoensis =

Species of cricket-like animal

Macrobaenetes kelsoensis is a species of insect in family Rhaphidophoridae known commonly as the Kelso giant sand treader cricket. It is endemic to California, where it is known only from San Bernardino County.
