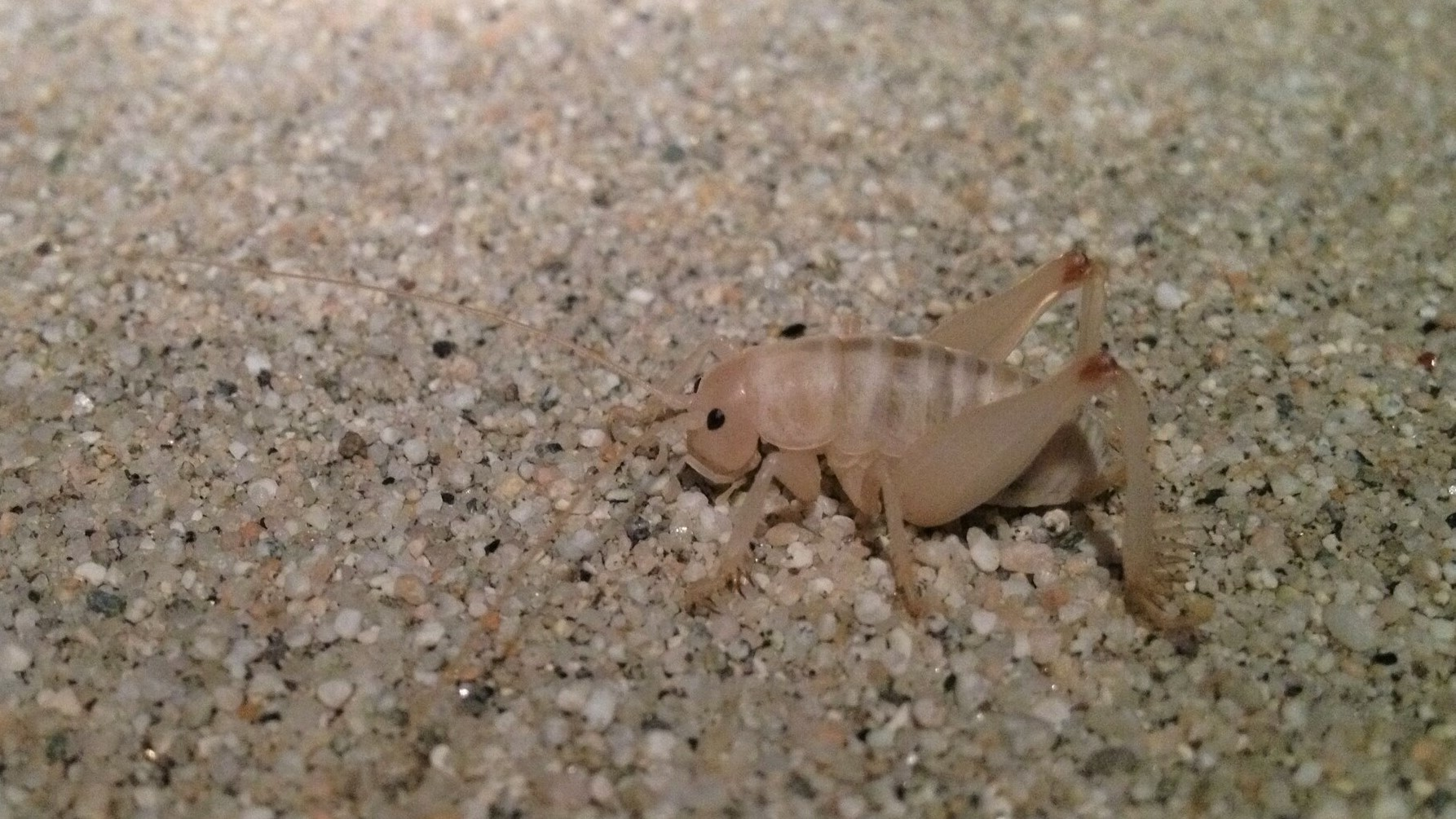

Conservation status
- Vulnerable (IUCN 2.3)

Scientific classification
- Kingdom: Animalia
- Phylum: Arthropoda
- Class: Insecta
- Order: Orthoptera
- Suborder: Ensifera
- Family: Rhaphidophoridae
- Genus: Macrobaenetes
- Species: M. valgum

Binomial name
- Macrobaenetes valgum (Stronkecker, 1960)

= Macrobaenetes valgum =

Species of insect

Macrobaenetes valgum, the Coachella giant sand treader cricket, is a species of insect in the family Rhaphidophoridae. It is endemic to the United States.
