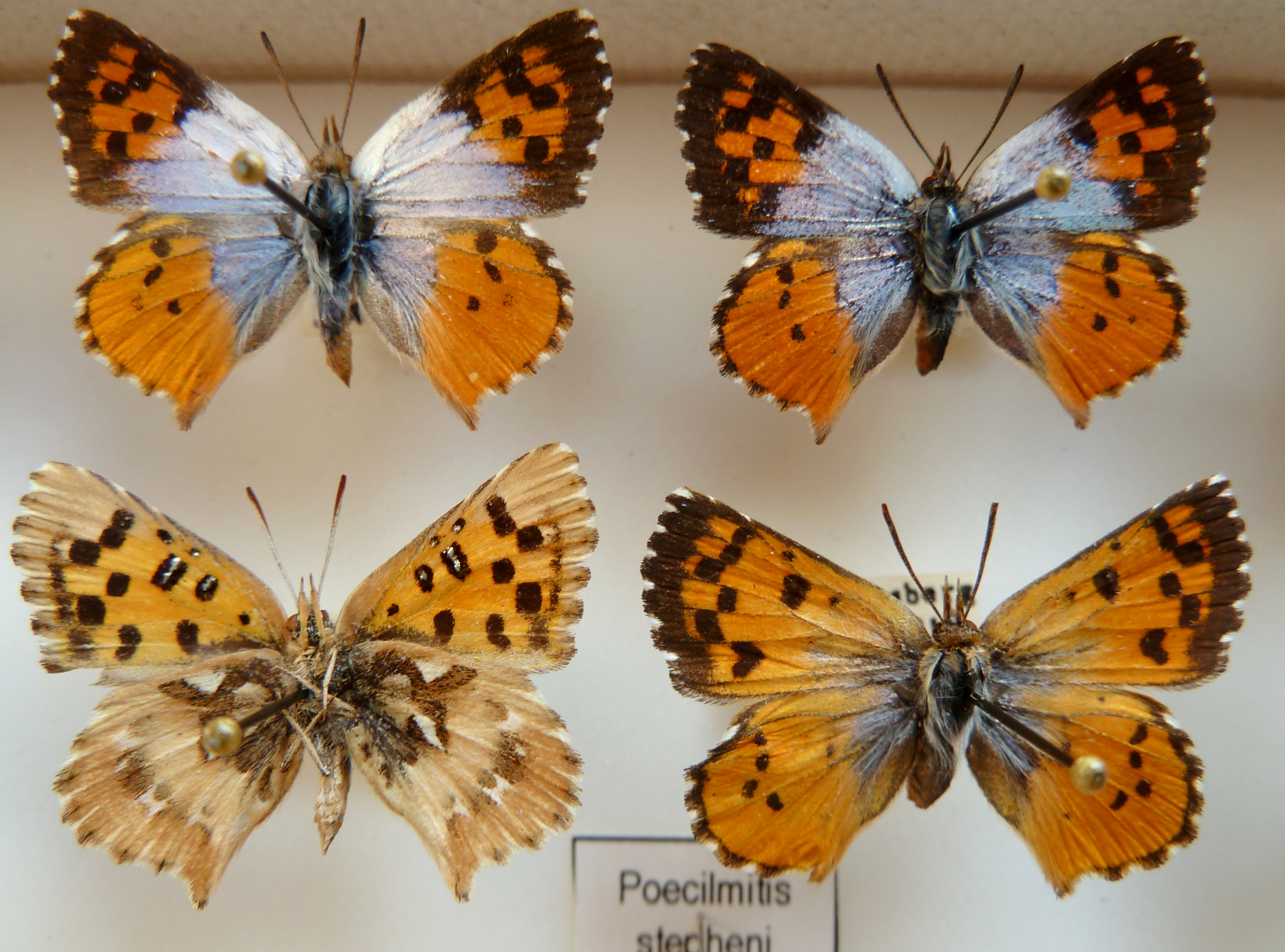
- Set of C. (b.) stepheni

Conservation status
- Vulnerable (IUCN 2.3)

Scientific classification
- Kingdom: Animalia
- Phylum: Arthropoda
- Clade: Pancrustacea
- Class: Insecta
- Order: Lepidoptera
- Family: Lycaenidae
- Genus: Chrysoritis
- Species: C. stepheni

Binomial name
- Chrysoritis stepheni (Dickson, 1978)

Synonyms
- Poecilmitis stepheni Dickson, 1978

= Chrysoritis stepheni =

Species of butterfly

Chrysoritis stepheni is a species of butterfly in the family Lycaenidae. It is endemic to South Africa. It is mostly treated as a subspecies of Chrysoritis beaufortius.

== Sources ==
- Gimenez Dixon, M. (1996). "Poecilmitis stepheni". IUCN Red List of Threatened Species. 1996 e.T17857A7572861. doi:10.2305/IUCN.UK.1996.RLTS.T17857A7572861.en.
- "Poecilmitis stepheni Dickson 1978". Encyclopedia of Life, available from "http://www.eol.org/pages/257895".
