= Lepidochrysops poseidon =

Paul alfred red

Conservation status
- Least Concern (IUCN 3.1)

Scientific classification
- Kingdom: Animalia
- Phylum: Arthropoda
- Class: Insecta
- Order: Lepidoptera
- Family: Lycaenidae
- Genus: Lepidochrysops
- Species: L. poseidon

Binomial name
- Lepidochrysops poseidon Pringle, 1987

Species of butterfly

Lepidochrysops poseidon, the Baviaanskloof blue, is a species of butterfly in the family Lycaenidae. It is endemic to South Africa.

The wingspan is 34–40 mm for males and 34–36 mm for females. Adults are on wing from late November to February.
