= Chloealtis aspasma =

Conservation status
- Vulnerable (IUCN 2.3)

Scientific classification
- Kingdom: Animalia
- Phylum: Arthropoda
- Clade: Pancrustacea
- Class: Insecta
- Order: Orthoptera
- Suborder: Caelifera
- Family: Acrididae
- Genus: Chloealtis
- Species: C. aspasma

Binomial name
- Chloealtis aspasma Rehn & Hebard, 1919

Species of grasshopper

Chloealtis aspasma is a species of grasshopper in the family Acrididae. It is native to northern California and southern Oregon in the United States. It is known by the common names Siskiyou short-horned grasshopper and Siskiyou Chloealtis grasshopper.
