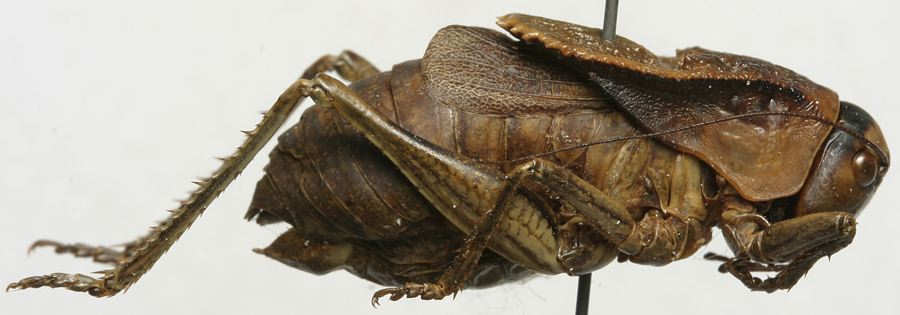

Conservation status
- Least Concern (IUCN 3.1)

Scientific classification
- Kingdom: Animalia
- Phylum: Arthropoda
- Class: Insecta
- Order: Orthoptera
- Suborder: Ensifera
- Family: Tettigoniidae
- Genus: Onconotus
- Species: O. servillei

Binomial name
- Onconotus servillei Fischer-Waldheim, 1846

= Onconotus servillei =

Species of cricket-like animal

Onconotus servillei is a species of insect in family Tettigoniidae. It is found in Hungary and Romania.
