= Odontopodisma rubripes =

Conservation status
- Near Threatened (IUCN 3.1)

Scientific classification
- Kingdom: Animalia
- Phylum: Arthropoda
- Clade: Pancrustacea
- Class: Insecta
- Order: Orthoptera
- Suborder: Caelifera
- Family: Acrididae
- Tribe: Podismini
- Genus: Odontopodisma
- Species: O. rubripes

Binomial name
- Odontopodisma rubripes (Ramme, 1931)

Species of grasshopper

Odontopodisma rubripes is a species of insect in family Acrididae. It is endemic to Romania and small parts of Hungary, Slovakia and Ukraine.
