= Hemisaga lucifer =

Conservation status
- Vulnerable (IUCN 2.3)

Scientific classification
- Kingdom: Animalia
- Phylum: Arthropoda
- Clade: Pancrustacea
- Class: Insecta
- Order: Orthoptera
- Suborder: Ensifera
- Family: Tettigoniidae
- Genus: Hemisaga
- Species: H. lucifer

Binomial name
- Hemisaga lucifer Rentz, 1993

Species of cricket-like animal

Hemisaga lucifer is a species of insect in family Tettigoniidae. It is endemic to Australia.

== Conservation ==
According to GBIF, the Hermisaga Lucifer is at a vulnerable IUCN status.
