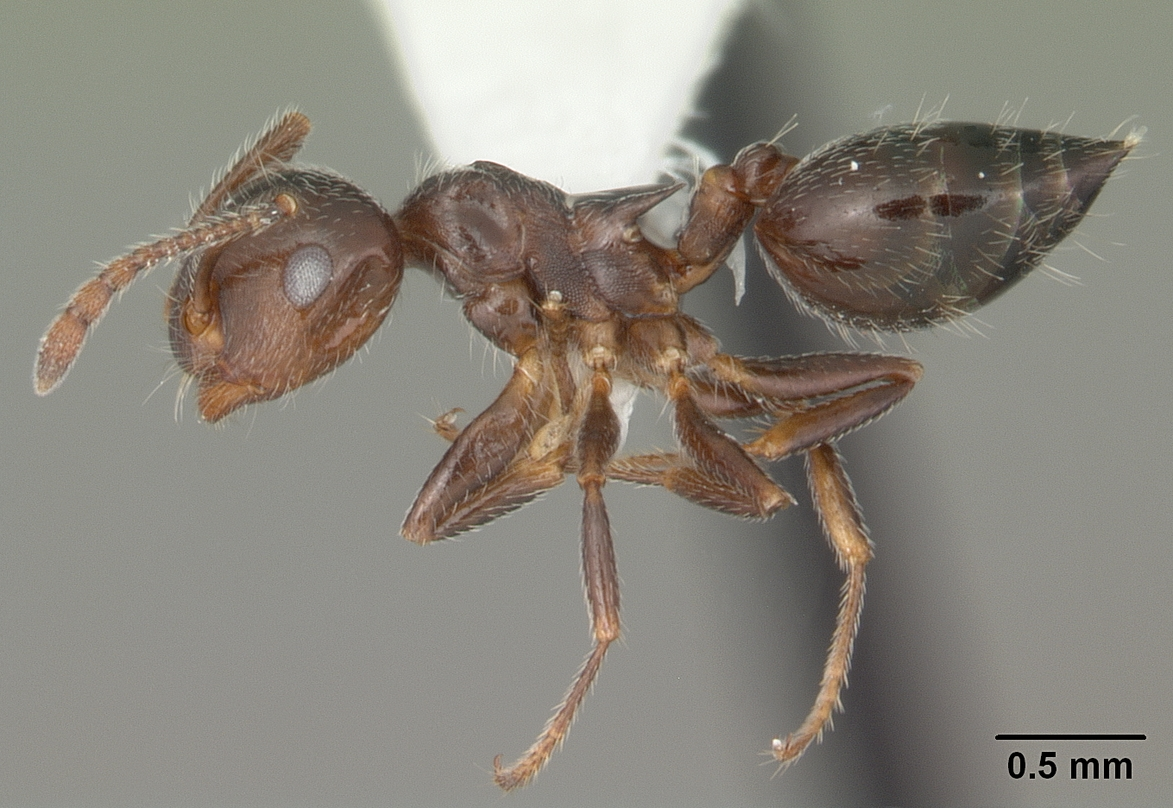
- Crematogaster pilosa worker

Conservation status
- Vulnerable (IUCN 2.3)

Scientific classification
- Kingdom: Animalia
- Phylum: Arthropoda
- Class: Insecta
- Order: Hymenoptera
- Family: Formicidae
- Subfamily: Myrmicinae
- Genus: Crematogaster
- Species: C. pilosa

Binomial name
- Crematogaster pilosa Emery, 1895

Synonyms
- Crematogaster creightoni Wheeler, 1933

= Crematogaster pilosa =

Species of ant

Crematogaster pilosa species of ant in the subfamily Myrmicinae. It is native along the southern Atlantic coast of the United States and some interior areas. These polydomous ants have been found living in tidal marshes, wet meadows and other environments in plant stems, logs, and fallen branches.
