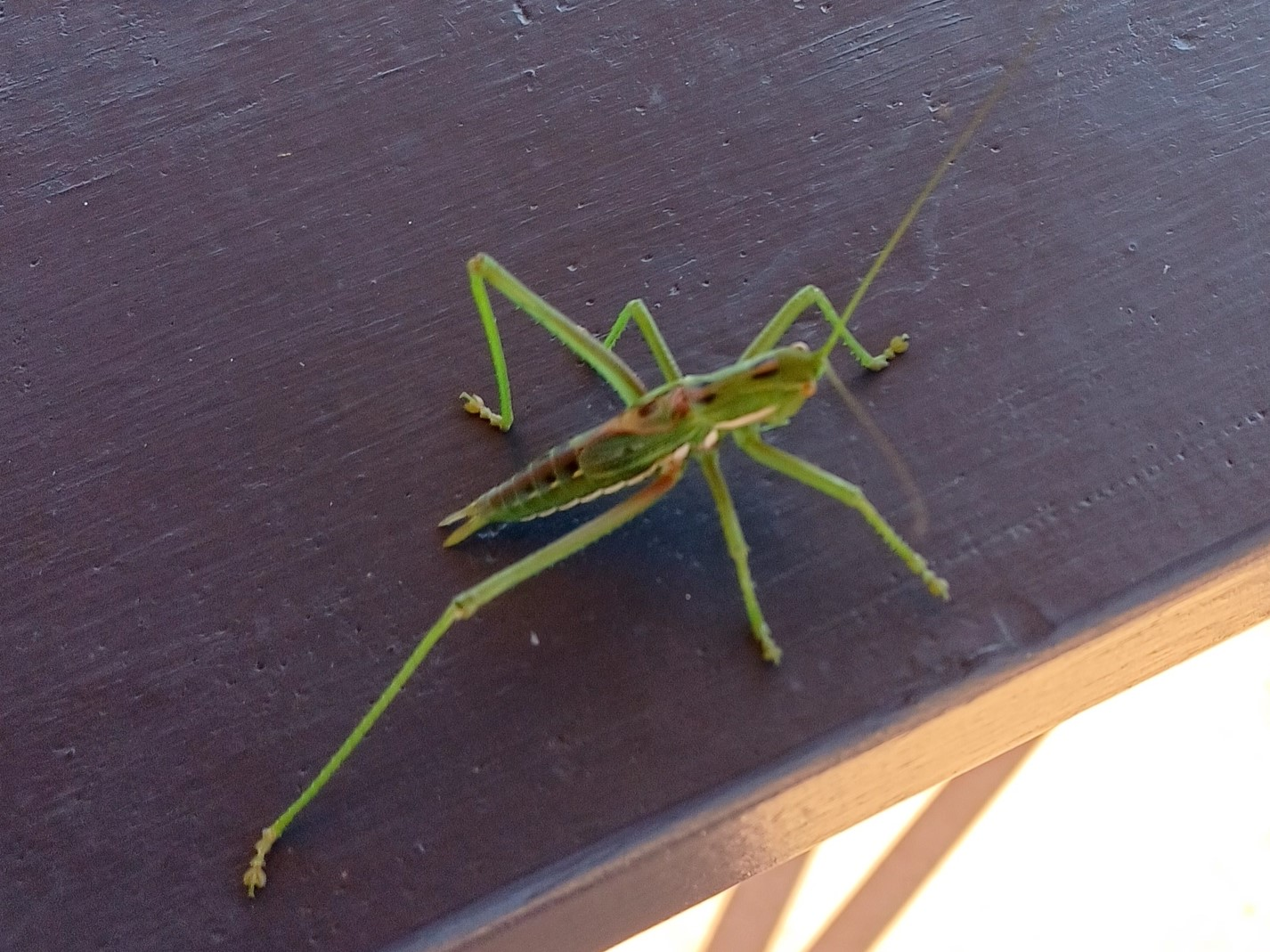

Conservation status
- Vulnerable (IUCN 2.3)

Scientific classification
- Kingdom: Animalia
- Phylum: Arthropoda
- Class: Insecta
- Order: Orthoptera
- Suborder: Ensifera
- Family: Tettigoniidae
- Genus: Hemisaga
- Species: H. vepreculae

Binomial name
- Hemisaga vepreculae Rentz, 1993

= Hemisaga vepreculae =

Species of cricket-like animal

Hemisaga vepreculae is a species of katydid in the family Tettigoniidae. It is endemic to Australia.
