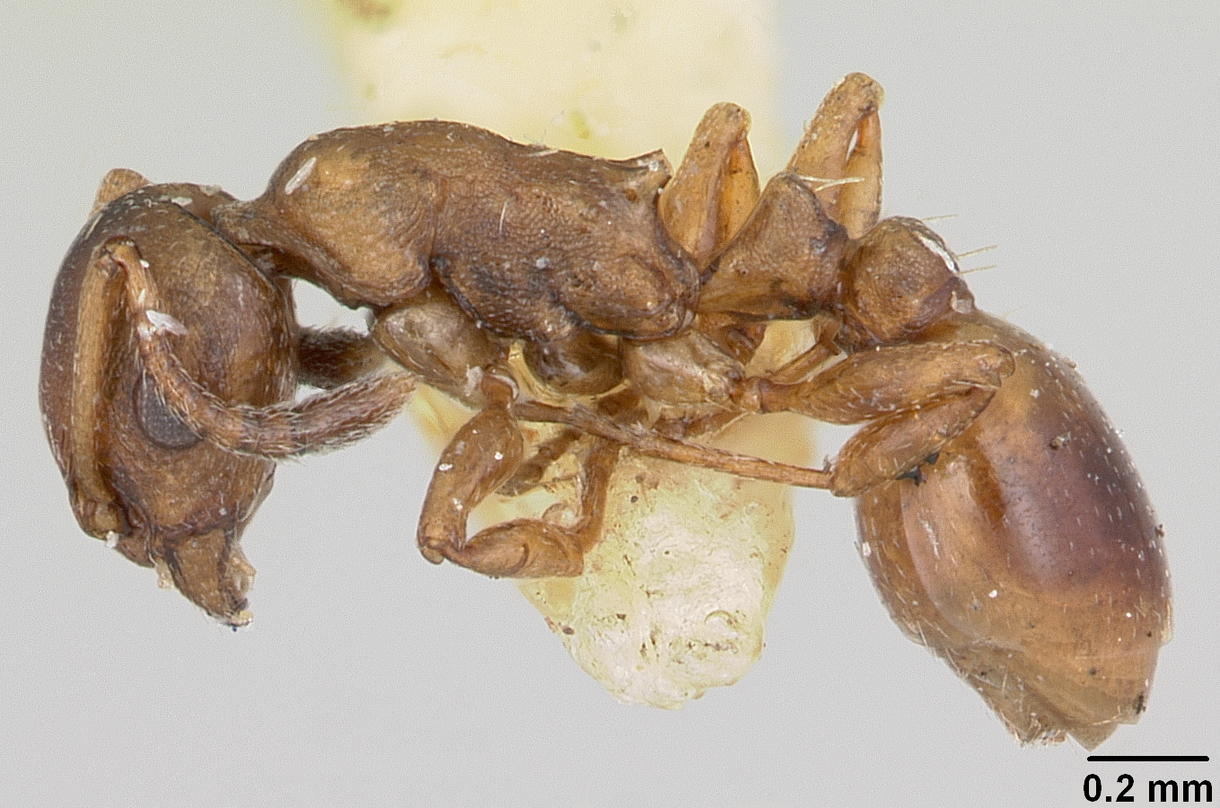

Conservation status
- Vulnerable (IUCN 2.3)

Scientific classification
- Kingdom: Animalia
- Phylum: Arthropoda
- Class: Insecta
- Order: Hymenoptera
- Family: Formicidae
- Subfamily: Myrmicinae
- Genus: Leptothorax
- Species: L. duloticus

Binomial name
- Leptothorax duloticus Wesson, 1937

= Leptothorax duloticus =

Species of ant

Leptothorax duloticus is a species of especially hostile slave-maker ant in the subfamily Myrmicinae. It is endemic to the United States.

It has been observed to engage in a behavior known as alloparental care, which is seen in many other animal species, like the fathead minnow.
