= Odontopodisma montana =

Conservation status
- Least Concern (IUCN 3.1)

Scientific classification
- Kingdom: Animalia
- Phylum: Arthropoda
- Clade: Pancrustacea
- Class: Insecta
- Order: Orthoptera
- Suborder: Caelifera
- Family: Acrididae
- Tribe: Podismini
- Genus: Odontopodisma
- Species: O. montana

Binomial name
- Odontopodisma montana Kis, 1962

Species of grasshopper

Odontopodisma montana, known as the Romanian mountain grasshopper, is a species of insect in family Acrididae. It is found in Hungary and Romania.
