= Samwel Cave cricket =

Conservation status
- Vulnerable (IUCN 2.3)

Scientific classification
- Kingdom: Animalia
- Phylum: Arthropoda
- Class: Insecta
- Order: Orthoptera
- Suborder: Ensifera
- Family: Rhaphidophoridae
- Genus: Pristoceuthophilus
- Species: P. sp. nov.

Binomial name
- Pristoceuthophilus sp. nov.

Species of cricket-like animal

The Samwel Cave cricket is an undescribed species of insect in the family Rhaphidophoridae, which is endemic to California.
