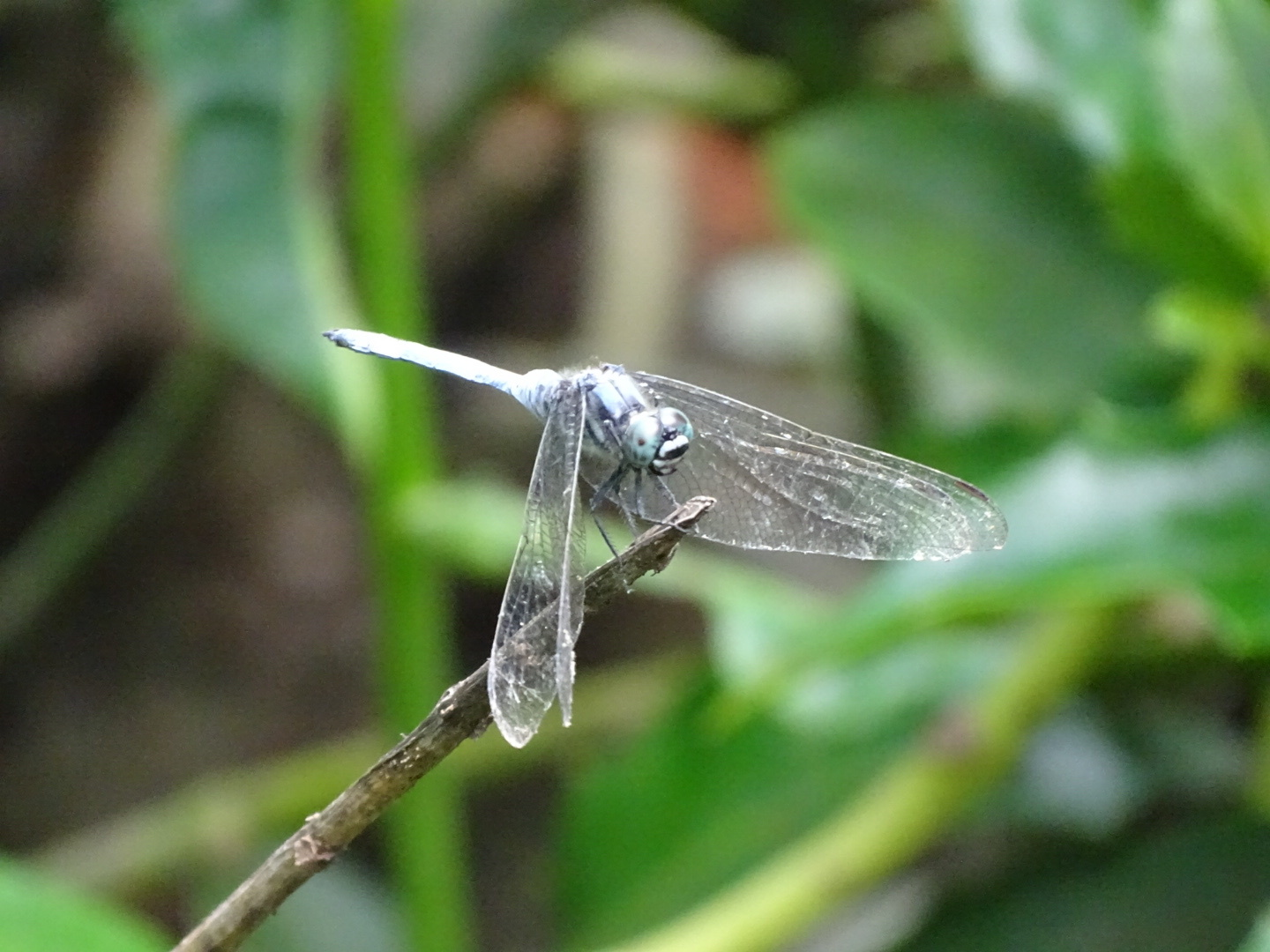

Conservation status
- Vulnerable (IUCN 3.1)

Scientific classification
- Kingdom: Animalia
- Phylum: Arthropoda
- Clade: Pancrustacea
- Class: Insecta
- Order: Odonata
- Infraorder: Anisoptera
- Family: Libellulidae
- Genus: Orthetrum
- Species: O. poecilops

Binomial name
- Orthetrum poecilops Ris, 1919

= Orthetrum poecilops =

Species of dragonfly

Orthetrum poecilops is a species of dragonfly in the family Libellulidae. It is found in China and Hong Kong. Its natural habitats are subtropical or tropical mangrove forests and intertidal flats. It is threatened by habitat loss.
