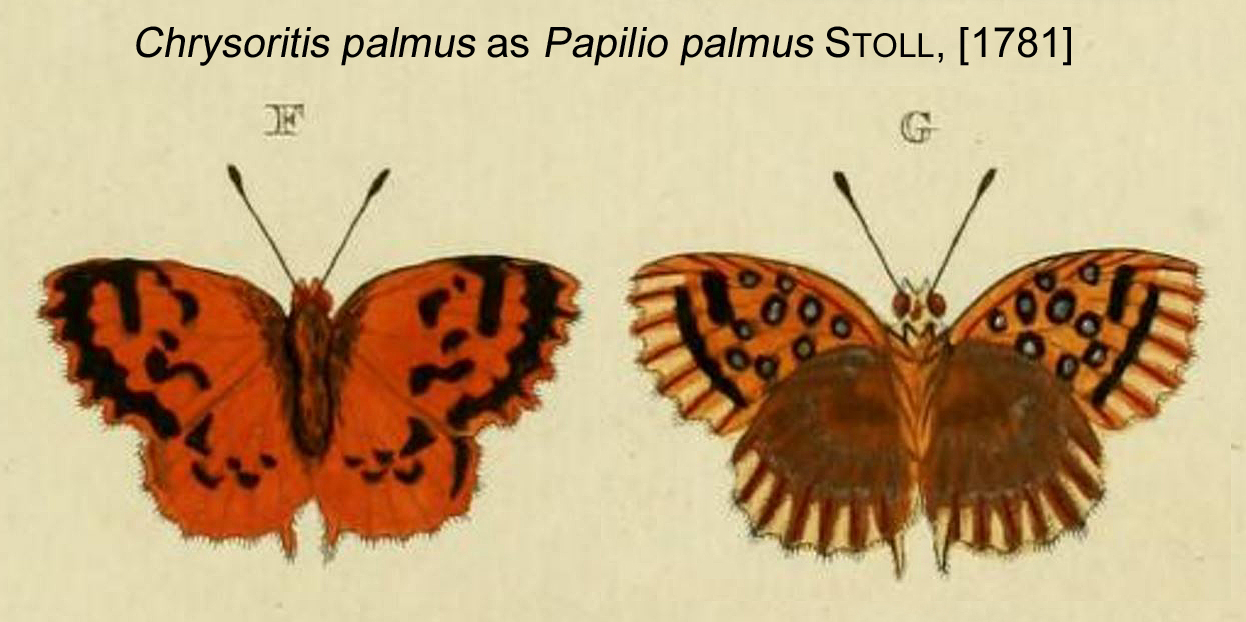

Scientific classification
- Kingdom: Animalia
- Phylum: Arthropoda
- Clade: Pancrustacea
- Class: Insecta
- Order: Lepidoptera
- Family: Lycaenidae
- Genus: Chrysoritis
- Species: C. palmus

Binomial name
- Chrysoritis palmus (Stoll, [1781])

Synonyms
- Papilio palmus Stoll, [1781]; Poecilmitis palmus; Poecilmitis palmus margueritae Dickson, 1982

= Chrysoritis palmus =

Water opal

Species of butterfly

Chrysoritis palmus, the water opal, is a butterfly of the family Lycaenidae. It is found in South Africa.

The wingspan is 21–29 mm for males and 25–31 mm for females. Adults of C. p. palmus are on year from September to April, with a peak in December. The peak for C. p. margueritae is January to March. There are several generations per year.

The larvae feed on Aspalathus sarcantha, Aspalathus carnosa, Chrysanthemoides monilifera, Berzelia intermedia, Berzelia lanuginosa and Berzelia abrotanoides. They are attended to by Crematogaster peringueyi ants.

== Subspecies ==
- Chrysoritis palmus palmus (Western Cape)
- Chrysoritis palmus margueritae (Dickson, 1982) (Western Cape to Eastern Cape)
