= Chrysoritis zonarius =

Donkey daisy copper

Scientific classification
- Domain: Eukaryota
- Kingdom: Animalia
- Phylum: Arthropoda
- Class: Insecta
- Order: Lepidoptera
- Family: Lycaenidae
- Genus: Chrysoritis
- Species: C. zonarius

Binomial name
- Chrysoritis zonarius (Riley, 1938)

Synonyms
- Phasis zeuxo zonarius Riley, 1938; Chrysoritis coetzeri Dickson & Wykeham, 1994 – Coetzer's daisy copper

Species of butterfly

Chrysoritis zonarius, the donkey daisy copper or Coetzer's daisy copper, is a butterfly of the family Lycaenidae. It is found in South Africa, along the coast and inland from the Cape Peninsula, north-west to Paleisheuwel and Lambert's Bay and along the hills to the Western Cape.

The wingspan measures 18–22 mm for males and 20–24 mm for females. The adult butterflies are active from September to November. There is one generation of this species per year.

The larvae feed on Chrysanthemoides incana. They are attended to by Crematogaster peringueyi ants.

== Subspecies ==
- Chrysoritis zonarius zonarius (South Africa: Western Cape)
- Chrysoritis zonarius coetzeri Dickson & Wykeham, 1994 (South Africa: Northern Cape)
