= Chrysoritis brooksi =

Brook's opal

Scientific classification
- Kingdom: Animalia
- Phylum: Arthropoda
- Clade: Pancrustacea
- Class: Insecta
- Order: Lepidoptera
- Family: Lycaenidae
- Genus: Chrysoritis
- Species: C. brooksi

Binomial name
- Chrysoritis brooksi (Riley, 1938)

Synonyms
- Poecilmitis thysbe brooksi Riley, 1938; Poecilmitis brooksi tearei Dickson, 1966

Species of butterfly

Chrysoritis brooksi, the Brook's opal, is a butterfly of the family Lycaenidae found only in South Africa.

The wingspan is 26–30 mm for males and 28–32 mm for females. Its flight period is from September to April, occasionally as late as June.

Larvae feed on Thesium and Zygophyllum species. They are associated with Crematogaster peringueyi ants.

== Subspecies ==
- Chrysoritis brooksi brooksi (South Africa: Western Cape Province)
- Chrysoritis brooksi tearei (Dickson, 1966) (South Africa: Western Cape Province)
