= Chrysoritis penningtoni =

Pennington's opal

Conservation status
- Vulnerable (IUCN 3.1)

Scientific classification
- Kingdom: Animalia
- Phylum: Arthropoda
- Clade: Pancrustacea
- Class: Insecta
- Order: Lepidoptera
- Family: Lycaenidae
- Genus: Chrysoritis
- Species: C. penningtoni

Binomial name
- Chrysoritis penningtoni (Riley, 1938)

Synonyms
- Poecilmitis penningtoni Riley, 1938

Species of butterfly

Chrysoritis penningtoni, the Pennington's opal, is a species of butterfly in the family Lycaenidae. It is endemic to South Africa, where it is found on the high slopes of the Amatolas in the Eastern Cape.

The wingspan is 18–22 mm for males and 20–24 mm for females. Adults are on wing from October to March, with a peak in December.
