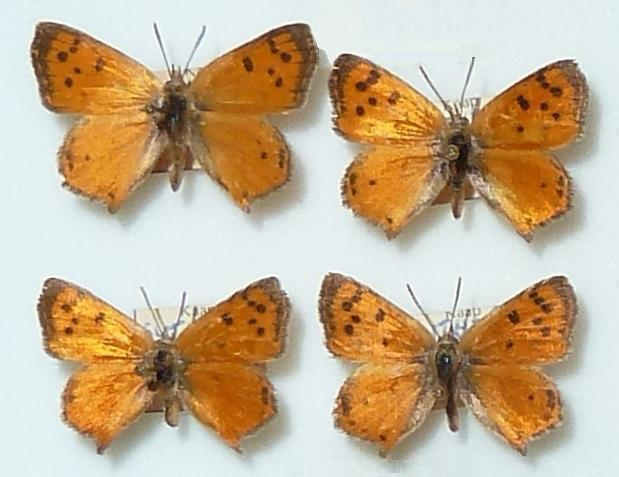
- Set of C. f. dukei

Scientific classification
- Kingdom: Animalia
- Phylum: Arthropoda
- Clade: Pancrustacea
- Class: Insecta
- Order: Lepidoptera
- Family: Lycaenidae
- Genus: Chrysoritis
- Species: C. felthami

Binomial name
- Chrysoritis felthami (Trimen, 1904)

Synonyms
- Zeritis felthami Trimen, 1904; Poecilmitis felthami; Poecilmitis felthami dukei Dickson, 1967

= Chrysoritis felthami =

Feltham's opal

Species of butterfly

Chrysoritis felthami, the Feltham's opal, is a butterfly of the family Lycaenidae. It is found in South Africa. It was originally described by Roland Trimen under the name Zeritis felthami. This species was named in honour of Henry Louis Langley Feltham.

The wingspan is 22–27 mm for males and 23–33 mm for females. Adults are on wing from August to April with peaks in October and February. There are several generations per year.

The larvae feed on Zygophyllum flexuosum and Zygophyllum sessilifolium. They are attended to by Crematogaster peringueyi ants.

== Subspecies ==
- Chrysoritis felthami felthami (coastal fynbos in Western Cape)
- Chrysoritis felthami dukei (Dickson, 1967) (Steinkopf area in Northern Cape to Western Cape)
