= Chrysoritis perseus =

Perseus opal

Conservation status
- Least Concern (IUCN 3.1)

Scientific classification
- Kingdom: Animalia
- Phylum: Arthropoda
- Clade: Pancrustacea
- Class: Insecta
- Order: Lepidoptera
- Family: Lycaenidae
- Genus: Chrysoritis
- Species: C. perseus

Binomial name
- Chrysoritis perseus (Henning, 1977)

Synonyms
- Poecilmitis perseus Henning, 1977

Species of butterfly

Chrysoritis perseus, the Perseus opal, is a butterfly of the family Lycaenidae found only in South Africa.

== Description ==
The wingspan is 24–28 mm for males and 26–30 mm for females. Flight period is two broods from August to March, peaking November.

== Habitat and behavior ==
Larvae feed on Zygophyllum species.

The pupae are found under host plant Atriplex bolusii and tended to by the ants specie Crematogaster peringueyi.
