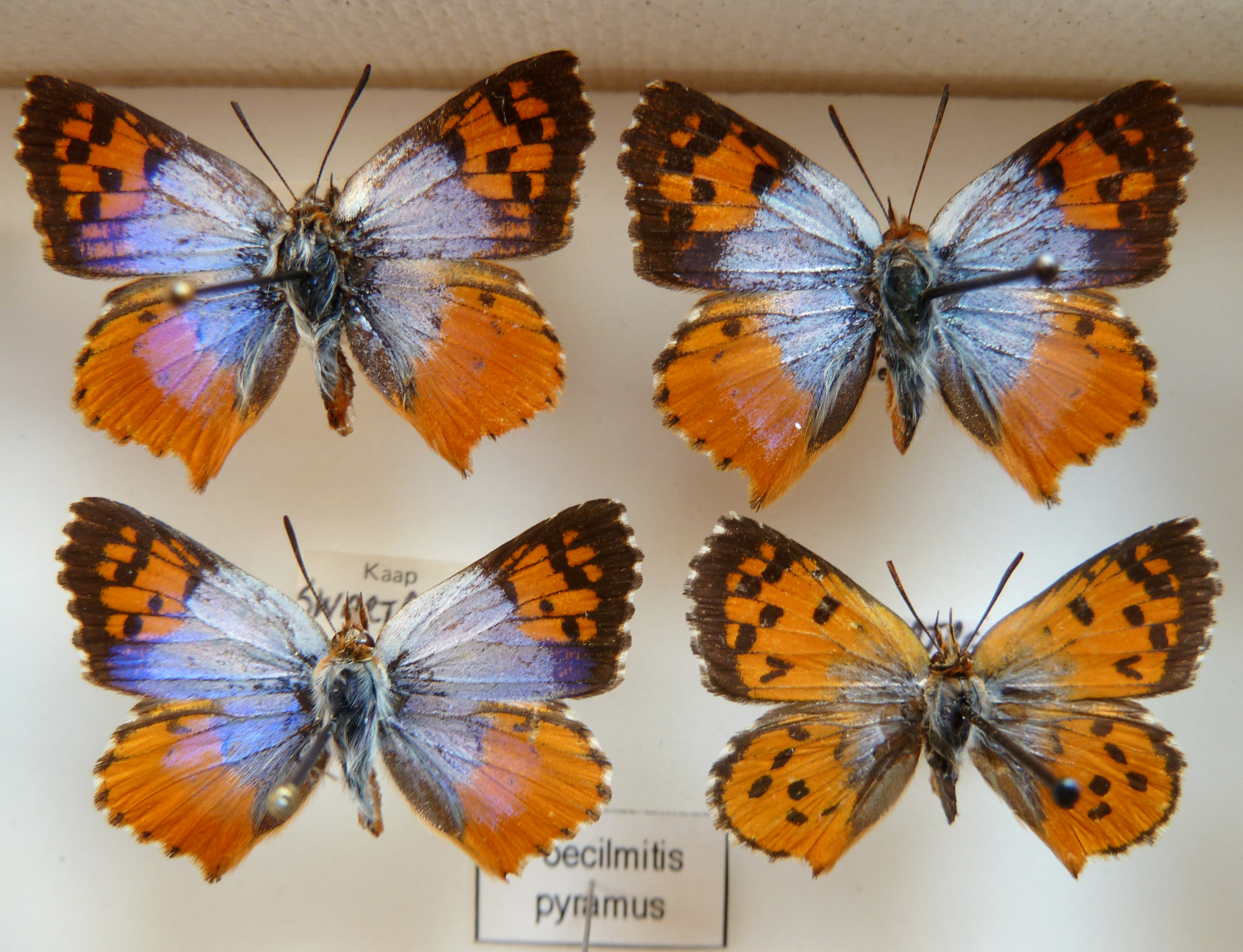

Conservation status
- Vulnerable (IUCN 2.3)

Scientific classification
- Kingdom: Animalia
- Phylum: Arthropoda
- Clade: Pancrustacea
- Class: Insecta
- Order: Lepidoptera
- Family: Lycaenidae
- Genus: Chrysoritis
- Species: C. pyramus

Binomial name
- Chrysoritis pyramus (Pennington, 1953)

Synonyms
- Poecilmitis pyramus Pennington, 1953; Poecilmitis balli Dickson & Henning, 1981

= Chrysoritis pyramus =

Pyramus opal

Species of butterfly

Chrysoritis pyramus, the Pyramus opal, is a species of butterfly in the family Lycaenidae. It is endemic to South Africa, where it is found on the northern slopes of the Swartberg, the Kammanassie Mountains and the Langeberg in the Western Cape.

The wingspan is 32–36 mm for males and 32–38 mm for females. Adults are on wing from October to January, with a peak in November. There is one extended generation per year.

The larvae feed on Thesium, Osteospermum asperulum and Dimorphotheca montana. They are attended to by Crematogaster peringueyi ants.

== Subspecies ==
- Chrysoritis pyramus pyramus (South Africa: Western Cape)
- Chrysoritis pyramus balli (Dickson & Henning, 1981) (South Africa: Western Cape)
