= Chrysoritis trimeni =

Trimen's opal

Conservation status
- Vulnerable (IUCN 3.1)

Scientific classification
- Kingdom: Animalia
- Phylum: Arthropoda
- Clade: Pancrustacea
- Class: Insecta
- Order: Lepidoptera
- Family: Lycaenidae
- Genus: Chrysoritis
- Species: C. trimeni

Binomial name
- Chrysoritis trimeni (Riley, 1938)

Synonyms
- Poecilmitis thysbe trimeni Riley, 1938

Species of butterfly

Chrysoritis trimeni, the Trimen's opal, is a species of butterfly in the family Lycaenidae. It is endemic to South Africa, where it is found in the Northern Cape.

The wingspan is 26–30 mm for males and 28–34 mm for females. Adults are on wing from August to March, with a peak in November.
