= Dark opal (disambiguation) =

Dark opal can refer to:

- Dark opal, the common name for Chrysoritis nigricans, a butterfly species found in South Africa
- Dark opal, a type of mineral
- Dark Opal (DC Comics), a DC Comic supervillain
- Dark opal basil, a type of plant
