= Chrysoritis violescens =

Violet opal

Conservation status
- Least Concern (IUCN 3.1)

Scientific classification
- Kingdom: Animalia
- Phylum: Arthropoda
- Clade: Pancrustacea
- Class: Insecta
- Order: Lepidoptera
- Family: Lycaenidae
- Genus: Chrysoritis
- Species: C. violescens

Binomial name
- Chrysoritis violescens (Dickson, 1971)

Synonyms
- Poecilmitis violescens Dickson, 1971

Species of butterfly

Chrysoritis violescens, the violet opal, is a butterfly of the family Lycaenidae found only in South Africa.

The wingspan is 26–30 mm for males and 30–38 mm for females. Its flight period is from August to December.

The larvae feed on Dimorphotheca cuneata. They are attended to by Crematogaster peringueyi ants.
