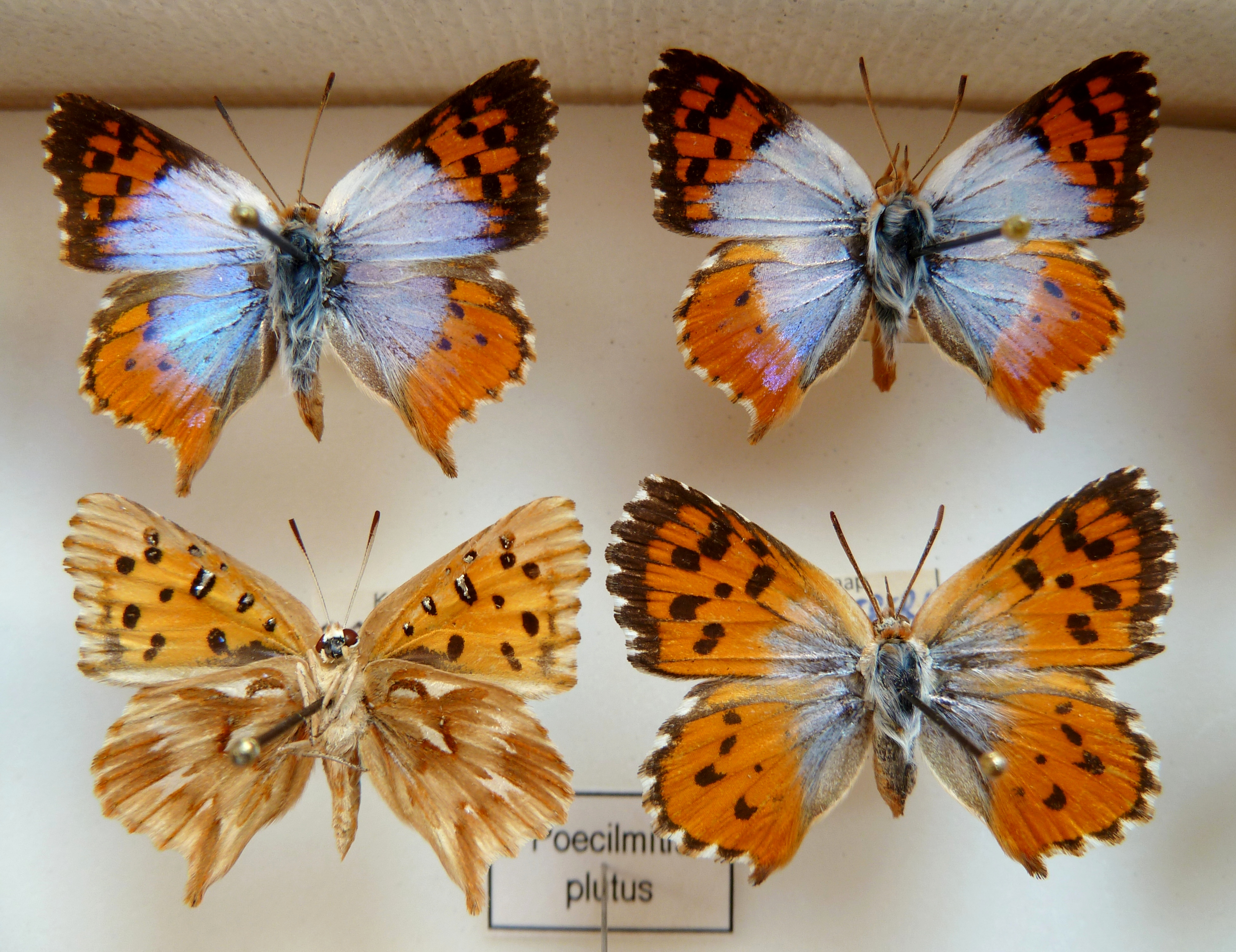

Conservation status
- Least Concern (IUCN 3.1)

Scientific classification
- Kingdom: Animalia
- Phylum: Arthropoda
- Clade: Pancrustacea
- Class: Insecta
- Order: Lepidoptera
- Family: Lycaenidae
- Genus: Chrysoritis
- Species: C. plutus

Binomial name
- Chrysoritis plutus (Pennington, 1967)

Synonyms
- Poecilmitis plutus Pennington, 1967

= Chrysoritis plutus =

Plutus opal

Species of butterfly

Chrysoritis plutus, the Plutus opal, is a butterfly of the family Lycaenidae found only in South Africa.

The wingspan is 24–28 mm for males and 26–35 mm for females. Flight period is two broods from August to December and January to April.

Larvae feed on the Thesium species. They are associated with Crematogaster peringueyi ants.
