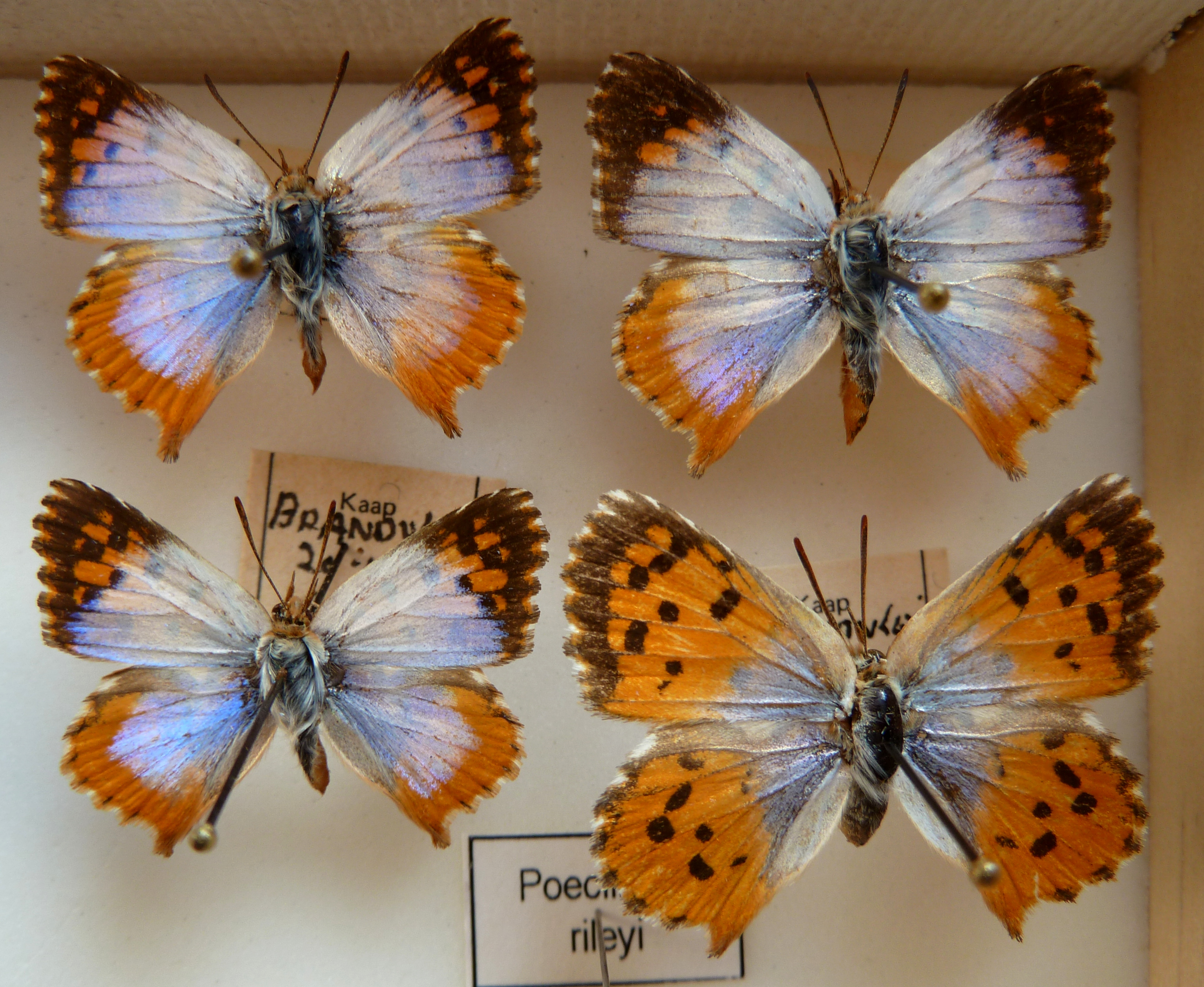

Conservation status
- Endangered (IUCN 3.1)

Scientific classification
- Kingdom: Animalia
- Phylum: Arthropoda
- Clade: Pancrustacea
- Class: Insecta
- Order: Lepidoptera
- Family: Lycaenidae
- Genus: Chrysoritis
- Species: C. rileyi

Binomial name
- Chrysoritis rileyi (Dickson, 1966)

Synonyms
- Poecilmitis rileyi Dickson, 1966

= Chrysoritis rileyi =

Riley's opal

Species of butterfly

Chrysoritis rileyi, the Riley's opal, is a species of butterfly in the family Lycaenidae. It is endemic to South Africa, where it is known only from hill slopes and river flats at the east end of the Brandvlei Dam in the Western Cape.

The wingspan is 30–35 mm (1.2–1.4 in) for males and 32–38 mm (1.3–1.5 in) for females. Adults are on wing from September to April, with peaks from October to November and in March.

The larvae feed on Thesium and Zygophyllum species. They are attended to by Crematogaster peringueyi ants.
