= Chrysoritis turneri =

Turner's opal

Scientific classification
- Kingdom: Animalia
- Phylum: Arthropoda
- Clade: Pancrustacea
- Class: Insecta
- Order: Lepidoptera
- Family: Lycaenidae
- Genus: Chrysoritis
- Species: C. turneri

Binomial name
- Chrysoritis turneri (Riley, 1938)

Synonyms
- Poecilmitis turneri Riley, 1938; Poeclimitis wykehami Dickson, 1980

Species of butterfly

Chrysoritis turneri, the Turner's opal, is a butterfly of the family Lycaenidae. It is found in South Africa.

The wingspan is 22–26 mm for males and 33–40 mm for females. Adults are on year from September to April, with peaks in October and February (for C. t. turneri) and December (for C. t. amatola).

The larvae feed on Zygophyllum species, Dimorphotheca cuneata and Osteospermum. They are attended to by Crematogaster liengmei ants.

== Subspecies ==
- Chrysoritis turneri turneri (Western Cape, southern Namaqualand)
- Chrysoritis turneri amatola (Dickson & McMaster, 1967) (Eastern Cape, Lesotho)
- Chrysoritis turneri wykehami (Dickson, 1980) (South Africa: Northern Cape)
