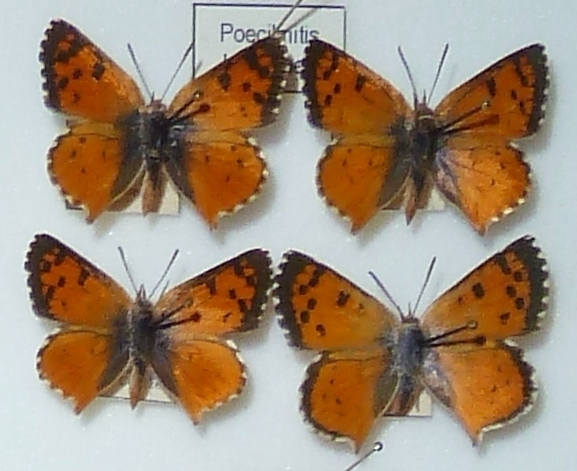

Conservation status
- Vulnerable (IUCN 2.3)

Scientific classification
- Kingdom: Animalia
- Phylum: Arthropoda
- Clade: Pancrustacea
- Class: Insecta
- Order: Lepidoptera
- Family: Lycaenidae
- Genus: Chrysoritis
- Species: C. wykehami

Binomial name
- Chrysoritis wykehami (Dickson, 1980)

Synonyms
- Poecilmitis wykehami Dickson, 1980

= Chrysoritis wykehami =

Species of butterfly

Chrysoritis wykehami is a species of butterfly in the family Lycaenidae. It is endemic to South Africa. It is often considered a subspecies of Chrysoritis turneri.

== Sources ==
- Gimenez Dixon, M. (1996). "Poecilmitis wykehami". IUCN Red List of Threatened Species. 1996 e.T17860A7578642. doi:10.2305/IUCN.UK.1996.RLTS.T17860A7578642.en.
