= Chrysoritis chrysantas =

Karoo daisy copper

Scientific classification
- Kingdom: Animalia
- Phylum: Arthropoda
- Clade: Pancrustacea
- Class: Insecta
- Order: Lepidoptera
- Family: Lycaenidae
- Genus: Chrysoritis
- Species: C. chrysantas

Binomial name
- Chrysoritis chrysantas (Trimen, 1868)

Synonyms
- Zeritis chrysantas Trimen, 1868

Species of butterfly

Chrysoritis chrysantas, the Karoo daisy copper, is a butterfly of the family Lycaenidae. It is found in South Africa, where it is known from the Northern Cape to the Western Cape.

The wingspan is 22–25 mm for males and 27–30 mm for females. Adults are on wing from August to November and from March to May. There are two generations per year.
