= Chrysoritis braueri =

Brauer's opal

Conservation status
- Least Concern (IUCN 2.3)

Scientific classification
- Kingdom: Animalia
- Phylum: Arthropoda
- Clade: Pancrustacea
- Class: Insecta
- Order: Lepidoptera
- Family: Lycaenidae
- Genus: Chrysoritis
- Species: C. braueri

Binomial name
- Chrysoritis braueri (Pennington, 1967)

Synonyms
- Poecilmitis braueri Pennington, 1967

Species of butterfly

Chrysoritis braueri, the Brauer's opal, is a butterfly of the family Lycaenidae found only in South Africa.

The wingspan is 20–24 mm for males and 21–26 mm for females. Its flight period is from August to November and February to April in two broods.

Larvae feed on Zygophyllum species and Myrsine africana. They are associated with Crematogaster species ants.
