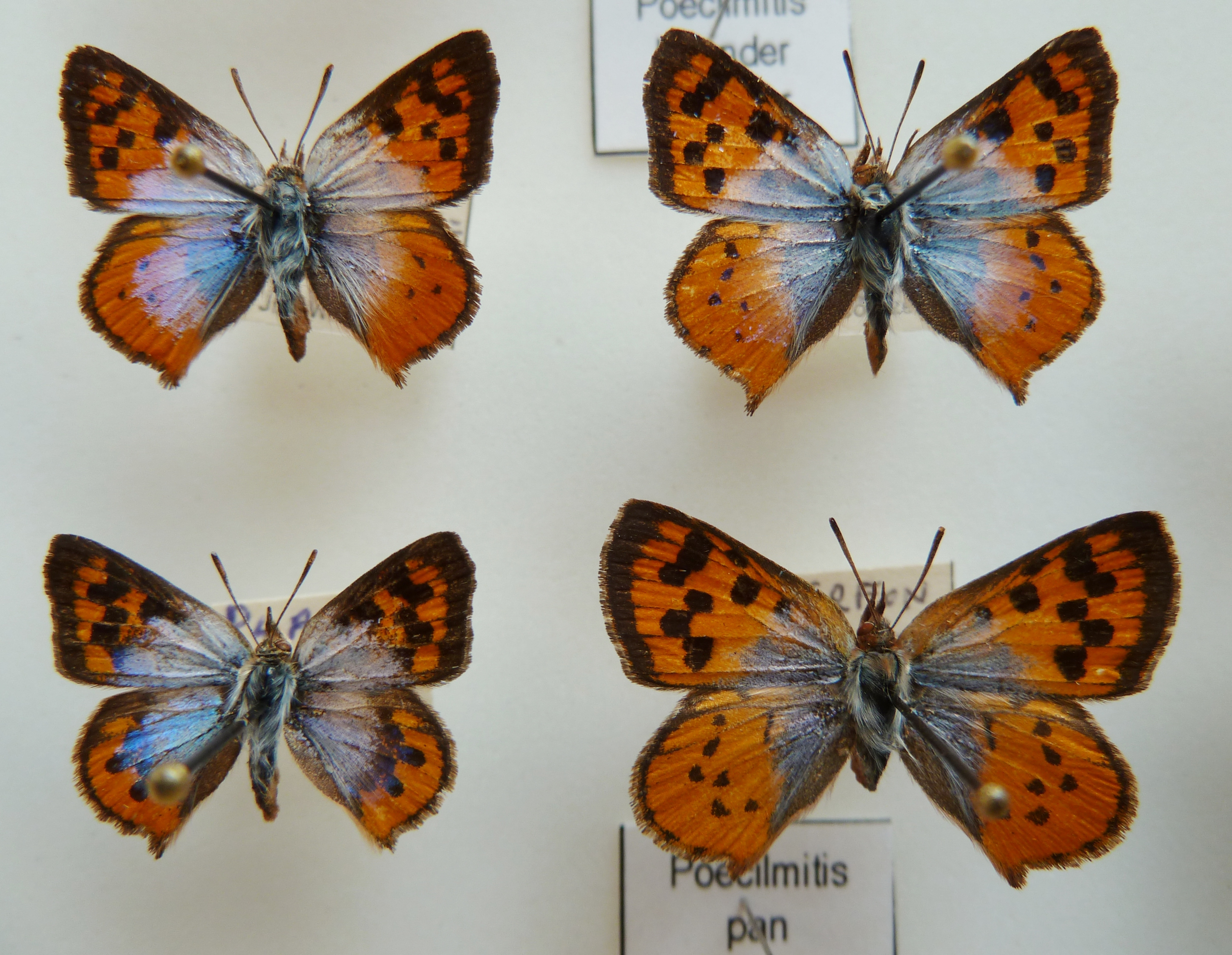
- Set of Chrysoritis pan pan

Conservation status
- Data Deficient (IUCN 2.3)

Scientific classification
- Kingdom: Animalia
- Phylum: Arthropoda
- Clade: Pancrustacea
- Class: Insecta
- Order: Lepidoptera
- Family: Lycaenidae
- Genus: Chrysoritis
- Species: C. pan

Binomial name
- Chrysoritis pan (Pennington, 1962)

Synonyms
- Poecilmitis pan Pennington, 1962; Poecilmitis lysander Pennington, 1962; Poecilmitis atlantica Dickson, 1966; Poecilmitis lysander hantamsbergae Dickson, 1978; Poecilmitis williami Heath, 1997; Poecilmitis dicksoni Henning, 1977; Poecilmitis henningi Bampton, 1981

= Chrysoritis pan =

Pan opal

Species of butterfly

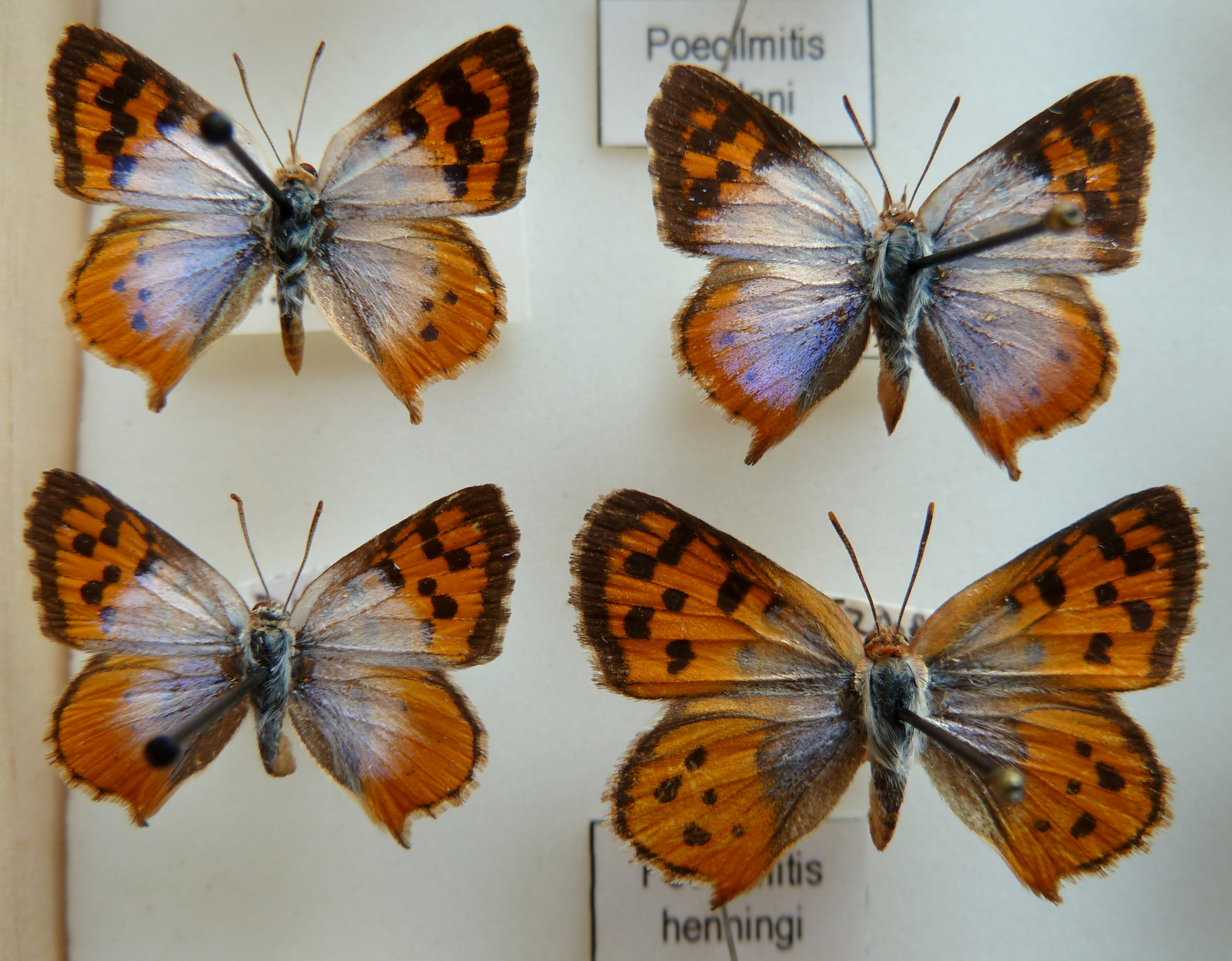
Chrysoritis pan henningi

Chrysoritis pan, the Pan opal, is a species of butterfly in the family Lycaenidae. It is endemic to South Africa, where it is found in the Western Cape, the Northern Cape and the Eastern Cape.

The wingspan is 20–28 mm for males and 22–32 mm for females. Adults are on wing from August to May, with peaks from October to November and from February to March.

The larvae feed on Osteospermum species, Chrysanthemoides incana and Zygophyllum retrofractum. They are attended to by Crematogaster liengmei ants.

== Subspecies ==
- Chrysoritis pan pan (South Africa: Western Cape)
- Chrysoritis pan lysander (Pennington, 1962) (South Africa: Eastern Cape, Western Cape, Northern Cape)
- Chrysoritis pan henningi (Bampton, 1981) (South Africa: Western Cape)

Subspecies Chrysoritis pan henningi was formerly treated as species Chrysoritis henningi.
