= Chrysoritis cotrelli =

Conservation status
- Critically Endangered (IUCN 2.3)

Scientific classification
- Kingdom: Animalia
- Phylum: Arthropoda
- Clade: Pancrustacea
- Class: Insecta
- Order: Lepidoptera
- Family: Lycaenidae
- Genus: Chrysoritis
- Species: C. cotrelli

Binomial name
- Chrysoritis cotrelli (Dickson, 1975)

Species of butterfly

Chrysoritis cotrelli is a species of butterfly in the family Lycaenidae. It is endemic to Eastern Cape and Western Cape of South Africa. It is mostly considered a subspecies of Chrysoritis zeuxo.
