= Chrysoritis orientalis =

Eastern opal

Conservation status
- Least Concern (IUCN 3.1)

Scientific classification
- Kingdom: Animalia
- Phylum: Arthropoda
- Clade: Pancrustacea
- Class: Insecta
- Order: Lepidoptera
- Family: Lycaenidae
- Genus: Chrysoritis
- Species: C. orientalis

Binomial name
- Chrysoritis orientalis (Swanepoel, 1976)

Synonyms
- Poecilmitis orientalis Swanepoel, 1976

Species of butterfly

Chrysoritis orientalis, the eastern opal, is a species of butterfly in the family Lycaenidae. It is endemic to South Africa, where it is found on the southern Drakensberg in KwaZulu-Natal.

The wingspan is 18–22 mm for males and 20–24 mm for females. Adults are on wing from October to January, with a peak in December. There is one generation per year.

The larvae feed on Thesium species. They are attended to by Crematogaster liengmei ants.
