= Chrysoritis zeuxo =

Scientific classification
- Kingdom: Animalia
- Phylum: Arthropoda
- Clade: Pancrustacea
- Class: Insecta
- Order: Lepidoptera
- Family: Lycaenidae
- Genus: Chrysoritis
- Species: C. zeuxo

Binomial name
- Chrysoritis zeuxo (Linnaeus, 1764)

Synonyms
- Papilio zeuxo Linnaeus, 1764; Poecilmitis cottrelli Dickson, 1975

Species of butterfly

Chrysoritis zeuxo, the jitterbug daisy copper, is a butterfly of the family Lycaenidae. It is found in South Africa, where it is known from coastal fynbos in the Western Cape, from the Cape Peninsula to the Knysna area.

The wingspan is 22–25 mm for males and 24–28 mm for females. Adults are on wing from September to January, with a peak from October to November. There is one generation per year.

The larvae feed on Chrysanthemoides monilifera. They are attended to by Crematogaster liengmei ants.

== Subspecies ==
Chrysoritis zeuxo cottrelli (Dickson, 1975) is either treated as a valid species or subspecies of Chrysoritis zeuxo.
