= Chrysoritis adonis =

Adonis opal

Conservation status
- Endangered (IUCN 3.1)

Scientific classification
- Kingdom: Animalia
- Phylum: Arthropoda
- Class: Insecta
- Order: Lepidoptera
- Family: Lycaenidae
- Genus: Chrysoritis
- Species: C. adonis

Binomial name
- Chrysoritis adonis (Pennington, 1962)

Synonyms
- Poecilmitis adonis Pennington, 1962

Species of butterfly

Chrysoritis adonis, the Adonis opal, is a species of butterfly in the family Lycaenidae. It is endemic to South Africa, where it is found on the northern slopes of the Gydoberg, the Skurweberg, the Baviaanskloofberg and the Waboomberg, as well as the Elandskloof near Seweweekspoort.

The wingspan is 29–36 mm (1.1–1.4 in) for males and 30–37 mm (1.2–1.5 in) for females. Adults are on wing from October to March, with peaks in November and January. There are multiple generations per year.

The larvae feed on Thesium and Zygophyllum species. They are attended to by Crematogaster liengmei ants.

== Subspecies ==
- Chrysoritis adonis adonis (South Africa: Western Cape province)
- Chrysoritis adonis aridimontis Heath & Pringle, 2007 (South Africa: Western Cape province)
