= Chrysoritis irene =

Conservation status
- Least Concern (IUCN 3.1)

Scientific classification
- Kingdom: Animalia
- Phylum: Arthropoda
- Clade: Pancrustacea
- Class: Insecta
- Order: Lepidoptera
- Family: Lycaenidae
- Genus: Chrysoritis
- Species: C. irene

Binomial name
- Chrysoritis irene (Pennington, 1968)

Synonyms
- Poecilmitis irene Pennington, 1968

Species of butterfly in the family Lycaenidae

Chrysoritis irene, the Irene's opal, is a species of butterfly in the family Lycaenidae. It is endemic to South Africa, where it is found in fynbos on the Du Toit's Kloof mountains and Rivieronderendberge in the Western Cape.

The wingspan is 30–32 mm for males and 32–34 mm for females. Adults are on wing from October to April, with peaks in November and March. There are multiple generations per year.

The larvae probably feed on Dimorphotheca species.
