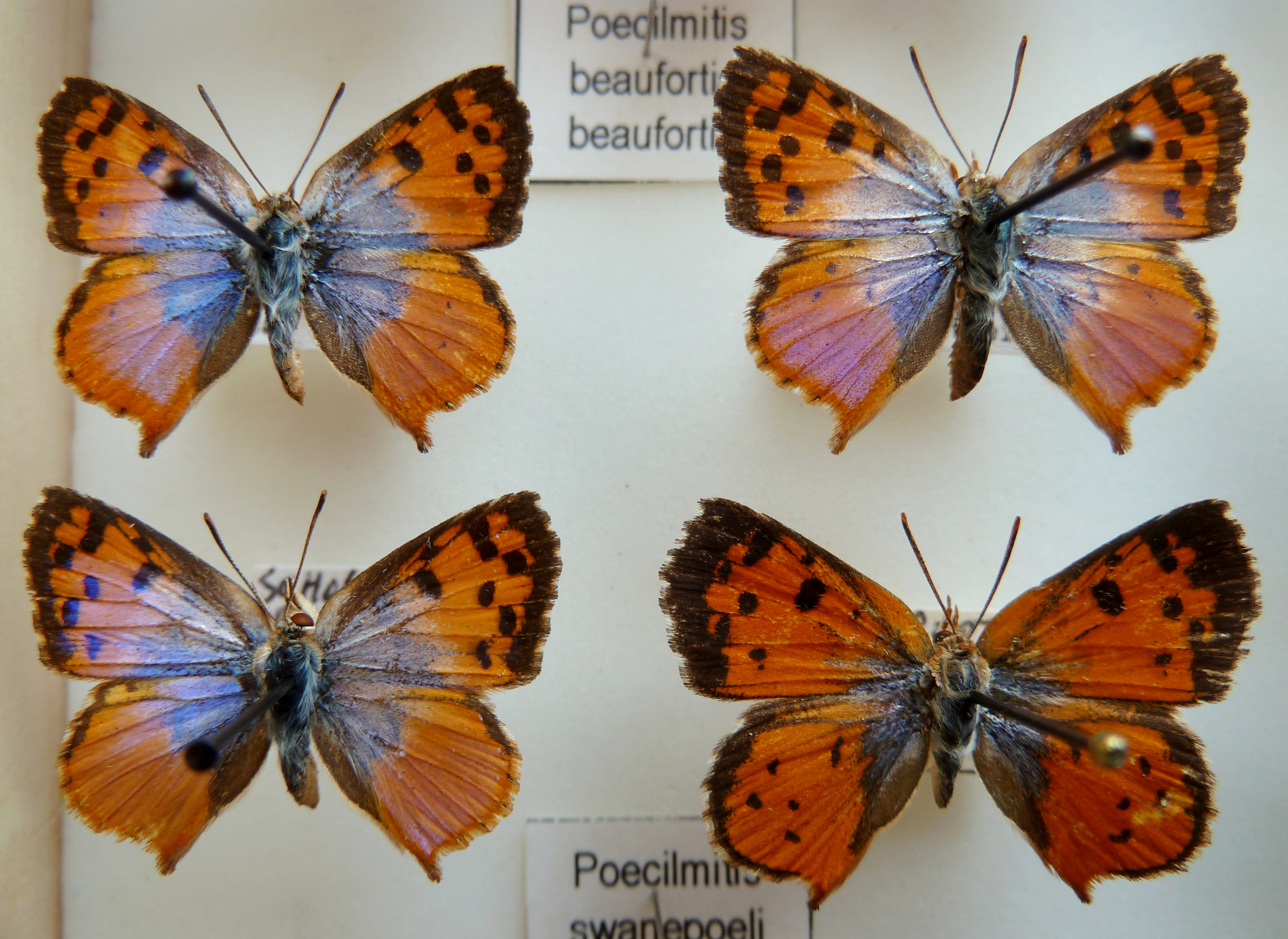

Conservation status
- Endangered (IUCN 2.3)

Scientific classification
- Kingdom: Animalia
- Phylum: Arthropoda
- Clade: Pancrustacea
- Class: Insecta
- Order: Lepidoptera
- Family: Lycaenidae
- Genus: Chrysoritis
- Species: C. swanepoeli

Binomial name
- Chrysoritis swanepoeli (Dickson, 1965)

Synonyms
- Poecilmitis swanepoeli Dickson, 1965; Poecilmitis hyperion Dickson, 1975

= Chrysoritis swanepoeli =

Swanepoel's opal

Species of butterfly

Chrysoritis swanepoeli, the Swanepoel's opal, is a species of butterfly in the family Lycaenidae. It is endemic to South Africa, where it is found in the Swartberg Pass and Schoemanskloof, the Groot Swartberg, the Huis River Pass and Gamkaskloof in the Western Cape.

The wingspan is 23–26 mm for males and 24–34 mm for females. Adults are on wing from October to January. There is one extended generation per year.

The larvae feed on Thesium species and Tylecodon paniculata. They are attended to by Crematogaster liengmei ants.

== Subspecies ==
The subspecies Chrysoritis swanepoeli hyperion was formerly considered a species, Chrysoritis hyperion. Research in 2023 showed subspecies swanepoeli and hyperion to be indistinguishable in one genetic sequence, suggesting more research is required to determine the validity of subspecies status.

- Chrysoritis swanepoeli swanepoeli (South Africa: Western Cape)
- Chrysoritis swanepoeli hyperion (Dickson, 1975) (South Africa: Western Cape)
