= Chrysoritis blencathrae =

Conservation status
- Least Concern (IUCN 3.1)

Scientific classification
- Kingdom: Animalia
- Phylum: Arthropoda
- Clade: Pancrustacea
- Class: Insecta
- Order: Lepidoptera
- Family: Lycaenidae
- Genus: Chrysoritis
- Species: C. blencathrae

Binomial name
- Chrysoritis blencathrae (Heath & Ball, 1992)

Synonyms
- Poecilmitis blencathrae Heath & Ball, 1992

Species of butterfly

Chrysoritis blencathrae, the Waaihoek opal, is a butterfly of the family Lycaenidae. It is found in South Africa, where it is known from the peaks of the Waaihoek and Sybasberg in the Western Cape.

The wingspan is 26–36 mm for males and 30–37 mm for females. Adults are on wing from September to April, with peaks in October and February (for C. b. turneri) and December (for C. b. amatola).

The larvae feed on Dimorphotheca venusta. They are attended by Crematogaster ants.
