= Chrysoritis midas =

Midas opal

Scientific classification
- Kingdom: Animalia
- Phylum: Arthropoda
- Clade: Pancrustacea
- Class: Insecta
- Order: Lepidoptera
- Family: Lycaenidae
- Genus: Chrysoritis
- Species: C. midas

Binomial name
- Chrysoritis midas (Pennington, 1962)

Synonyms
- Poecilmitis midas Pennington, 1962

Species of butterfly

Chrysoritis midas, the Midas opal, is a butterfly of the family Lycaenidae. It is found in South Africa, where it is found from the Roggeveld escarpment to Nuweveldberge in the Western Cape.

The wingspan is 24–28 mm for males and 25–30 mm for females. Adults are on wing from September to November. There is one generation per year.

The larvae feed on Diospyros austro-africana. They are attended to by Crematogaster liengmei ants.
