= Chrysoritis phosphor =

Scientific classification
- Kingdom: Animalia
- Phylum: Arthropoda
- Clade: Pancrustacea
- Class: Insecta
- Order: Lepidoptera
- Family: Lycaenidae
- Genus: Chrysoritis
- Species: C. phosphor

Binomial name
- Chrysoritis phosphor (Trimen, 1866)

Synonyms
- Zeritis phosphor Trimen, 1866; Bowkeria phosphor; Bowkeria phosphor borealis Quickelberge, 1972

Species of butterfly

Chrysoritis phosphor, the scarce scarlet or golden flash, is a butterfly of the family Lycaenidae. The species was first described by Roland Trimen in 1866. It is found in South Africa.

The wingspan is 24–28 mm for males and 26–31 mm for females. Adults are on wing year round, but mainly in November and April.

The associated ant species is unknown but is suspected to be an arboreal Crematogaster species.

== Subspecies ==
- Chrysoritis phosphor phosphor (Eastern Cape)
- Chrysoritis phosphor borealis (Quickelberge, 1972) (KwaZulu-Natal midlands and Mpumalanga)
