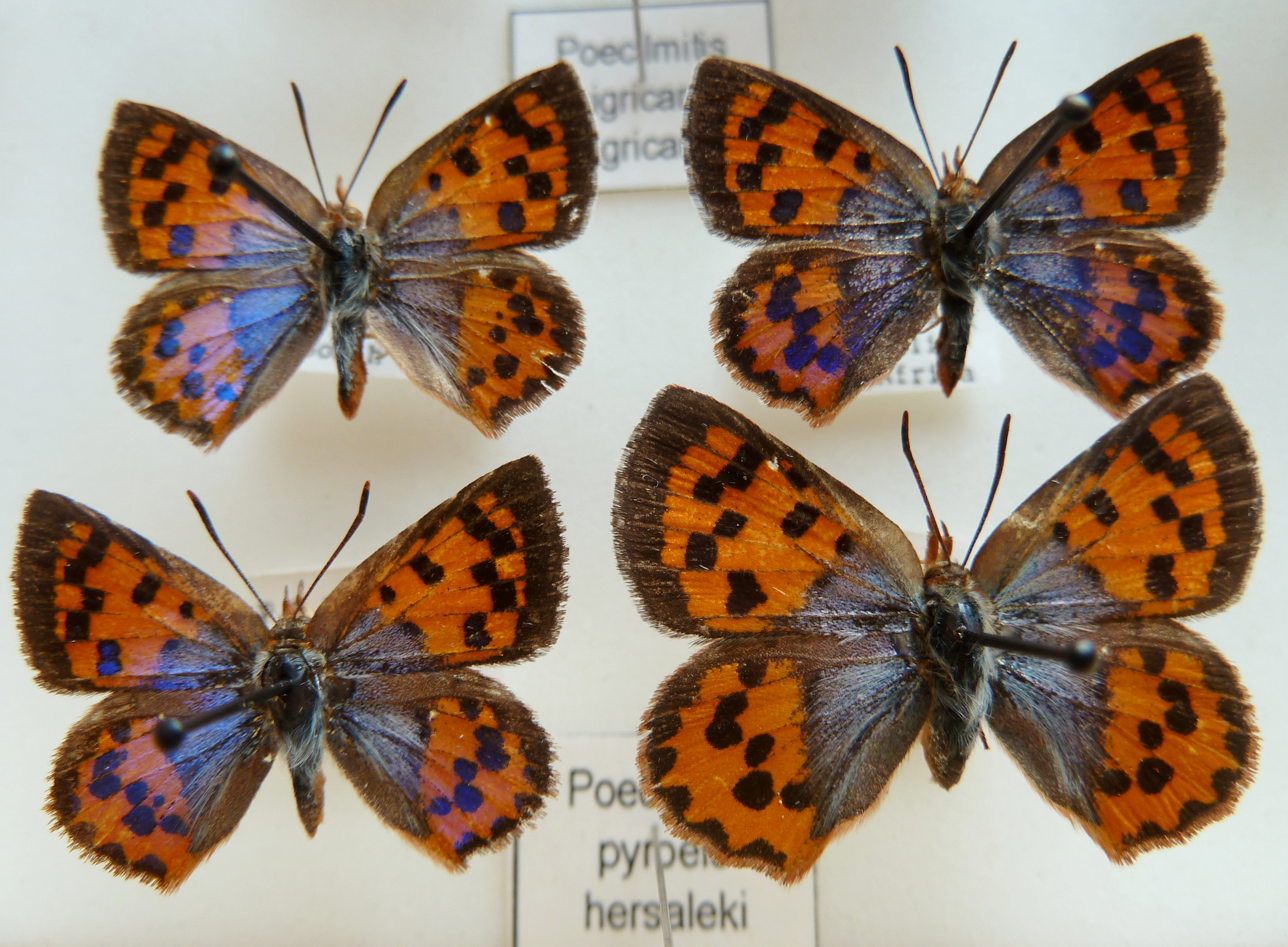
- Set of C. p. hersaleki

Scientific classification
- Kingdom: Animalia
- Phylum: Arthropoda
- Clade: Pancrustacea
- Class: Insecta
- Order: Lepidoptera
- Family: Lycaenidae
- Genus: Chrysoritis
- Species: C. pyroeis

Binomial name
- Chrysoritis pyroeis (Trimen, 1864)

Synonyms
- Zeritis pyroeis Trimen, 1864; Poecilmitis pyroeis; Poecilmitis pyroeis hersaleki Dickson, 1970

= Chrysoritis pyroeis =

Sand-dune opal

Species of butterfly

Chrysoritis pyroeis, the sand-dune opal, is a butterfly of the family Lycaenidae. It is found in South Africa.

The wingspan is 22–31 mm for males and 25–38 mm for females. Adults are on wing from August to April with peaks from September to October and in February. There are several generations per year.

The larvae feed on Zygophyllum flexuosum and Thesium species. They are attended to by Myrmicaria nigra ants.

== Subspecies ==
- Chrysoritis pyroeis pyroeis (Western Cape, along the west coast to the Northern Cape and along the south coast to Stilbaai)
- Chrysoritis pyroeis hersaleki (Dickson, 1970) (fynbos in coastal hills near Port Elizabeth in the Eastern Cape)
