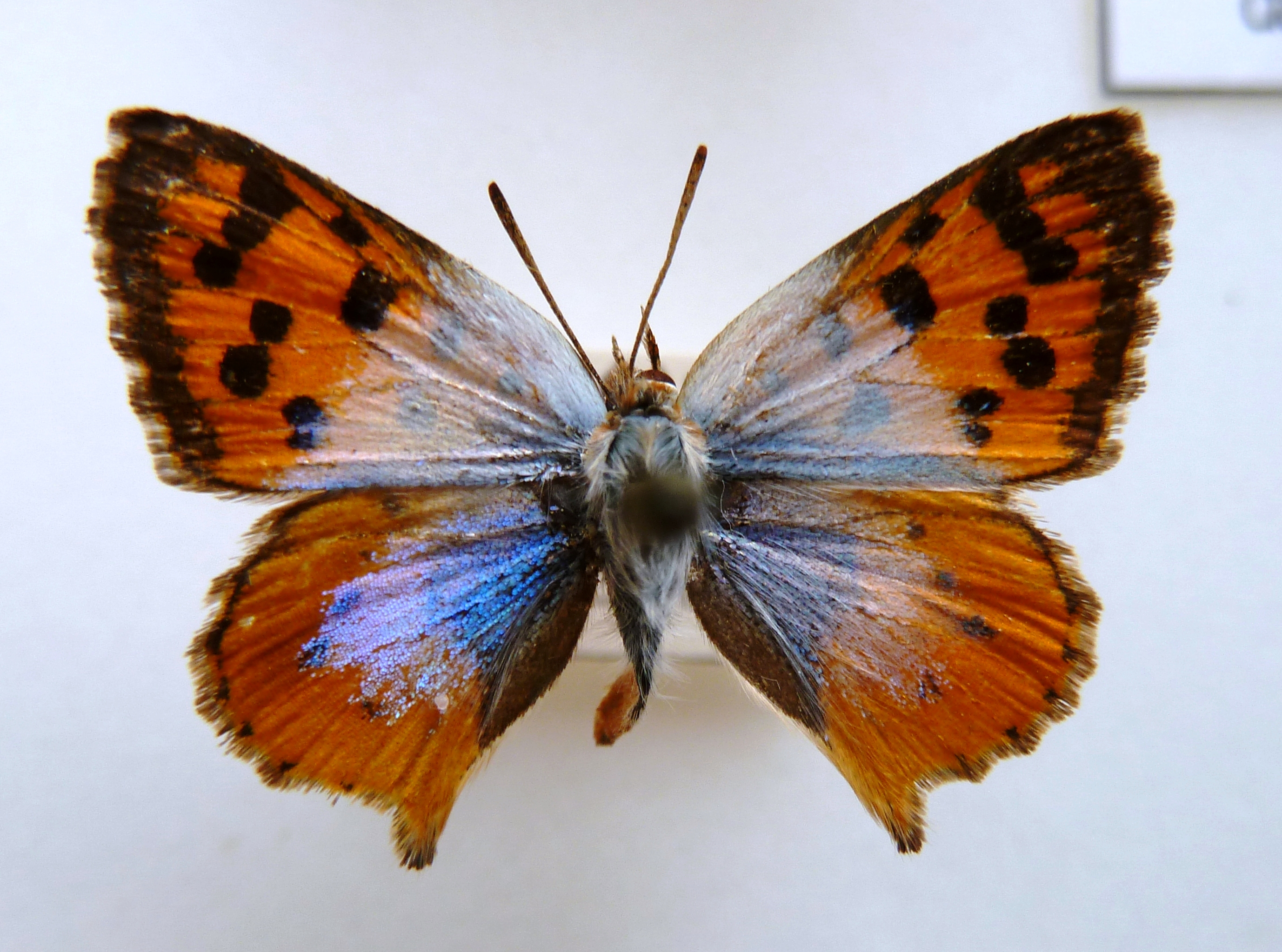
- C. pan subsp. lysander

Scientific classification
- Domain: Eukaryota
- Kingdom: Animalia
- Phylum: Arthropoda
- Class: Insecta
- Order: Lepidoptera
- Family: Lycaenidae
- Subfamily: Aphnaeinae
- Genus: Chrysoritis; Butler, [1897]

Synonyms
- Bowkeria Quickelberge, 1972; Nais Swainson, 1833 (non Müller, 1771; preoccupied); Oxychaeta Tite & Dickson, 1973; Poecilmitis Butler, 1899

= Chrysoritis =

Butterfly genus in family Lycaenidae

Chrysoritis, commonly called opals or coppers, is a genus of butterflies in the family Lycaenidae found mainly in southern Africa and particularly South Africa.

== Species ==
Species of the genus include:

The chrysaor species group:

- Chrysoritis aethon (Trimen, 1887) – Lydenburg opal
- Chrysoritis aureus (van Son, 1966) – Heidelberg copper or golden opal
- Chrysoritis lycegenes (Trimen, 1874) – Mooi River opal
- Chrysoritis lyncurium (Trimen, 1868) – Tsomo River opal or Tsomo River copper
- Chrysoritis midas (Pennington, 1962) – Midas opal
- Chrysoritis natalensis (van Son, 1966) – Natal opal
- Chrysoritis phosphor (Trimen, 1866) – scarce scarlet or golden flash

The chrysantas species group:

- Chrysoritis chrysantas (Trimen, 1868) – Karoo daisy copper

The oreas species group:

- Chrysoritis dicksoni (Gabriel, 1947) – Dickson's copper or Dickson's strandveld copper
- Chrysoritis oreas (Trimen, 1891) – Drakensberg copper or Drakensberg daisy copper

The pyroeis species group:

- Chrysoritis felthami (Trimen, 1904) – Feltham's opal
- Chrysoritis pyroeis (Trimen, 1864) – sand-dune opal

The thysbe species group:

- Chrysoritis adonis (Pennington, 1962) – Adonis opal
- Chrysoritis aridus (Pennington, 1953) – Namaqua opal
- Chrysoritis azurius (Swanepoel, 1975) – azure opal
- Chrysoritis beaufortius (Dickson, 1966) – Beaufort's opal
- Chrysoritis beulah (Quickelberge, 1966) – Beulah's opal
- Chrysoritis blencathrae (Heath & Ball, 1992) – Waaihoek opal
- Chrysoritis braueri (Pennington, 1967) – Brauer's opal
- Chrysoritis brooksi Riley, 1938 – Brook's opal
- Chrysoritis chrysaor (Trimen, 1864) – golden copper or burnished opal
- Chrysoritis daphne (Dickson, 1975) – Daphne's opal
- Chrysoritis endymion (Pennington, 1962) – Endymion opal
- Chrysoritis irene (Pennington, 1968) – Irene's opal
- Chrysoritis nigricans (Aurivillius, 1924) – dark opal
- Chrysoritis orientalis (Swanepoel, 1976) – eastern opal
- Chrysoritis palmus (Stoll, [1781]) – water opal
- Chrysoritis pan (Pennington, 1962) – Pan opal
- Chrysoritis pelion (Pennington, 1953) – Machacha opal
- Chrysoritis penningtoni (Riley, 1938) – Pennington's opal
- Chrysoritis perseus (Henning, 1977) – Perseus opal
- Chrysoritis plutus (Pennington, 1967) – Plutus opal
- Chrysoritis pyramus (Pennington, 1953) – Pyramus opal
- Chrysoritis rileyi (Dickson, 1966) – Riley's opal
- Chrysoritis swanepoeli (Dickson, 1965) – Swanepoel's opal
- Chrysoritis thysbe (Linnaeus, 1764) – opal copper or common opal
- Chrysoritis trimeni (Riley, 1938) – Trimen's opal
- Chrysoritis turneri (Riley, 1938) – Turner's opal
- Chrysoritis uranus (Pennington, 1962) – Uranus opal
- Chrysoritis violescens (Dickson, 1971) – violet opal

The zeuxo species group:

- Chrysoritis coetzeri Dickson & Wykeham, 1994 (may be included in C. zonarius)
- Chrysoritis cotrelli – Cotrell's daisy copper (may be included in C. zeuxo)
- Chrysoritis zeuxo (Linnaeus, 1764) – jitterbug daisy copper
- Chrysoritis zonarius (Riley, 1938) – donkey daisy copper

== Poecilmitis ==
Formerly separated in genus Poecilmitis:

- Poecilmitis adonis now C. adonis
- Poecilmitis aureus now C. aureus
- Poecilmitis azurius now C. azurius
- Poecilmitis balli now C. pyramus balli
- Poecilmitis daphne now C. daphne
- Poecilmitis endymion now C. endymion
- Poecilmitis henningi now C. pan henningi
- Poecilmitis hyperion now C. swanepoeli hyperion
- Poecilmitis irene now C. irene
- Poecilmitis kaplani now C. beaufortius stepheni
- Poecilmitis lyncurium now C. lyncurium
- Poecilmitis lyndseyae now C. thysbe bamptoni
- Poecilmitis orientalis now C. orientalis
- Poecilmitis pan now C. pan
- Poecilmitis penningtoni now C. penningtoni
- Poecilmitis pyramus now C. pyramus
- Poecilmitis rileyi now C. rileyi
- Poecilmitis stepheni now C. beaufortius stepheni
- Poecilmitis swanepoeli now C. swanepoeli
- Poecilmitis trimeni now C. trimeni
- Poecilmitis wykehami now C. turneri wykehami
