= Chrysoritis beulah =

Beulah's opal

Conservation status
- Least Concern (IUCN 3.1)

Scientific classification
- Kingdom: Animalia
- Phylum: Arthropoda
- Clade: Pancrustacea
- Class: Insecta
- Order: Lepidoptera
- Family: Lycaenidae
- Genus: Chrysoritis
- Species: C. beulah

Binomial name
- Chrysoritis beulah (Quickelberge, 1966)

Synonyms
- Poecilmitis beulah Quickelberge, 1966

Species of butterfly

Chrysoritis beulah, the Beulah's opal, is a butterfly of the family Lycaenidae found only in South Africa.

The wingspan is 30–32 millimetres (1.2–1.3 in) for males and 32–34 millimetres (1.3–1.3 in) for females. It has multiple broods over its flight period from October to February.
