= Chrysoritis balli =

Conservation status
- Vulnerable (IUCN 2.3)

Scientific classification
- Kingdom: Animalia
- Phylum: Arthropoda
- Clade: Pancrustacea
- Class: Insecta
- Order: Lepidoptera
- Family: Lycaenidae
- Genus: Chrysoritis
- Species: C. balli

Binomial name
- Chrysoritis balli (Dickson & Henning, 1981)

Synonyms
- Poecilmitis balli Dickson & Henning, 1981

Species of butterfly

Chrysoritis balli is a species of butterfly in the family Lycaenidae. It is endemic to South Africa. It is mostly treated as a subspecies of Chrysoritis pyramus.

== Sources ==
- Gimenez Dixon, M. (1996). "Poecilmitis balli". IUCN Red List of Threatened Species. 1996 e.T17846A7551484. doi:10.2305/IUCN.UK.1996.RLTS.T17846A7551484.en.
