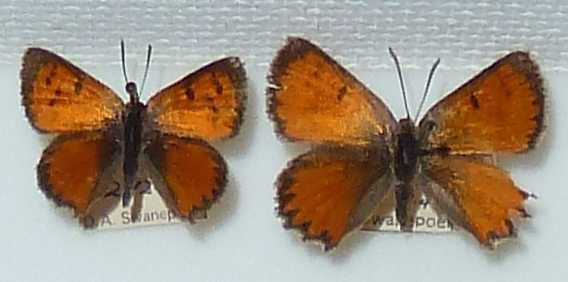

Conservation status
- Vulnerable (IUCN 3.1)

Scientific classification
- Kingdom: Animalia
- Phylum: Arthropoda
- Class: Insecta
- Order: Lepidoptera
- Family: Lycaenidae
- Genus: Chrysoritis
- Species: C. lyncurium

Binomial name
- Chrysoritis lyncurium (Trimen, 1868)

Synonyms
- Zeritis lyncurium Trimen, 1868; Poecilmitis lyncurium

= Tsomo River copper =

Species of butterfly

The Tsomo River copper or Tsomo River opal (Chrysoritis lyncurium) is a species of butterfly in the family Lycaenidae. It is endemic to South Africa, where it is found from the northern Eastern Cape to southern KwaZulu-Natal.

The wingspan is 21–24 mm for males and 23–26 mm for females. Adults are on wing from December to January.

The larvae feed on Myrsine and Diospyros species. They are attended to by Crematogaster ants.

== See also ==
- Tsomo River
