= Chrysoritis daphne =

Daphne's opal

Conservation status
- Least Concern (IUCN 3.1)

Scientific classification
- Kingdom: Animalia
- Phylum: Arthropoda
- Clade: Pancrustacea
- Class: Insecta
- Order: Lepidoptera
- Family: Lycaenidae
- Genus: Chrysoritis
- Species: C. daphne

Binomial name
- Chrysoritis daphne (Dickson, 1975)

Synonyms
- Poecilmitis daphne Dickson, 1975

Species of butterfly

Chrysoritis daphne, the Daphne's opal, is a species of butterfly in the family Lycaenidae. It is endemic to South Africa, where it is found on the southern slopes of the Kammanassie Mountains in the Western Cape.

The wingspan is 25–29 mm for males and 29–31 mm for females. Adults are on wing from November to February. There is one extended generation per year.

The larvae feed on Thesium species. They are attended by Crematogaster liengmei ants.
