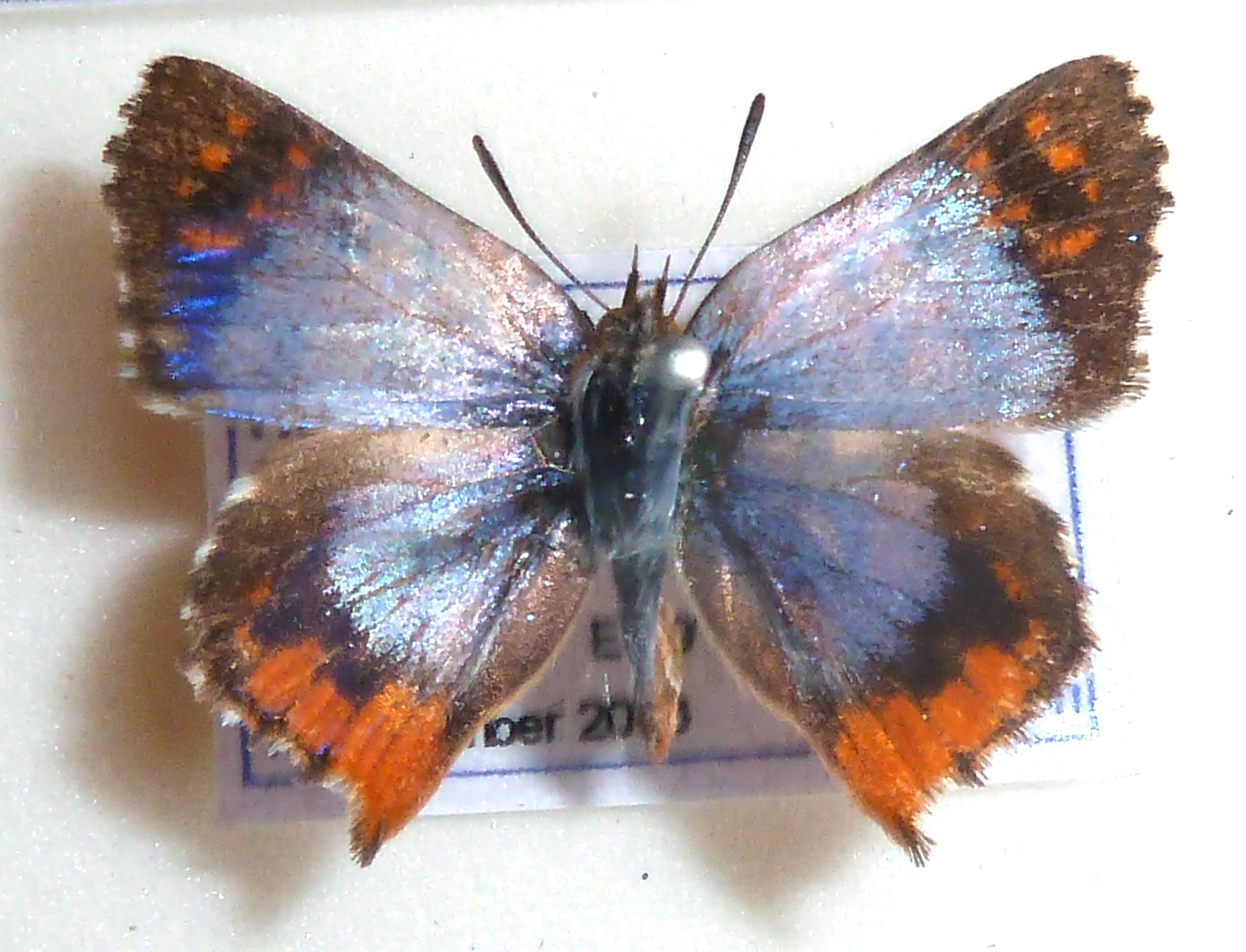

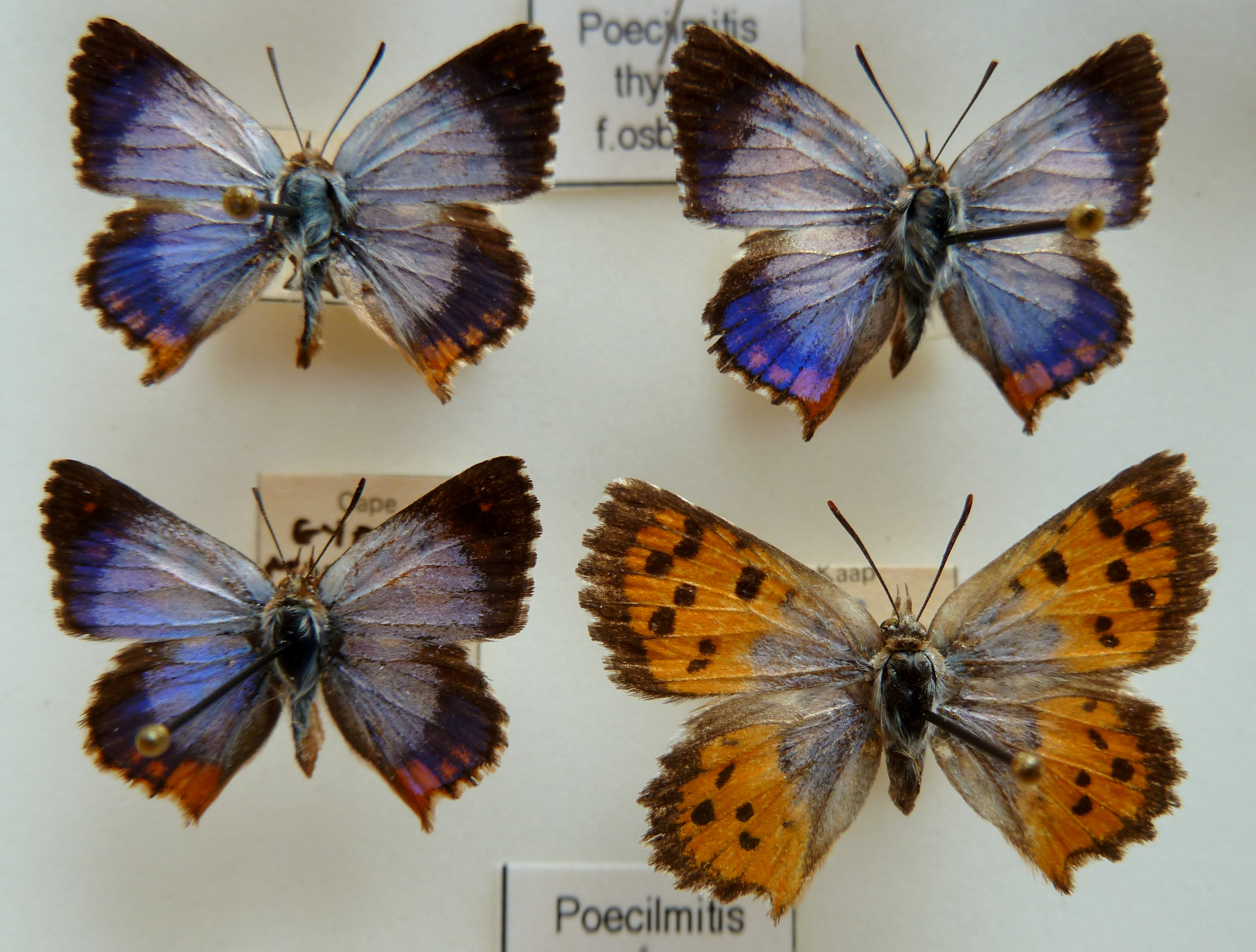

Scientific classification
- Kingdom: Animalia
- Phylum: Arthropoda
- Clade: Pancrustacea
- Class: Insecta
- Order: Lepidoptera
- Family: Lycaenidae
- Genus: Chrysoritis
- Species: C. uranus

Binomial name
- Chrysoritis uranus (Pennington, 1962)

Synonyms
- Poecilmitis uranus Pennington, 1962; Poecilmitis uranus schoemani Heath, 1994

= Chrysoritis uranus =

Uranus opal

Species of butterfly

Chrysoritis uranus, the Uranus opal, is a lycaenid butterfly that is found only in South Africa.

The wingspan is 24–30 mm for males and 25–32 mm for females. Flight period has several broods from October to April.

The larvae feed on Centella, Aspalathus, and Zygophyllum species. They are attended to by Crematogaster liengmei ants.

== Subspecies ==
- Chrysoritis uranus uranus – South Africa: Western Cape
- Chrysoritis uranus schoemani (Heath, 1994) – South Africa: Western Cape
