= Dickson's copper =

Conservation status
- Critically Endangered (IUCN 3.1)

Scientific classification
- Kingdom: Animalia
- Phylum: Arthropoda
- Class: Insecta
- Order: Lepidoptera
- Family: Lycaenidae
- Genus: Chrysoritis
- Species: C. dicksoni

Binomial name
- Chrysoritis dicksoni (Gabriel, 1947)

Synonyms
- Phasis dicksoni Gabriel, 1947; Oxychaeta dicksoni (Gabriel, 1947)

Species of butterfly

Dickson's copper or Dickson's strandveld copper (Chrysoritis dicksoni) is a species of butterfly in the family Lycaenidae. It is endemic to South Africa, where it is only known inland from Witsand in a single spot in fynbos. Previously, it was also found north of Cape Town. It is sometimes separated in the monotypic genus Oxychaeta.

The wingspan is 26–35 mm for males and 33–40 mm for females. Adults are on wing from late July to mid-September. There is one generation per year.

The larvae feed through trophallaxis from Crematogaster peringueyi ants.
