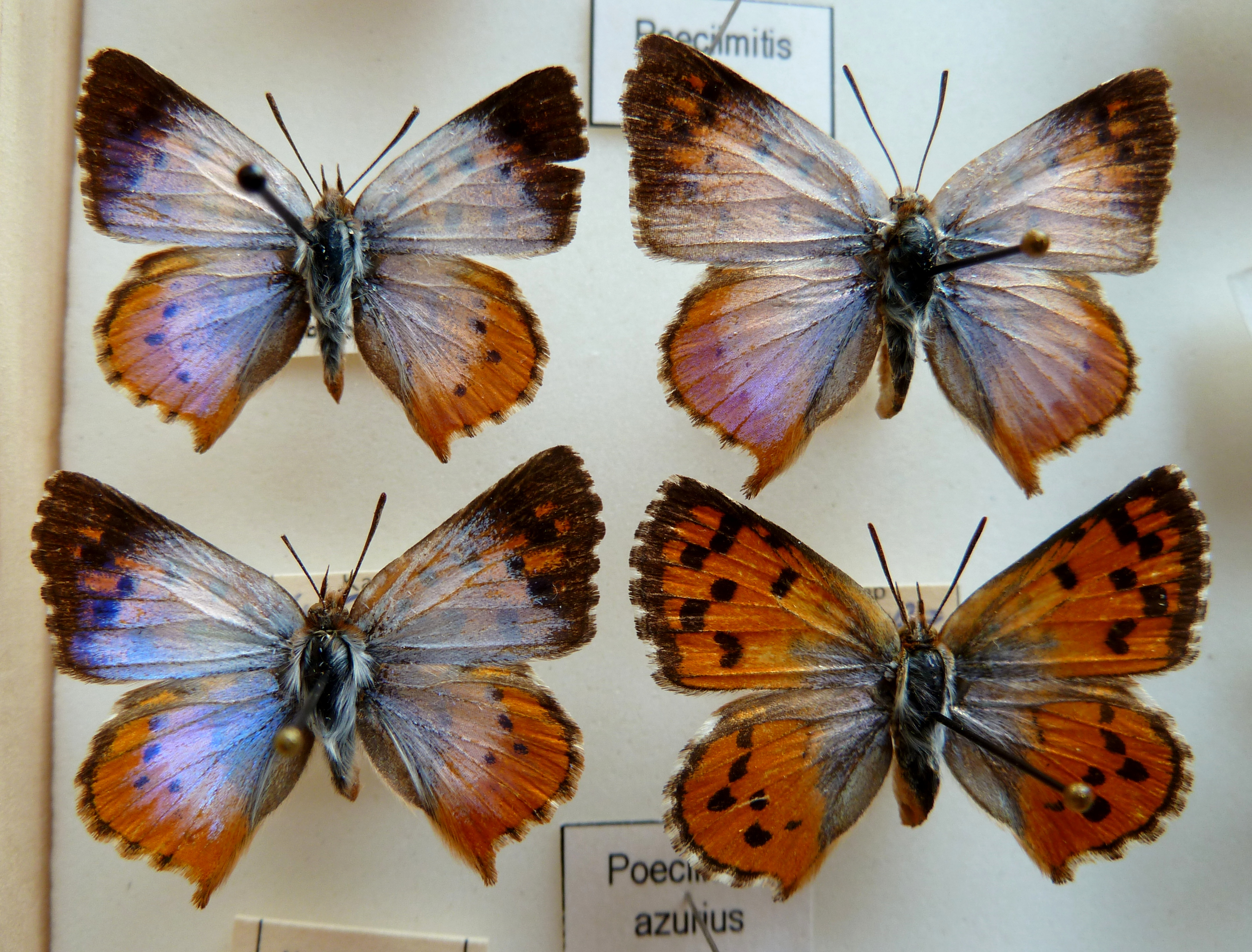

Conservation status
- Least Concern (IUCN 3.1)

Scientific classification
- Kingdom: Animalia
- Phylum: Arthropoda
- Clade: Pancrustacea
- Class: Insecta
- Order: Lepidoptera
- Family: Lycaenidae
- Genus: Chrysoritis
- Species: C. azurius

Binomial name
- Chrysoritis azurius (Swanepoel, 1975)

Synonyms
- Poecilmitis azurius Swanepoel, 1975

= Chrysoritis azurius =

Azure opal

Species of butterfly

Chrysoritis azurius, the azure opal, is a species of butterfly in the family Lycaenidae. It is endemic to South Africa, where it is known from the Northern Cape and Western Cape.

The wingspan is 32–36 mm for males and 35–40 mm for females. Adults are on wing from October to December. There is one extended generation per year.
