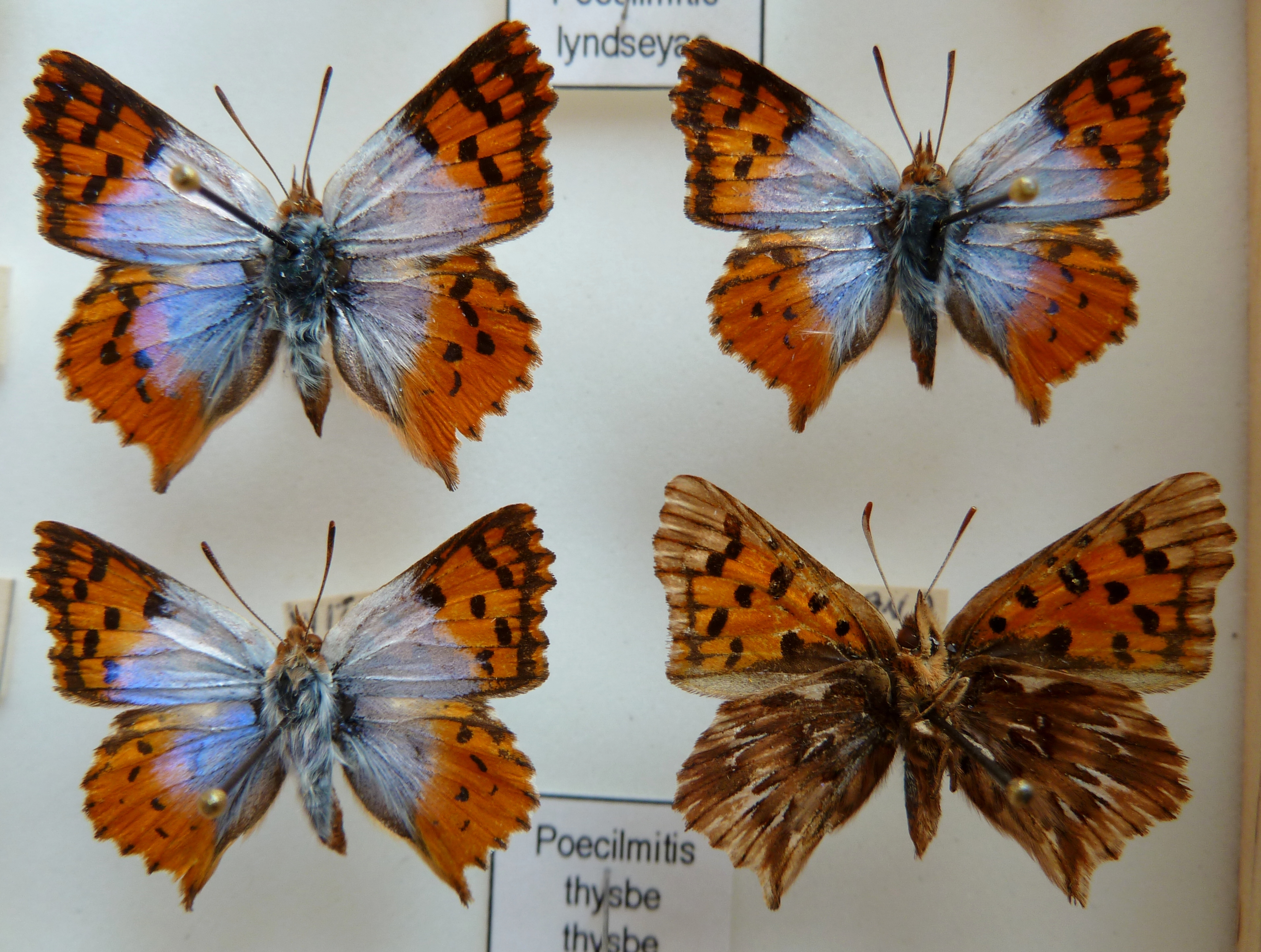

Scientific classification
- Kingdom: Animalia
- Phylum: Arthropoda
- Clade: Pancrustacea
- Class: Insecta
- Order: Lepidoptera
- Family: Lycaenidae
- Genus: Chrysoritis
- Species: C. thysbe

Binomial name
- Chrysoritis thysbe (Linnaeus, 1764)

Synonyms
- Papilio thysbe Linnaeus, 1764; Papilio nais Cramer, 1775; Papilio splendens Swainson, 1833; Phasis osbecki Aurivillius, 1882; Poecilmitis psyche Pennington, 1967; Poecilmitis bamptoni Dickson, 1976; Poecilmitis lyndseyae Henning, 1979; Poecilmitis thysbe schloszae Dickson, 1994; Poecilmitis whitei Dickson, 1994; Poecilmitis mithras Pringle, 1995

= Chrysoritis thysbe =

Opal copper

Species of butterfly

Chrysoritis thysbe, the opal copper or common opal, is a butterfly of the family Lycaenidae. It is found in South Africa.

== Description ==
The wingspan is 24–32 mm for males and 23–35 mm for females. Adults are on wing year-round with peaks in October and March.

== Life cycle ==
The larvae feed on Chrysanthemoides incana, C. monilifera, Osteospermum polygaloides, Lebeckia plukenetiana, Aspalathus, Zygophyllum and Thesium species.

The pupa of C. thysbe osbecki is found on the trunk of various plants like Tylecodon paniculatus, Roepera and Thesium species, all attended to by Crematogaster peringueyi ants, similar to C. thysbe psyche.

== Subspecies ==
- Chrysoritis thysbe (nominate subspecies)

Range: Cape Peninsula to Mossel Bay, north to Lamberts Bay, inland to Piketberg and Citrusdal

- Chrysoritis thysbe subsp. osbecki (Aurivillius, 1882)
- Chrysoritis thysbe subsp. psyche (Pennington, 1967)

Range: from Bitterfontein south to Nardouwsberg in the Western Cape

- Chrysoritis thysbe subsp. bamptoni (Dickson, 1976)

(This subspecies was formerly treated as the species Chrysoritis bamptoni)
Range: Hondeklipbaai area, inland to Wallekraal in the Northern Cape

- Chrysoritis thysbe subsp. schloszae (Dickson, 1994)

Range: Moorreesburg area in the Western Cape

- Chrysoritis thysbe subsp. whitei (Dickson, 1994)

Range: Port Elizabeth area in the Eastern Cape

- Chrysoritis thysbe subsp. mithras (Pringle, 1995)

Range: Stilbaai to Brenton-on-Sea in the Western Cape

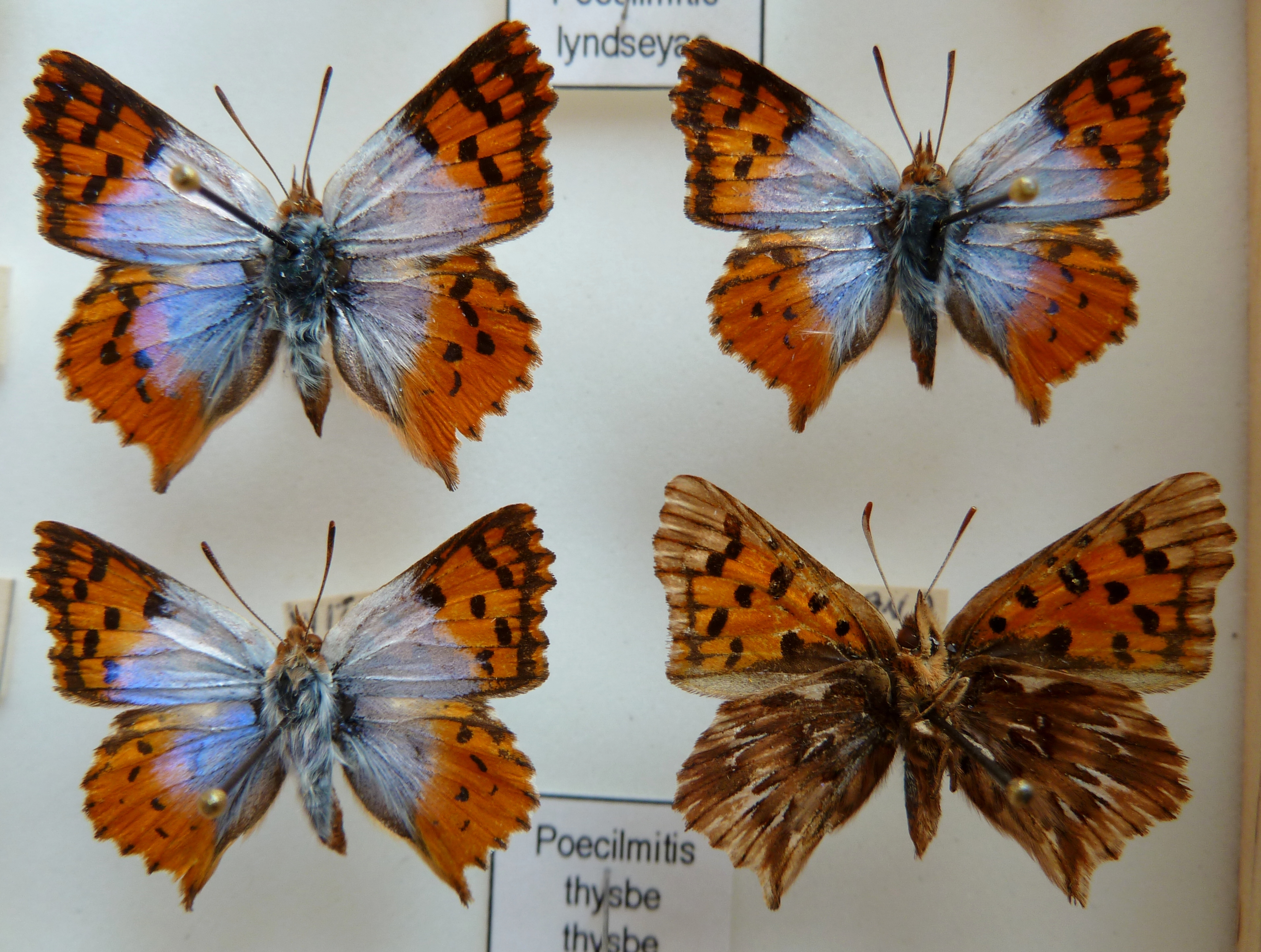
Nominate subsp.

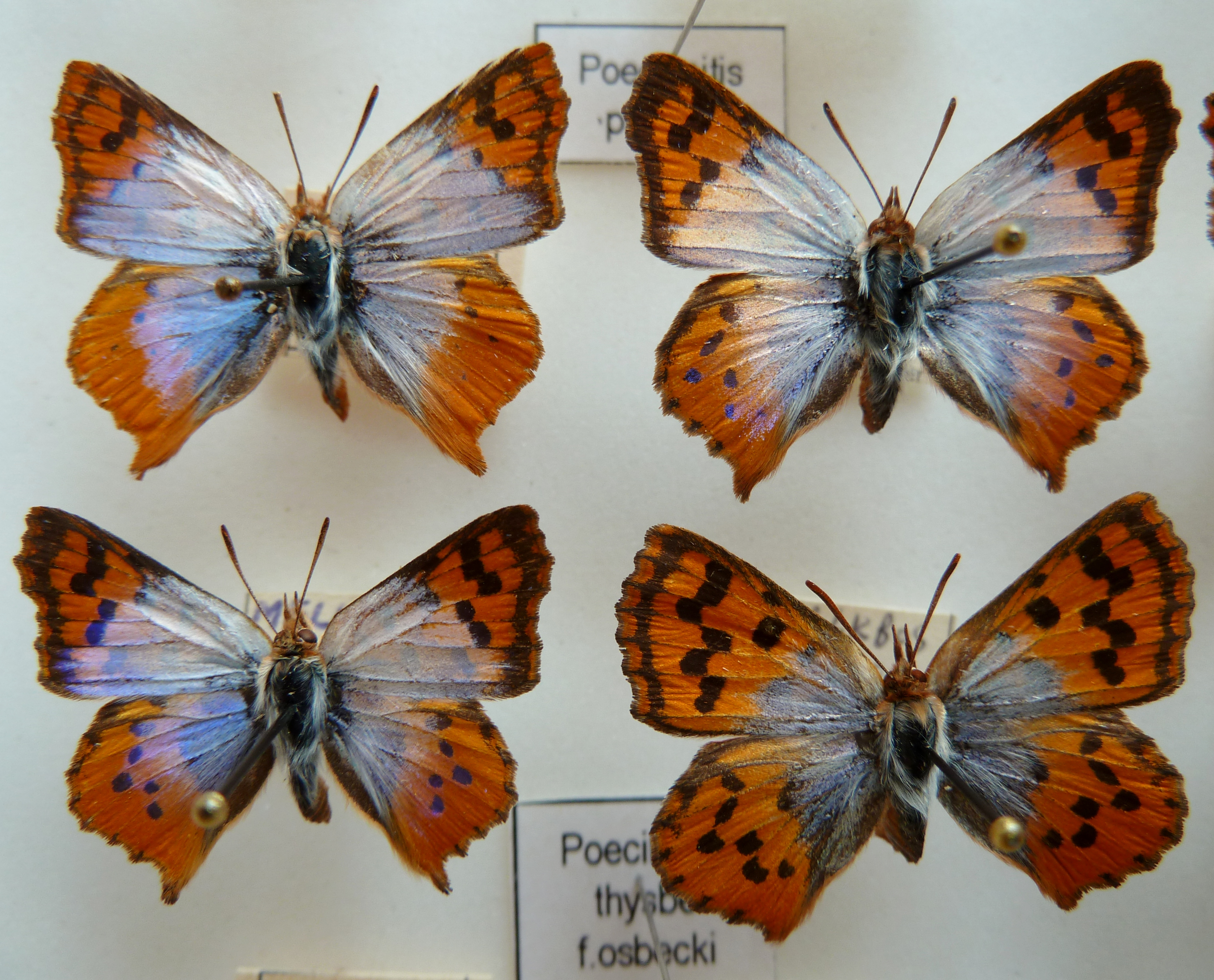
C. t. subsp. osbecki

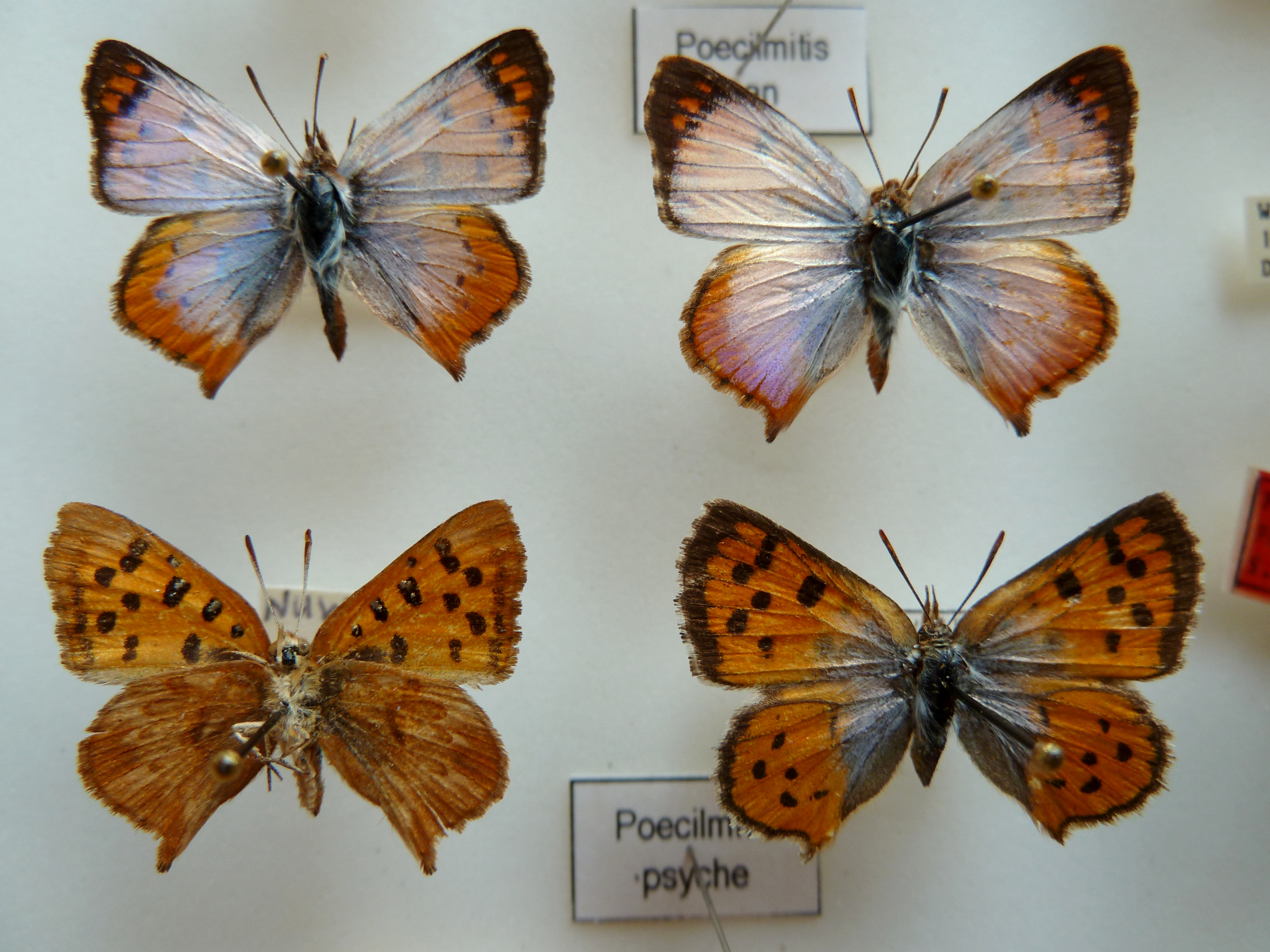
C. t. subsp. psyche

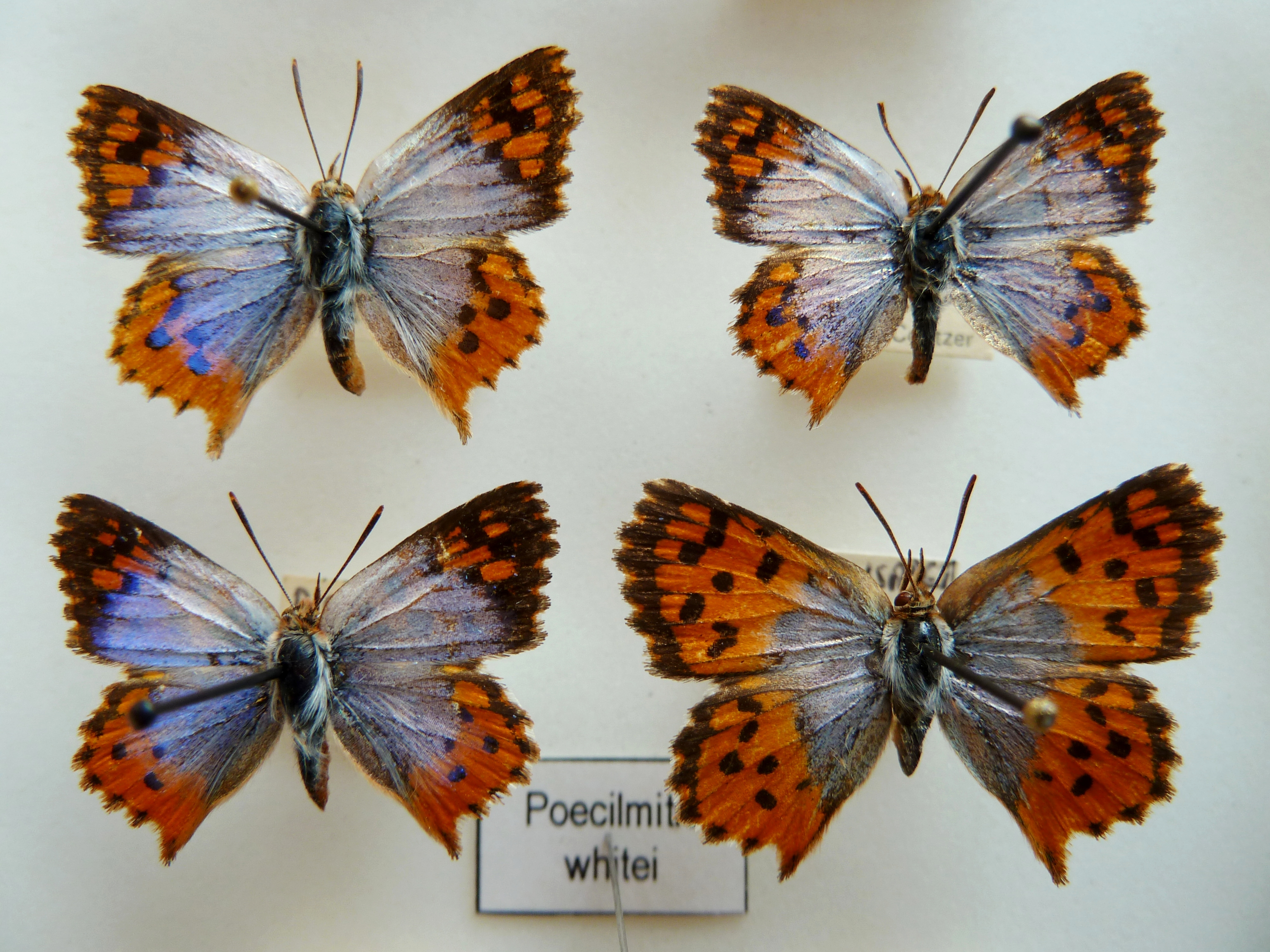
C. t. subsp. whitei

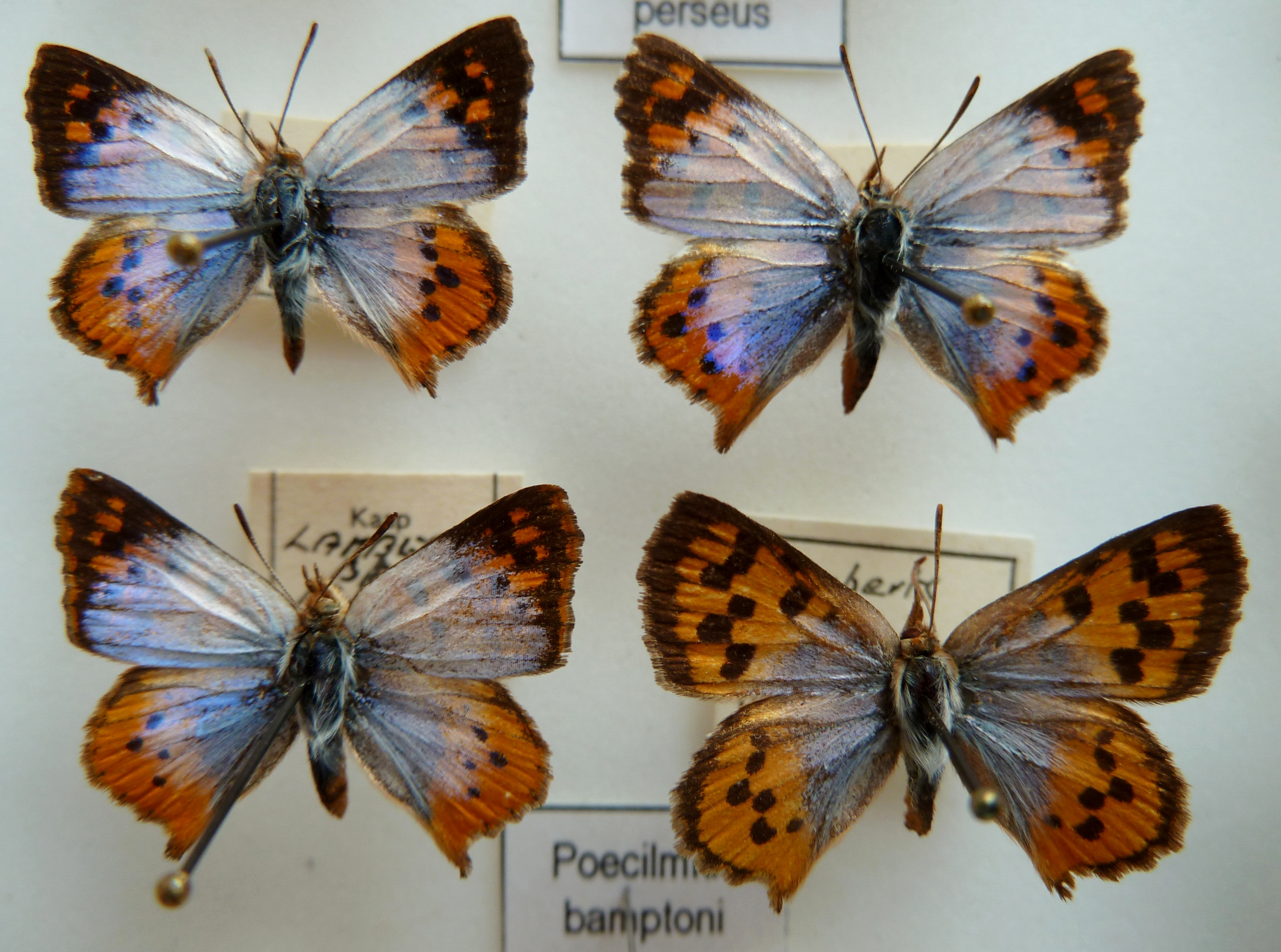
C. t. subsp. bamptoni
