= Chrysoritis aridus =

Conservation status
- Least Concern (IUCN 3.1)

Scientific classification
- Kingdom: Animalia
- Phylum: Arthropoda
- Clade: Pancrustacea
- Class: Insecta
- Order: Lepidoptera
- Family: Lycaenidae
- Genus: Chrysoritis
- Species: C. aridus

Binomial name
- Chrysoritis aridus (Pennington, 1953)

Synonyms
- Poecilmitis aridus Pennington, 1953

Species of butterfly

Chrysoritis aridus, the Namaqua opal, is a butterfly of the family Lycaenidae. It is found in South Africa, where it is found in Succulent Karoo in the Northern Cape.

The wingspan is 22–26 mm for males and 28–34 mm for females. Adults are on year from September to November. There is one generation per year.

The larvae feed on Chrysanthemoides incana and Zygophyllum species. The associated ant is unknown, but is suspected to be a Crematogaster species.
