= Chrysoritis natalensis =

Conservation status
- Least Concern (IUCN 2.3)

Scientific classification
- Kingdom: Animalia
- Phylum: Arthropoda
- Class: Insecta
- Order: Lepidoptera
- Family: Lycaenidae
- Genus: Chrysoritis
- Species: C. natalensis

Binomial name
- Chrysoritis natalensis (van Son, 1966)

Synonyms
- Poecilmitis natalensis van Son, 1966

Species of butterfly

Chrysoritis natalensis, the Natal opal, is a butterfly of the family Lycaenidae. It is found in South Africa, where it is found from the Eastern Cape, along the coast of KwaZulu-Natal and inland to Zululand and the midlands.

The wingspan is 24–30 mm for males and 28–34 mm for females. Adults are on wing year-round with peaks in November and February.

The larvae feed on Chrysanthemoides monilifera and Cotyledon orbiculata. They are associated with ants of the genus Crematogaster.
