= Chrysoritis endymion =

Endymion opal

Conservation status
- Least Concern (IUCN 3.1)

Scientific classification
- Kingdom: Animalia
- Phylum: Arthropoda
- Clade: Pancrustacea
- Class: Insecta
- Order: Lepidoptera
- Family: Lycaenidae
- Genus: Chrysoritis
- Species: C. endymion

Binomial name
- Chrysoritis endymion (Pennington, 1962)

Synonyms
- Poecilmitis endymion Pennington, 1962

Species of butterfly

Chrysoritis endymion, the Endymion opal, is a species of butterfly in the family Lycaenidae. It is endemic to South Africa.

The wingspan is 30–34 mm for males and 30–38 mm for females. Adults are on wing from November to January. There is one extended generation per year.
