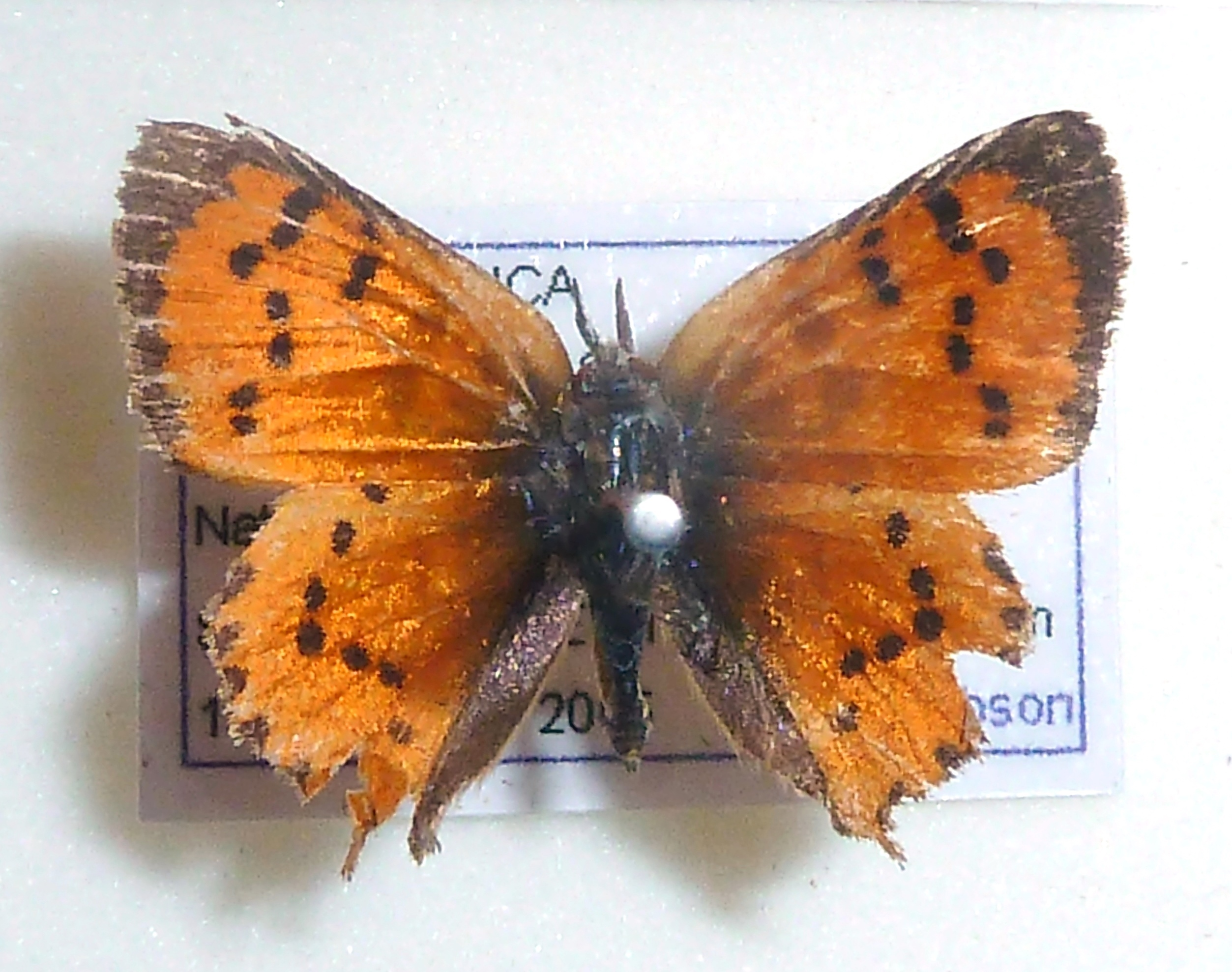

Scientific classification
- Kingdom: Animalia
- Phylum: Arthropoda
- Clade: Pancrustacea
- Class: Insecta
- Order: Lepidoptera
- Family: Lycaenidae
- Genus: Chrysoritis
- Species: C. chrysaor

Binomial name
- Chrysoritis chrysaor (Trimen, 1864)

Synonyms
- Zeritis chrysaor Trimen, 1864; Poecilmitis chrysaor; Poecilmitis lycia Riley, 1938

= Chrysoritis chrysaor =

Golden copper

Species of butterfly

Chrysoritis chrysaor, the golden copper or burnished opal, is a butterfly of the family Lycaenidae. It is found in South Africa, where it is widespread in the east.

The wingspan is 22–27 mm for males and 23–30 mm for females. Adults are on the wing year-round with peaks in November and February at high altitudes.

The larvae feed on Tylecodon paniculatus, Cotyledon orbiculata, Zygophyllum sessilifolium, Z. retrofractum, Acacia karroo and Rhus species. They are attended to by Crematogaster liengmei ants.
