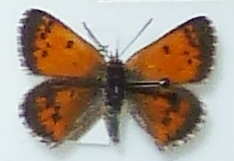

Conservation status
- Least Concern (IUCN 3.1)

Scientific classification
- Kingdom: Animalia
- Phylum: Arthropoda
- Clade: Pancrustacea
- Class: Insecta
- Order: Lepidoptera
- Family: Lycaenidae
- Genus: Chrysoritis
- Species: C. oreas

Binomial name
- Chrysoritis oreas (Trimen, 1891)

Synonyms
- Zeritis oreas Trimen, 1891

= Chrysoritis oreas =

Drakensberg copper

Species of butterfly

Chrysoritis oreas, the Drakensberg copper or Drakensberg daisy copper, is a species of butterfly in the family Lycaenidae. It is endemic to South Africa, where it is found in montane grassland in the eastern KwaZulu-Natal Drakensberg foothills.

The wingspan is 21–23 mm for males and 22–24 mm for females. Adults are on wing from late September to mid-November. There is one generation per year.

The larvae feed on Thesium species. They are attended to by Myrmicaria nigra ants.
