= Chrysoritis aethon =

Lydenburg opal

Conservation status
- Least Concern (IUCN 3.1)

Scientific classification
- Kingdom: Animalia
- Phylum: Arthropoda
- Class: Insecta
- Order: Lepidoptera
- Family: Lycaenidae
- Genus: Chrysoritis
- Species: C. aethon

Binomial name
- Chrysoritis aethon (Trimen, 1887)

Synonyms
- Zeritis aethon Trimen, 1887; Poecilimitis aethon

Species of butterfly

Chrysoritis aethon, the Lydenburg opal, is a butterfly of the family Lycaenidae. It is found in South Africa, where it is known from northern KwaZulu-Natal to Mpumalanga, along the Drakensberg escarpment to Mariepskop in Limpopo.

The wingspan is 24–28 mm for males and 28–32 mm for females. Adults are on wing from September to April, with peaks in November and February. There are several generations per year.

The larvae feed on Rhus zeyheri and Diospyros species. They are attended to by Crematogaster liengmei ants.
