= Chrysoritis pelion =

Machacha opal

Conservation status
- Least Concern (IUCN 3.1)

Scientific classification
- Kingdom: Animalia
- Phylum: Arthropoda
- Clade: Pancrustacea
- Class: Insecta
- Order: Lepidoptera
- Family: Lycaenidae
- Genus: Chrysoritis
- Species: C. pelion

Binomial name
- Chrysoritis pelion (Pennington, 1953)

Synonyms
- Poecilmitis pelion Pennington, 1953

Species of butterfly

Chrysoritis pelion, the Machacha opal, is a butterfly of the family Lycaenidae found only in South Africa. Terblanche and van Hamburg state "due to their intricate life histories and the unique wing patterns and colouring the butterflies of the genus Chrysoritis are of significant conservation and aesthetic value".

The wingspan is 20–24 mm for males and 22–30 mm for females. Flight period has several broods from October to March.
