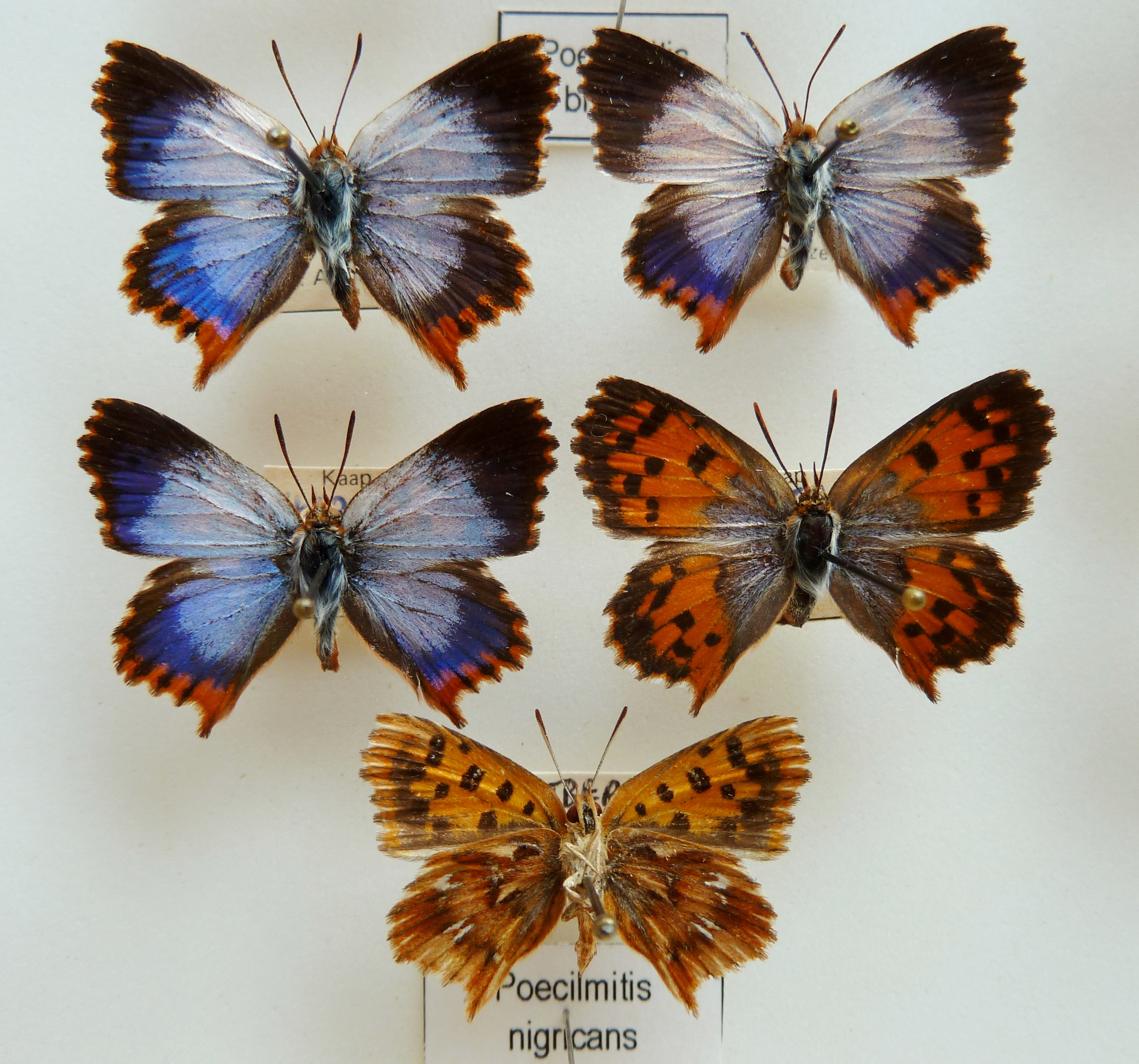
- Set of C. n. zwartbergae

Scientific classification
- Kingdom: Animalia
- Phylum: Arthropoda
- Clade: Pancrustacea
- Class: Insecta
- Order: Lepidoptera
- Family: Lycaenidae
- Genus: Chrysoritis
- Species: C. nigricans

Binomial name
- Chrysoritis nigricans (Aurivillius, 1924)

Synonyms
- Phasis thysbe var. nigricans Aurivillius, 1924; Poecilmitis nigricans; Poecilmitis nigricans zwartbergae Dickson, 1982; Poecilmitis nigricans rubrescens

= Chrysoritis nigricans =

Dark opal

Species of butterfly

Chrysoritis nigricans, the dark opal, is a butterfly of the family Lycaenidae found only in South Africa.

The wingspan is 22–33 mm for males and 23–38 mm for females. Flight period is multi-brooded from September to April, peaking October/November and March.

Larvae feed on Thesium species, Osteospermum polygaloides, and Zygophyllum species. They are associated with ants of the genus Crematogaster.

== Subspecies ==
- Chrysoritis nigricans nigricans (South Africa: Western Cape province)
- Chrysoritis nigricans zwartbergae (Dickson, 1982) (South Africa: Western Cape province)
- Chrysoritis nigricans rubrescens Heath & Pringle, 2007 (South Africa: Western Cape province)
