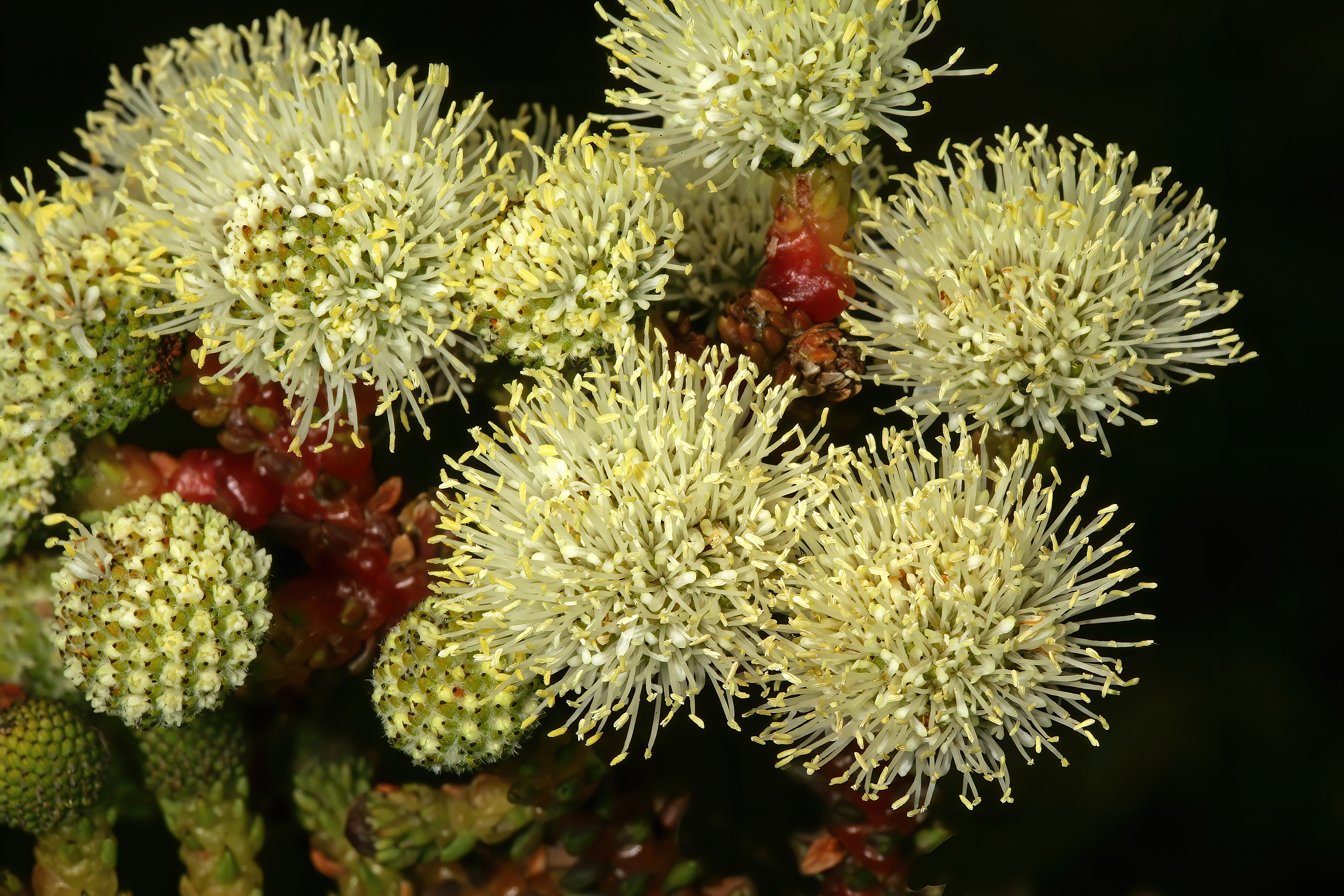

Scientific classification
- Kingdom: Plantae
- Clade: Tracheophytes
- Clade: Angiosperms
- Clade: Eudicots
- Clade: Asterids
- Order: Bruniales
- Family: Bruniaceae
- Genus: Berzelia
- Species: B. abrotanoides

Binomial name
- Berzelia abrotanoides (L.) Brongn.

= Berzelia abrotanoides =

Species of flowering plant

Berzelia abrotanoides, commonly known as redlegs, is a species of flowering plant in the family Bruniaceae native to the Western Cape region of South Africa. The foliage and dried flower heads are used in the cut flower industry.
