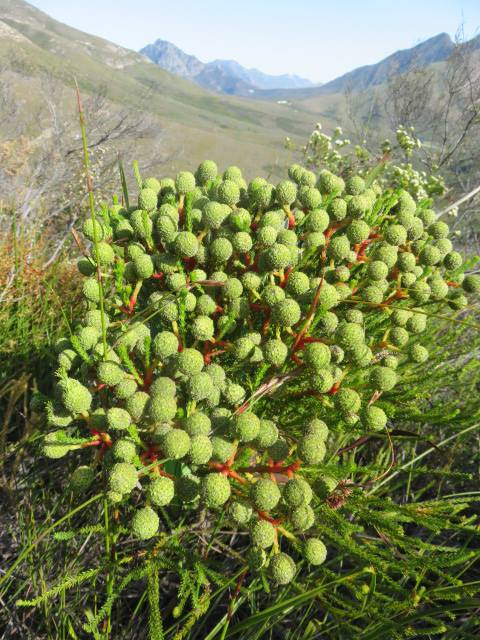

Scientific classification
- Kingdom: Plantae
- Clade: Tracheophytes
- Clade: Angiosperms
- Clade: Eudicots
- Clade: Asterids
- Order: Bruniales
- Family: Bruniaceae
- Genus: Berzelia
- Species: B. intermedia

Binomial name
- Berzelia intermedia Schltdl. (1831)

Synonyms
- Berzelia ericoides Eckl. & Zeyh.; Berzelia wendlandiana Eckl. & Zeyh.; Brunia intermedia D.Dietr.; Brunia paleacea J.C.Wendl.

= Berzelia intermedia =

Species of flowering plant

Berzelia intermedia is a shrub that belongs to the Bruniaceae family. The species is endemic to the Western Cape and is part of the fynbos. The plant is also known as knopbos, buttonbos, and kolkolbos.
