= Norman Denbigh Riley =

British entomologist

Norman Denbigh Riley CBE (26 September 1890 London – 26 May 1979) was a British entomologist with a special interest in the Lepidoptera, and in particular the Lycaenidae. For many years he was keeper of entomology at the British Museum.

His first schooling took place at Dulwich College where his interest in natural history and Lepidoptera became evident. Richard South, the prominent entomologist was the Riley family's neighbour in Balham and encouraged Norman Riley in his hobby. After he finishing school Riley enrolled at the Imperial College in order to take a course in entomology, and managed to find work there as a demonstrator under Ray Lankester, who was then director of the British Museum. At age 21 he was appointed as an assistant in the Entomology Department.

With the outbreak of World War I in 1914, Riley joined the Royal Army Service Corps, and saw service in France. At the end of the war he was discharged with the rank of captain and resumed his work at the museum, becoming keeper of entomology in 1932. He became dedicated to acquiring gifts and purchases of specimens to expand the collection of the museum, and succeeded in creating a research resource of international renown.

Because of his easy and affable manner, Riley became popular as a committee-man and competently steered projects through financial and political pitfalls, becoming involved in national and international entomological matters. He served as both secretary and treasurer to the Entomological Society of London between 1926 and 1951, and was elected president in 1952. He was also a charter member of the Lepidopterists' Society and served on their council, being elected vice-president in 1954 and president in 1958. He also found time to be active in the Zoological Society of London. In 1922, on the retirement of Richard South, his boyhood mentor, Riley took over the running of a small, but popular periodical called The Entomologist.

== Works ==
- 1944 Some British Moths – Norman Denbigh Riley
- 1964 The Department of Entomology of the British Museum, 1904-1964 – Norman Denbigh Riley
- 1970 Butterflies and Moths – Alfred Werner, Josef Bijok edited by Norman Denbigh Riley, New York Studio/The Viking Press
- 1975 A Field Guide to the Butterflies of the West Indies – Norman D. Riley, Quadrangle Publishers ISBN 0812905547
- 1970 A Field Guide to the Butterflies of Britain and Europe – Lionel George Higgins, Norman Denbigh Riley
