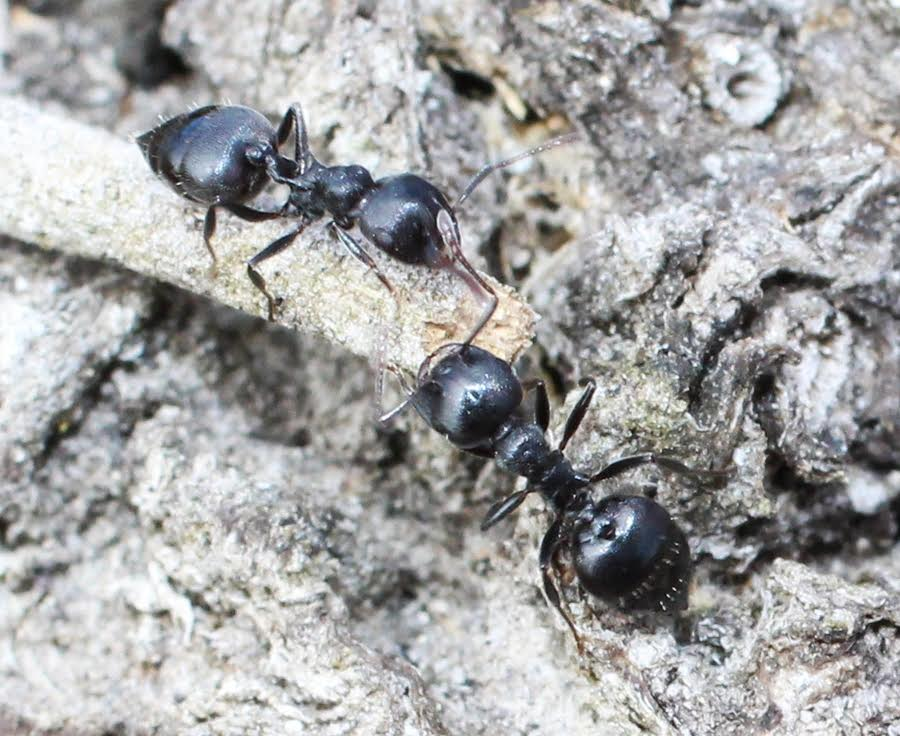

Scientific classification
- Kingdom: Animalia
- Phylum: Arthropoda
- Clade: Pancrustacea
- Class: Insecta
- Order: Hymenoptera
- Family: Formicidae
- Subfamily: Myrmicinae
- Genus: Crematogaster
- Species: C. peringueyi

Binomial name
- Crematogaster peringueyi Emery, 1895

= Crematogaster peringueyi =

Black cocktail ant

Species of ant

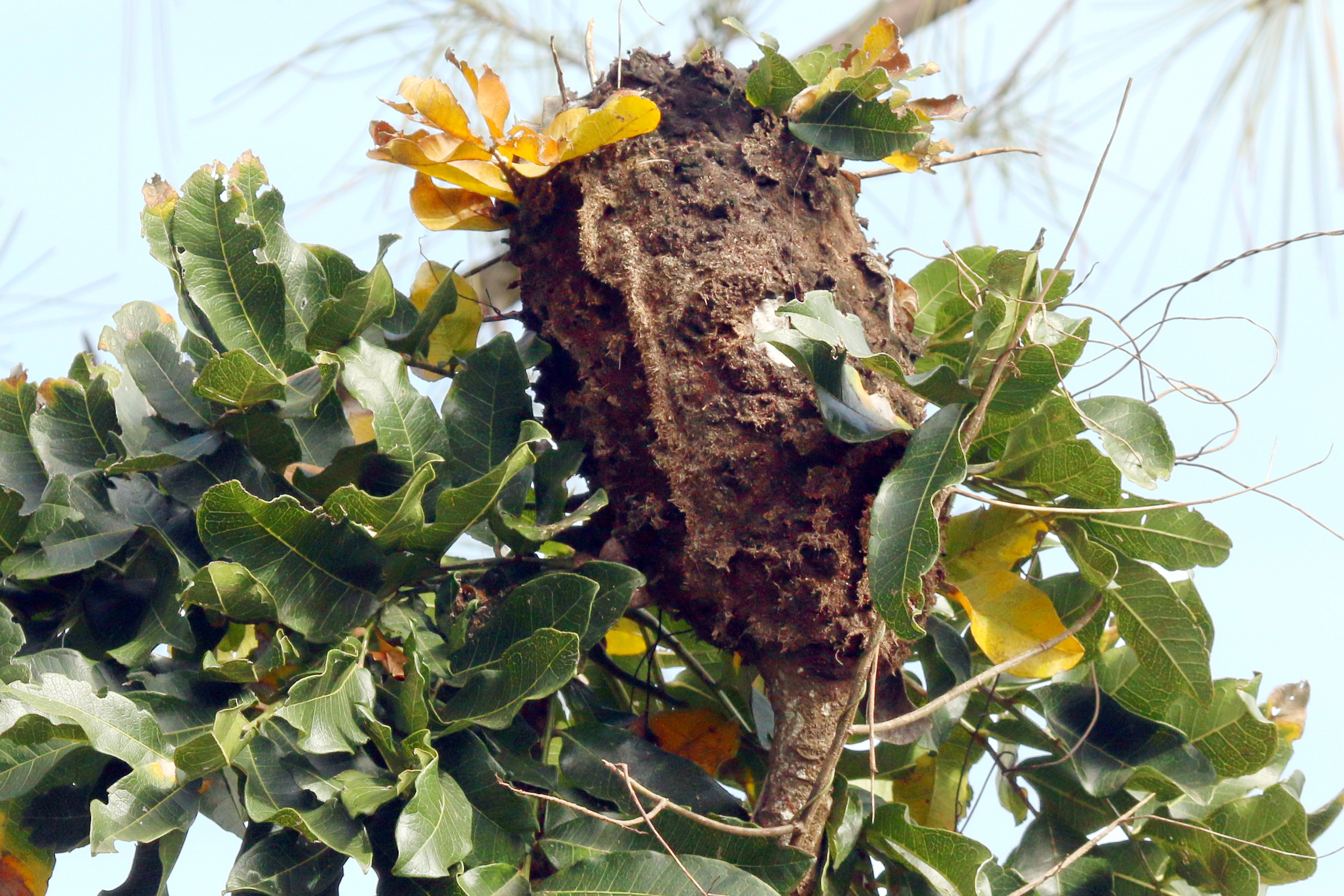
Carton nest Kwa-Zulu Natal, South Africa

Clockwise from top left: Worker, queen, alarmed worker, nest, pupa, larva, eggs

Crematogaster peringueyi is a southern African arboreal species of ant. They are commonly known as the black cocktail ant or swartwipgatmier (Afrikaans) for their colour and habit of arching their abdomens when alarmed.

== Habits ==
They make their nests in old Protea flowers, dead, hollow branches, and under tree bark, also making nests constructed of well-chewed vegetable matter with the consistency of papier-mâché. The outer walls of these nests are blackened by the salivary secretions, and are thin, with the interior divided into irregular, connected cells, like a coarse sponge. These more or less spherical nests, ranging in diameter from 10–30 cm, are built in a fork or among the branches, some of the branches passing through the nest. Workers are glossy black and 3–5 mm long, and the larger queen is about eight mm long, both having heart-shaped abdomens.

== Defense ==
Pheromone alarms are common among the social Hymenoptera. Some of these have been chemically identified, but the number is still small compared with the large number of species making use of them. The ketone octan-3-one is seen as the major component of the pheromone complex secreted from the heads of C. peringueyi.

The sting or venom gland of other ant species has evolved in C. peringueyi into a gland secreting a smelly and irritant fluid, which, together with the ant's painful bite, is a strong deterrent to predation or attack.

== Symbiosis ==
Butterflies belonging to the family Lycaenidae, like the Common Opal (Chrysoritis thysbe), Dickson's Copper (Chrysoritis dicksoni) and other members of this genus, have a mutualistic relationship with various species of Crematogaster. The Lycaenidae and Crematogaster spp. are strongly associated with the fynbos growing in the Natal Drakensberg, and on Table Mountain Sandstone in the western and southern Cape. C. peringueyi also occurs at Jagersfontein, De Aar, Willowmore, Clanwilliam, Garies, Springbok, and Laingsburg.

Various honeydew-producing insects such as aphids, scale insects and mealybugs are diligently protected by the ants. Common Opal larvae also produce honeydew from a gland on the back, leading to their being constantly guarded from predators such as parasitic wasps. The larvae at first feed and rest among the young leaves of the foodplant, but with the 3rd instar move to the plant's base. Here the ants extend their protection and hospitality by constructing papery daytime shelters for the larvae which feed by night on plants such as Bietou, and species of Aspalathus, Osteospermum and Zygophyllum. The larvae use these same shelters for pupating, the pupae also producing honeydew to ensure ant protection.

== Interactions with humans ==
Crematogaster peringueyi – and other ants with a similar location and lifestyle, Linepithema humile and Formica perpilosa – are indirect pests of South African viticulture. Addison & Samways 2000 and Mgocheki & Addison 2009 find that these ants interfere with the natural biological control of Planococcus ficus provided by various natural enemies. The ants and the mealybug have a pre-existing mutualistic (honeydew) relationship and so provide them with a refuge. In their next work Mgocheki & Addison 2010 find that managing the ants did indeed lead to increased parasitism on the mealybug and decreased crop injury.

== General ==
The genus of Crematogaster, created by Peter Wilhelm Lund in 1831 (Lettre sur les habitudes de quelques fourmis du Brésil, adressée a M. Audouin. Annales des Sciences Naturelles 23: 113-138) is diverse, widespread and abundant, distributed over tropical, subtropical and warm-temperate regions throughout the world. Greek: 'kremastos' + 'gaster' = 'suspended stomach', which would make the literal generic spelling 'Cremastogaster', but Lund set it as 'Crematogaster', which is preserved by priority.

The whistling thorn of East Africa is fiercely protected by at least three species of Crematogaster which occupy the swollen thorns and, in exchange for nectar from the tree, vigorously attack browsers.

Trail-laying amongst cocktail ants involves shuffling their hind legs without touching of the soil with their abdomens, as is common with other ant species. This results in a setting of footprints for other foragers to follow. The hind leg's tendon to the claw is swollen where it passes through the tibia into a spindle-shaped reservoir containing the pheromone, an oil-like, relatively nonvolatile substance.

== Synonyms ==
- Cremastogaster peringueyi Emery

== Publications ==
- Emery, C. 1895i. Voyage de M. E. Simon dans l'Afrique australe (janvier-avril 1893). 3e mémoire. Formicides. Ann. Soc. Entomol. Fr. 64: 15-56 (page 27, figs. 16, 17 worker, queen, male described)
- Emery, C. 1922c. Hymenoptera. Fam. Formicidae. Subfam. Myrmicinae. [part]. Genera Insectorum 174B: 95-206 (page 148, Combination in C. (Acrocoelia))
- Crewe, R.M., Brand, J.M., and Fletcher, D.J.C. 1969. Identification of an alarm pheromone in the ant Crematogaster peringueyi. Ann. Entomol. Soc. Am. 62:1212.
