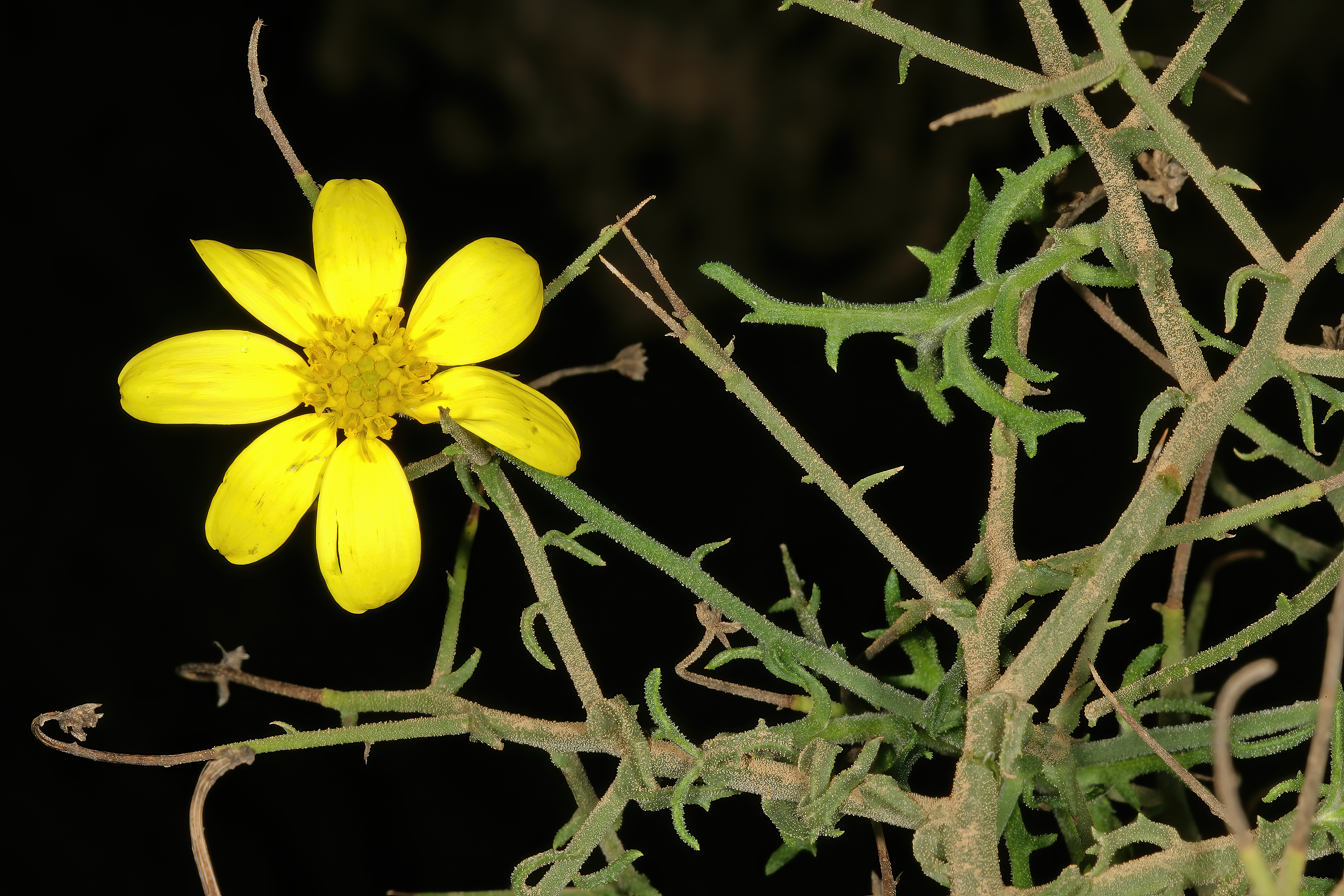
- Osteospermum spinosum

Scientific classification
- Kingdom: Plantae
- Clade: Tracheophytes
- Clade: Angiosperms
- Clade: Eudicots
- Clade: Asterids
- Order: Asterales
- Family: Asteraceae
- Subfamily: Asteroideae
- Tribe: Calenduleae
- Genus: Osteospermum; L.

Type species
- Osteospermum spinosum (L.)

Species
- See text

Synonyms
- Chrysanthemoides Fabr. (1759); Eriocline Cass. (1819); Inuloides B.Nord. (2006); Lepisiphon Turcz. (1851); Monilifera Adans. (1763), nom. superfl.; Monoculus B.Nord. (2006); Nephrotheca B.Nord. & Källersjö (2006); Norlindhia B.Nord. (2006); Oligocarpus Less. (1832); Tripterachaenium Kuntze (1898); Tripteris Less. (1831); Xenismia DC. (1836)

= Osteospermum =

Genus of plants

Osteospermum /ˌɒstiəˈspɜːrməm, -tioʊ-/, is a genus of flowering plants belonging to the Calenduleae, one of the smaller tribes of the sunflower/daisy family Asteraceae. They are known as the daisybushes or African daisies. Its species have been given several common names, including African daisy, South African daisy, Cape daisy and blue-eyed daisy. The name Cape daisy is also applied to Dimorphotheca pluvialis.

In horticulture, several widely cultivated species continue to be sold, grown and referred to as Osteospermum, however some of these species have been scientifically reclassified as being members of the genus Dimorphotheca, including Dimorphotheca barberae (synonym Osteospermum barberae); Dimorphotheca ecklonis (synonym Osteospermum ecklonis), Dimorphotheca fruticosa (synonym Osteospermum fruticosum); and Dimorphotheca jucunda (synonym Osteospermum jucundum).

== Description ==
Their alternate (rarely opposite) leaves are green, but some variegated forms exist. The leaf form is lanceolate. The leaf margin is entire, but hardy types are toothed.

The daisy-like composite flower consists of disc florets and ray florets, growing singly at the end of branches or sometimes in inflorescences of terminal corymbose cymes. The disc florets are pseudo-bisexual and come in several colors such as blue, yellow and purple. The hardy types usually show a dark blue center in the disc until the yellow pollen is shed. The ray florets are female and are found in diverse colors such as white, cream, pink, purple, mauve, and yellow. Some cultivars have "spooned" petals such as "Pink Whirls". Many species flower a second time late summer, stimulated by the cooler night temperatures. Hardy types show profuse flowering in the spring, but they do not get a second flush of flowers.

== Taxonomy ==
The genus Osteospermum was named by Carl Linnaeus in 1753. The genus name is derived from Ancient Greek ὀστέον (ostéon), meaning "bone", and σπέρμα (spérma), meaning "seed". Plants of the World Online and the South African National Biodiversity Institute accept a broad definition of the genus, which is a sister taxon to Dimorphotheca. Other authorities treat its generic synonyms (Chrysanthemoides, Oligocarpus, etc.) as separate genera.

== Species ==
74 species are accepted:

- Osteospermum acanthospermum (DC.) Norl.
- Osteospermum aciphyllum DC.
- Osteospermum afromontanum Norl.
- Osteospermum amplectens (Harv.) Norl.
- Osteospermum angolense Norl.
- Osteospermum apterum (B.Nord.) J.C.Manning & Goldblatt
- Osteospermum armatum Norl.
- Osteospermum asperulum (DC.) Norl.
- Osteospermum attenuatum Hilliard & B.L.Burtt
- Osteospermum auriculatum (S.Moore) Norl.
- Osteospermum australe B.Nord.
- Osteospermum bidens Thunb.
- Osteospermum bolusii (Compton) Norl.
- Osteospermum breviradiatum Norl. — Lemoenboegoe
- Osteospermum burttianum B.Nord.
- Osteospermum calcicola (J.C.Manning & Goldblatt) J.C.Manning & Goldblatt
- Osteospermum calendulaceum L.f. — Stinking Roger
- Osteospermum ciliatum P.J.Bergius
- Osteospermum connatum DC.
- Osteospermum corymbosum L.
- Osteospermum crassifolium (O.Hoffm.) Norl.
- Osteospermum dentatum Burm.f.
- Osteospermum elsieae Norl.
- Osteospermum grandidentatum DC. — Yellow trailing daisy
- Osteospermum grandiflorum DC.
- Osteospermum hafstroemii Norl.
- Osteospermum herbaceum L.f.
- Osteospermum hirsutum Thunb.
- Osteospermum hispidum Harv.
- Osteospermum hyoseroides (DC.) Norl.
- Osteospermum ilicifolium L.
- Osteospermum imbricatum L.
- Osteospermum incanum Burm.f.
- Osteospermum junceum P.J.Bergius
- Osteospermum karrooicum (Bolus) Norl.
- Osteospermum lanceolatum DC.
- Osteospermum leptolobum (Harv.) Norl.
- Osteospermum microcarpum (Harv.) Norl.
- Osteospermum microphyllum DC.
- Osteospermum moniliferum L.
- Osteospermum monocephalum (Oliv. & Hiern) Norl.
- Osteospermum monstrosum (Burm.f.) J.C.Manning & Goldblatt
- Osteospermum montanum Klatt
- Osteospermum muricatum E.Mey. ex DC.
- Osteospermum namibense Swanepoel
- Osteospermum nervosum (Hutch.) Norl.
- Osteospermum nordenstamii J.C.Manning & Goldblatt
- Osteospermum norlindhianum J.C.Manning & Goldblatt
- Osteospermum nyikense Norl.
- Osteospermum oppositifolium (Aiton) Norl.
- Osteospermum pinnatilobatum Norl.
- Osteospermum pinnatum (Thunb.) Norl.
- Osteospermum polycephalum (DC.) Norl.
- Osteospermum polygaloides L.
- Osteospermum potbergense A.R.Wood & B.Nord.
- Osteospermum pterigoideum Klatt
- Osteospermum pyrifolium Norl.
- Osteospermum rigidum Aiton
- Osteospermum rosulatum Norl.
- Osteospermum rotundifolium (DC.) Norl.
- Osteospermum sanctae-helenae Norl.
- Osteospermum scariosum DC.
- Osteospermum sinuatum (DC.) Norl.
- Osteospermum spathulatum (DC.) Norl.
- Osteospermum spinescens Thunb.
- Osteospermum spinigerum (Norl.) Norl.
- Osteospermum spinosum L.
- Osteospermum striatum Burtt Davy
- Osteospermum subulatum DC.
- Osteospermum thodei Markötter
- Osteospermum tomentosum (L.f.) B.Nord.
- Osteospermum triquetrum L.f.
- Osteospermum vaillantii (Decne.) Norl.
- Osteospermum volkensii (O.Hoffm.) Norl.

=== Formerly placed here ===
- Dimorphotheca barberae — synonym Osteospermum barberae (Harv.) Norl.)
- Dimorphotheca ecklonis — Cape marguerite, blue-and-white daisybush (synonym Osteospermum ecklonis (DC.) Norl.)
- Dimorphotheca fruticosa — Trailing African daisy, shrubby daisybush (synonym Osteospermum fruticosum (L.) Norl.)
- Dimorphotheca jucunda (E.Phillips) Norl. — South African daisy (synonym Osteospermum jucundum E.Phillips)

== Distribution ==
There are about 70 species native to southern and eastern Africa and the Arabian peninsula.

== Cultivation ==
Osteospermum are popular in cultivation, where they are frequently used in summer bedding schemes in parks and gardens. Numerous hybrids and cultivars have been grown with a wide range of tropical colors. Yellow cultivars tend to have a yellow center (sometimes off-white).

Plants prefer a warm and sunny position and rich soil, although they tolerate poor soil, salt or drought well. Modern cultivars flower continuously when watered and fertilised well, and dead-heading is not necessary, because they do not set seed easily. If planted in a container, soil should be prevented from drying out completely. If they do, the plants will go into "sleep mode" and survive the period of drought, but they will abort their flower buds and not easily come back into flower. Moreover, roots are relatively susceptible to rotting if watered too profusely after the dry period.

=== Cultivars ===
Most widely sold cultivars are grown as annuals, are mainly hybrids of O. jucundum, O. ecklonis and O. grandiflorum and can be hardy to -2 °C (30 °F). If hardy, they can be grown as perennials or as shrubs.

Cultivars (those marked agm have gained the Royal Horticultural Society's Award of Garden Merit):

'White Spoon'

- 'Acapulco'
- 'African Queen'
- 'Apricot'
- 'Biera'
- 'Big Pink'
- 'Blackthorn Seedling' agm
- 'Bodegas Pink'
- 'Buttermilk' agm
- 'Chris Brickell'
- 'Duet'
- 'Giles Gilbey'
- 'Hopleys' agm
- 'Ice White'
- 'Langtrees agm
- 'Lady Leitrim' agm
- 'Lilac Spoon'
- 'Marbella'
- 'Merriments Joy'
- 'Nairobi Purple'
- O. jucundum agm
- 'Passion Mix'
- 'Pink'
- 'Pink Beauty'
- 'Pink Whirls' agm
- 'Silver Sparkler' agm
- 'Soprano'
- 'Starshine'
- 'Springstar Gemma'
- 'Sunkist'
- 'Weetwood'
- 'White Pim' agm
- 'White Spoon'
- 'White Whirls'
- 'Whirlygig'

== Image gallery ==
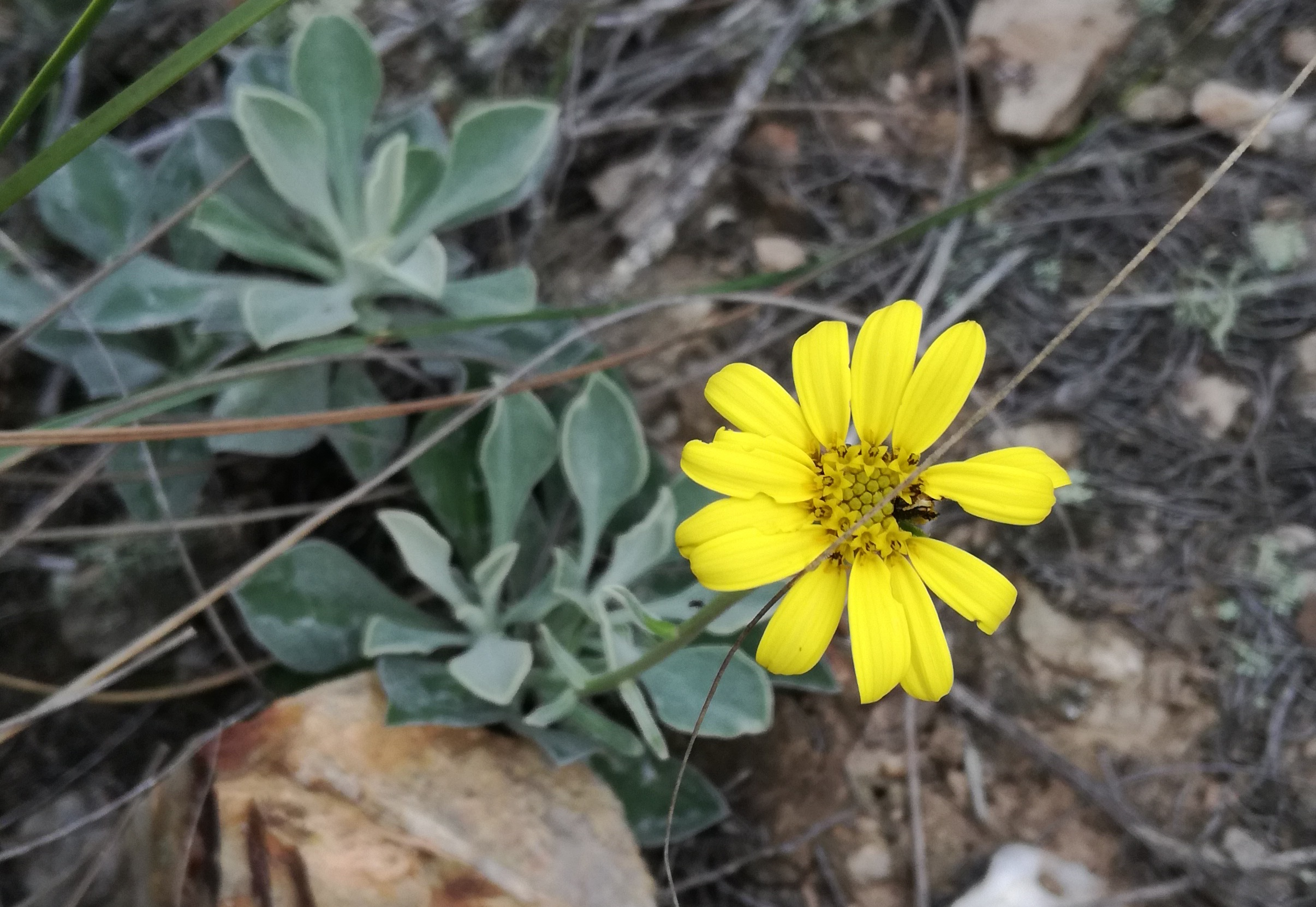
Osteospermum tomentosum

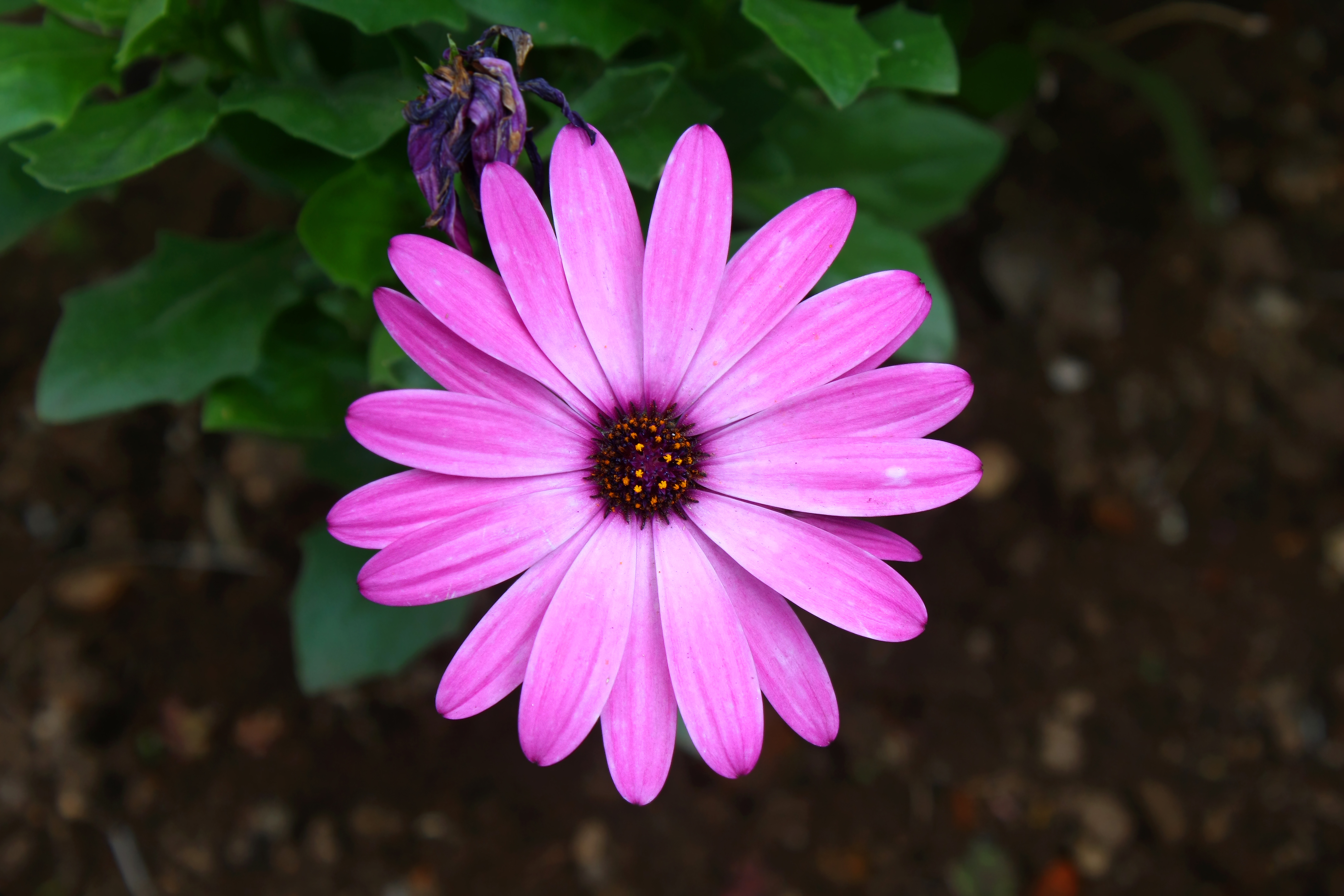
'Passion Mix'

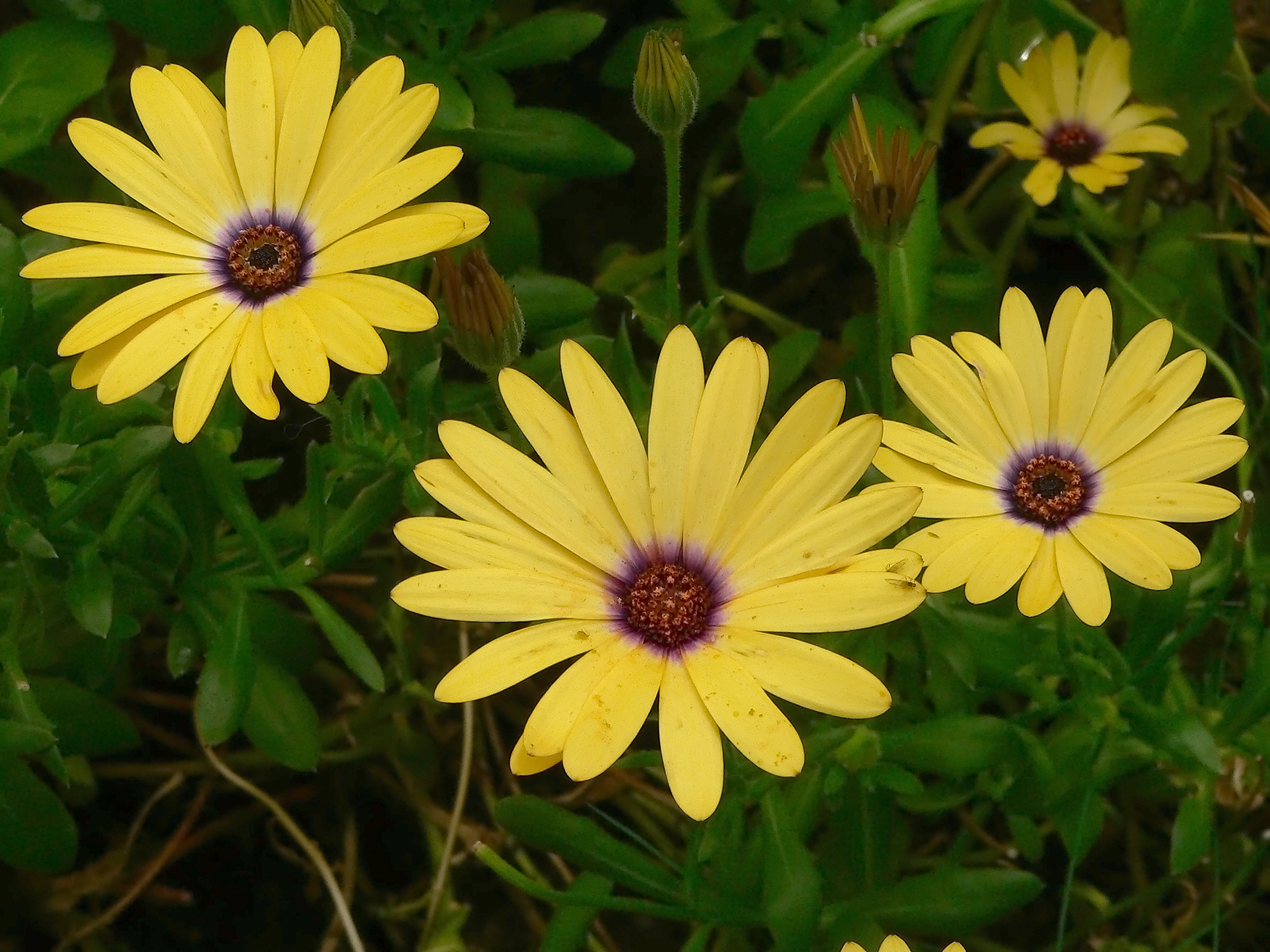
'Lemon Symphony' (an annual cultivar)

Osteospermum 'Sunadora Hotspots Marbella', a modern hybrid

Osteospermum 'Sunadora Hotspots Acapulco', another modern hybrid

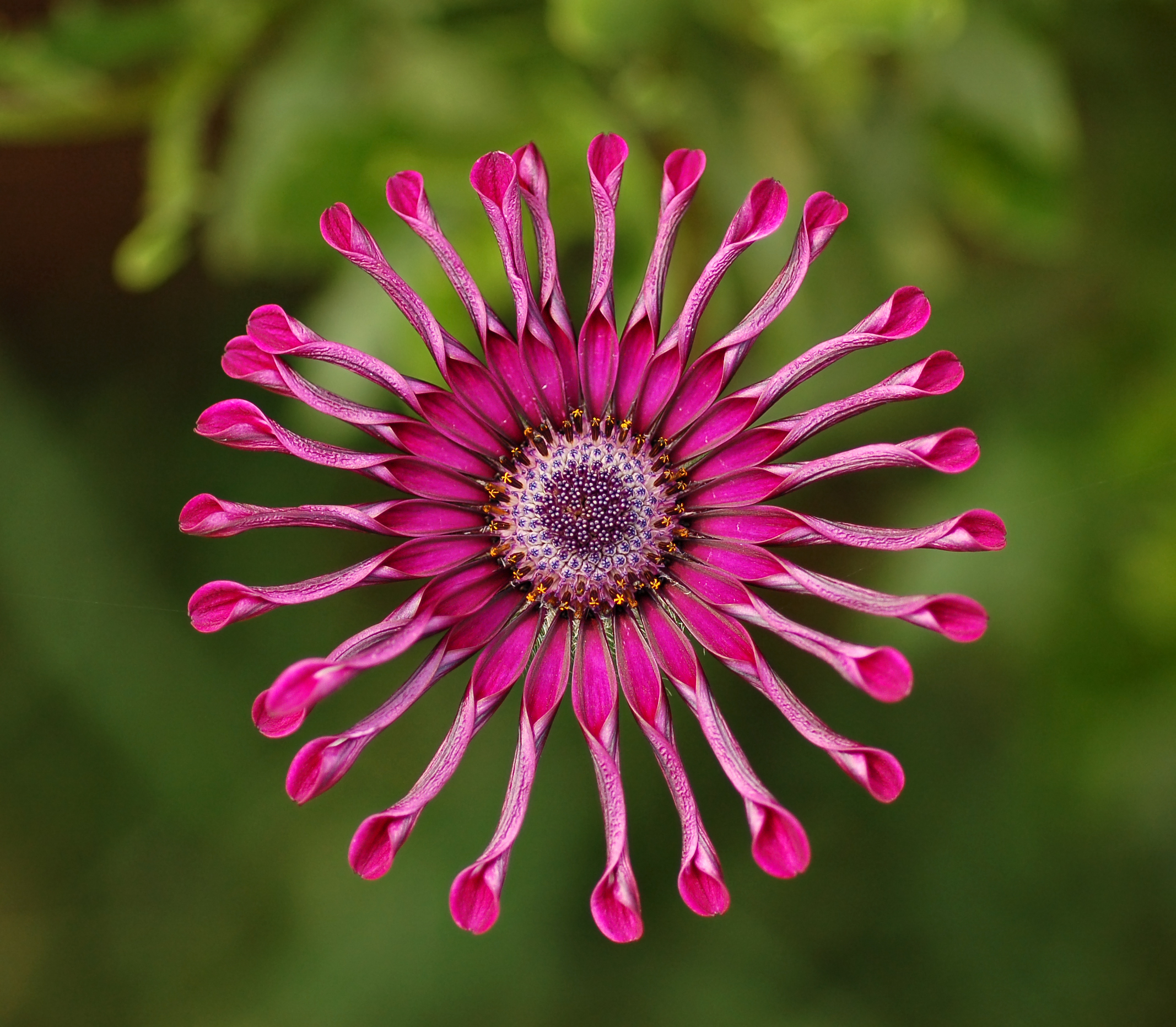
An osteospermum displayed as part of the 2008 Penn State horticultural trials

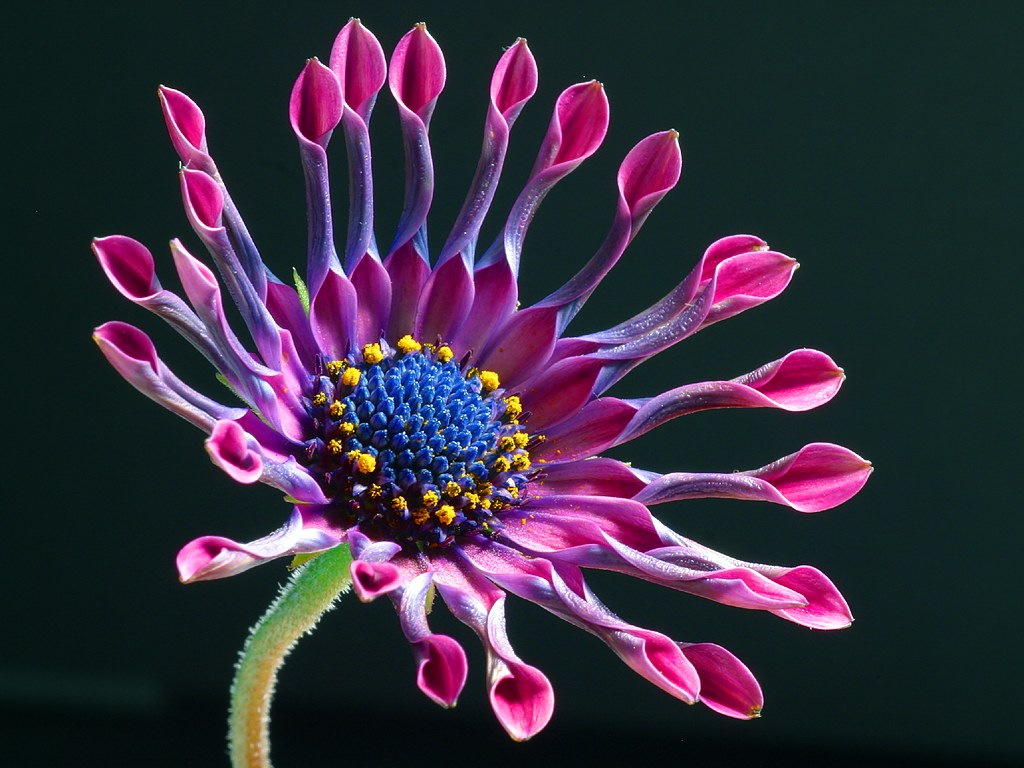
Osteospermum 'Pink Whirls'

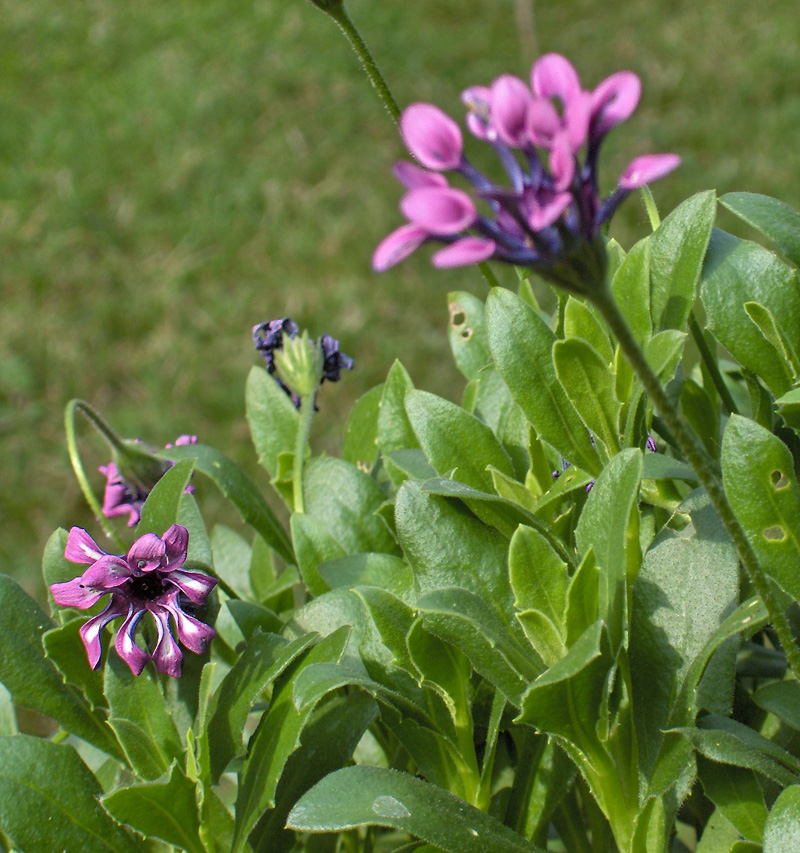
'Pink Whirls' close-up

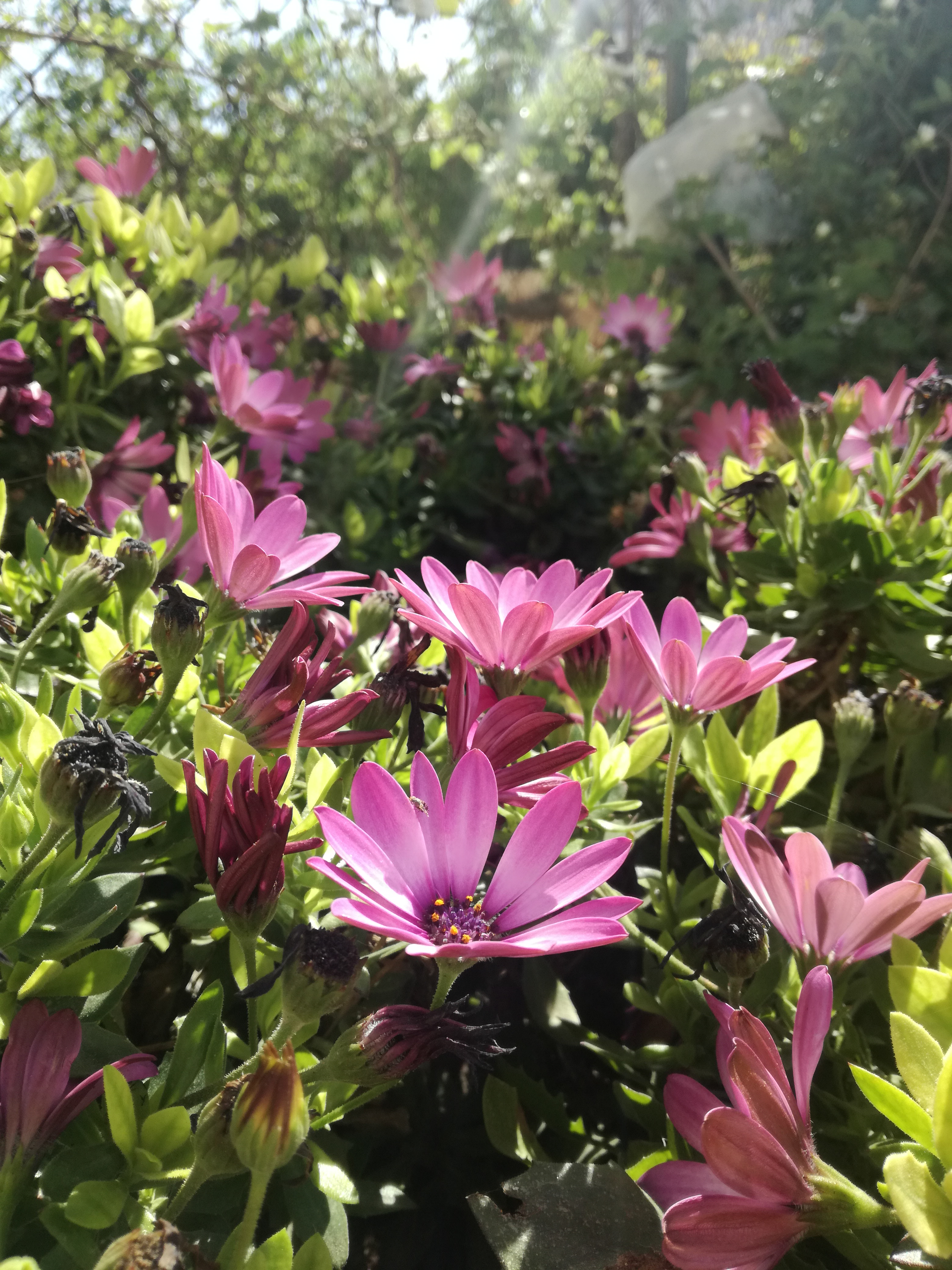

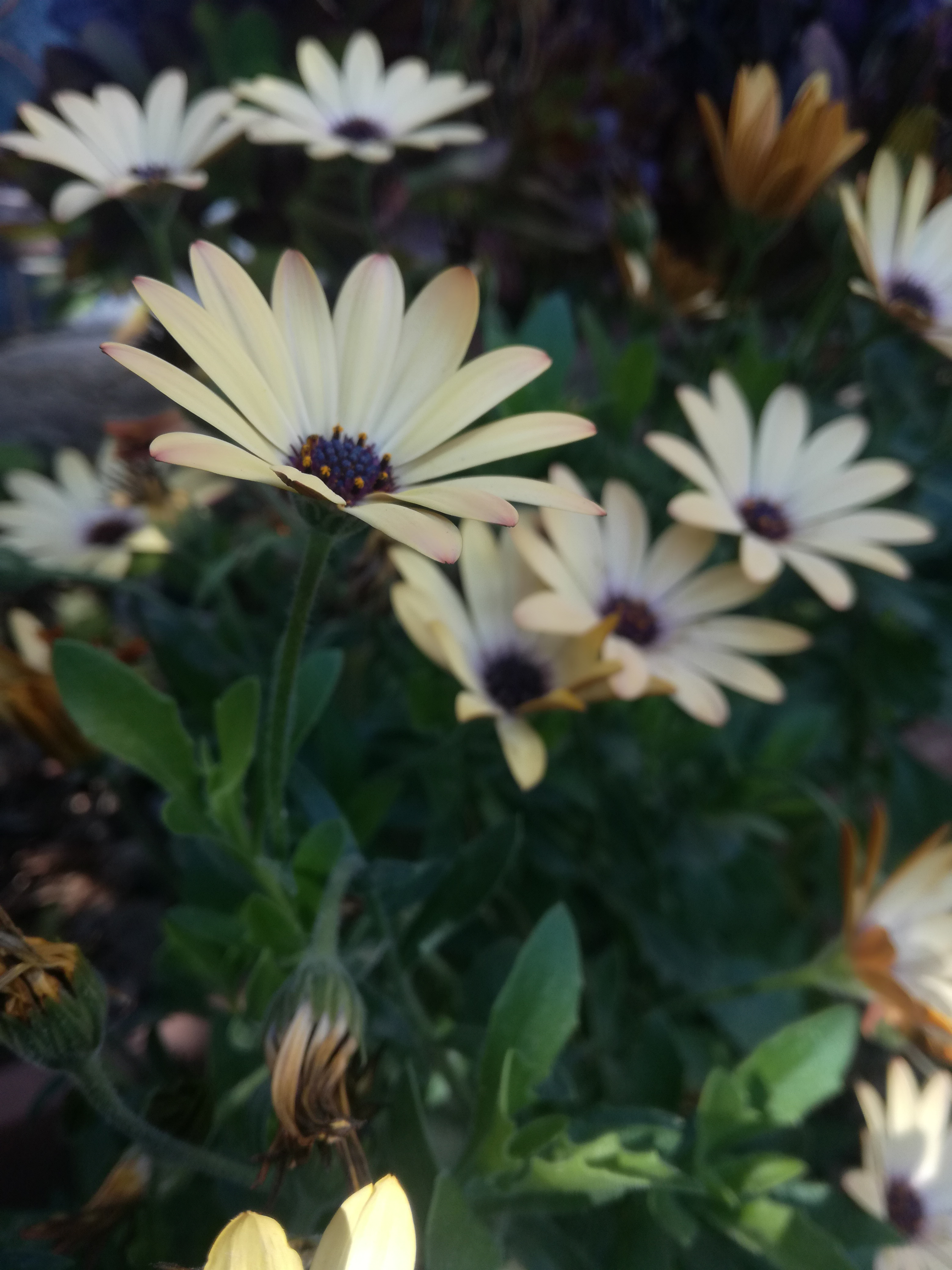

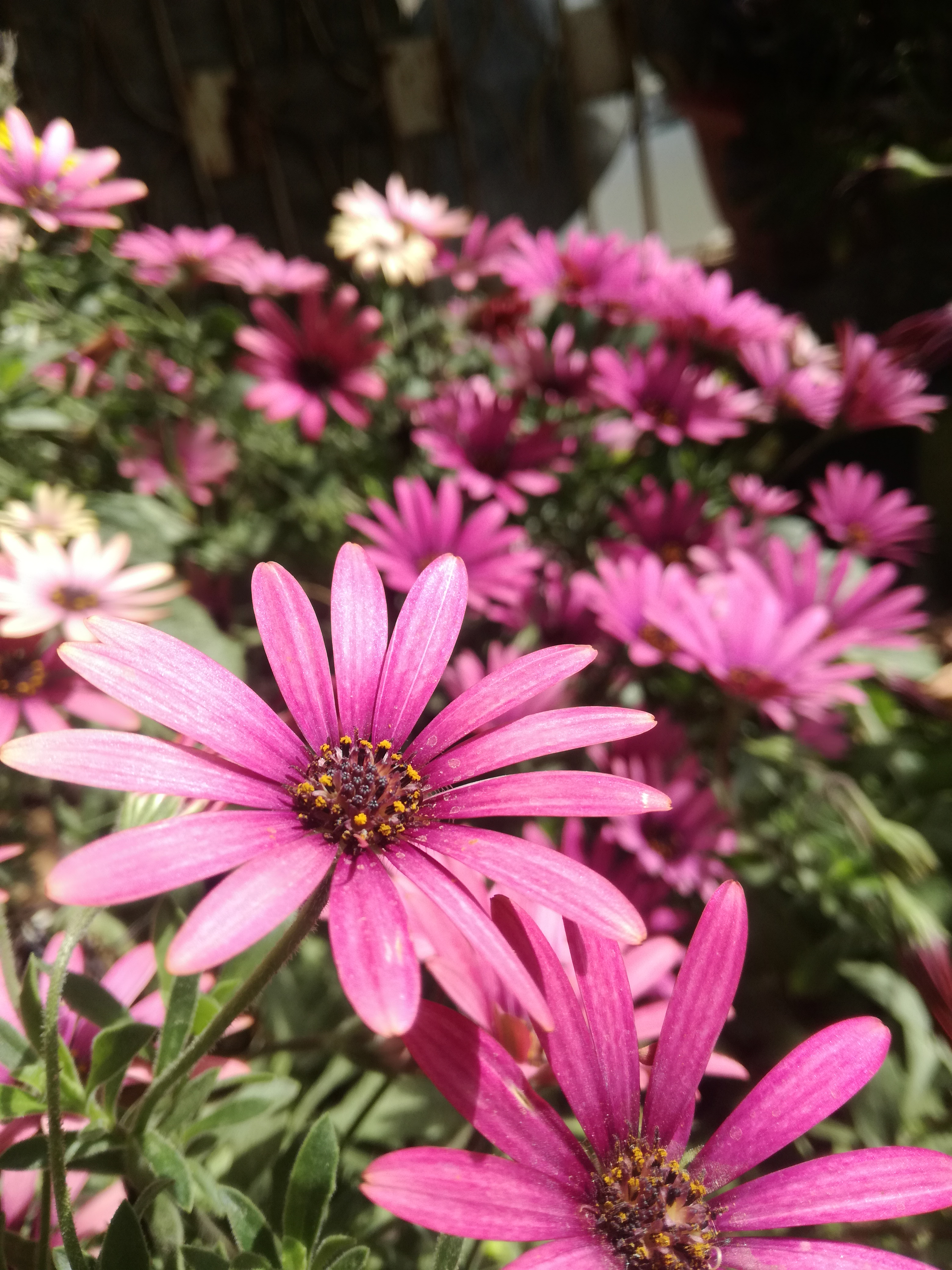

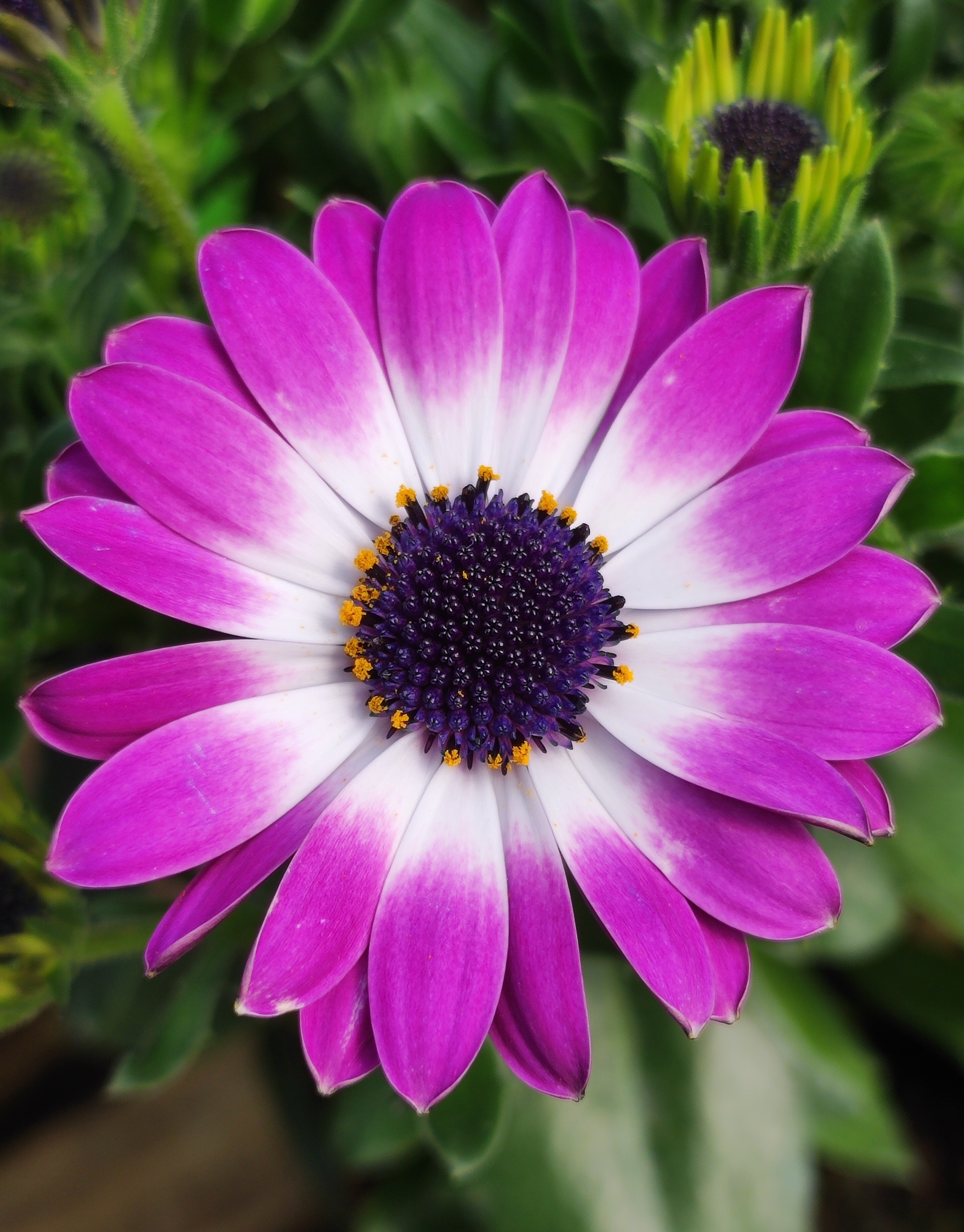
Osteospermum Cape Daisy 'Pink bicolor'

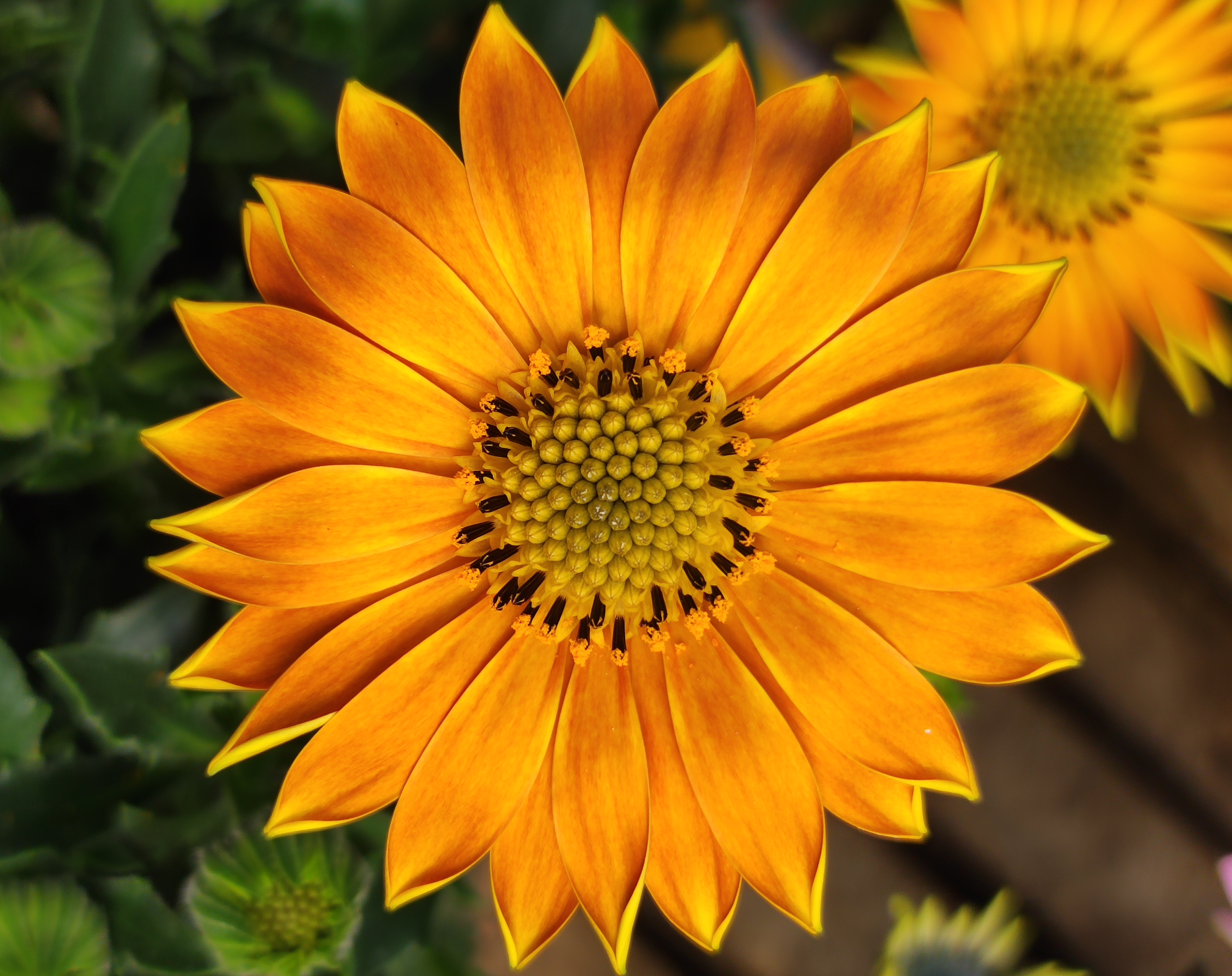
Osteospermum Sunset shades
