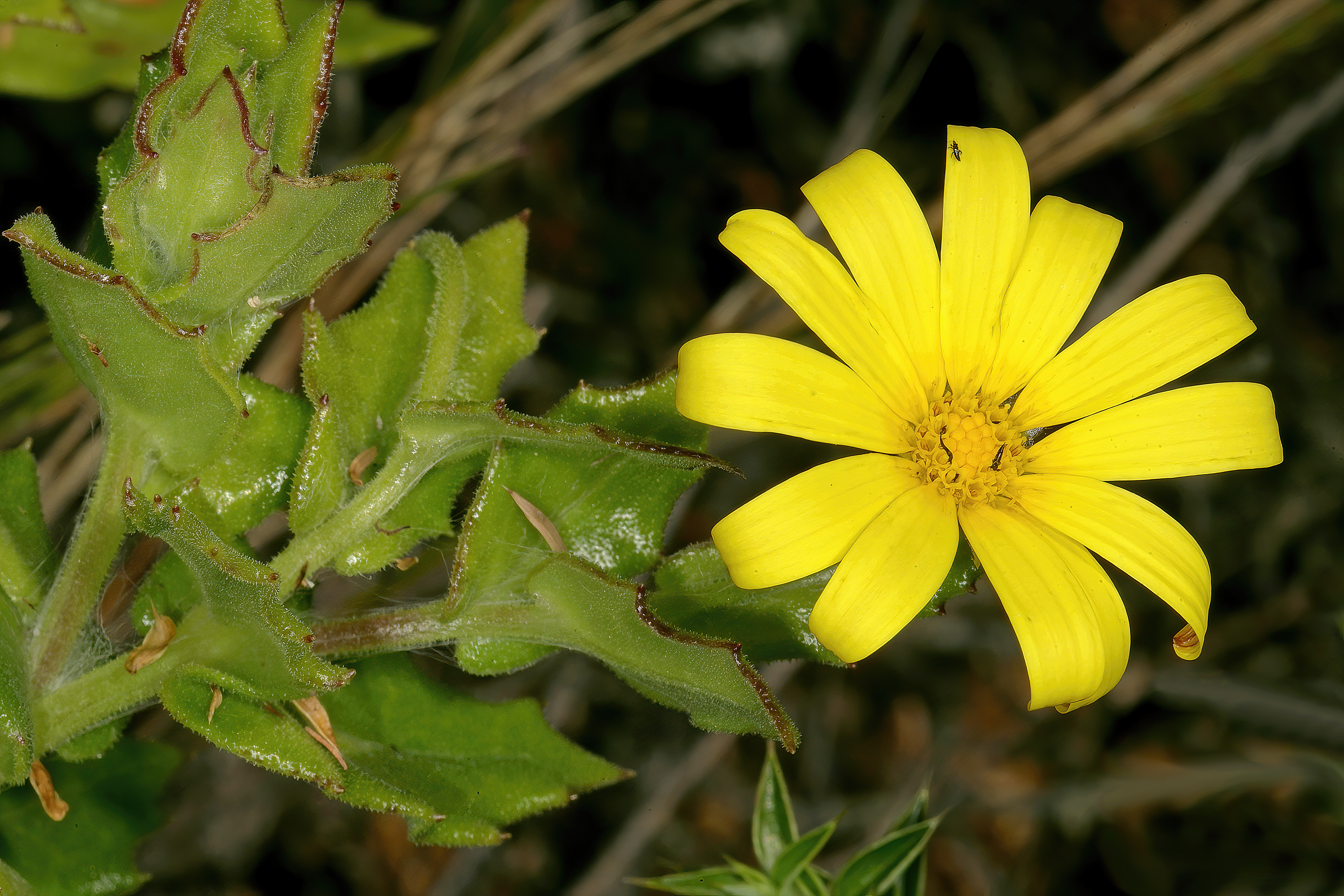
- Found in South Africa

Scientific classification
- Kingdom: Plantae
- Clade: Tracheophytes
- Clade: Angiosperms
- Clade: Eudicots
- Clade: Asterids
- Order: Asterales
- Family: Asteraceae
- Subfamily: Asteroideae
- Tribe: Calenduleae
- Genus: Osteospermum
- Species: O. ilicifolium

Binomial name
- Osteospermum ilicifolium L. (1759)

Synonyms
- Gibbaria ilicifolia (L.) Norl. (1943); Nephrotheca ilicifolia (L.) B.Nord. & Källersjö (2006)

= Osteospermum ilicifolium =

Jolly Boneseed

Genus of plants

Osteospermum ilicifolium (previously known as Nephrotheca ilicifolia), the jolly boneseed, is a species of flowering plant in the aster family, Asteraceae. It is endemic to the Cape Provinces in South Africa.

It is the sole species in section Nephrotheca within genus Osteospermum, which belongs to the Calendula tribe.
