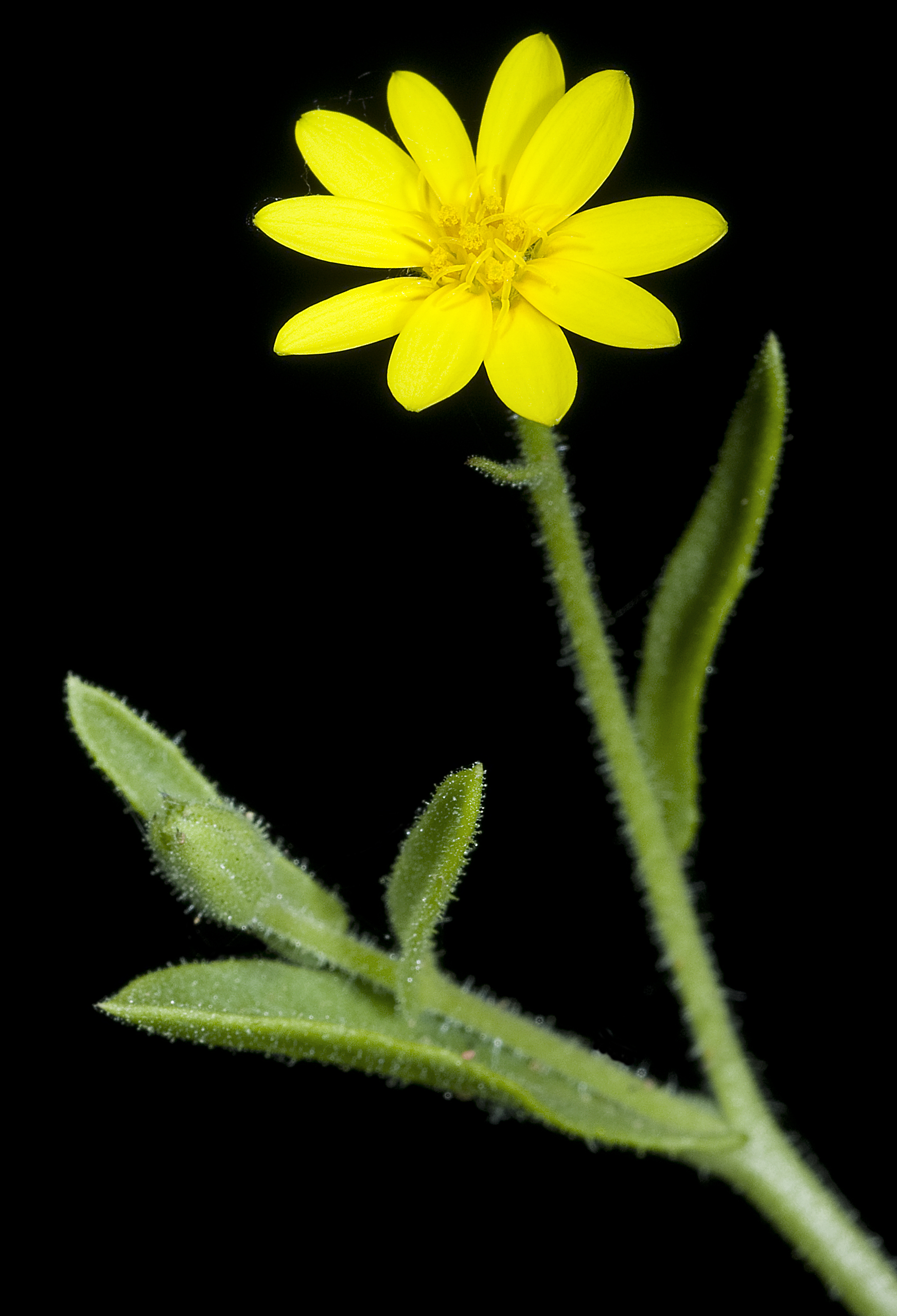

Scientific classification
- Kingdom: Plantae
- Clade: Embryophytes
- Clade: Tracheophytes
- Clade: Angiosperms
- Clade: Eudicots
- Clade: Asterids
- Order: Asterales
- Family: Asteraceae
- Tribe: Calenduleae
- Genus: Osteospermum
- Species: O. calendulaceum

Binomial name
- Osteospermum calendulaceum (L.f.) Less.

Synonyms
- Calendula parviflora Thunb. (1800); Oligocarpus calendulaceus Less. (1832)

= Osteospermum calendulaceum =

Species of flowering plant

Osteospermum calendulaceum is a plant in the family Asteraceae. It was first described in 1782 by Carl Linnaeus the Younger. In 1832, Christian Friedrich Lessing assigned it to the genus Oligocarpus in his Synopsis Generum Compositarum.

In South Africa, it is native to the Cape Provinces, Free State, KwaZulu-Natal, Lesotho, Northern Provinces and Eswatini. It has been introduced into Hawaii, South Australia and Western Australia. In Australia, it is an agricultural weed found mainly on arid lagoon shores and plains.
