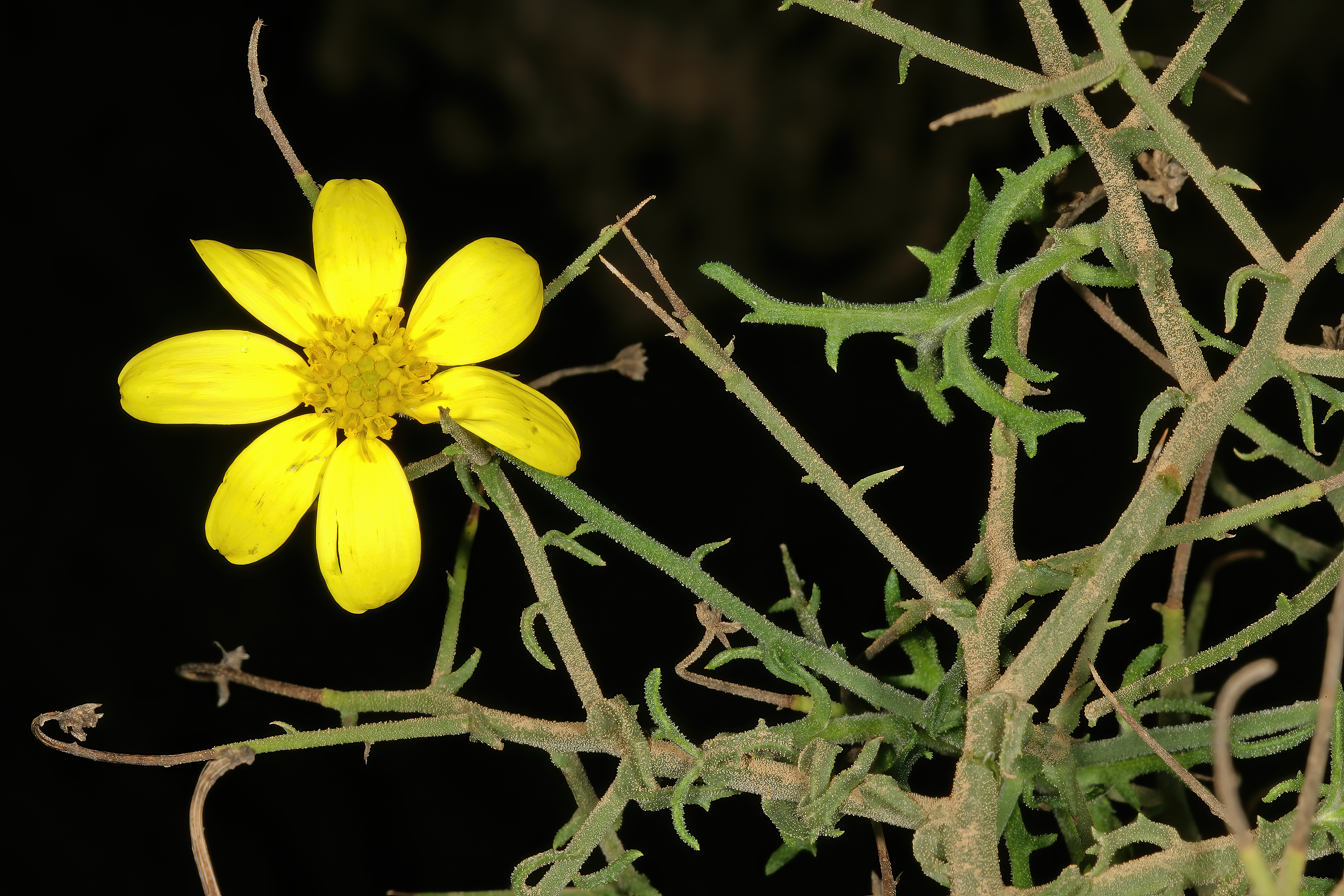

Scientific classification
- Kingdom: Plantae
- Clade: Tracheophytes
- Clade: Angiosperms
- Clade: Eudicots
- Clade: Asterids
- Order: Asterales
- Family: Asteraceae
- Genus: Osteospermum
- Species: O. spinosum

Binomial name
- Osteospermum spinosum L.

Varieties
- Osteospermum spinosum var. runcinatum P.J.Bergius; Osteospermum spinosum L. var. spinosum

Synonyms
- Buphthalmum durum L.; Eriocline obovata Cass.; Osteospermum osteospermum f. integrifolium O.Hoffm.; Osteospermum osteospermum subsp. integrifolium O.Hoffm.

= Osteospermum spinosum =

South African plant species

Osteospermum spinosum is a species of plant from South Africa.

== Description ==
This strongly and intricately branched shrub is aromatic and somewhat sticky. It grows up to 120 cm (47 in) tall. Branchlets and stems develop from spikes and remain thorny. Pale yellow flowers occur at the ends of the branches. They are most commonly present between May and October. After they fall and die, the stem holding them may be modified into spines. The achenes (small, dry fruit that contain a single seed) are dry and angled. They are about 8 mm (0.31 in) long.

== Distribution and habitat ==
This species is endemic to South Africa. It is found in the Pakhuis Mountains, the Tulbagh Mountains and the Riviersonderend Mountains. It grows on gravelly slopes and flats, mostly at lower elevations.
