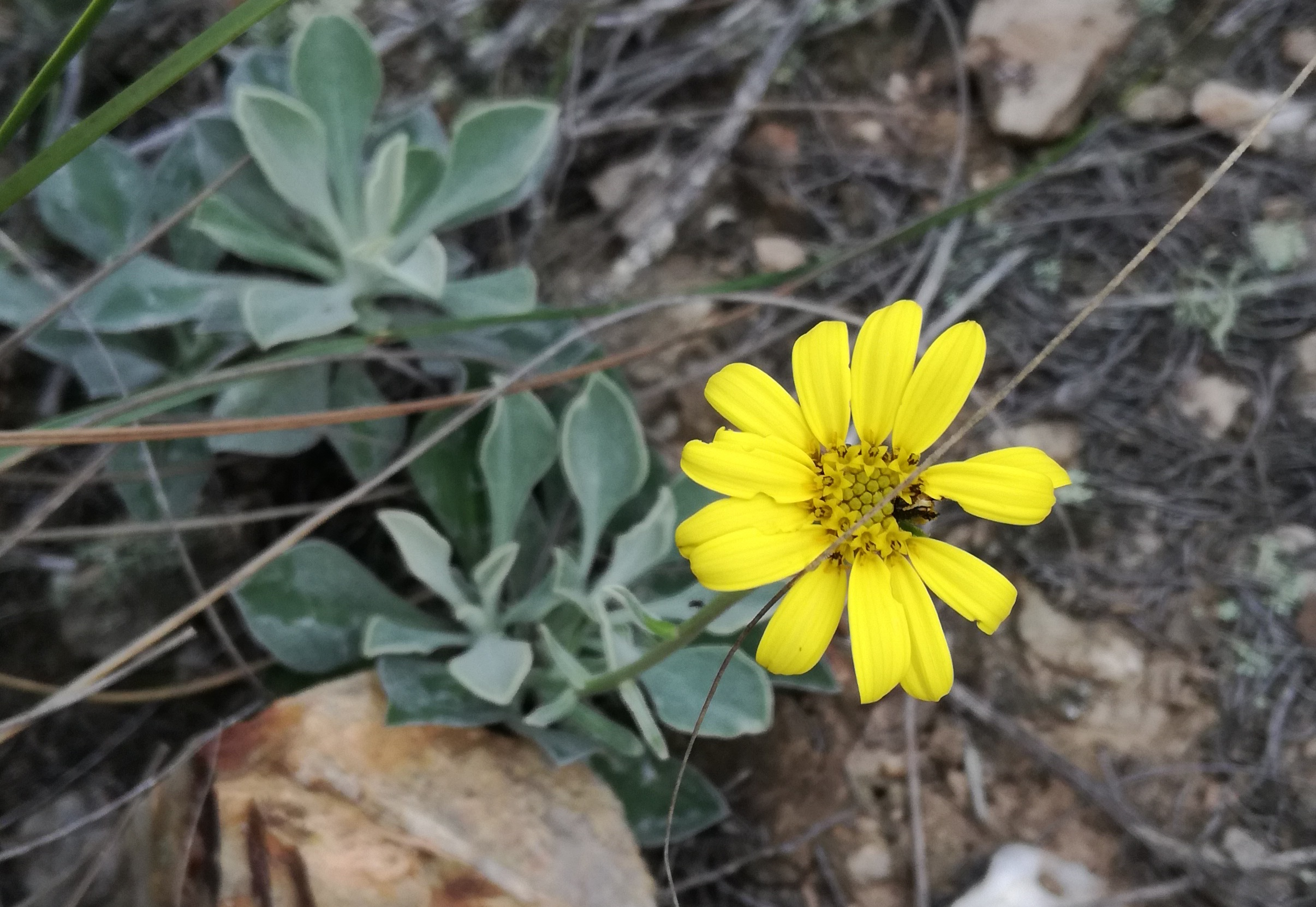

Scientific classification
- Kingdom: Plantae
- Clade: Embryophytes
- Clade: Tracheophytes
- Clade: Spermatophytes
- Clade: Angiosperms
- Clade: Eudicots
- Clade: Asterids
- Order: Asterales
- Family: Asteraceae
- Genus: Osteospermum
- Species: O. tomentosum

Binomial name
- Osteospermum tomentosum (L.f.) Norl.

Synonyms
- Osteospermum subsect. Tomentosa Norl.; Calendula tomentosa L.f.; Inuloides tomentosa (L.f.) B.Nord.; Tripteris tomentosa (L.f.) Less.; Osteospermum tomentosum (L.f.) Norl.; Calendula tomentosa Thunb.; Osteospermum cuspidatum DC.

= Osteospermum tomentosum =

Species of daisy

Osteospermum tomentosum, the woolly boneseed, is species in the genus Osteospermum (daisy family) native to the Cape Province region of South Africa. In the past, it was under the monospecific genus Inuloides as Inuloides tomentosa.
