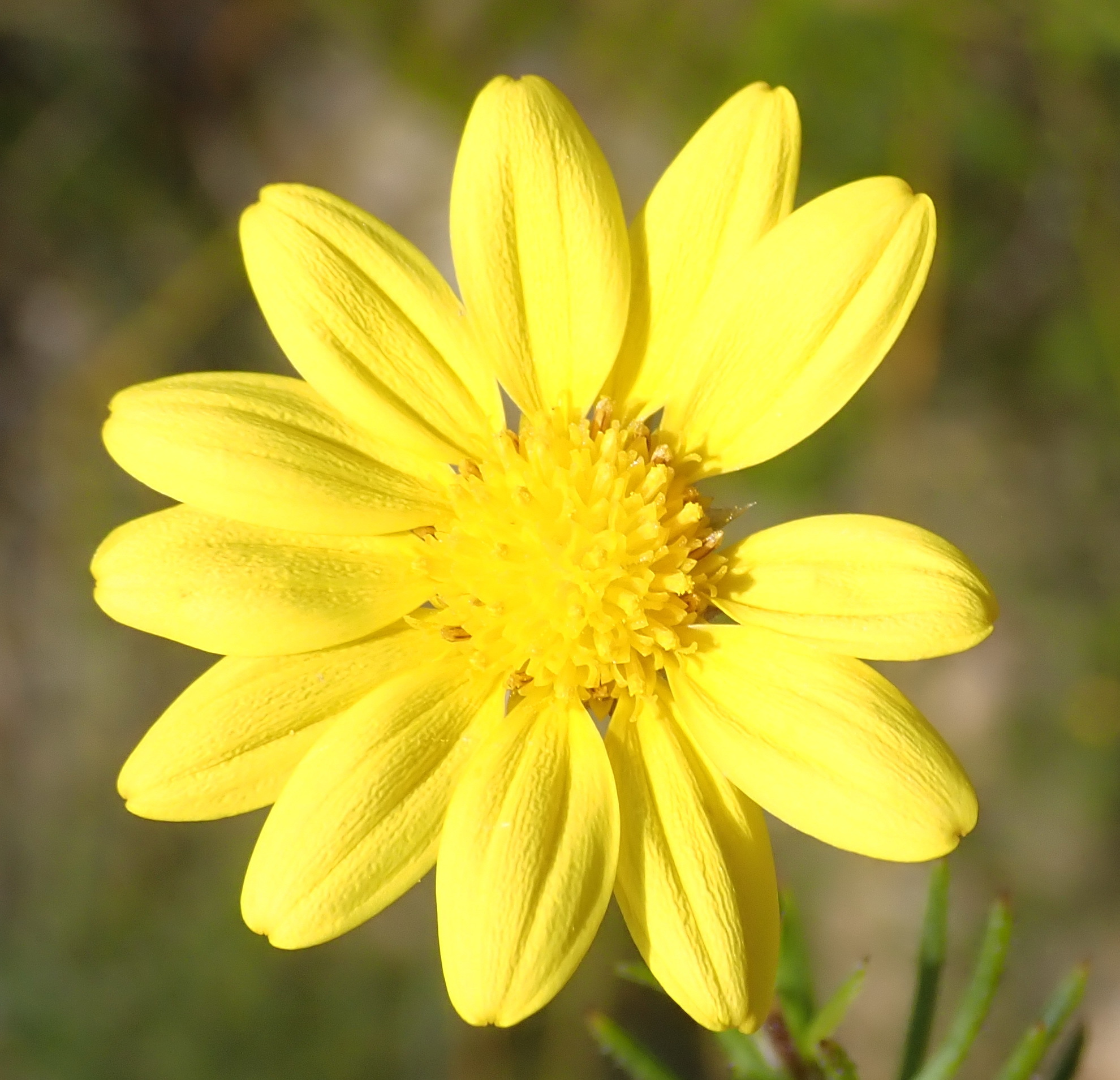
- Gibbaria scabra

Scientific classification
- Kingdom: Plantae
- Clade: Tracheophytes
- Clade: Angiosperms
- Clade: Eudicots
- Clade: Asterids
- Order: Asterales
- Family: Asteraceae
- Subfamily: Asteroideae
- Tribe: Calenduleae
- Genus: Gibbaria; Cass.

Species
- Gibbaria glabra (N.E.Br.) B.Nord. & Källersjö; Gibbaria scabra (Thunb.) Norl.

Synonyms
- Anaglypha DC.; Xerothamnus DC.

= Gibbaria =

Genus of plants

Gibbaria is a genus of plants in the sunflower family Asteraceae, endemic to the Cape Provinces of South Africa. As of April 2023, Plants of the World Online accepted two species: Gibbaria glabra and Gibbaria scabra.
