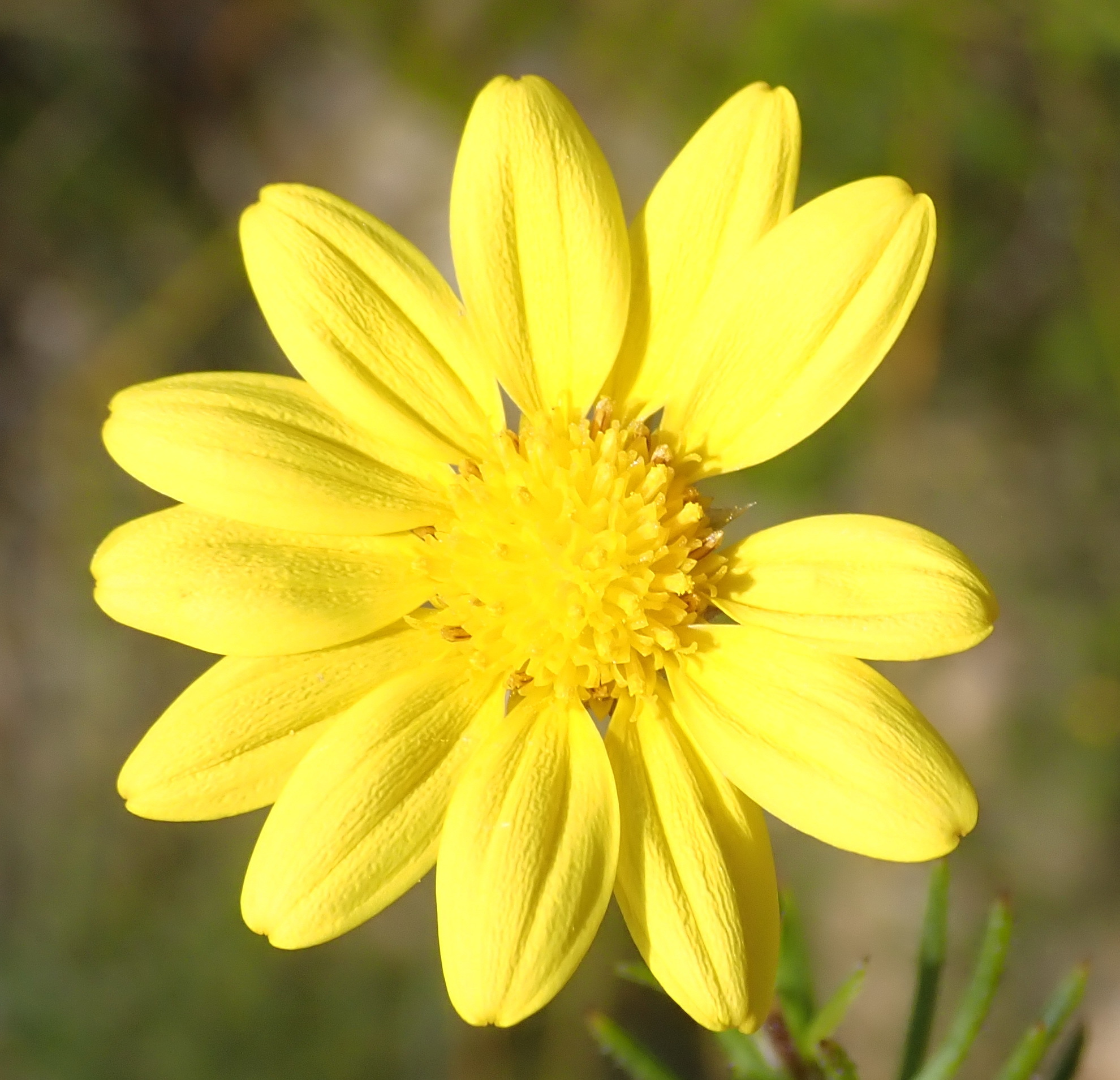

Scientific classification
- Kingdom: Plantae
- Clade: Tracheophytes
- Clade: Angiosperms
- Clade: Eudicots
- Clade: Asterids
- Order: Asterales
- Family: Asteraceae
- Genus: Gibbaria
- Species: G. scabra

Binomial name
- Gibbaria scabra (Thunb.) Norl.

Synonyms
- Anaglypha aspera DC.; Gibbaria bicolor Cass.; Osteospermum scabrum Thunb.; Xerothamnus ecklonianus DC.

= Gibbaria scabra =

Species of plant

Gibbaria scabra is a species of flowering plant in the family Asteraceae, endemic to the Cape Provinces of South Africa. It was first described in 1943 as Osteospermum scabrum.
