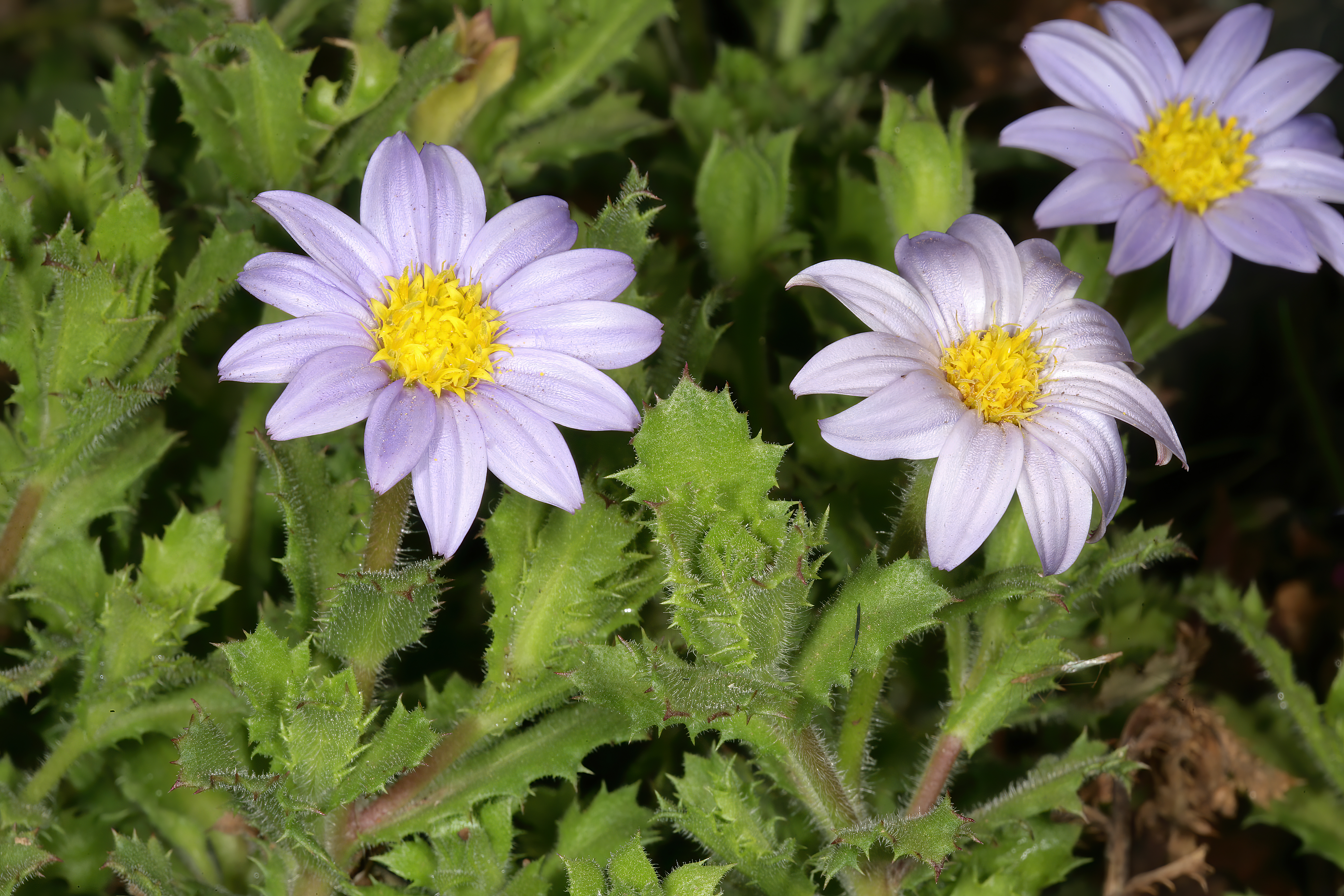
- Garuleum sonchifolium

Scientific classification
- Kingdom: Plantae
- Clade: Tracheophytes
- Clade: Angiosperms
- Clade: Eudicots
- Clade: Asterids
- Order: Asterales
- Family: Asteraceae
- Subfamily: Asteroideae
- Tribe: Calenduleae
- Genus: Garuleum; Cass.

Type species
- Garuleum viscosum (syn of G. pinnatifidum) Cass.

= Garuleum =

Genus of plants

Garuleum is a genus of flowering plants in the family Asteraceae, native to southern Africa. Garuleum is one of eight genera of Calenduleae.

== Description ==
The style of disc florets are deeply bifurcate (forked) with linear lobes. They are covered with papillae to well below point of bifurcation.

== Species ==
The following species are recognised:

- Garuleum album S.Moore - Cape Provinces
- Garuleum bipinnatum Less. - Cape Provinces
- Garuleum latifolium Harv. - KwaZulu-Natal
- Garuleum pinnatifidum DC. - Cape Provinces, Free State, Limpopo
- Garuleum schinzii O.Hoffm. ex Schinz - Cape Provinces, Namibia
- Garuleum sonchifolium (DC.) Norl. - KwaZulu-Natal, Cape Provinces
- Garuleum tanacetifolium (MacOwan) Norl. - Cape Provinces
- Garuleum woodii Schinz - KwaZulu-Natal, Free State, Limpopo, Lesotho
