= Osteospermum burttianum =

Scientific classification
- Kingdom: Plantae
- Clade: Tracheophytes
- Clade: Angiosperms
- Clade: Eudicots
- Clade: Asterids
- Order: Asterales
- Family: Asteraceae
- Genus: Osteospermum
- Species: O. burttianum

Binomial name
- Osteospermum burttianum B.Nord.

South African plant species

Osteospermum burttianum is a species of plant from South Africa.

== Description ==
=== Growthform ===
This shrublet is densely leafy and hairless. It grows up to 1 m (3.3 ft) tall.

=== Leaves ===
The hairless leaves are attached directly to the stems and are alternately arranged. They have a distinct midrib and the margins are either finely toothed or rough with small, brownish hairs. They have a leathery texture.

=== Flowers ===
Flowers are most common between December and May. Flowers may, however, be present until August. They are yellow in colour. They grow in solitary capitula and are heterogamous. They grow on stalks that are 3–10 cm (1.2–3.9 in) long with 1-3 bract-like leaves.

The involucre has a diameter of 10–15 mm (0.39–0.59 in) and is made of 8-13 narrow bracts. They have short. dark-tipped glandular hairs and net-like veination.

The ray florets are female. There are 8-11 of them per flowerhead. The tube lobes are somewhat oval shaped and crested at the tips. They lack a midvein. The ovary is a narrow hairless and two-veined oblong. In the male florets, the stamen are 2 mm (0.079 in) long. The style is sterile and tipped with a cone surrounded by a fringe of short hairs.

=== Fruit and seeds ===
This plant produces obscurely ribbed achenes (dry fruit containing a single seed) They are 5–7 mm (0.20–0.28 in) long.

== Distribution and habitat ==
This species is endemic to the Langeberg Mountains in the Western Cape of South Africa. It has a range of less than 500 km^{2} (190 sq mi), in which two populations occur. It prefers steep rocky sandstone slopes. It is found on south facing slopes at an altitude of over 1,000 m (3,300 ft).

== Etymology ==
This species is named after B.L. (Bill) Burtt in honour of his contributions to the knowledge of South African phytogeography and the family Asteraceae.

== Conservation ==
While Osteospermum burttianum does not currently experience any threats, its small range means that it is currently classified as rare by the South African National Biodiversity Institute.
