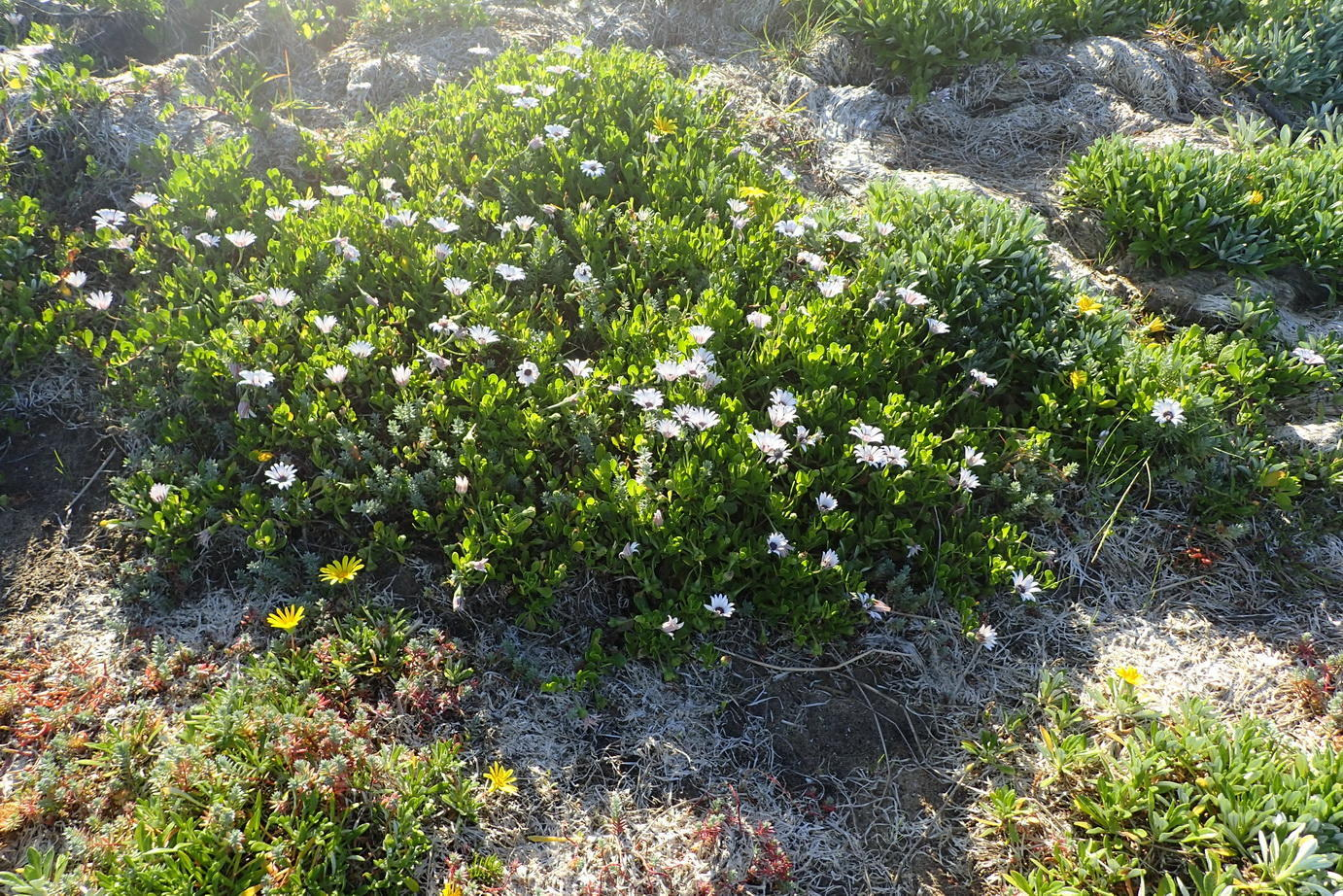

Scientific classification
- Kingdom: Plantae
- Clade: Tracheophytes
- Clade: Angiosperms
- Clade: Eudicots
- Clade: Asterids
- Order: Asterales
- Family: Asteraceae
- Genus: Dimorphotheca
- Species: D. fruticosa

Binomial name
- Dimorphotheca fruticosa L. DC. (1838)

Synonyms
- Calendula fruticosa L. (1760); Blaxium decumbens Cass. (1824); Calendula diffusa Salisb. (1796); Osteospermum fruticosum (L.) (Norl.); Osteospermum riparium O.Hoffm. (1898)

= Dimorphotheca fruticosa =

Perennial herb native to South Africa

Dimorphotheca fruticosa, is a species of perennial herb native to coastal areas of South Africa. It is commonly known as trailing African daisy, and by its synonym Osteospermum fruticosum.

It has been classified as a weed in New Zealand where it is now a widespread coastal plant, particularly in the North Island.
