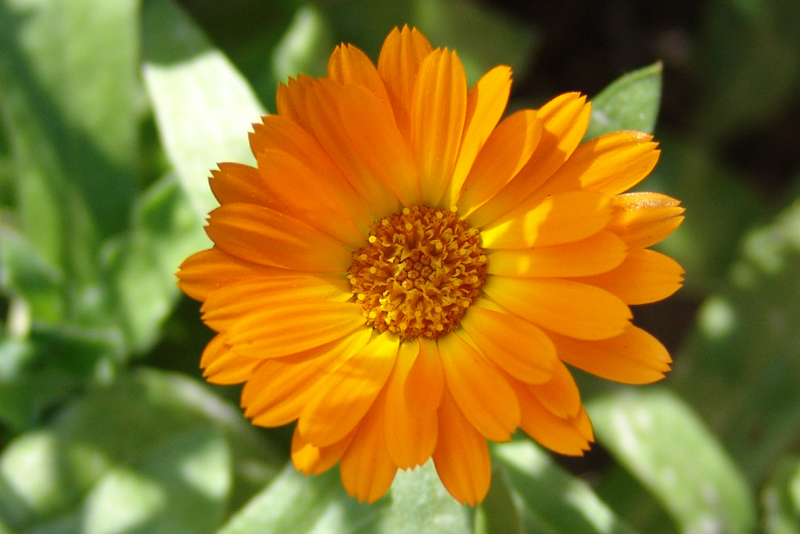
- Calenduleae sp.

Scientific classification
- Kingdom: Plantae
- Clade: Tracheophytes
- Clade: Angiosperms
- Clade: Eudicots
- Clade: Asterids
- Order: Asterales
- Family: Asteraceae
- Subfamily: Asteroideae
- Tribe: Calenduleae; Cassini

Genera
- Calendula; Chrysanthemoides; Dimorphotheca; Garuleum; Gibbaria; Inuloides; Monoculus; Nephrotheca; Norlindhia; Oligocarpus; Osteospermum; Tripteris

= Calenduleae =

Tribe of flowering plants

Calenduleae is a flowering plant tribe of the family Asteraceae. Calenduleae has been widely recognized since Alexandre de Cassini in the early 19th century. There are eight genera and over 110 species, mostly found in South Africa.

It is a relatively stable clade of the Asteraceae, with minor alterations. The tribe also occurs in Southwest Asia, some Atlantic islands, other portions of Africa and Europe, with non-native occurrences in the US, Australia, and New Zealand. However, three new species within the tribe have been discovered as recently as 2003.

== Description ==
Plants in Calenduleae vary from herbs to shrubs and usually exhibit showy flower heads. The defining characteristics separating members of this tribe from others within the family are a dimorphism of the cypselae and the fact that each cypsela lacks a pappus.^{[2]} Calenduleae is named for its most economically important genus, Calendula, known in homeopathic remedies and as a common ornamental. Other genera from Calenduleae produce ornamentals as well, including Osteospermum and Dimorphotheca (see Asteraceae for a more general description).

== History and phylogeny ==
Cladistic arrangement of this group of plants has been recognized as far back as Andrea Cesalpino in the 1630s and again by Giulio Pontedera in the 1720s, but the official nomenclature arose after Cassini's work within the family. Early 20th-century botanists placed this tribe as sister to the Senecioneae; however, there has been molecular evidence of closer relationships between the Astereae and the Calenduleae. This tribe has demonstrated monophyly through chemical analysis of the similar pimarane diterpenes found within all tested species. Osteospermum and Garuleum share the highest number of identical chemical signatures, indicating close phylogenetic relationship and a more recent divergence than other genera of the tribe. One of the newly discovered Osteospermum has provided evidence of a link between Osteospermum and Chrysanthemoides.

There have been some rearrangements of the Calenduleae tribe. Eriachaenium was originally lumped with the Calenduleae but has since been removed. Its placement remains uncertain, although it is now hypothesized to belong to the Cichorioideae. The genus Castalis has been folded into Osteospermum. One recent analysis of the Calenduleae made several phylogenetic discoveries, including:

- the Osteospermum section Blaxium is now placed in the genus Dimorphotheca
- the subgenus Tripteris was separated from Osteospermum
- the genus Oligocarpus was separated from Osteospermum
- Osteospermum sanctae-helenae, endemic to St. Helena, now belongs to Oligocarpus.

== Image gallery ==
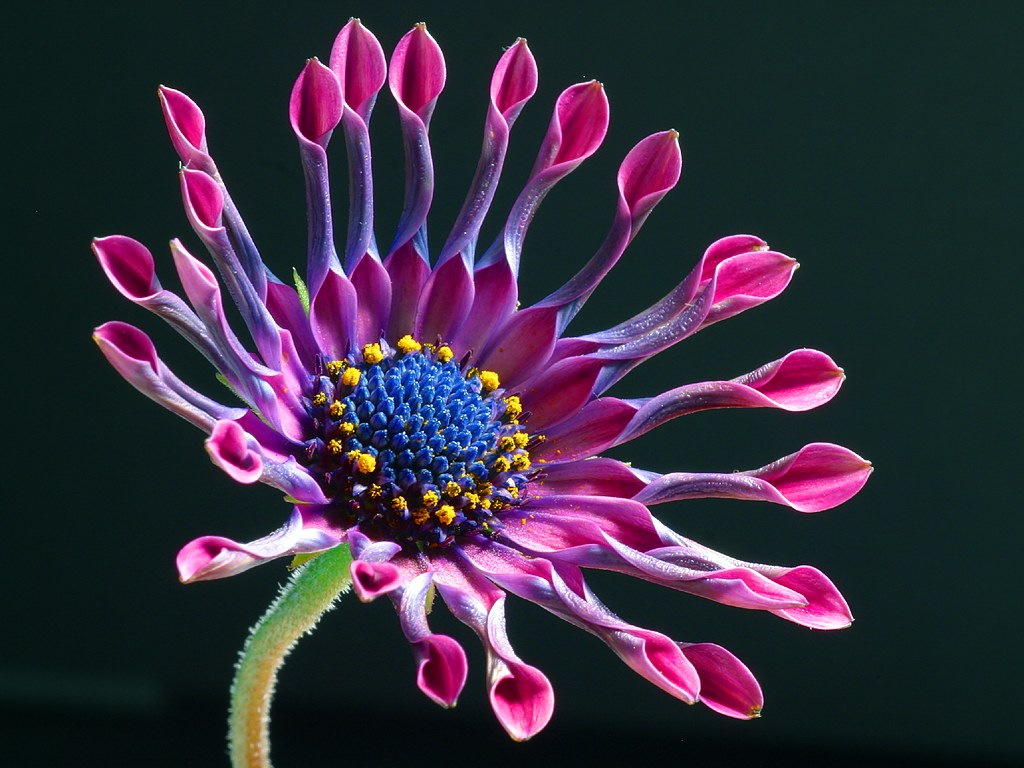
Osteospermum "Pink Whirls", a cultivar

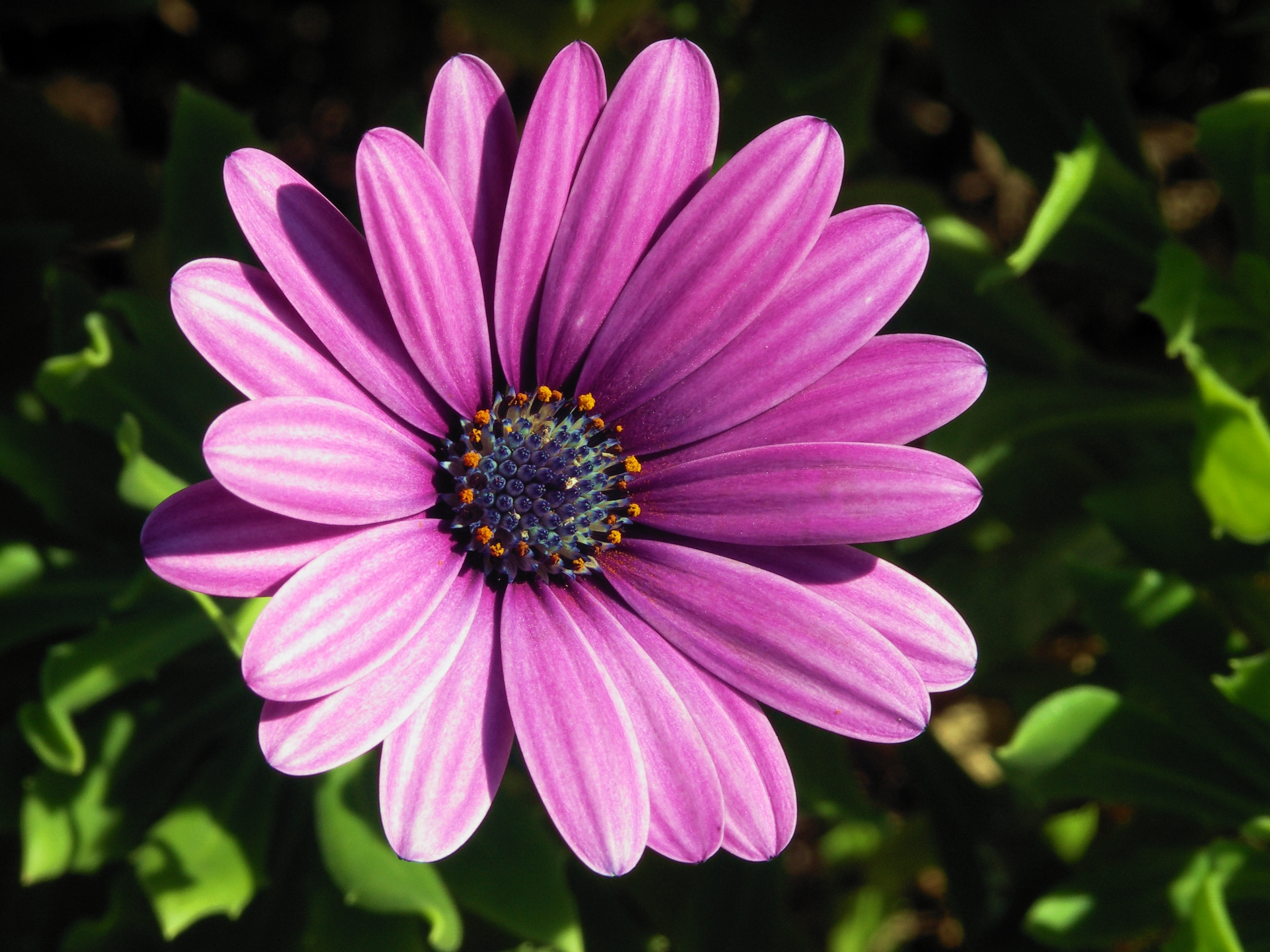
Dimorphotheca ecklonis syn. Osteospermum ecklonis

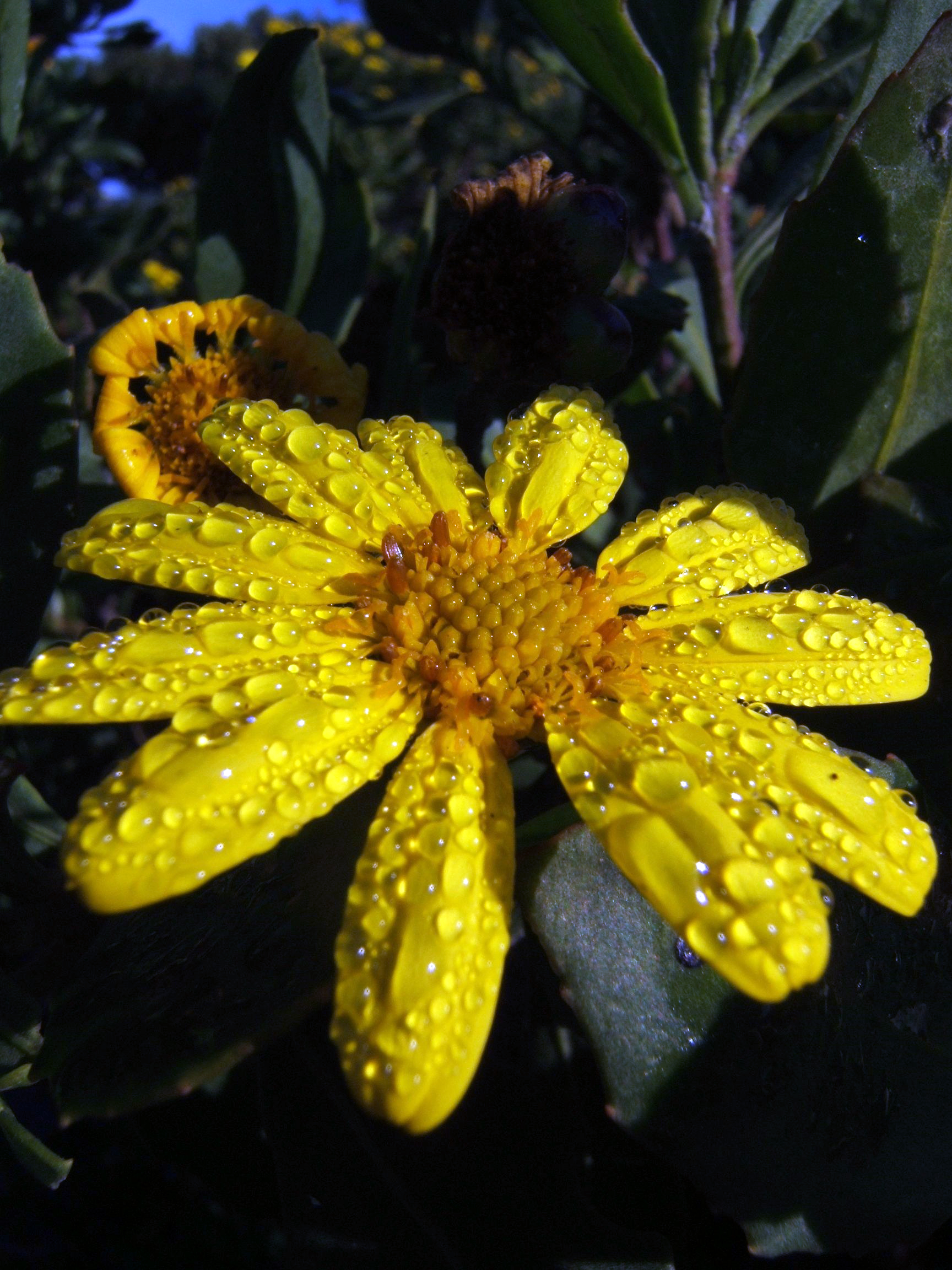
Osteospermum moniliferum

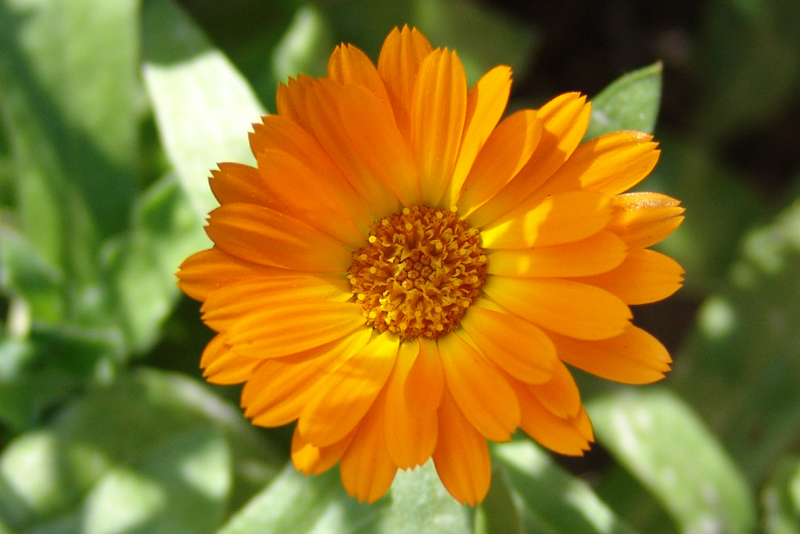
Calendula officinalis
