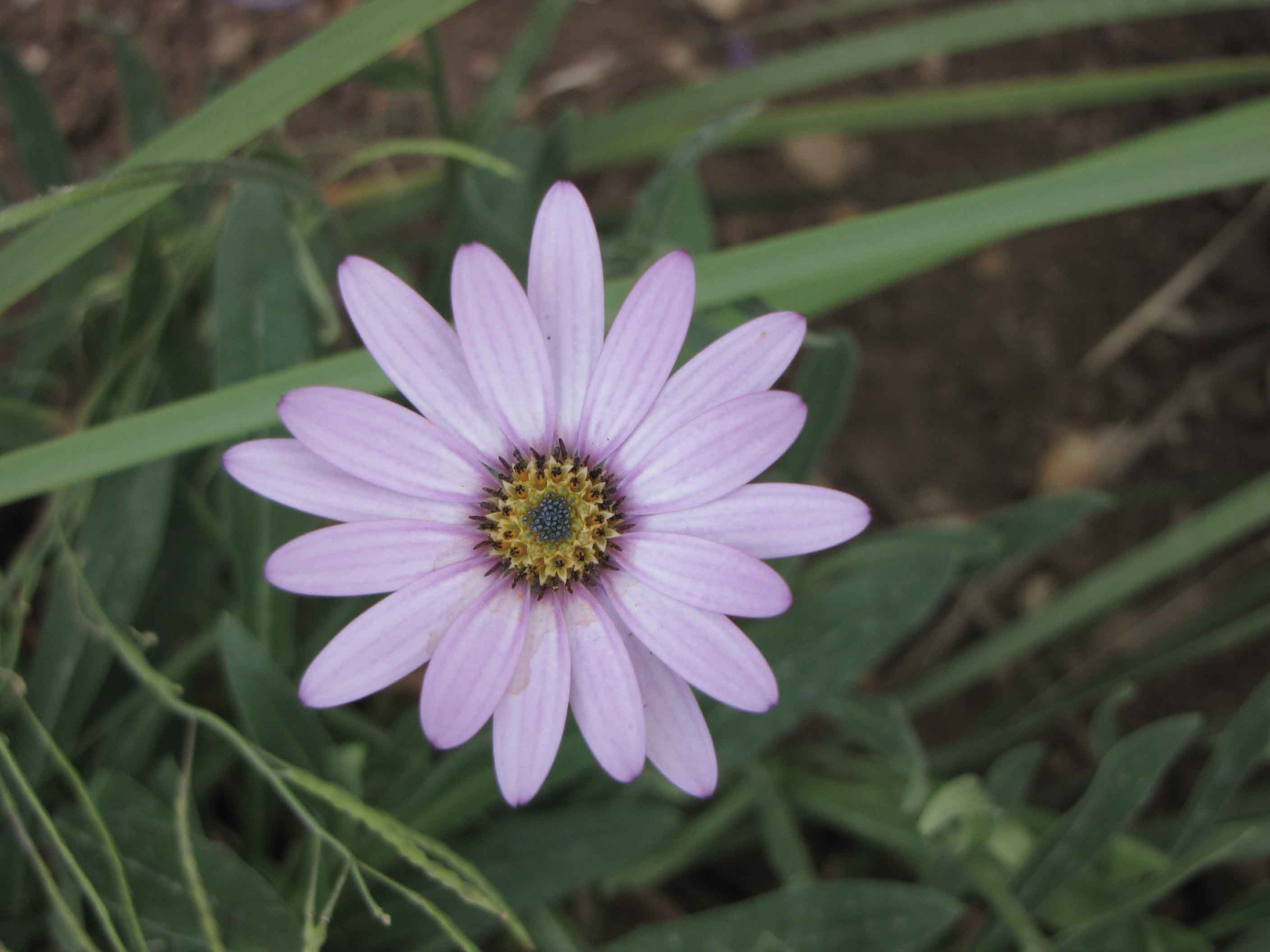
- At the University of Oxford Botanic Garden

Scientific classification
- Kingdom: Plantae
- Clade: Embryophytes
- Clade: Tracheophytes
- Clade: Angiosperms
- Clade: Eudicots
- Clade: Asterids
- Order: Asterales
- Family: Asteraceae
- Genus: Dimorphotheca
- Species: D. jucunda

Binomial name
- Dimorphotheca jucunda E.Phillips

Synonyms
- Osteospermum jucundum (E.Phillips) Norl.

= Dimorphotheca jucunda =

Species of flowering plant

Dimorphotheca jucunda, the delightful African daisy, is a species of flowering plant in the family Asteraceae. It is native to South Africa, Lesotho and Eswatini, and introduced to Ireland and Tasmania. As its synonym Osteospermum jucundum, it and two of its cultivars, 'Blackthorn Seedling' and 'Langtrees' have gained the Royal Horticultural Society's Award of Garden Merit.

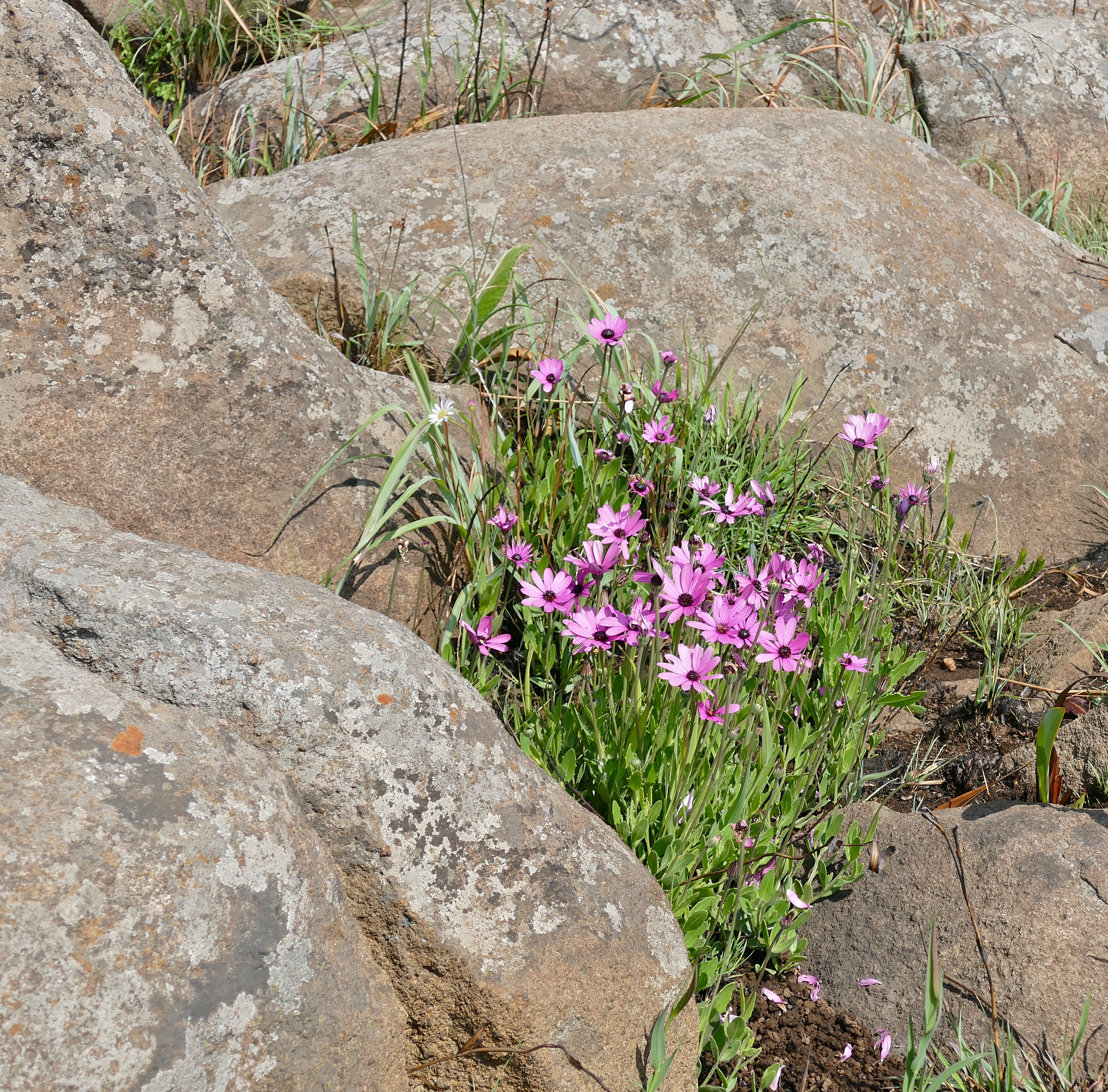
In the wild in South Africa

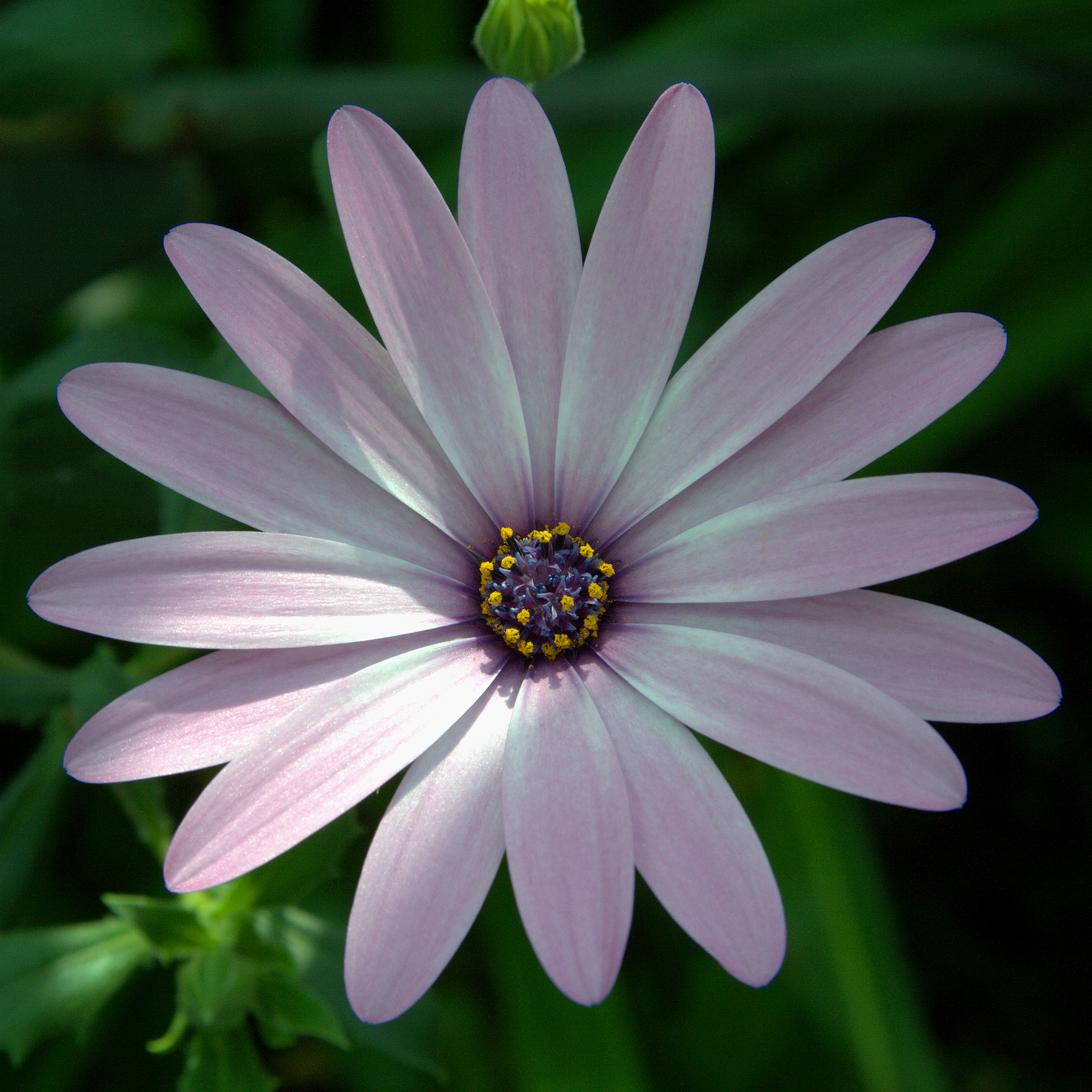
Close-up of flower

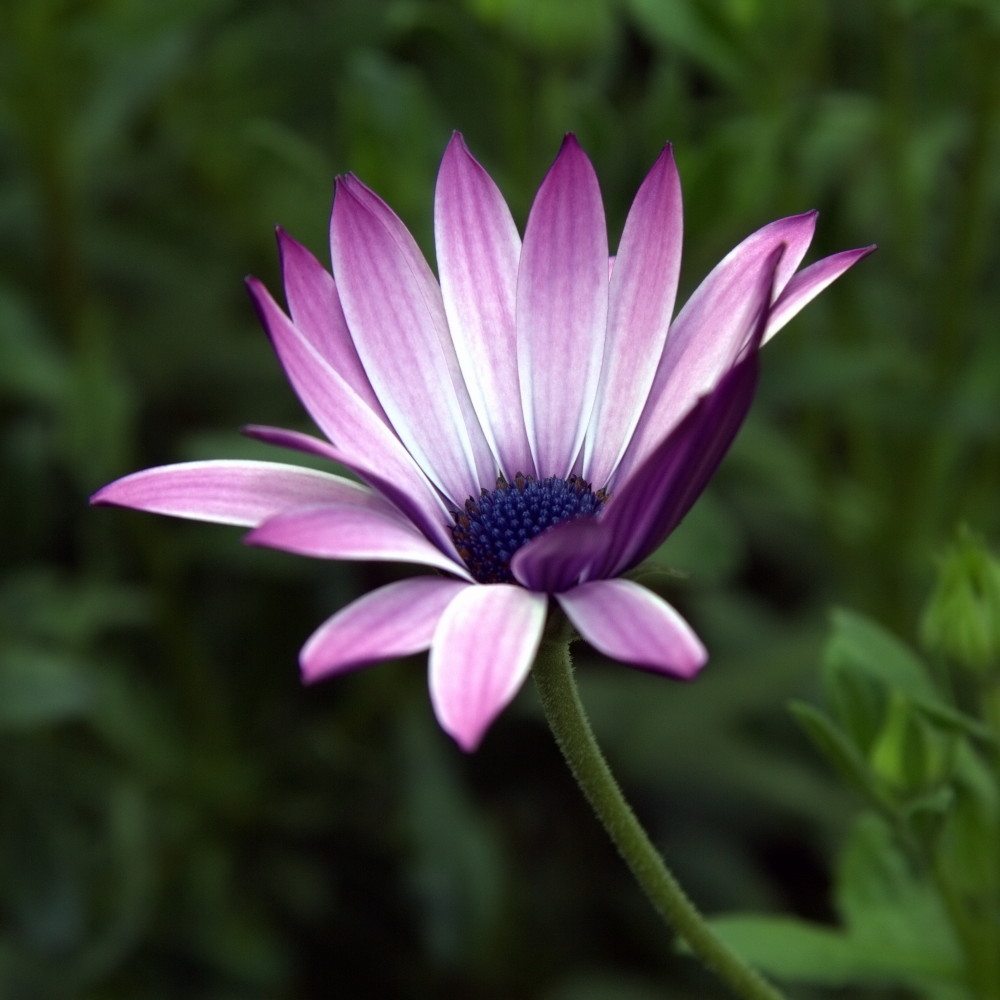
At the Gothenburg Botanical Garden

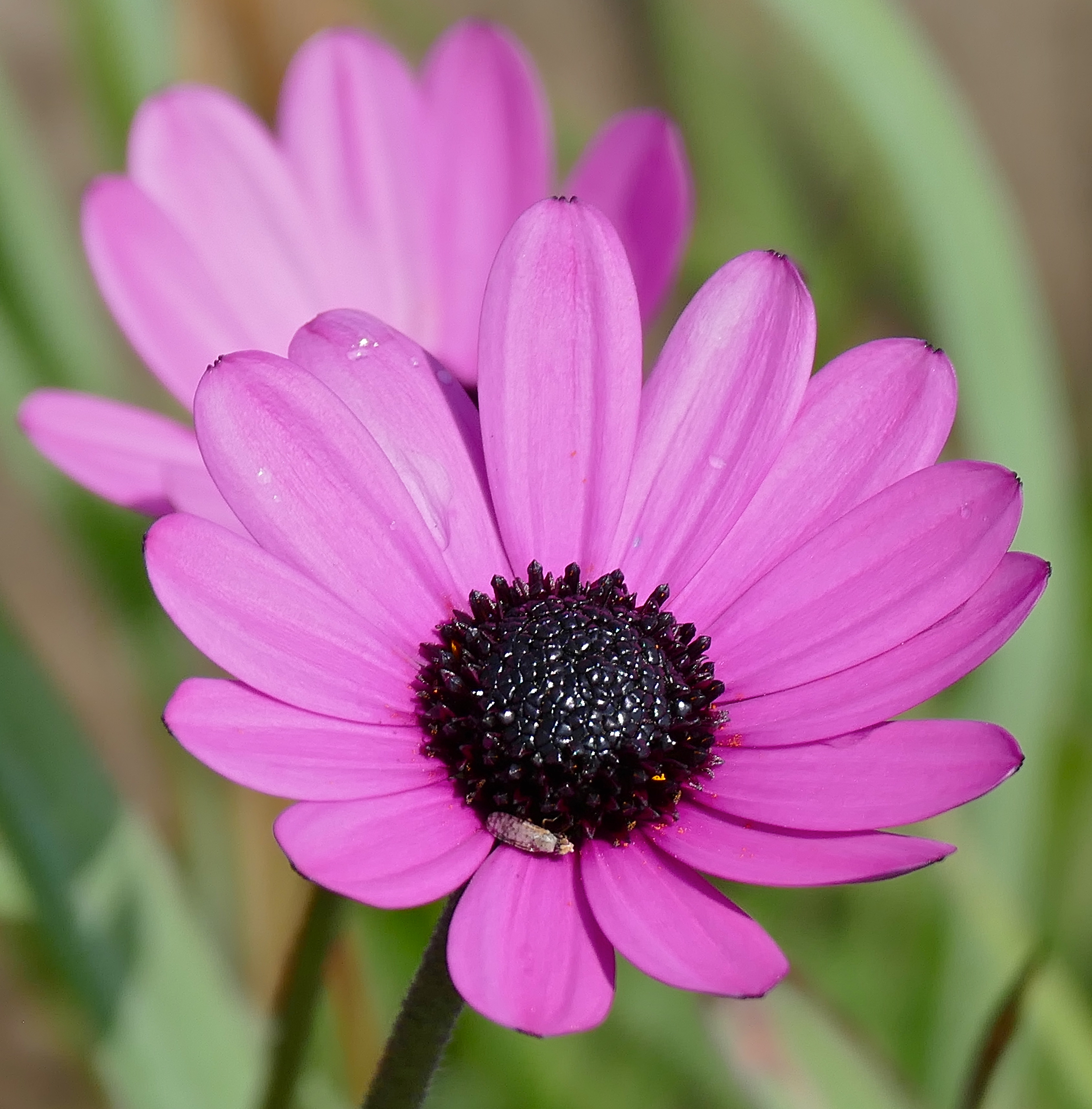
Close-up of flower in the wild in Africa
