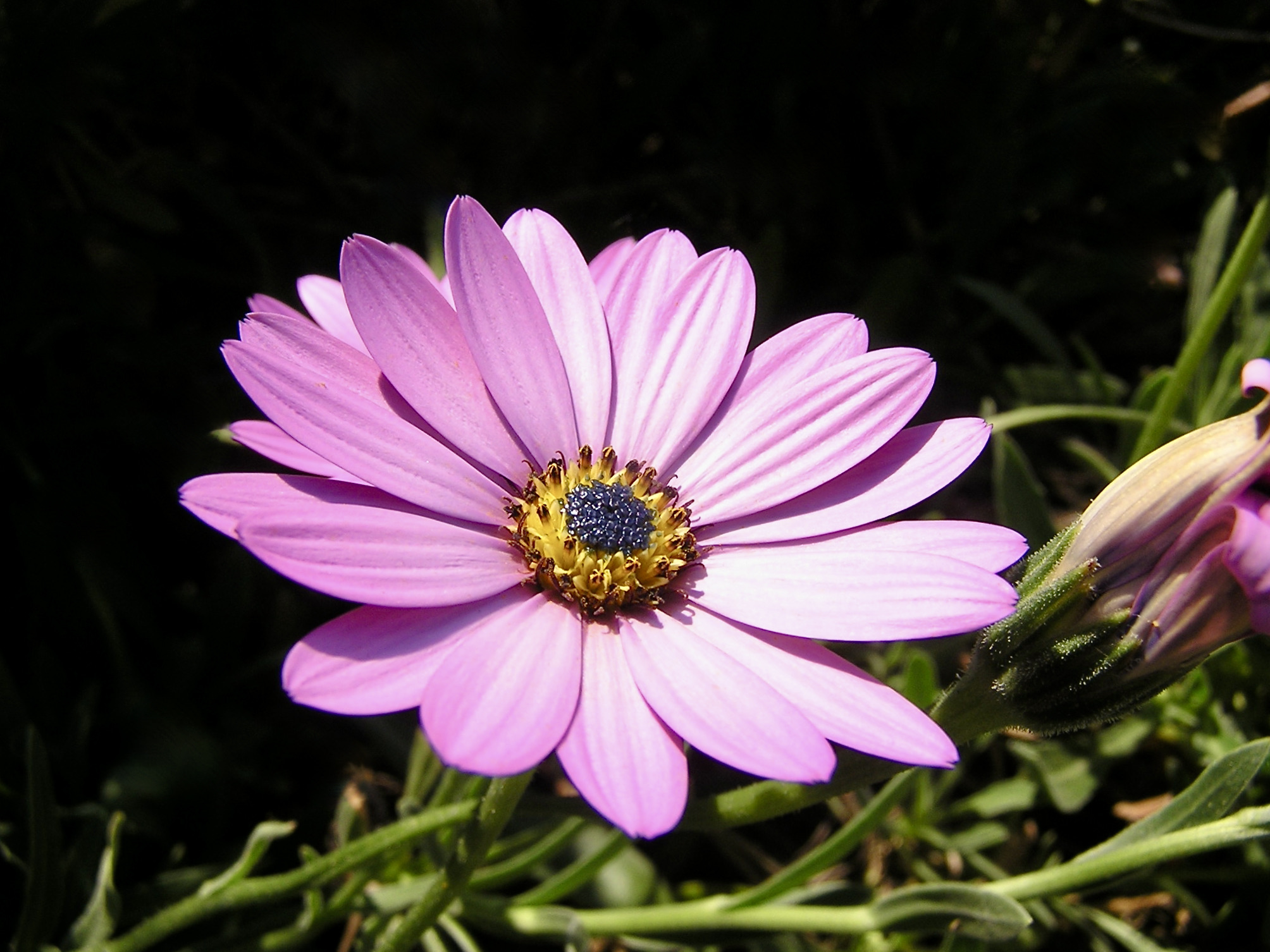

Scientific classification
- Kingdom: Plantae
- Clade: Tracheophytes
- Clade: Angiosperms
- Clade: Eudicots
- Clade: Asterids
- Order: Asterales
- Family: Asteraceae
- Genus: Dimorphotheca
- Species: D. barberae

Binomial name
- Dimorphotheca barberae Harv.

Synonyms
- Dimorphotheca lilacina Regel & Herder; Osteospermum barberae (Harv.) Norl.

= Dimorphotheca barberae =

Species of flowering plant

Dimorphotheca barberae is a species of flowering plant in the family Asteraceae. The species is endemic to the Eastern Cape in South Africa.
