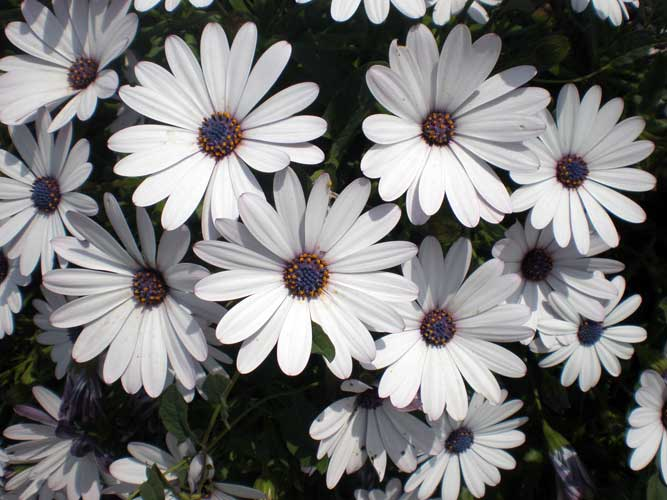

Scientific classification
- Kingdom: Plantae
- Clade: Embryophytes
- Clade: Tracheophytes
- Clade: Angiosperms
- Clade: Eudicots
- Clade: Asterids
- Order: Asterales
- Family: Asteraceae
- Genus: Dimorphotheca
- Species: D. ecklonis

Binomial name
- Dimorphotheca ecklonis DC.

Synonyms
- Osteospermum ecklonis (DC.) Norl.

= Dimorphotheca ecklonis =

Species of plant

Dimorphotheca ecklonis, also known as Cape Marguerite, African daisy, Van Staden's River daisy, Sundays River daisy, white daisy bush, blue-and-white daisy bush, star of the veldt, Kaapse magriet, jakkalsbos, Vanstadensrivier madeliefie, or Sondagsrivier madeliefie is a perennial ornamental plant that is native to South Africa. It features white ray florets and a dark blue centre and is part of the Asteraceae family. The species is named after Christian Friedrich Ecklon, a Danish botanical collector who explored the flora of the Cape in the early 1800s. It is regarded as an invasive plant in parts of Australia, particularly Victoria and Western Australia.

== Features ==
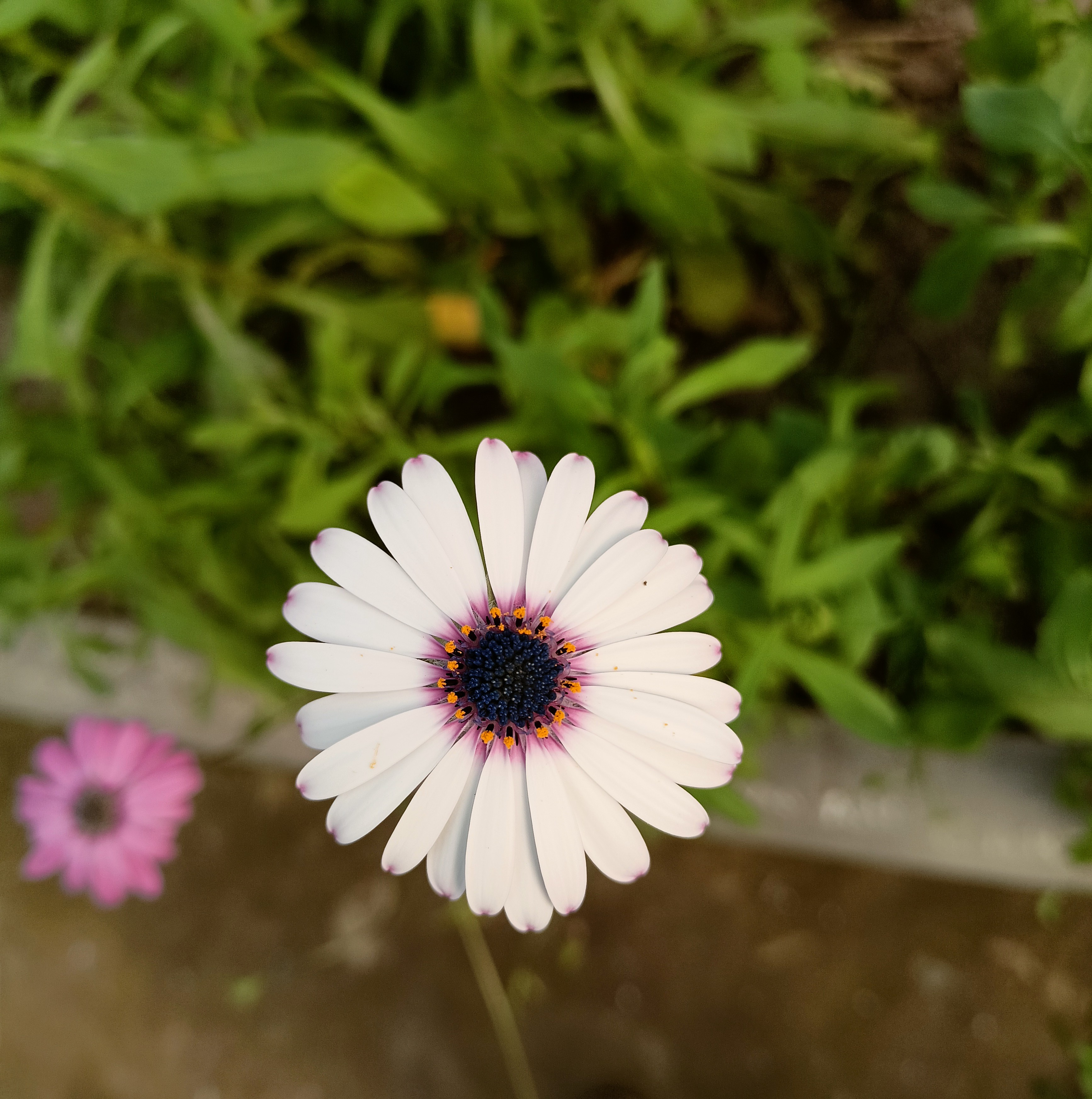
Closeup of a Cape Marguerite flower

Dimorphotheca ecklonis is an evergreen, perennial dwarf shrub that can grow up to 1 meter (3 ft 3 in) tall. The flowerheads measure up to 5 to 8 centimeters (2.0 to 3.1 in) in diameter. The leaves measure 13 to 25 by 2.5 to 10 centimeters (5.12 to 9.84 by 0.98 to 3.94 in) and are glandular fluffy, sessile, elliptical, slightly succulent, narrow obovate, and entire or serrated. The heads are on 15 to 20 centimeters (5.9 to 7.9 in) long stems and have a diameter of 5 to 8 centimeters (2.0 to 3.1 in). The bracts are 13 to 16 millimeters (0.51 to 0.63 in) long and glandular. The rays are white above and reddish blue below. The disc is dark blue or purple. The fruit surface is net-wrinkled.

The plant contains hydrocyanic acid, making it poisonous to livestock, such as cattle, and pets, such as rabbits and rodents.

The plant is a useful model organism for experiments because of traits such as the ability to grow quickly and all year round. It can also be used as a UV indicator because it is phototropic and sensitive to radiation.

== Distribution ==
When found naturally the plants can be seen growing at the base of cliffs or on steep hills. It is native to a small area in the Eastern Cape, South Africa, around Uitenhage and Humansdorp and is found on wet grass and in river beds at altitudes up to 300 meters (980 ft). It prefers subtropic biomes but has been introduced into the Azores, California, Mauritius, New South Wales, Queensland, Réunion, Spain, Tunisia, Victoria, and Western Australia. It has become popular in Europe in places such as Sicily, Italy.

== Cultivation and Propagation ==
Dimorphotheca ecklonis can be grown as a perennial but based on the temperature swings of the local climate it can be grown as an annual plant. The peak flowering period is in spring, although some flowers will last through summer. The plants grow fast and thrive best in full sun, in poor to moderately fertile, well-drained, sandy soil.

It is widely used as an ornamental plant in pots and beddings. In places, such as Australia, where it has become invasive the white coloured flowers grow as groundcover plants.

New plants can be cultivated from seeds or cuttings. The plants should be propagated by seed in spring at cooler temperatures (18°C). It is recommended that the seeds, which germinate easily, are planted 15 to 25 centimeters (5.9 to 9.8 in) from one another. For propagation via cuttings, softwood cuttings should be taken in late spring and semi-ripe cuttings should be taken in late summer.

== Bibliography ==
- Pink, A. (2004). Gardening for the Million. Project Gutenberg Literary Archive Foundation.
