= Bulbophyllum sect. Pelma =

Scientific classification
- Kingdom: Plantae
- Clade: Tracheophytes
- Clade: Angiosperms
- Clade: Monocots
- Order: Asparagales
- Family: Orchidaceae
- Subfamily: Epidendroideae
- Genus: Bulbophyllum
- Section: Bulbophyllum sect. Pelma [Finet] Schlechter 1913

Type species
- Bulbophyllum absconditum

Species
- See text

Section of flowering plants

Bulbophyllum sect. Pelma is a section of the genus Bulbophyllum.

== Description ==
Species in this section have creeping rhizome with one or more flowers

== Distribution ==
Plants from this section are found in New Guinea, the Philippines, Sulawesi, Samoa, Fiji and Vanuatu .

== Species ==
Bulbophyllum section Pelma comprises the following species:

Image	Name	Distribution	Elevation (m)
	Bulbophyllum absconditum J.J.Sm. 1905	Bali, Java and Sumatra, New Caledonia and Vanuatu	100–1,900 metres (330–6,230 ft)
	Bulbophyllum ankylorhinon J.J.Verm. 1992	Papua New Guinea	1,700–2,000 metres (5,600–6,600 ft)
	Bulbophyllum argoxanthum J.J.Verm. 2008	Papua New Guinea	
	Bulbophyllum bacilliferum J.J.Sm. 1928	the Moluccas, New Guinea and the Solomon Islands	400–800 metres (1,300–2,600 ft)
	Bulbophyllum colliferum J.J.Sm. 1911	New Guinea	400–1,200 metres (1,300–3,900 ft)
	Bulbophyllum fractiflexum J.J.Sm. 1908	Papuan and New Guinea and Solomon Island	0–2,000 metres (0–6,562 ft)
	Bulbophyllum gyaloglossum J.J.Verm. 1993	New Guinea	2,400–2,600 metres (7,900–8,500 ft)
	Bulbophyllum latipes J.J.Sm. 1935	New Guinea	900 metres (3,000 ft)
	Bulbophyllum leptoleucum Schltr.1913	New Guinea	1,100 metres (3,600 ft)
	Bulbophyllum leucothyrsus Schltr. 1913	New Guinea	300–1,500 metres (980–4,920 ft)
	Bulbophyllum macilentum J.J.Verm. 1993	New Guinea	1,600–1,800 metres (5,200–5,900 ft)
	Bulbophyllum mesodon J.J.Verm. 1993	New Guinea	800 metres (2,600 ft)
	Bulbophyllum mischobulbon Schltr. 1913	New Guinea	2,000–3,000 metres (6,600–9,800 ft)
	Bulbophyllum ochthochilum J.J.Verm. 1993	New Guinea	1,600–1,700 metres (5,200–5,600 ft)
	Bulbophyllum oliganthum Schltr.1913	Moluccas, New Guinea and the Solomon Islands	1,000 metres (3,300 ft)
	Bulbophyllum pachytelos Schltr. 1905	Papua New Guinea	500–3,300 metres (1,600–10,800 ft)
	Bulbophyllum reductum J.J.Verm. & P.O'Byrne 2003	Sulawesi	1,100–1,200 metres (3,600–3,900 ft)
	Bulbophyllum savaiense Schltr.1911	New Guinea, the Philippines, Sulawesi, Samoa, Fiji and Vanuatu	0–3,400 metres (0–11,155 ft)
	Bulbophyllum simile Schltr. 1913	New Guinea	1,000–2,800 metres (3,300–9,200 ft)
	Bulbophyllum stipulaceum Schltr. 1905	New Guinea	1,000–1,500 metres (3,300–4,900 ft)
	Bulbophyllum tanystiche J.J.Verm. 1993	New Guinea	1,800 metres (5,900 ft)
	Bulbophyllum xanthochlamys Schltr. 1913	New Guinea	900 metres (3,000 ft)
