= Caenocara bicolor =

Scientific classification
- Kingdom: Animalia
- Phylum: Arthropoda
- Class: Insecta
- Order: Coleoptera
- Suborder: Polyphaga
- Family: Ptinidae
- Subfamily: Dorcatominae
- Tribe: Dorcatomini
- Genus: Caenocara
- Species: C. bicolor

Binomial name
- Caenocara bicolor (Germer, 1824)

Species of beetle

Caenocara bicolor is a species of desert cockroach in the beetle family Ptinidae. It is found in North America.
