= Simile (disambiguation) =

A simile is a figure of speech making an explicit comparison.

Simile or Similes may also refer to:

- A term in music
- Similes (album), by Matthew Cooper, 2010
- Simile (computer virus), a Windows virus
- SIMILE (Semantic Interoperability of Metadata and Information in unLike Environments), a project to develop semantic web tools

== See also ==
- Bulbophyllum simile, an orchid
- Caenocara simile, a puffball beetle
- Lucifuga simile, a Cuban fish
- Trillium simile, a Jeweled wakerobin
- Zygophyllum simile, an Australian herb
- Facsimile, a copy or reproduction of an original work
- Similarity (disambiguation)
- Semele (disambiguation)
- Smile (disambiguation)
