= Byrrhodes omnistrius =

Scientific classification
- Kingdom: Animalia
- Phylum: Arthropoda
- Class: Insecta
- Order: Coleoptera
- Suborder: Polyphaga
- Superfamily: Bostrichoidea
- Family: Ptinidae
- Subfamily: Dorcatominae
- Tribe: Dorcatomini
- Genus: Byrrhodes
- Species: B. omnistrius

Binomial name
- Byrrhodes omnistrius Ford, 1998

Species of beetle

Byrrhodes omnistrius is a species of beetle in the family Ptinidae.
