= Byrrhodes grandis =

Scientific classification
- Kingdom: Animalia
- Phylum: Arthropoda
- Class: Insecta
- Order: Coleoptera
- Suborder: Polyphaga
- Family: Ptinidae
- Subfamily: Dorcatominae
- Tribe: Dorcatomini
- Genus: Byrrhodes
- Species: B. grandis

Binomial name
- Byrrhodes grandis White, 1973

Species of beetle

Byrrhodes grandis is a species of beetle in the family Ptinidae.
