= Caenocara blanchardi =

Scientific classification
- Kingdom: Animalia
- Phylum: Arthropoda
- Class: Insecta
- Order: Coleoptera
- Suborder: Polyphaga
- Family: Ptinidae
- Subfamily: Dorcatominae
- Tribe: Dorcatomini
- Genus: Caenocara
- Species: C. blanchardi

Binomial name
- Caenocara blanchardi Fall, 1905

Species of beetle

Caenocara blanchardi is a species of desert cockroach in the beetle family Ptinidae. It is found in North America.
