= Byrrhodes setosus =

Scientific classification
- Kingdom: Animalia
- Phylum: Arthropoda
- Class: Insecta
- Order: Coleoptera
- Suborder: Polyphaga
- Superfamily: Bostrichoidea
- Family: Ptinidae
- Subfamily: Dorcatominae
- Tribe: Dorcatomini
- Genus: Byrrhodes
- Species: B. setosus

Binomial name
- Byrrhodes setosus LeConte, 1878

Species of beetle

Byrrhodes setosus is a species of beetle in the family Ptinidae.
