= Byrrhodes levisternus =

Scientific classification
- Kingdom: Animalia
- Phylum: Arthropoda
- Clade: Pancrustacea
- Class: Insecta
- Order: Coleoptera
- Suborder: Polyphaga
- Family: Ptinidae
- Tribe: Dorcatomini
- Genus: Byrrhodes
- Species: B. levisternus

Binomial name
- Byrrhodes levisternus (Fall, 1905)

Species of beetle

Byrrhodes levisternus is a species of beetle in the family Ptinidae. It is found in North America.
