= Byrrhodes =

Scientific classification
- Kingdom: Animalia
- Phylum: Arthropoda
- Class: Insecta
- Order: Coleoptera
- Suborder: Polyphaga
- Family: Ptinidae
- Tribe: Dorcatomini
- Genus: Byrrhodes; LeConte, 1878

Synonyms
- Eutylistus Gorham, 1886; Notiotheca Fall, 1905; Priotoma Brethes, 1923

Genus of beetles

Byrrhodes is a genus of death-watch and spider beetles in the family Ptinidae. There are about 14 described species in Byrrhodes.

== Species ==
These 14 species belong to the genus Byrrhodes:

- Byrrhodes facilis (Fall, 1905)^{i c g b}
- Byrrhodes fallax (Fall, 1905)^{i c g}
- Byrrhodes grandis White, 1973^{i c g}
- Byrrhodes granus (LeConte, 1878)^{i c g b}
- Byrrhodes incomptus (LeConte, 1865)^{i c g b}
- Byrrhodes intermedius (LeConte, 1878)^{i c g b}
- Byrrhodes levisternus (Fall, 1905)^{i c g b}
- Byrrhodes omnistrius Ford, 1998^{i c g}
- Byrrhodes ovatus White, 1981^{i c g}
- Byrrhodes setosus LeConte, 1878^{i c g}
- Byrrhodes tomokunii Sakai, 1996^{g}
- Byrrhodes tristiatus (LeConte, 1878)^{i c g}
- Byrrhodes tristriatus^{b}
- Byrrhodes ulkei (Fall, 1905)^{i c g}

Data sources: i = ITIS, c = Catalogue of Life, g = GBIF, b = Bugguide.net
