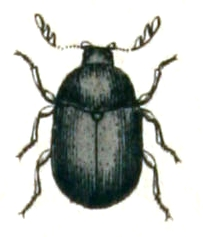

Scientific classification
- Kingdom: Animalia
- Phylum: Arthropoda
- Class: Insecta
- Order: Coleoptera
- Suborder: Polyphaga
- Family: Ptinidae
- Genus: Dorcatoma
- Species: D. dresdensis

Binomial name
- Dorcatoma dresdensis Herbst, 1792

= Dorcatoma dresdensis =

Species of beetle

Dorcatoma dresdensis is a species of beetle in the family Ptinidae.

Like others of its genus, this beetle lives in dead wood infested with fungi. It has been noted on several species, including Fomes fomentarius on birch and alder wood, Inonotus radiatus on alder and hazel and Inonotus rheades on aspen, Ganoderma applanatum on lime wood, and many species of Phellinus.

This species was first recorded as being present in Northern Ireland in 2009.
