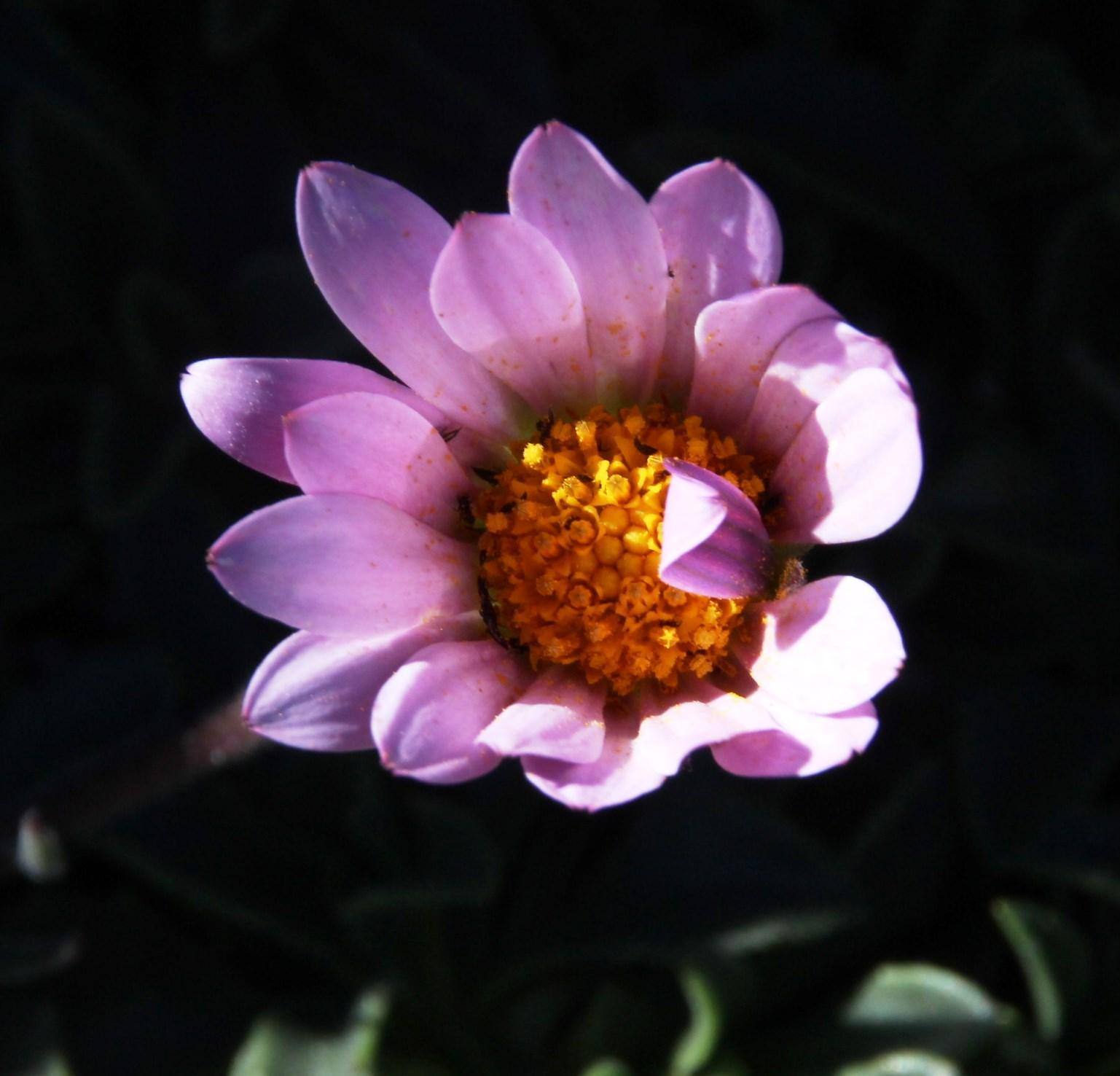

Scientific classification
- Kingdom: Plantae
- Clade: Tracheophytes
- Clade: Angiosperms
- Clade: Eudicots
- Clade: Asterids
- Order: Asterales
- Family: Asteraceae
- Genus: Dimorphotheca
- Species: D. venusta

Binomial name
- Dimorphotheca venusta (Norl.) Norl., (1980)

Synonyms
- Dimorphotheca montana var. venusta Norl.

= Dimorphotheca venusta =

Species of flowering plant

Dimorphotheca venusta is a plant belonging to the genus Dimorphotheca. The species is endemic to the Western Cape and occurs in the Wemmershoek, Du Toitskloof and Hexrivier mountains at altitudes of 600 - 1,800 m. The plant is considered rare. The species was described by Nils Tycho Norlindh in 1980.
