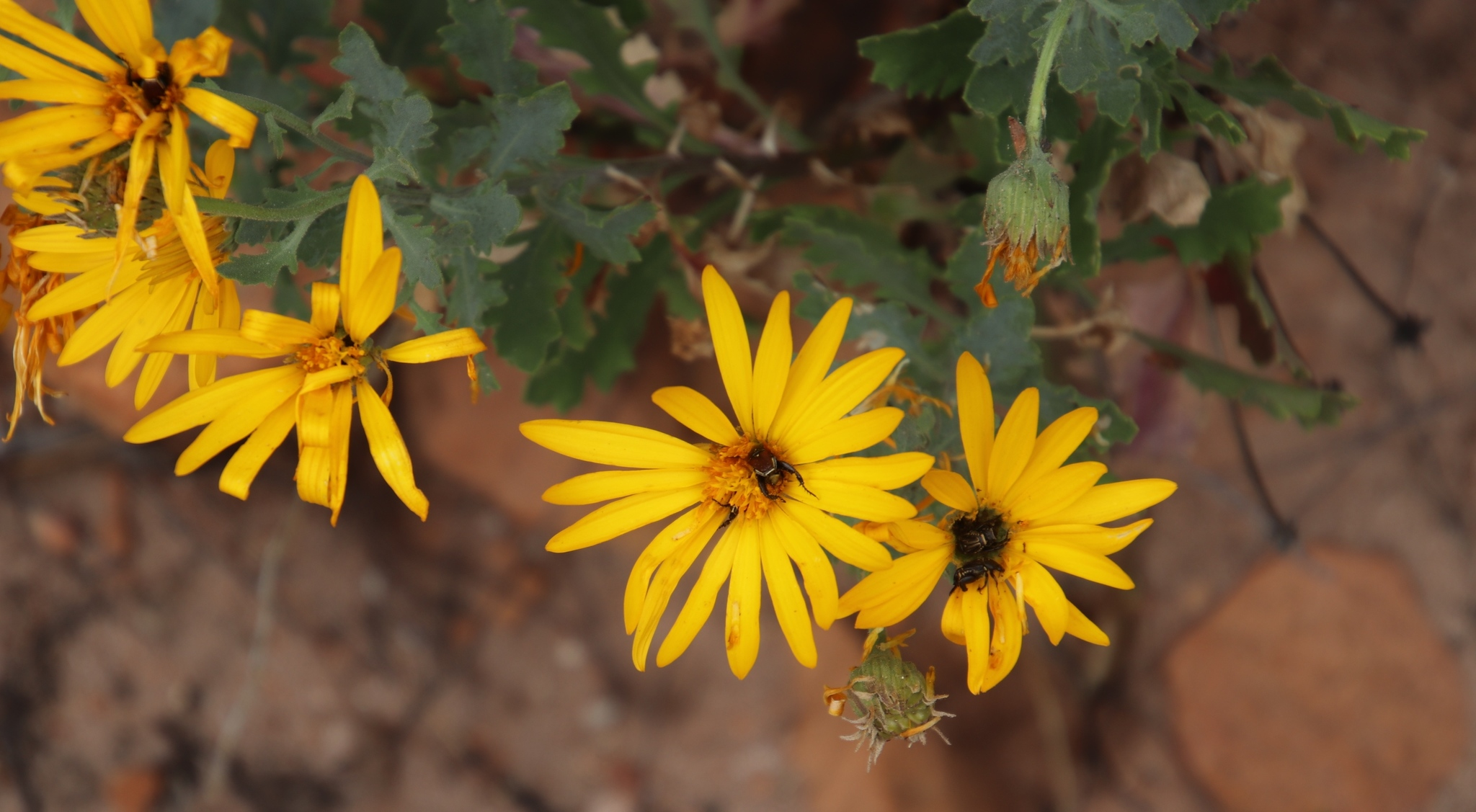

Scientific classification
- Kingdom: Plantae
- Clade: Tracheophytes
- Clade: Angiosperms
- Clade: Eudicots
- Clade: Asterids
- Order: Asterales
- Family: Asteraceae
- Genus: Dimorphotheca
- Species: D. chrysanthemifolia

Binomial name
- Dimorphotheca chrysanthemifolia (Vent.) DC., (1838)

Synonyms
- Arnoldia aurea Cass.; Arnoldia chrysanthemifolia (Vent.) Steud.; Arnoldia ventenatiana C.Presl; Calendula chrysanthemifolia Vent.; Dimorphotheca chrysanthemoides Harv.; Osteospermum floridum E.Mey. ex DC.; Osteospermum grandiflorum Sims

= Dimorphotheca chrysanthemifolia =

Species of flowering plant

Dimorphotheca chrysanthemifolia is a plant belonging to the genus Dimorphotheca. The species is endemic to the Western Cape.
