= Cryptoramorphus floridanus =

Scientific classification
- Kingdom: Animalia
- Phylum: Arthropoda
- Class: Insecta
- Order: Coleoptera
- Suborder: Polyphaga
- Family: Ptinidae
- Genus: Cryptoramorphus
- Species: C. floridanus

Binomial name
- Cryptoramorphus floridanus White, 1966

Species of beetle

Cryptoramorphus floridanus is a species of beetle in the family Ptinidae.
