= Dorcatoma flavicornis =

Scientific classification
- Kingdom: Animalia
- Phylum: Arthropoda
- Clade: Pancrustacea
- Class: Insecta
- Order: Coleoptera
- Suborder: Polyphaga
- Family: Ptinidae
- Genus: Dorcatoma
- Species: D. flavicornis

Binomial name
- Dorcatoma flavicornis (Fabricius, 1793)

Species of beetle

Dorcatoma flavicornis is a species of beetle in the family Ptinidae.
