= Caenocara affine =

Scientific classification
- Kingdom: Animalia
- Phylum: Arthropoda
- Clade: Pancrustacea
- Class: Insecta
- Order: Coleoptera
- Suborder: Polyphaga
- Family: Ptinidae
- Genus: Caenocara
- Species: C. affine

Binomial name
- Caenocara affine (Boheman, 1858)

Species of beetle

Caenocara affine is a species of anobiid beetle in the family Anobiidae. It is found in North America and Europe.
