= Dorcatoma ambjoerni =

Scientific classification
- Kingdom: Animalia
- Phylum: Arthropoda
- Class: Insecta
- Order: Coleoptera
- Suborder: Polyphaga
- Family: Ptinidae
- Genus: Dorcatoma
- Species: D. ambjoerni

Binomial name
- Dorcatoma ambjoerni Baranowski, 1985

Species of beetle

Dorcatoma ambjoerni is a species of beetle in the family Ptinidae.
