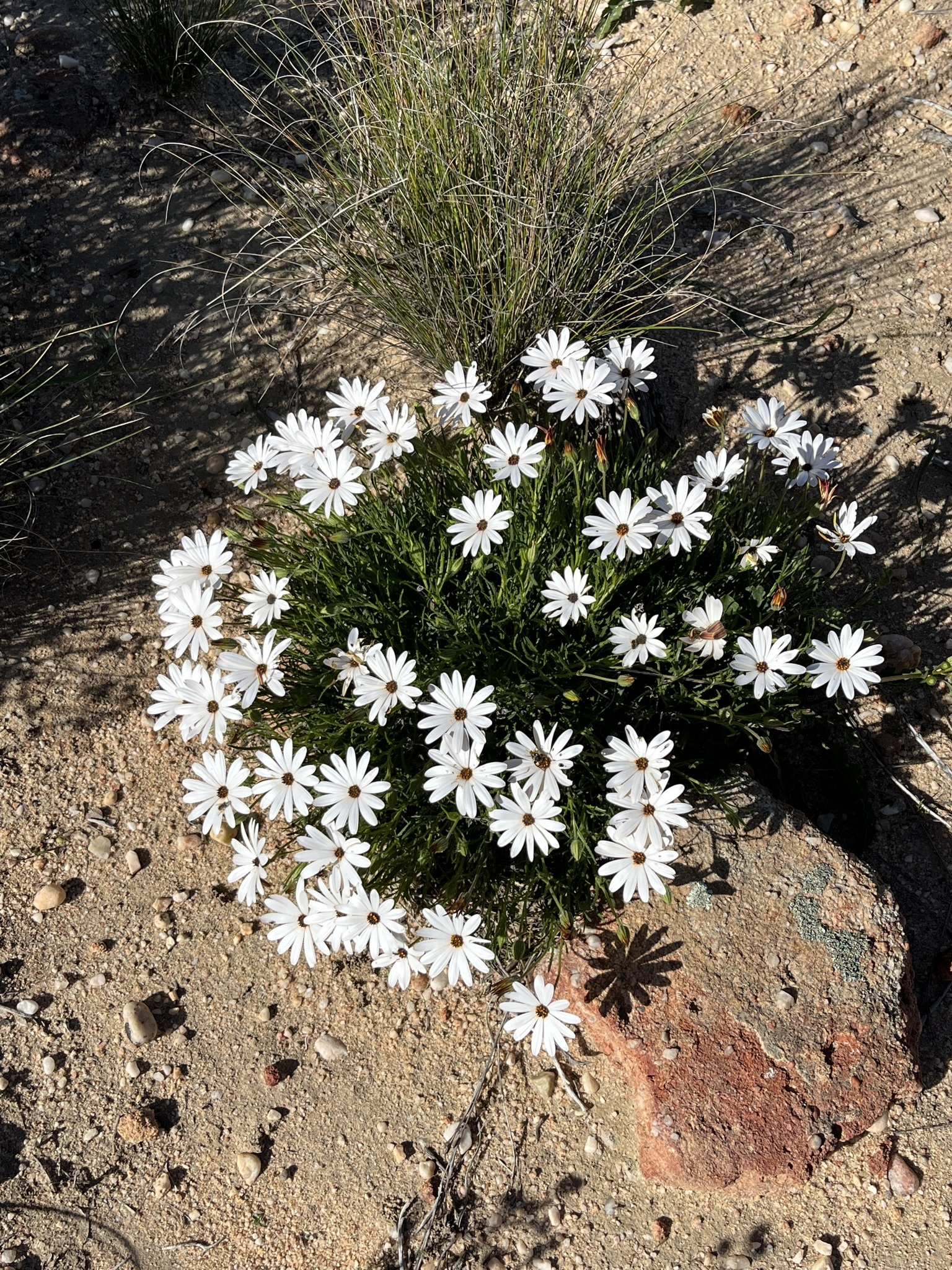

Scientific classification
- Kingdom: Plantae
- Clade: Tracheophytes
- Clade: Angiosperms
- Clade: Eudicots
- Clade: Asterids
- Order: Asterales
- Family: Asteraceae
- Genus: Dimorphotheca
- Species: D. dregei

Binomial name
- Dimorphotheca dregei DC.

Synonyms
- Osteospermum dregei (DC.) Norl.

= Dimorphotheca dregei =

Species of plant

Dimorphotheca dregei, or bietou, is a species of plant from South Africa.

== Description ==
This tufted perennial grows to be up to 20 cm (7.9 in) tall from a woody base. It has strongly toothed linear leaves.

flowers are most common in August and September. Solitary radiate flowers grow on long stems. The flowers are purple with white rays that are brown on the bottom. The disc florest are sterile. The triangular achenes (small, dry fruit that contain a single seed) are small with small bumps and round toothed margins.

== Distribution and habitat ==
This species is endemic to the Western Cape of South Africa. It grows on sandstone slopes between the Bokkeveld Mountains, Bredasdorp, and Klein Swartberg.
