= Petalium bistriatum =

Scientific classification
- Kingdom: Animalia
- Phylum: Arthropoda
- Class: Insecta
- Order: Coleoptera
- Suborder: Polyphaga
- Family: Ptinidae
- Genus: Petalium
- Species: P. bistriatum

Binomial name
- Petalium bistriatum (Say, 1825)

Species of beetle

Petalium bistriatum is a species of beetle in the family Ptinidae. It is found in North America.

== Subspecies ==
These four subspecies belong to the species Petalium bistriatum:

- Petalium bistriatum arizonense Fall
- Petalium bistriatum bicolor Fall
- Petalium bistriatum bistriatum
- Petalium bistriatum debile Fall
