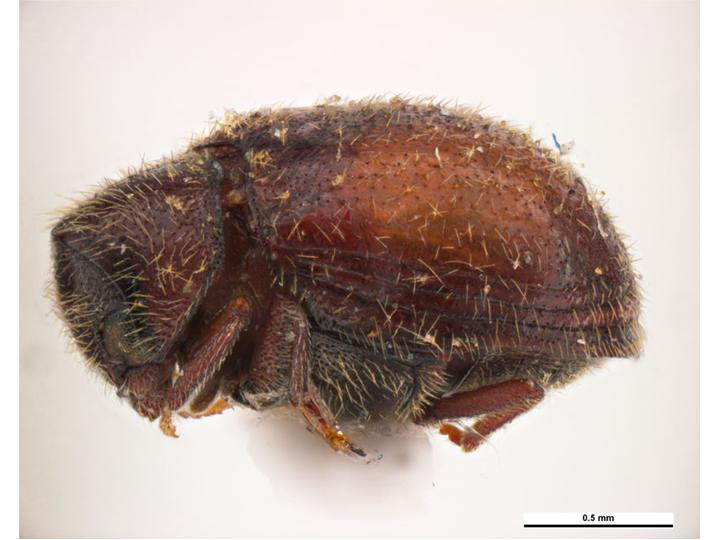
- Caenocara discoidale

Scientific classification
- Kingdom: Animalia
- Phylum: Arthropoda
- Class: Insecta
- Order: Coleoptera
- Suborder: Polyphaga
- Family: Ptinidae
- Tribe: Dorcatomini
- Genus: Caenocara; Thomson, 1859

= Caenocara =

Genus of beetles

Caenocara is a genus of beetles in the family Ptinidae. Members of this genus are sometimes called puffball beetles.

== Selected species ==
- Caenocara affine Boheman, 1858
- Caenocara bicolor Germar, 1824
- Caenocara blanchardi Fall, 1905
- Caenocara bovistae Hoffmann, 1803
- Caenocara californicum LeConte, 1878
- Caenocara frontale Fall, 1905
- Caenocara ineptum Fall, 1905
- Caenocara laterale LeConte, 1878
- Caenocara neomexicanum Fall, 1905
- Caenocara nigricorne Manee, 1915
- Caenocara oculata Say, 1824
- Caenocara ovale Fall, 1905
- Caenocara scymnoides LeConte, 1865
- Caenocara simile Say, 1835
- Caenocara subglobosum Mulsant & Rey, 1864
- Caenocara tenuipalpum Fall, 1905
