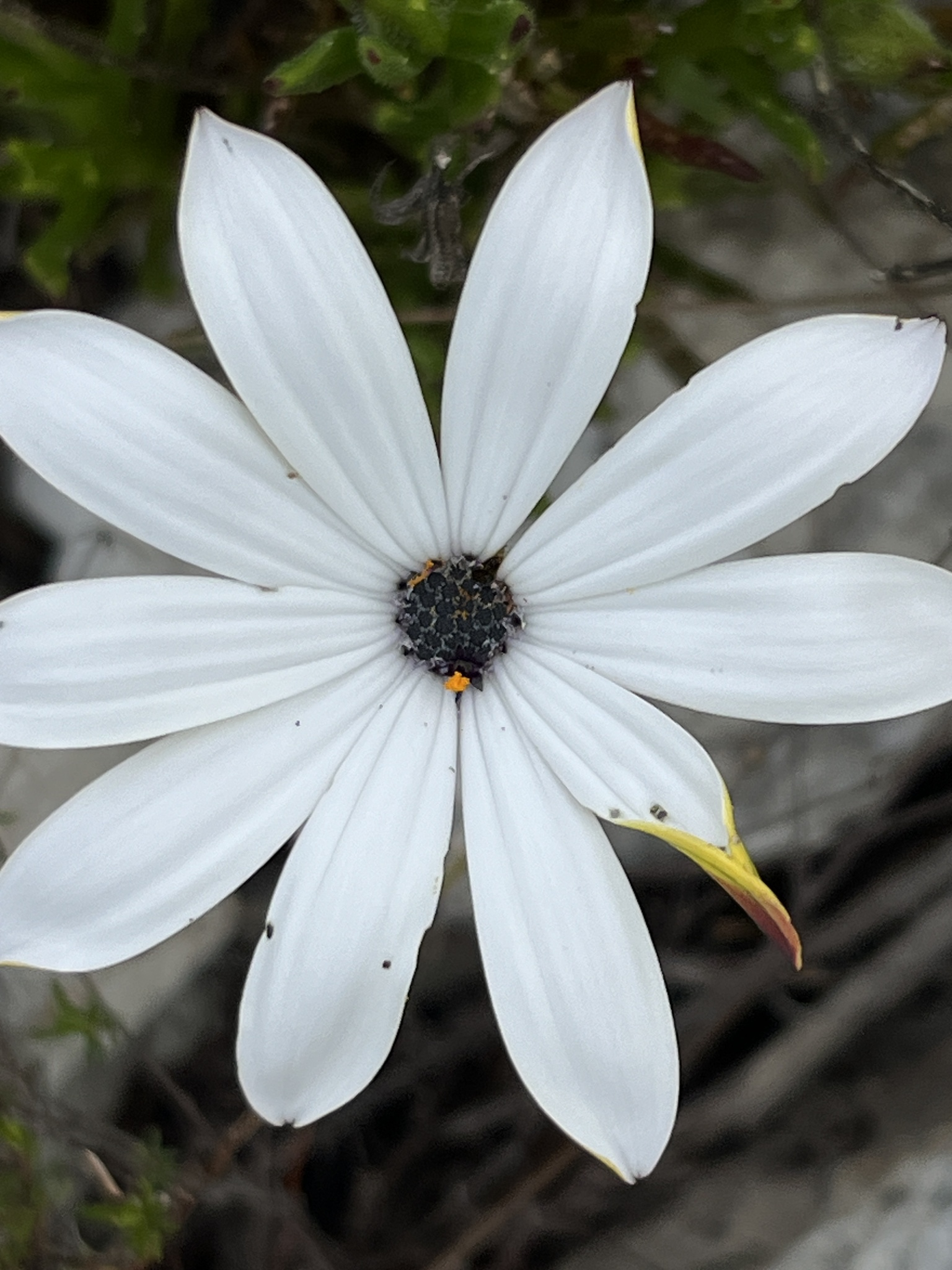

Scientific classification
- Kingdom: Plantae
- Clade: Tracheophytes
- Clade: Angiosperms
- Clade: Eudicots
- Clade: Asterids
- Order: Asterales
- Family: Asteraceae
- Genus: Dimorphotheca
- Species: D. acutifolia

Binomial name
- Dimorphotheca acutifolia Hutch.

Synonyms
- Calendula scabra P.J.Bergius; Osteospermum acutifolium (Hutch.) Norl.; Osteospermum pulchrum Norl.

= Dimorphotheca acutifolia =

Species of flowering plant

Dimorphotheca acutifolia is a plant belonging to the genus Dimorphotheca. The species is native to the Eastern and Western Cape Provinces.
