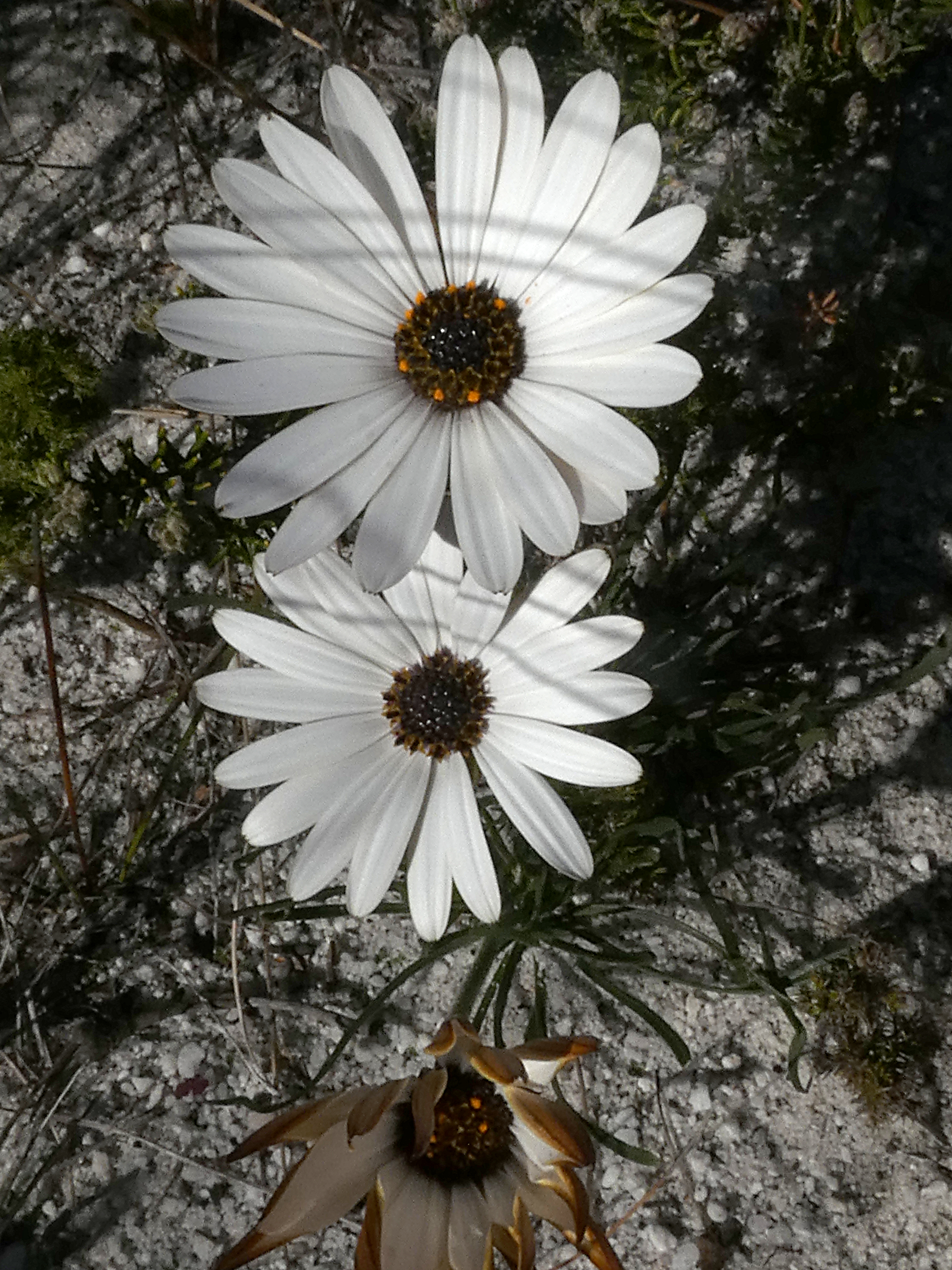

Scientific classification
- Kingdom: Plantae
- Clade: Tracheophytes
- Clade: Angiosperms
- Clade: Eudicots
- Clade: Asterids
- Order: Asterales
- Family: Asteraceae
- Genus: Dimorphotheca
- Species: D. nudicaulis

Binomial name
- Dimorphotheca nudicaulis (L.) DC. (1838)

Synonyms
- Calendula nudicaulis L.; Castalis nudicaulis (L.) Norl.

= Dimorphotheca nudicaulis =

Species of flowering plant

Dimorphotheca nudicaulis is a plant that belongs to the genus Dimorphotheca. The species is endemic to the Northern Cape and the Western Cape.
