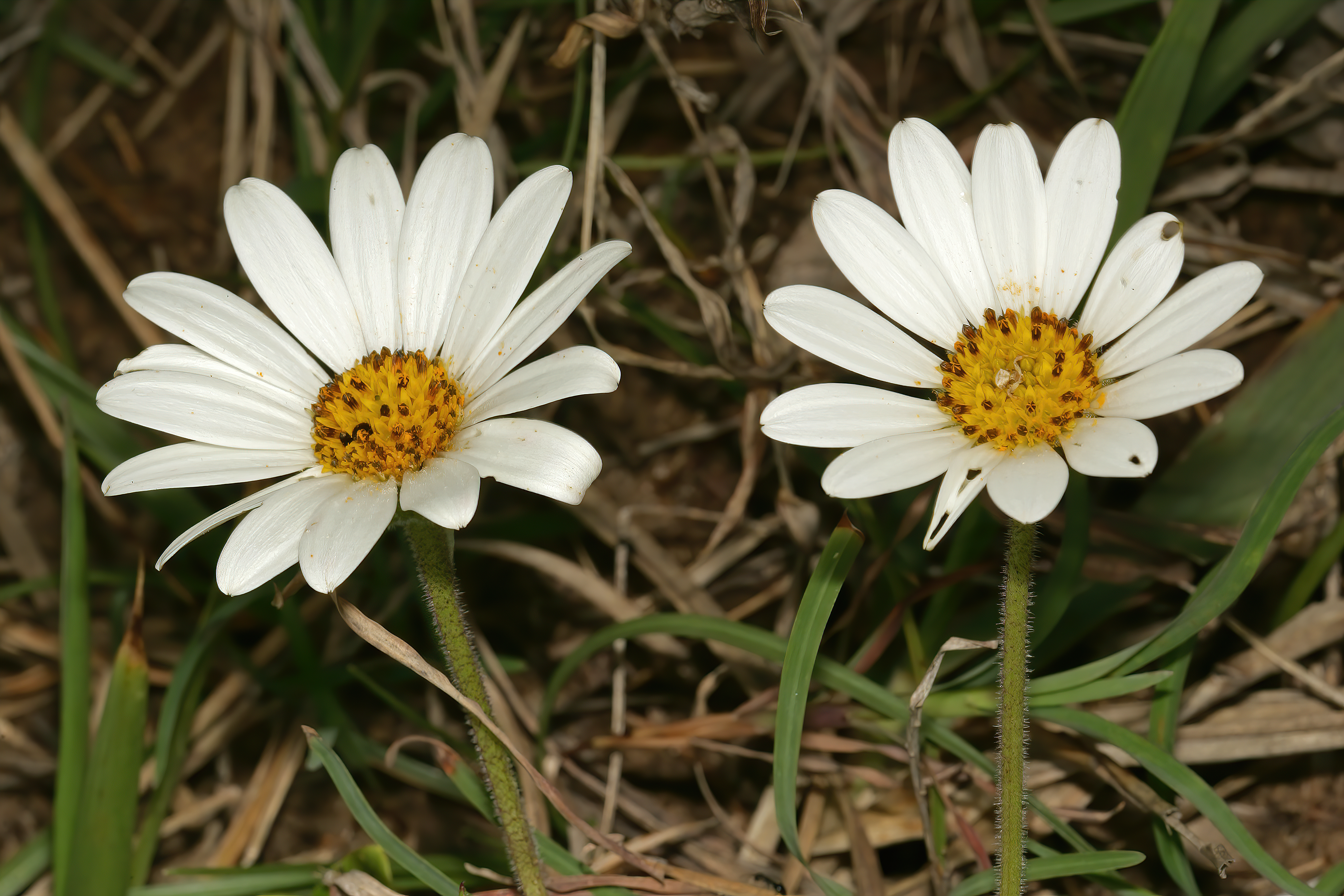

Scientific classification
- Kingdom: Plantae
- Clade: Tracheophytes
- Clade: Angiosperms
- Clade: Eudicots
- Clade: Asterids
- Order: Asterales
- Family: Asteraceae
- Genus: Dimorphotheca
- Species: D. caulescens

Binomial name
- Dimorphotheca caulescens Harv.

Synonyms
- Dimorphotheca dekindtii O.Hoffm.; Osteospermum caulescens (Harv.) Harv.

= Dimorphotheca caulescens =

Species of flowering plant

Dimorphotheca caulescens is a species of flowering plant in the family Asteraceae. The species is endemic to the Eastern Cape, Western Cape and the Free State.
