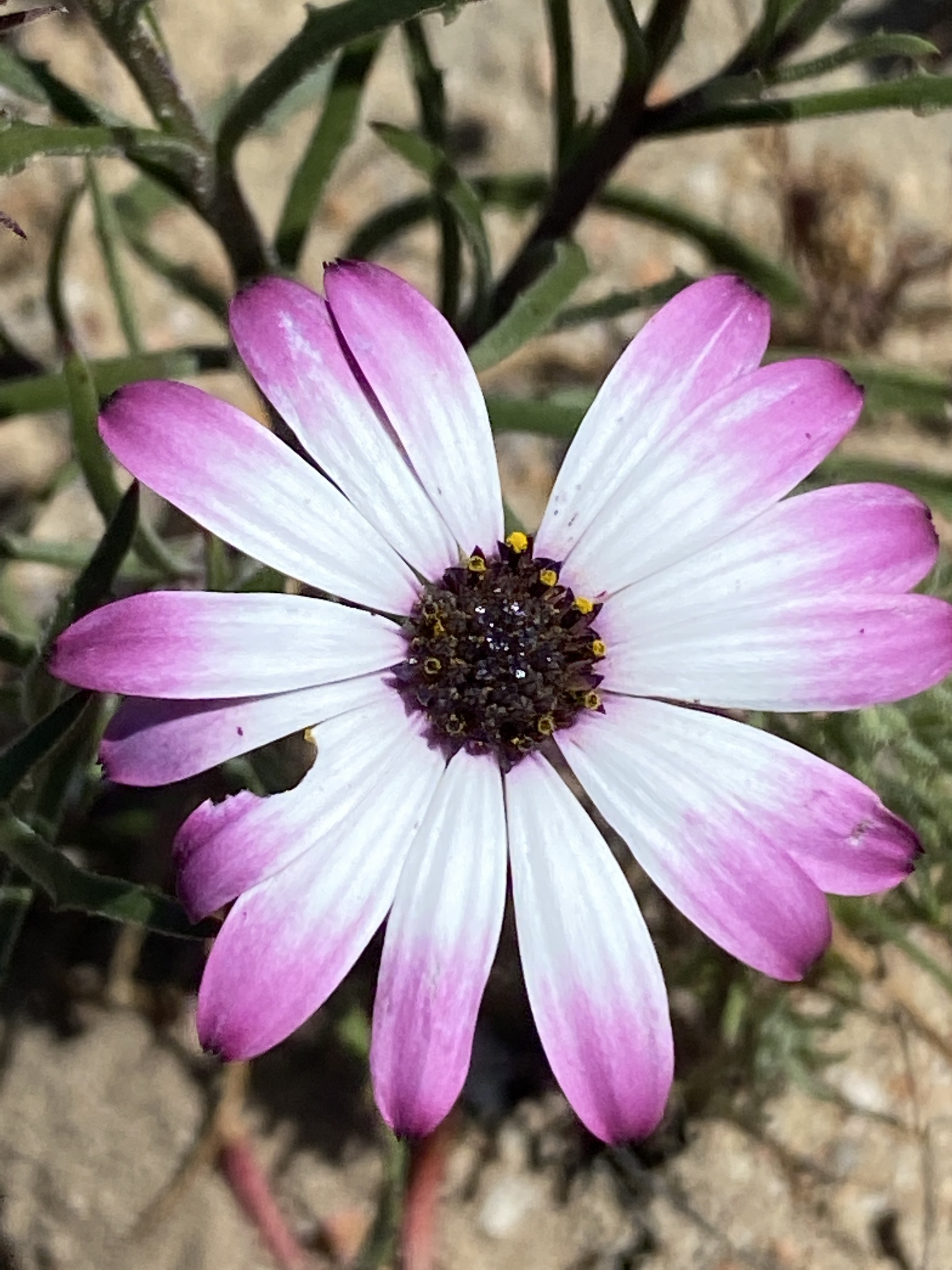

Scientific classification
- Kingdom: Plantae
- Clade: Tracheophytes
- Clade: Angiosperms
- Clade: Eudicots
- Clade: Asterids
- Order: Asterales
- Family: Asteraceae
- Genus: Dimorphotheca
- Species: D. montana

Binomial name
- Dimorphotheca montana Norl., (1943)

= Dimorphotheca montana =

Species of flowering plant

Dimorphotheca montana is a plant belonging to the genus Dimorphotheca. The species is endemic to the Western Cape.
