= Dorcatoma pallicornis =

Scientific classification
- Kingdom: Animalia
- Phylum: Arthropoda
- Class: Insecta
- Order: Coleoptera
- Suborder: Polyphaga
- Family: Ptinidae
- Genus: Dorcatoma
- Species: D. pallicornis

Binomial name
- Dorcatoma pallicornis LeConte, 1874

Synonyms
- Dorcatoma foveata White, 1960

Species of beetle

Dorcatoma pallicornis is a species of beetle in the family Ptinidae.
