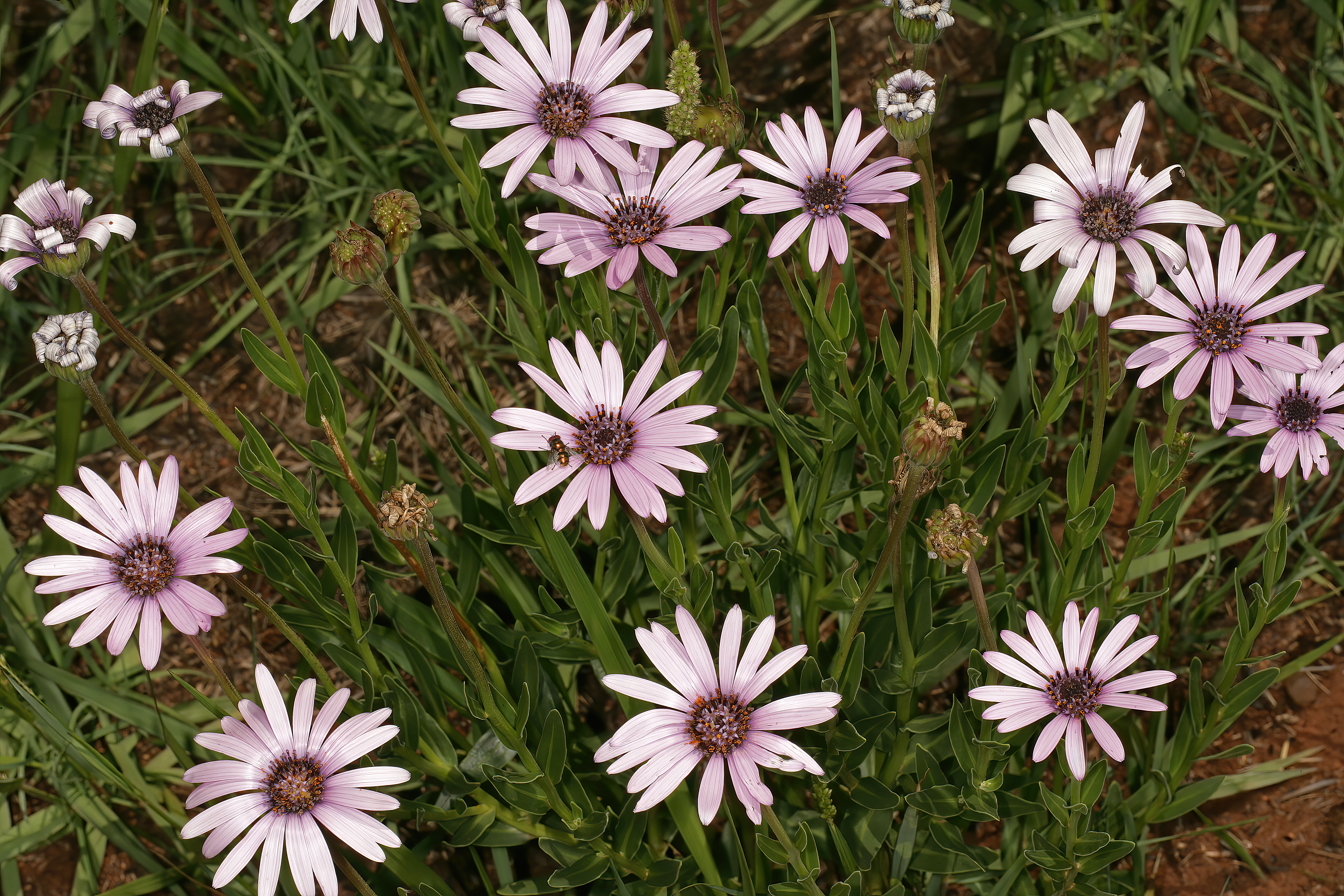

Scientific classification
- Kingdom: Plantae
- Clade: Embryophytes
- Clade: Tracheophytes
- Clade: Angiosperms
- Clade: Eudicots
- Clade: Asterids
- Order: Asterales
- Family: Asteraceae
- Genus: Dimorphotheca
- Species: D. spectabilis

Binomial name
- Dimorphotheca spectabilis Schltr. (1897)

Synonyms
- Castalis spectabilis (Schltr.) Norl.

= Dimorphotheca spectabilis =

Species of flowering plant

Dimorphotheca spectabilis is a plant that belongs to the genus Dimorphotheca. The species is endemic to KwaZulu-Natal Province of South Africa.
