= Dorcatoma moderata =

Scientific classification
- Kingdom: Animalia
- Phylum: Arthropoda
- Class: Insecta
- Order: Coleoptera
- Suborder: Polyphaga
- Family: Ptinidae
- Genus: Dorcatoma
- Species: D. moderata

Binomial name
- Dorcatoma moderata R.E.White, 1966

Species of beetle

Dorcatoma moderata is a species of beetle in the family Ptinidae.
