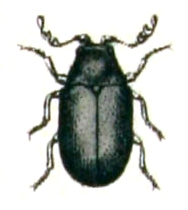
- Dorcatoma chrysomelina

Scientific classification
- Kingdom: Animalia
- Phylum: Arthropoda
- Class: Insecta
- Order: Coleoptera
- Suborder: Polyphaga
- Family: Ptinidae
- Tribe: Dorcatomini
- Genus: Dorcatoma; Herbst, 1792

= Dorcatoma =

Genus of beetles

Dorcatoma is a genus of beetles in the family Ptinidae. They are distributed in several regions of the world, excluding tropical areas. There are more than 70 species.

Beetles of this genus live in dead wood, especially that which is softened and decomposed by fungi.

Species include:

- Subgenus Dorcatoma
  - Dorcatoma dresdensis
  - Dorcatoma lomnickii
  - Dorcatoma palmi
  - Dorcatoma punctulata
  - Dorcatoma robusta
- Subgenus Pilosodorcatoma
  - Dorcatoma ambjoerni
  - Dorcatoma androgyna
  - Dorcatoma chrysomelina
  - Dorcatoma janssoni
  - Dorcatoma minor
  - Dorcatoma setosella
  - Dorcatoma substriata
- Subgenus Sternitodorcatoma
  - Dorcatoma flavicornis
- Other
  - Dorcatoma externa
  - Dorcatoma falli
  - Dorcatoma integra
  - Dorcatoma lanuginosa
  - Dorcatoma moderata
  - Dorcatoma pallicornis
  - Dorcatoma setulosa
  - Dorcatoma vaulogeri
