= Petalium schwarzi =

Scientific classification
- Kingdom: Animalia
- Phylum: Arthropoda
- Class: Insecta
- Order: Coleoptera
- Suborder: Polyphaga
- Family: Ptinidae
- Genus: Petalium
- Species: P. schwarzi

Binomial name
- Petalium schwarzi Fall, 1905

Species of beetle

Petalium schwarzi is a species of beetle in the family Ptinidae.
