= Calytheca elongata =

Scientific classification
- Kingdom: Animalia
- Phylum: Arthropoda
- Class: Insecta
- Order: Coleoptera
- Suborder: Polyphaga
- Family: Ptinidae
- Genus: Calytheca
- Species: C. elongata

Binomial name
- Calytheca elongata White, 1973

Species of beetle

Calytheca elongata is a species of beetle in the family Ptinidae.
