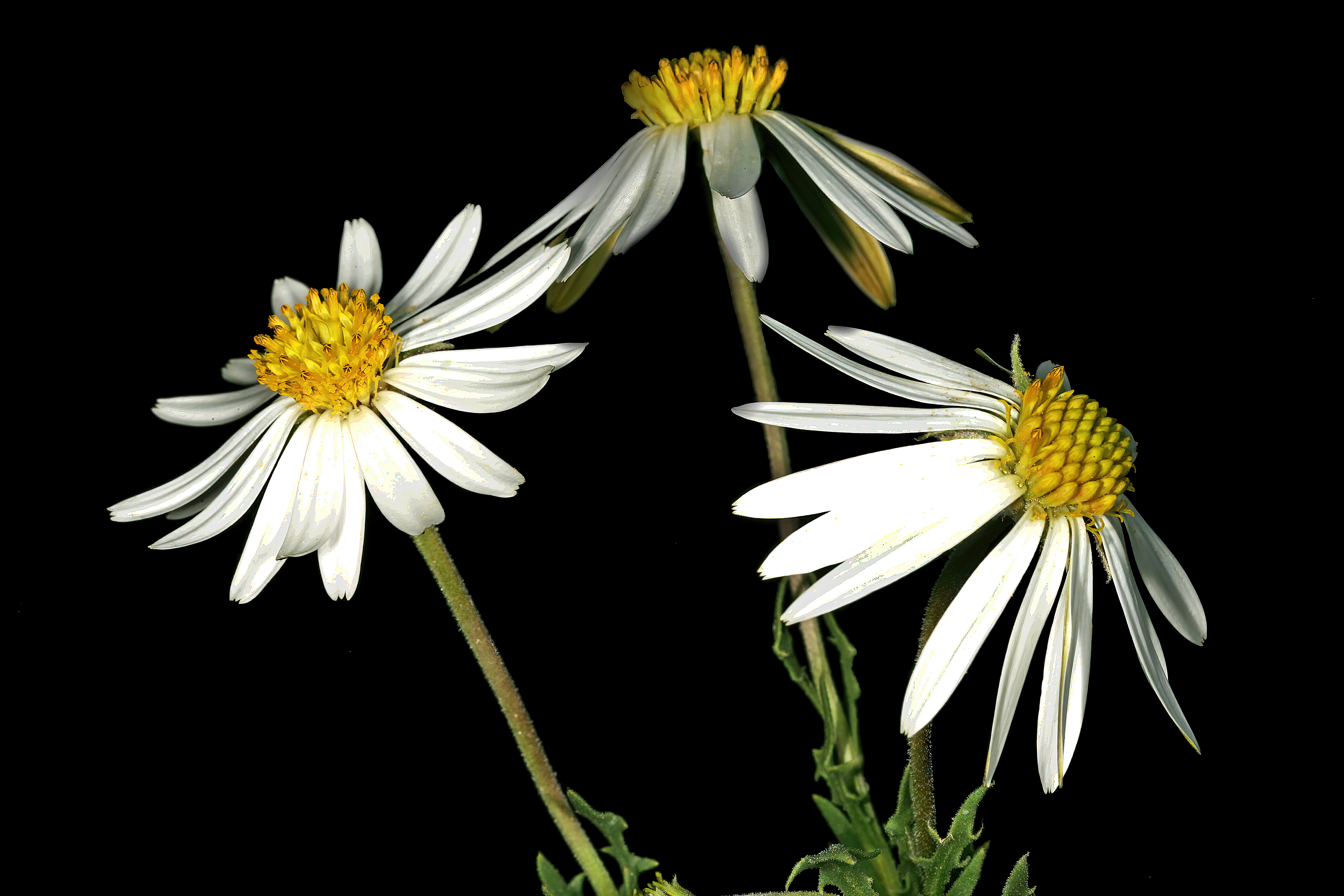

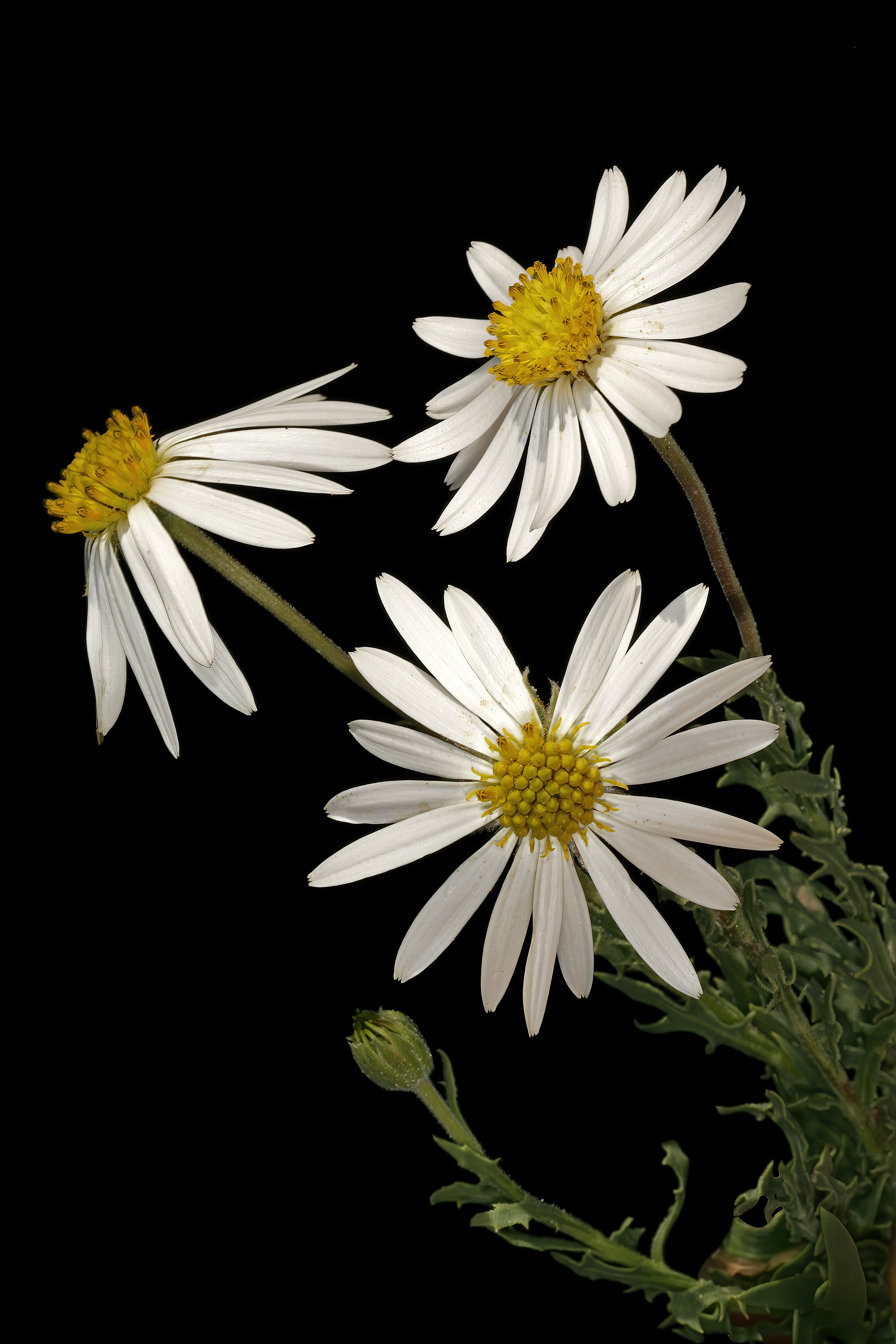

Scientific classification
- Kingdom: Plantae
- Clade: Tracheophytes
- Clade: Angiosperms
- Clade: Eudicots
- Clade: Asterids
- Order: Asterales
- Family: Asteraceae
- Genus: Dimorphotheca
- Species: D. zeyheri

Binomial name
- Dimorphotheca zeyheri Sond., (1865)

= Dimorphotheca zeyheri =

Species of flowering plant

Dimorphotheca zeyheri is a plant belonging to the genus Dimorphotheca. In South Africa, the species is native to the Northern Cape, North West, Eastern Cape, Western Cape and the Free State. It is also native to Botswana, Lesotho and Zimbabwe.
