= Dorcatoma setulosa =

Scientific classification
- Kingdom: Animalia
- Phylum: Arthropoda
- Class: Insecta
- Order: Coleoptera
- Suborder: Polyphaga
- Family: Ptinidae
- Genus: Dorcatoma
- Species: D. setulosa

Binomial name
- Dorcatoma setulosa LeConte, 1865

Species of beetle

Dorcatoma setulosa is a species of beetle belonging to the family Ptinidae.
