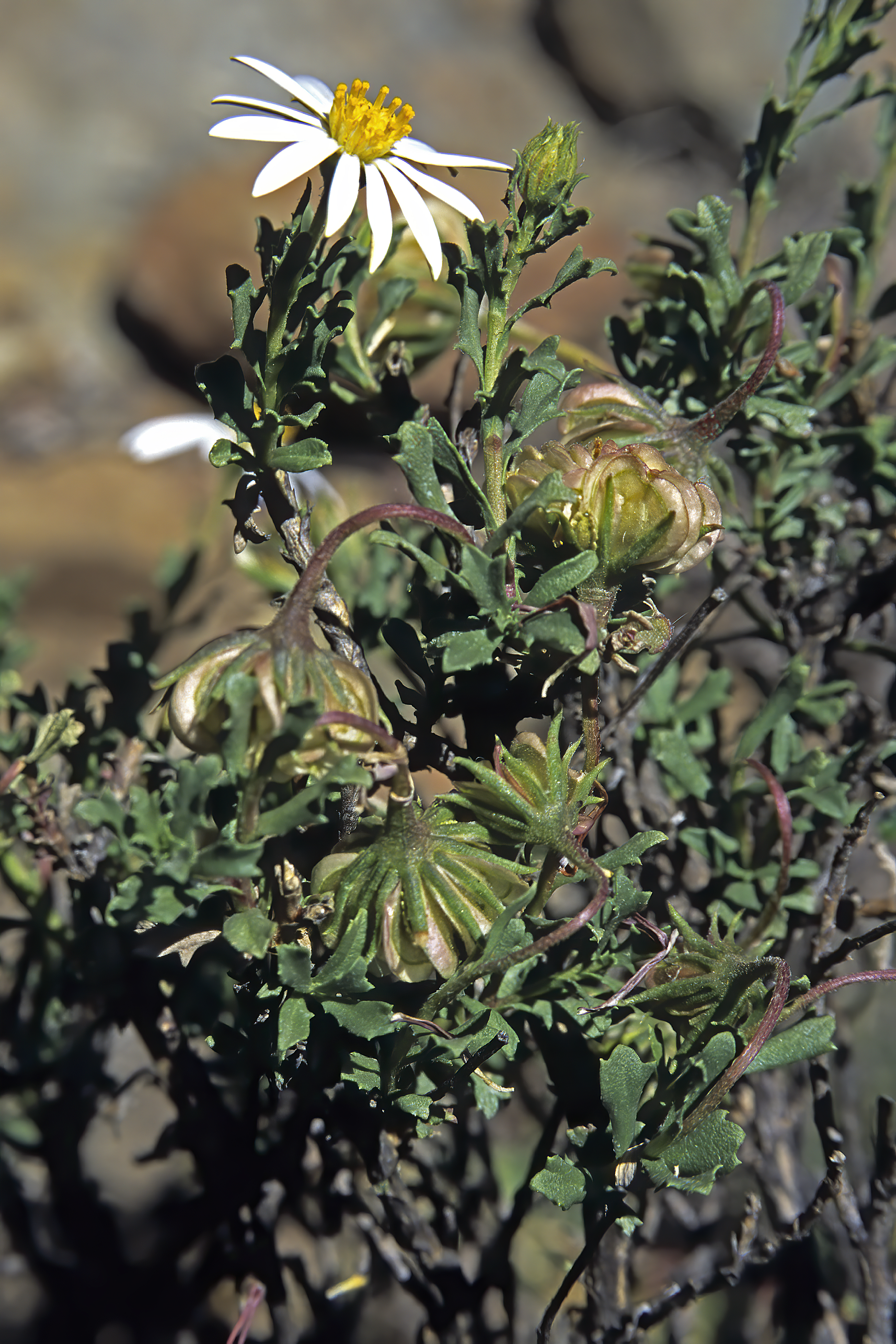

Scientific classification
- Kingdom: Plantae
- Clade: Tracheophytes
- Clade: Angiosperms
- Clade: Eudicots
- Clade: Asterids
- Order: Asterales
- Family: Asteraceae
- Genus: Dimorphotheca
- Species: D. cuneata

Binomial name
- Dimorphotheca cuneata (Thunb.) Less.

Synonyms
- Arnoldia viscosa (Andrews) Steud.; Dimorphotheca viscosa (Andrews) Druce

= Dimorphotheca cuneata =

Species of flowering plant

Dimorphotheca cuneata, the rain flower or white bietou, is a plant species native to the Cape Provinces and Free State of South Africa (Fynbos, Succulent Karoo, Nama Karoo, etc.). as well as the Botswana and Namibia. It is also widely grown as an ornamental and reportedly sparingly naturalized in Gila County in the US State of Arizona.

Dimorphotheca cuneata is a subshrub that, in its natural habitat, will grow to be 100 cm (40 inches) tall. Cultivated specimens may measure 150 cm (60 inches). Leaves are long and narrow, with a few large teeth on the edges, giving off a strong scent when crushed. Wild flower heads have white ray florets and yellow disc florets, but this can vary in garden cultivars.
