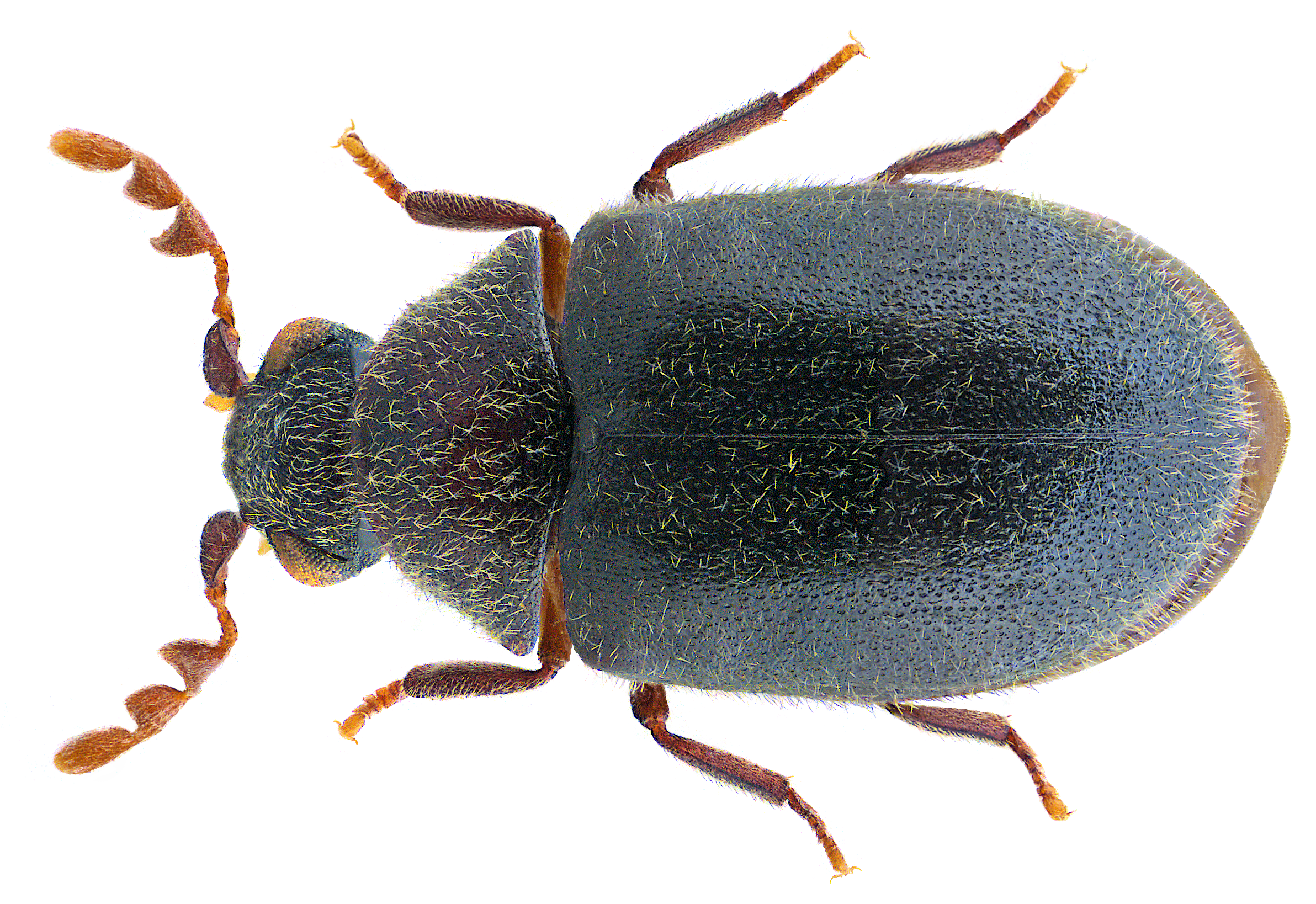

Scientific classification
- Kingdom: Animalia
- Phylum: Arthropoda
- Class: Insecta
- Order: Coleoptera
- Suborder: Polyphaga
- Family: Ptinidae
- Genus: Dorcatoma
- Species: D. chrysomelina

Binomial name
- Dorcatoma chrysomelina Sturm, 1837

= Dorcatoma chrysomelina =

Species of beetle

Dorcatoma chrysomelina is a species of beetle in the family Ptinidae. It is associated with the fungus known as crab-of-the-woods (Laetiporus sulphureus).
