= Dimorphotheca polyptera =

Scientific classification
- Kingdom: Plantae
- Clade: Tracheophytes
- Clade: Angiosperms
- Clade: Eudicots
- Clade: Asterids
- Order: Asterales
- Family: Asteraceae
- Genus: Dimorphotheca
- Species: D. polyptera

Binomial name
- Dimorphotheca polyptera DC. (1838)

Synonyms
- Osteospermum psammophilum Klatt

Species of flowering plant

Dimorphotheca polyptera is a plant belonging to the genus Dimorphotheca. The species is native to the Northern Cape, Western Cape and Namibia.
