= Dorcatoma falli =

Scientific classification
- Kingdom: Animalia
- Phylum: Arthropoda
- Class: Insecta
- Order: Coleoptera
- Suborder: Polyphaga
- Family: Ptinidae
- Genus: Dorcatoma
- Species: D. falli

Binomial name
- Dorcatoma falli White, 1965

Species of beetle

Dorcatoma falli is a species of beetle in the family Ptinidae.
