= Calytheca =

Scientific classification
- Kingdom: Animalia
- Phylum: Arthropoda
- Class: Insecta
- Order: Coleoptera
- Suborder: Polyphaga
- Superfamily: Bostrichoidea
- Family: Ptinidae
- Subfamily: Dorcatominae
- Tribe: Calymmaderini
- Genus: Calytheca; White, 1973

Genus of beetles

Calytheca is a genus of beetles in the family Ptinidae. There are at least two described species in Calytheca, C. elongata White 1973 and C. convexa White.
