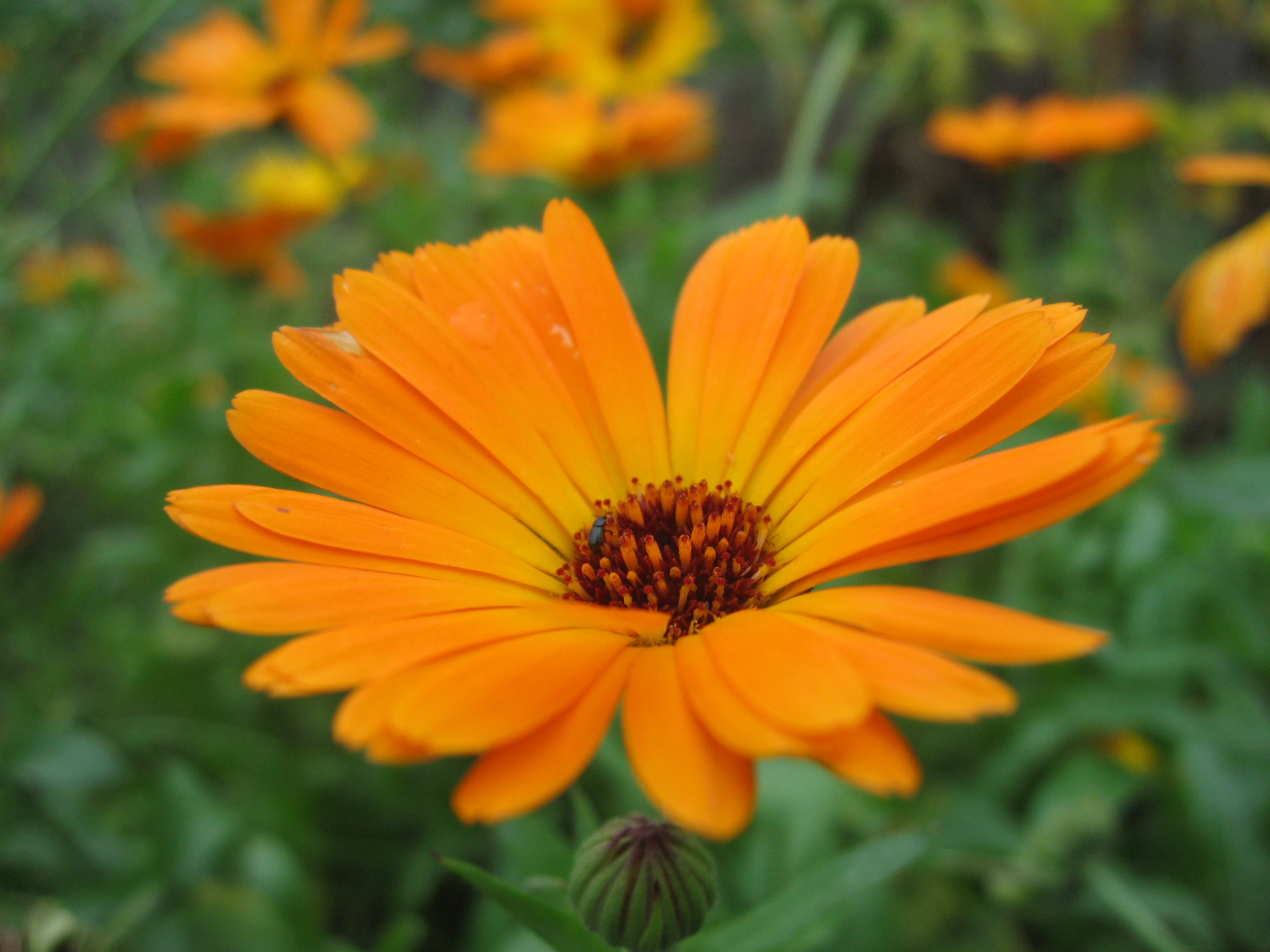

Scientific classification
- Kingdom: Plantae
- Clade: Tracheophytes
- Clade: Angiosperms
- Clade: Eudicots
- Clade: Asterids
- Order: Asterales
- Family: Asteraceae
- Genus: Dimorphotheca
- Species: D. tragus

Binomial name
- Dimorphotheca tragus (Aiton) DC. (1838)

Synonyms
- Arnoldia tragus Steud.; Calendula flaccida Vent.; Calendula tragus Aiton; Castalis flaccida (Vent.) DC.; Castalis tragus (Aiton) Norl.; Castalis ventenatii Cass.; Dimorphotheca aurantiaca DC.; Dimorphotheca flaccida (Vent.) Druce; Dimorphotheca scabra DC.

= Dimorphotheca tragus =

Species of flowering plant

Dimorphotheca tragus is a plant that belongs to the genus Dimorphotheca. The species is endemic to the Northern Cape and the Western Cape.
