= Dorcatoma integra =

Scientific classification
- Kingdom: Animalia
- Phylum: Arthropoda
- Class: Insecta
- Order: Coleoptera
- Suborder: Polyphaga
- Family: Ptinidae
- Genus: Dorcatoma
- Species: D. integra

Binomial name
- Dorcatoma integra (Fall, 1901)

Species of beetle

Dorcatoma integra is a species of beetle in the family Ptinidae.
