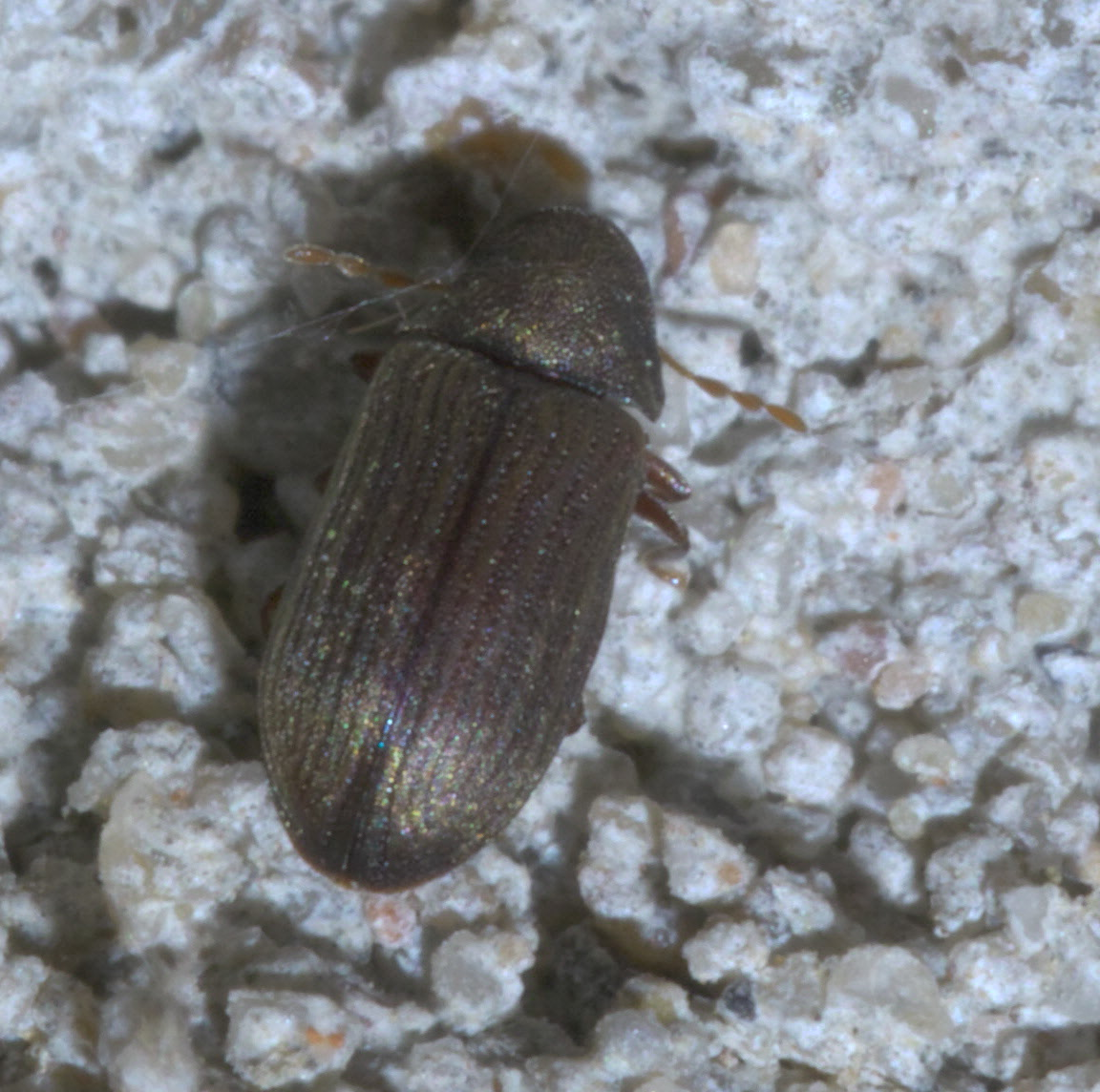

Scientific classification
- Kingdom: Animalia
- Phylum: Arthropoda
- Class: Insecta
- Order: Coleoptera
- Suborder: Polyphaga
- Superfamily: Bostrichoidea
- Family: Ptinidae
- Subfamily: Dorcatominae
- Genus: Petalium; LeConte, 1861

= Petalium =

Genus of insects

Petalium is a genus of beetles in the family Ptinidae.

== List of species ==
These 28 species belong to the genus Petalium:

- Petalium alaseriatum Ford, 1973^{i c g b}
- Petalium alternatum Ford, 1973^{i c g b}
- Petalium antillarum Pic, 1903^{g}
- Petalium arizonense Fall, 1905^{i c g}
- Petalium bicolor Fall, 1905^{i c g}
- Petalium bistriatum (Say, 1825)^{i c g b}
- Petalium brevisetum Ford, 1973^{i c g}
- Petalium californicum Fall, 1905^{i c g b}
- Petalium debile Fall, 1905^{i c g b}
- Petalium debilitatum Ford, 1973^{i c g}
- Petalium demicarinatum Ford, 1973^{i c g}
- Petalium evolutum Ford, 1973^{i c g}
- Petalium fauveli Pic, 1905^{g}
- Petalium fleutiauxi Lepesme, 1947^{g}
- Petalium globulum Ford, 1973^{i c g}
- Petalium grossum Ford, 1973^{i c g}
- Petalium incarinatum Ford, 1973^{i c g}
- Petalium incisum Ford, 1973^{i c g b}
- Petalium knulli Ford, 1973^{i c g}
- Petalium longulum Ford, 1973^{i c g}
- Petalium pici Lepesme, 1947^{g}
- Petalium punctatum Pic, 1911^{g}
- Petalium schwarzi Fall, 1905^{i c g}
- Petalium seriatum Fall, 1905^{i c g}
- Petalium uniperforatum Ford, 1973^{i c g}
- Petalium werneri Ford, 1973^{i c g}
- Petalium whitei Ford, 1973^{i c g b}
- Petalium yuccae Fall, 1905^{i c g}

Data sources: i = ITIS, c = Catalogue of Life, g = GBIF, b = Bugguide.net
