= Dimorphotheca walliana =

Scientific classification
- Kingdom: Plantae
- Clade: Tracheophytes
- Clade: Angiosperms
- Clade: Eudicots
- Clade: Asterids
- Order: Asterales
- Family: Asteraceae
- Genus: Dimorphotheca
- Species: D. walliana

Binomial name
- Dimorphotheca walliana (Norl.) B.Nord. (1994)

Synonyms
- Osteospermum wallianum Norl.

Species of flowering plant

Dimorphotheca walliana is a species of flowering plant belonging to the genus Dimorphotheca. The species is endemic to the Western Cape and occurs at Gordon's Bay at the foot of the Hottentots Holland Mountains. It has an area of occurrence of only 20 km^{2} and there are two subpopulations that are part of the fynbos. The species is threatened by coastal development.
