= Cryptoramorphus =

Scientific classification
- Kingdom: Animalia
- Phylum: Arthropoda
- Class: Insecta
- Order: Coleoptera
- Suborder: Polyphaga
- Family: Ptinidae
- Tribe: Cryptoramorphini
- Genus: Cryptoramorphus; White, 1966-01

Genus of beetles

Cryptoramorphus is a genus of death-watch and spider beetles in the family Ptinidae. There are at least two described species in Cryptoramorphus, C. floridanus and C. flavidus.
