= Bulbophyllum absconditum =

Scientific classification
- Kingdom: Plantae
- Clade: Tracheophytes
- Clade: Angiosperms
- Clade: Monocots
- Order: Asparagales
- Family: Orchidaceae
- Subfamily: Epidendroideae
- Genus: Bulbophyllum
- Species: B. absconditum

Binomial name
- Bulbophyllum absconditum J.J. Sm (1905)

Synonyms
- Bulbophyllum absconditum subsp. hastula J.J.Verm. (1993); Bulbophyllum neocaledonicum Schltr. (1906); Bulbophyllum ochrochlamys Schltr. (1913); Pelma absconditum Finet (1909); Pelma neocaledonicum (Schltr.) Finet (1909)

Species of orchid

Bulbophyllum absconditum, known as the hidden bulbophyllum, is a species of orchid in the genus Bulbophyllum. It is named the hidden bulbophyllum because of its miniature flower which eludes being found due to camouflage.

It is found in rainforests in Indonesia and certain parts of Oceania such as Vanuatu and New Caledonia. It is a warm-growing epiphyte found in elevations of 900 to 1,700 meters.
