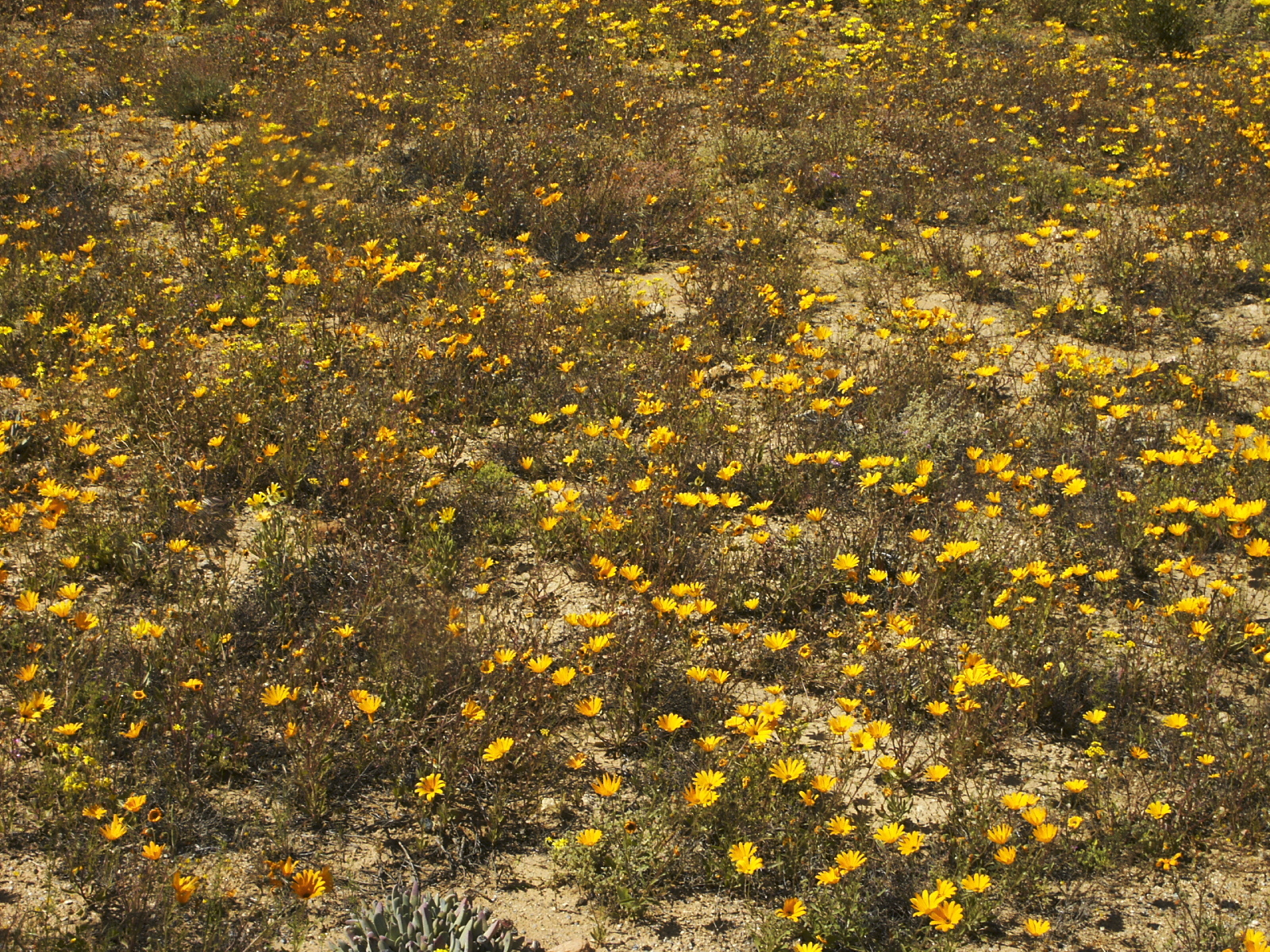
- Dimorphotheca sinuata

Scientific classification
- Kingdom: Plantae
- Clade: Embryophytes
- Clade: Tracheophytes
- Clade: Spermatophytes
- Clade: Angiosperms
- Clade: Eudicots
- Clade: Asterids
- Order: Asterales
- Family: Asteraceae
- Subfamily: Asteroideae
- Tribe: Calenduleae
- Genus: Dimorphotheca; Moench (1794), nom. cons.

Synonyms
- Acanthotheca DC. (1838); Arnoldia Cass. (1824); Blaxium Cass. (1824); Castalis Cass. (1824); Gattenhoffia Neck. (1790), not validly publ.; Meteorina Cass. (1818); Osteospermum sect. Blaxium (Cass.) T. Norl.

= Dimorphotheca =

Genus of plants

Dimorphotheca is a genus of plants in the family Asteraceae, native to southern Africa. is one of eight genera of the Calenduleae, with a centre of diversity in Southern Africa. Species are native to Botswana, Eswatini, Lesotho, Namibia, South Africa, and Zimbabwe. Some species can hybridize with Osteospermum, and crosses are sold as cultivated ornamentals.

The name Dimorphotheca is derived from the Greek: di (two) morph (shape) theka (receptacle), referring to the dimorphic cypselae, a trait inherent to members of the Calenduleae. Plants of this genus usually have bisexual flowers.

Species

- Dimorphotheca acutifolia
- Dimorphotheca barberae
- Dimorphotheca caulescens
- Dimorphotheca chrysanthemifolia
- Dimorphotheca cuneata
- Dimorphotheca dregei
- Dimorphotheca ecklonis
- Dimorphotheca fruticosa
- Dimorphotheca jucunda
- Dimorphotheca montana
- Dimorphotheca nudicaulis
- Dimorphotheca pluvialis ("ox-eye daisy", "Cape daisy", "rain daisy")
- Dimorphotheca polyptera
- Dimorphotheca pulvinalis
- Dimorphotheca sinuata ("Cape marigold", "African daisy", "star of the veldt")
- Dimorphotheca spectabilis
- Dimorphotheca tragus
- Dimorphotheca turicensis
- Dimorphotheca venusta
- Dimorphotheca walliana
- Dimorphotheca zeyheri
