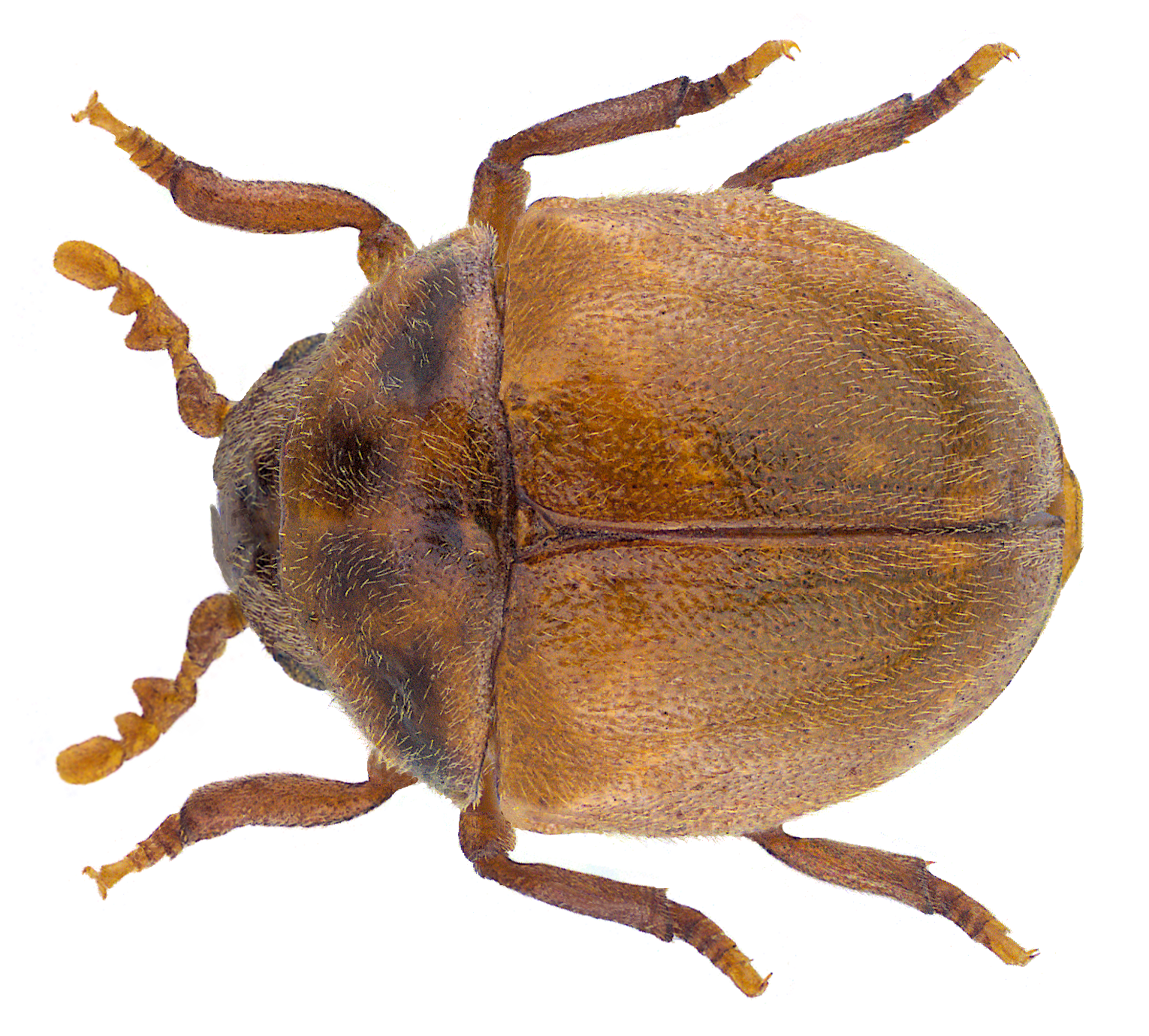
- Anitys rubens

Scientific classification
- Kingdom: Animalia
- Phylum: Arthropoda
- Class: Insecta
- Order: Coleoptera
- Suborder: Polyphaga
- Family: Ptinidae
- Genus: Anitys; Thomson, 1863
- Species: A. rubens

Binomial name
- Anitys rubens (Hoffmann, 1803)

Synonyms
- Dorcatoma rubens Hoffmann, 1803; Amblytoma cognata Mulsant & Rey, 1864

= Anitys =

Genus of beetles

Anitys is a genus of beetles in the family Ptinidae. The genus is monotypic, the sole species being Anitys rubens. It is found in Europe.
