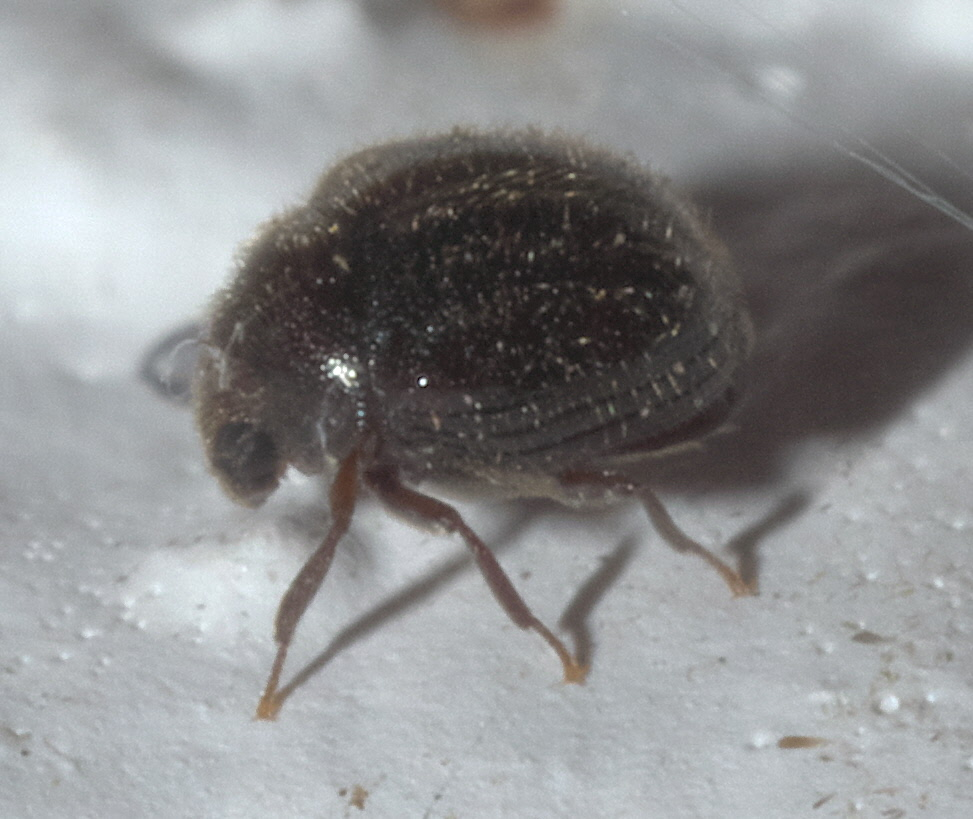
- Caenocara

Scientific classification
- Kingdom: Animalia
- Phylum: Arthropoda
- Class: Insecta
- Order: Coleoptera
- Suborder: Polyphaga
- Family: Ptinidae
- Subfamily: Dorcatominae; C. G. Thomson, 1859

= Dorcatominae =

Subfamily of beetles

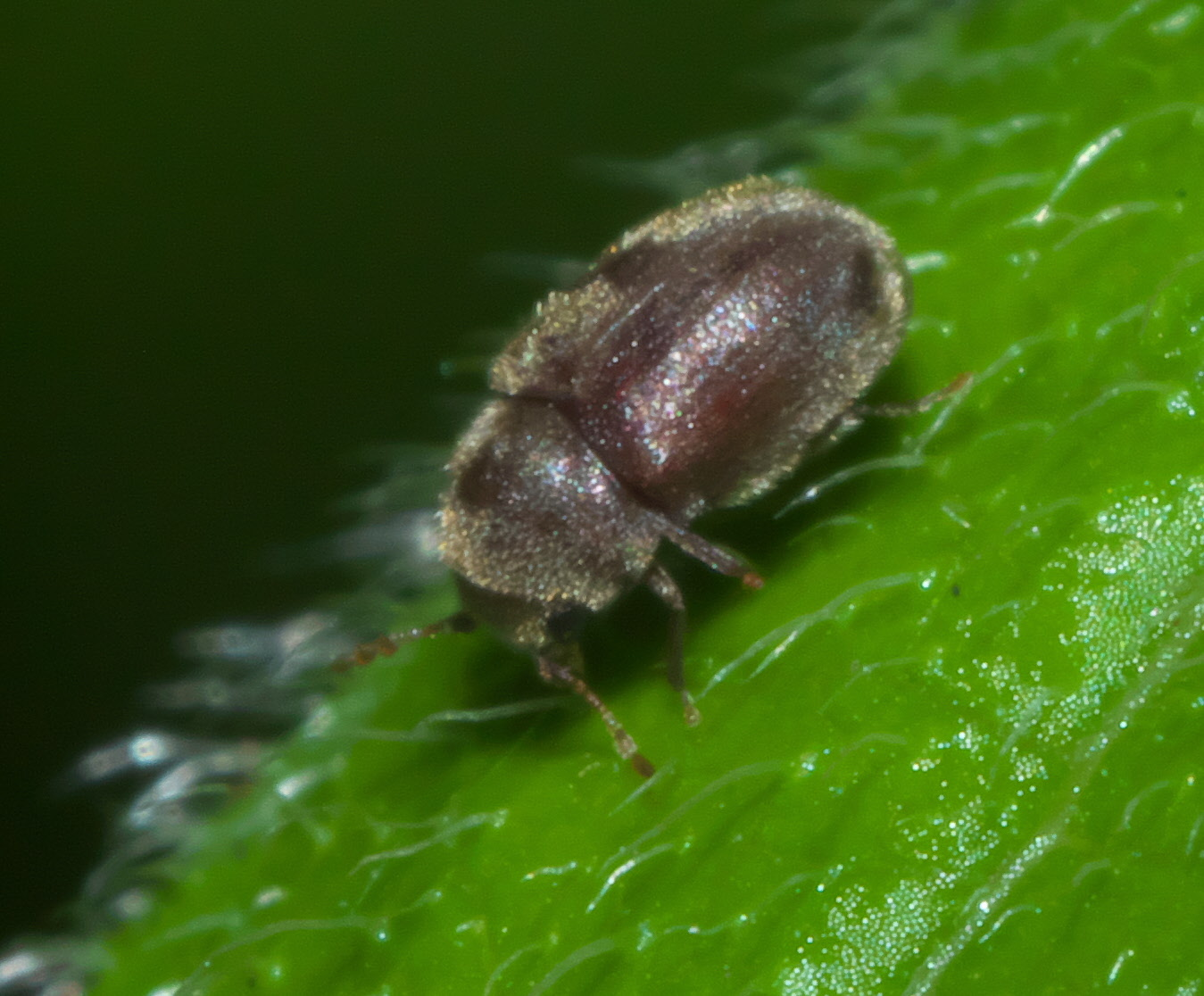
Protheca hispida

Dorcatominae is a subfamily of death-watch and spider beetles in the family Ptinidae. There are about 16 genera and at least 190 described species in Dorcatominae.

The subfamily Dorcatominae, along with Anobiinae and several others, were formerly considered members of the family Anobiidae, but the family name has since been changed to Ptinidae.

== Genera ==
These 16 genera belong to the subfamily Dorcatominae:

- Anitys Thomson, 1863^{g}
- Byrrhodes LeConte, 1878^{i c g b}
- Caenocara Thomson, 1859^{i c g b} (puffball beetles)
- Calymmaderus Solier, 1849^{i c g b}
- Calytheca White, 1973^{i c g}
- Cryptoramorphus White, 1966-01^{i c g}
- Dorcatoma Herbst, 1792^{i c g b}
- Mirosternus Sharp, 1881^{i c g}
- Mizodorcatoma Hayashi, 1955^{g}
- Petalium LeConte, 1861^{i c g b}
- Protheca LeConte, 1865^{i c g b}
- Sculptotheca Schilsky, 1900^{i c g b}
- Stagetus Wollaston, 1861^{i c g b}
- Stichtoptychus Fall, 1905^{i c g b}
- Striatheca White, 1973^{i c g b}
- † Venablesia Britton, 1960^{g}

Data sources: i = ITIS, c = Catalogue of Life, g = GBIF, b = Bugguide.net
