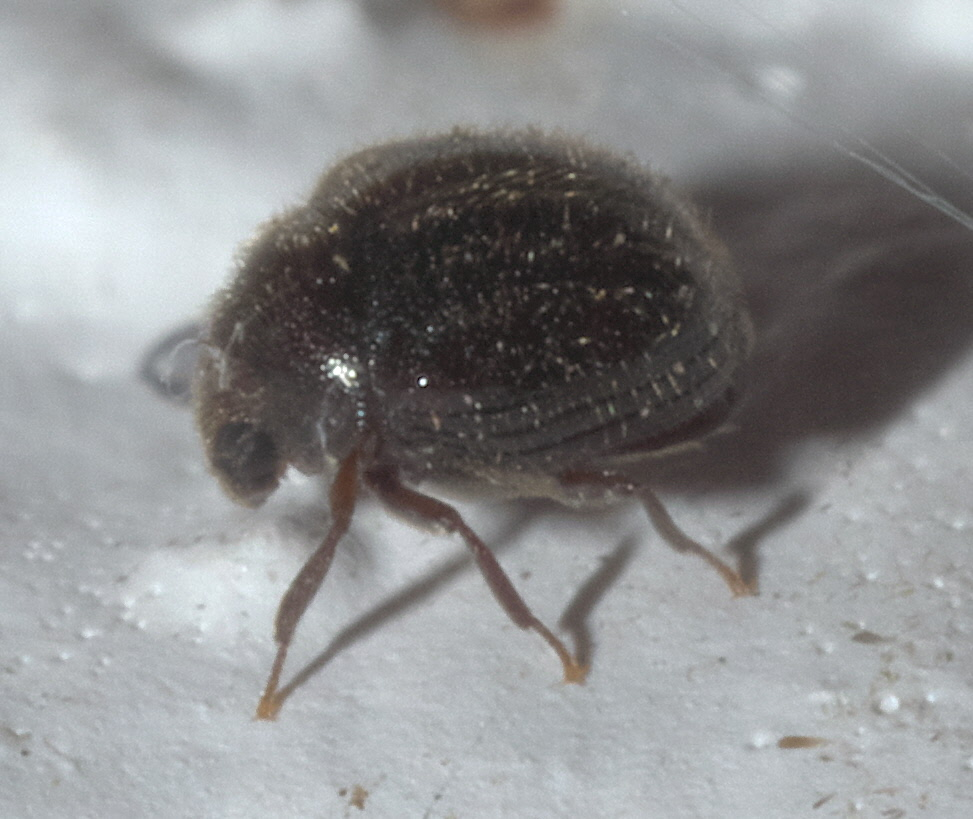
- Caenocara

Scientific classification
- Kingdom: Animalia
- Phylum: Arthropoda
- Class: Insecta
- Order: Coleoptera
- Suborder: Polyphaga
- Infraorder: Bostrichiformia
- Superfamily: Bostrichoidea
- Family: Ptinidae
- Subfamily: Dorcatominae
- Tribe: Dorcatomini

= Dorcatomini =

Tribe of beetles

Dorcatomini is a tribe of beetles in the family Ptinidae. There are at least 3 genera and 50 described species in Dorcatomini.

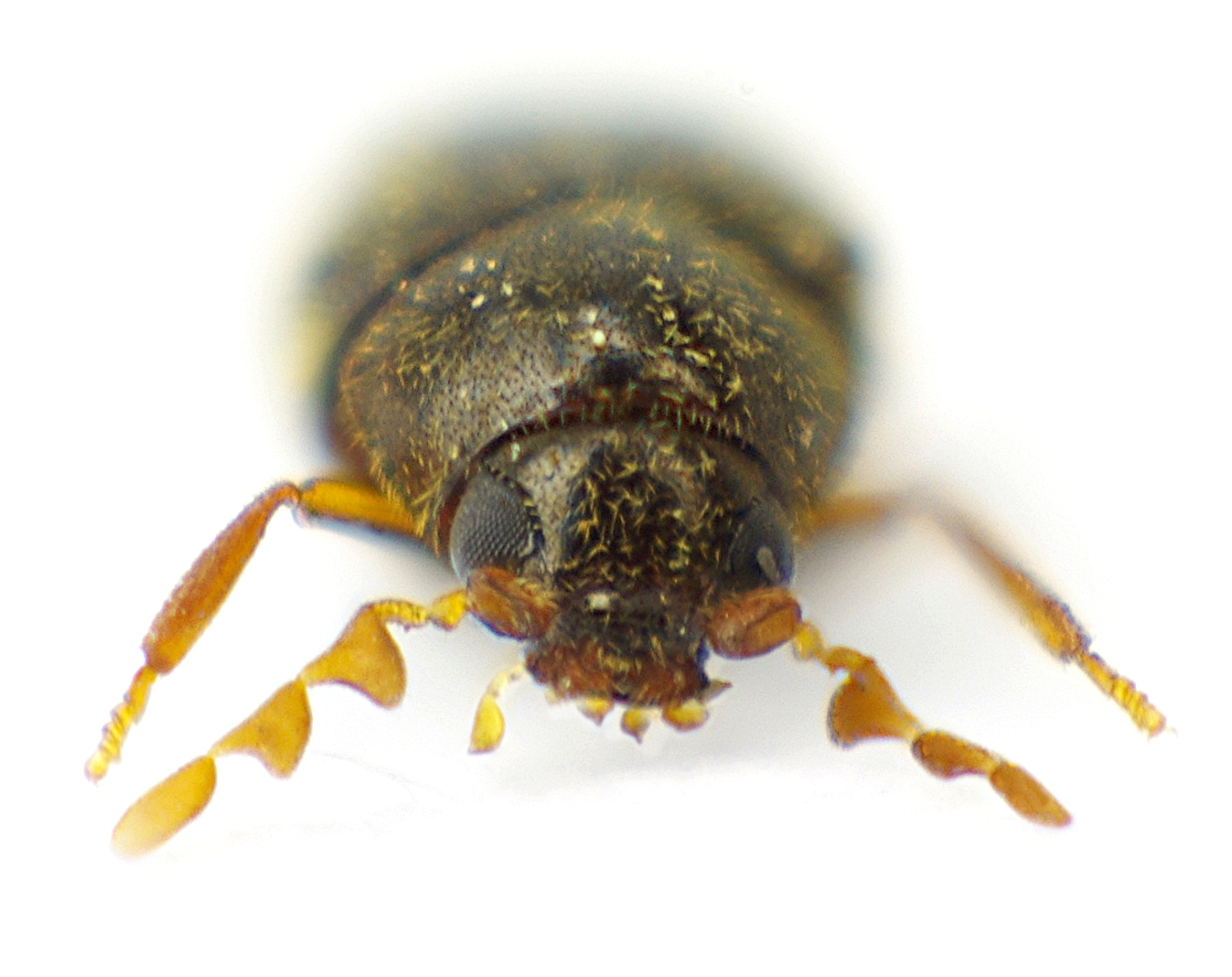
Dorcatoma substriata

== Genera ==
These 11 genera belong to the tribe Dorcatomini:

- Anitys Thomson, 1863^{g}
- ByrrhodesLeConte, Sakai, 1987^{g}
- CaenocaraThomson, Broun, 1893
- Caenotylistus Español, 1977
- Cyphanobium Scott, 1924
- Dimorphotheca Hayashi, 1955^{g}
- DorcatomaHerbst, Ford, 1970
- Metadorcatoma Español, 1977
- Mizodorcatoma 1878
- Mysticephala 1859
- Neobyrrhodes 1792

Data sources: i = ITIS, c = Catalogue of Life, g = GBIF, b = Bugguide.net
