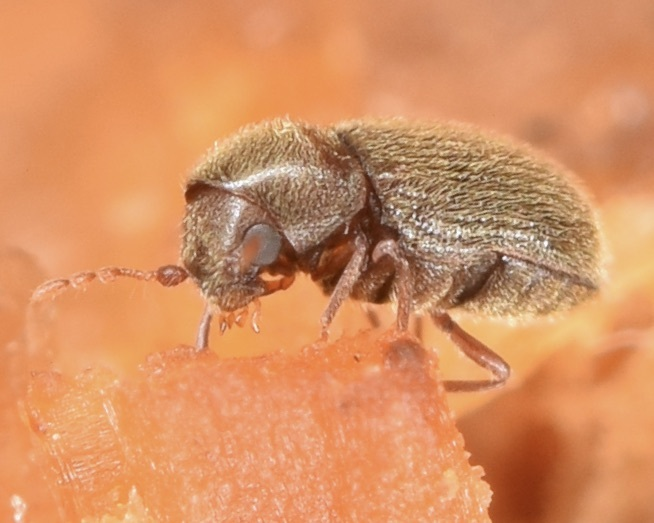

Scientific classification
- Kingdom: Animalia
- Phylum: Arthropoda
- Class: Insecta
- Order: Coleoptera
- Suborder: Polyphaga
- Family: Ptinidae
- Genus: Sculptotheca
- Species: S. puberula

Binomial name
- Sculptotheca puberula (LeConte, 1865)

Synonyms
- Protheca puberula

= Sculptotheca puberula =

Species of beetle

Sculptotheca puberula is a species of beetle in the family Ptinidae. It is found in eastern North America in both Canada and the United States.

Sculptotheca puberula measure 1.5–2 mm (0.059–0.079 in).
