= Stagetus profundus =

Scientific classification
- Kingdom: Animalia
- Phylum: Arthropoda
- Class: Insecta
- Order: Coleoptera
- Suborder: Polyphaga
- Family: Ptinidae
- Genus: Stagetus
- Species: S. profundus

Binomial name
- Stagetus profundus (LeConte, 1865)

Synonyms
- Stagetus striatopunctatus (LeConte, 1884)

Species of beetle

Stagetus profundus is a species of beetle in the family Ptinidae.
