= Stagetus =

Scientific classification
- Kingdom: Animalia
- Phylum: Arthropoda
- Clade: Pancrustacea
- Class: Insecta
- Order: Coleoptera
- Suborder: Polyphaga
- Family: Ptinidae
- Tribe: Prothecini
- Genus: Stagetus; Wollaston, 1861

Synonyms
- Anomotheca Schilsky, 1899

Genus of beetles

Stagetus is a genus of death-watch and spider beetles in the family Ptinidae. There are at least 20 described species in Stagetus. They eat fungi.

== Species ==
These species belong to the genus Stagetus:

- Stagetus andalusiacus (Aubé, 1861)^{g}
- Stagetus borealis Israelsson, 1971^{g}
- Stagetus byrrhoides (Mulsant & Rey, 1861)^{g}
- Stagetus championi (Schilsky, 1899)^{g}
- Stagetus cobosi Viñolas, 2012
- Stagetus conicicollis (Schilsky, 1899)^{g}
- Stagetus curimoides (Reitter, 1884)^{g}
- Stagetus dorcatomoides (Brenske & Reitter, 1884)^{g}
- Stagetus elongatus (Mulsant & Rey, 1861)^{g}
- Stagetus euphorbiae Israelson, 1971^{g}
- Stagetus ferreri Español, 1994^{g}
- Stagetus franzi Español, 1969^{g}
- Stagetus grossus White, 1976^{i c g}
- Stagetus hirtulus Wollaston, 1861^{g}
- Stagetus italicus (Reitter, 1885)^{g}
- Stagetus micoae Viñolas, 2011
- Stagetus montanus Toskina, 1998^{g}
- Stagetus pellitus (Chevrolat, 1859)^{g}
- Stagetus pilula (Aubé, 1861)^{g}
- Stagetus profundus (LeConte, 1865)^{i c g b}
- Stagetus propinquus (Obenberger, 1917)^{g}
- Stagetus puncticollis (Brenske & Reitter, 1884)^{g}
- Stagetus sardous (Reitter, 1915)^{g}
- Stagetus thurepalmi Israelson, 1971^{g}

Data sources: i = ITIS, c = Catalogue of Life, g = GBIF, b = Bugguide.net
