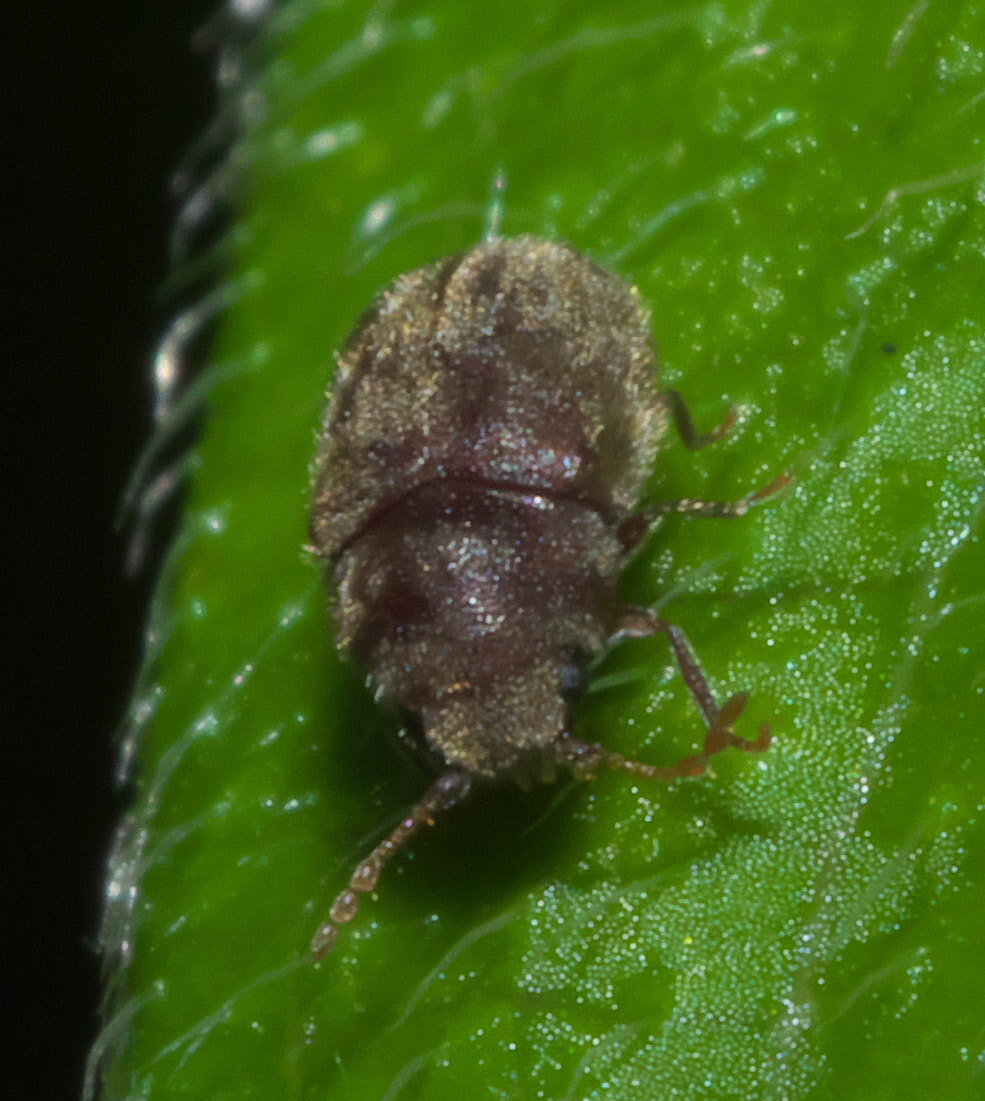

Scientific classification
- Kingdom: Animalia
- Phylum: Arthropoda
- Class: Insecta
- Order: Coleoptera
- Suborder: Polyphaga
- Family: Ptinidae
- Genus: Protheca
- Species: P. hispida

Binomial name
- Protheca hispida LeConte, 1865

= Protheca hispida =

Species of beetle

Protheca hispida is a species of beetle in the family Ptinidae.

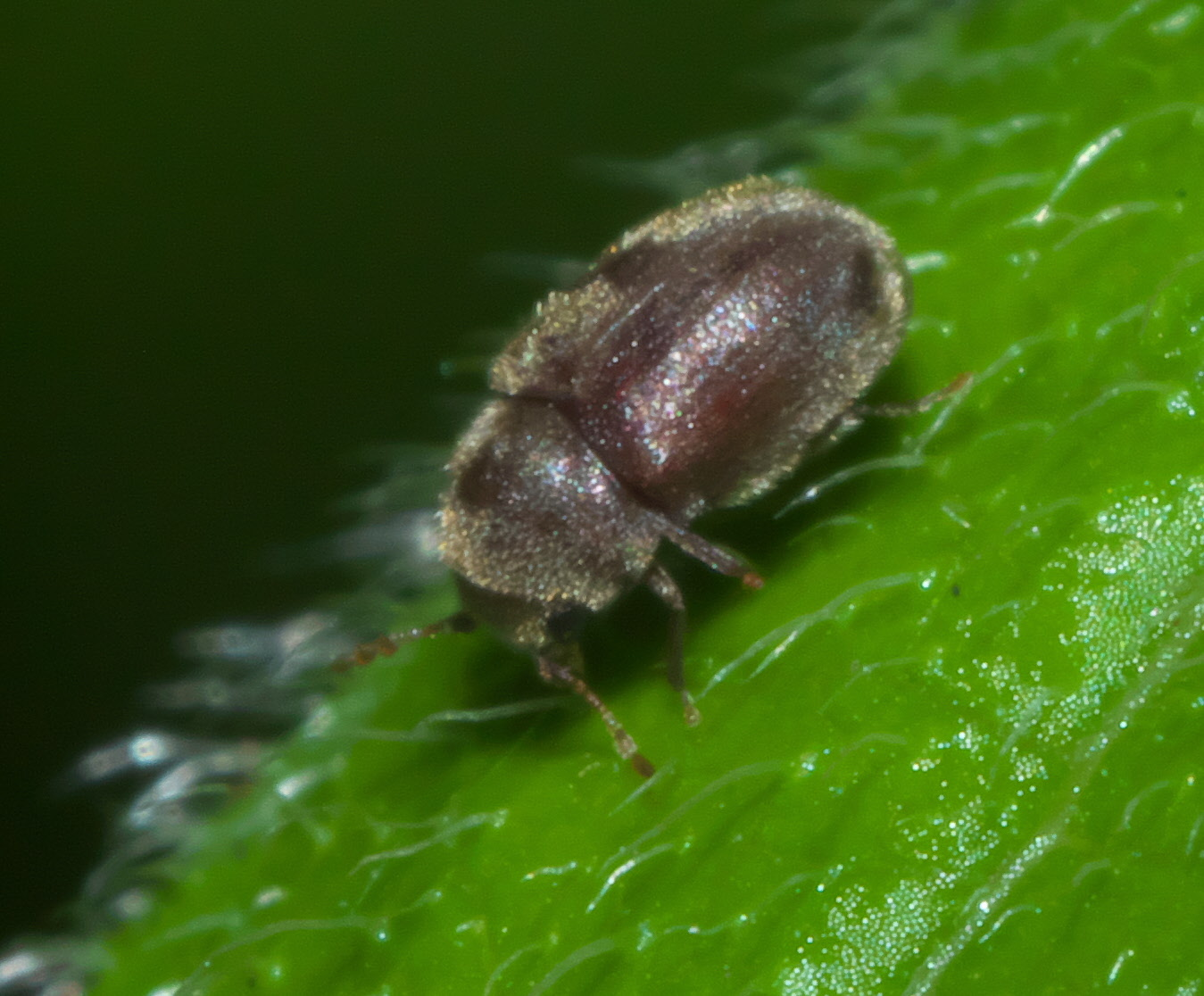
