= Striatheca lineata =

Scientific classification
- Kingdom: Animalia
- Phylum: Arthropoda
- Class: Insecta
- Order: Coleoptera
- Suborder: Polyphaga
- Family: Ptinidae
- Genus: Striatheca
- Species: S. lineata

Binomial name
- Striatheca lineata White, 1973

Species of beetle

Striatheca lineata is a species of beetle in the family Ptinidae.
