= Stichtoptychus =

Scientific classification
- Kingdom: Animalia
- Phylum: Arthropoda
- Class: Insecta
- Order: Coleoptera
- Suborder: Polyphaga
- Family: Ptinidae
- Tribe: Prothecini
- Genus: Stichtoptychus; Fall, 1905

Genus of beetles

Stichtoptychus is a genus of beetles in the family Ptinidae. There are about 13 described species in Stichtoptychus.

== Species ==
These 13 species belong to the genus Stichtoptychus:

- Stichtoptychus agonus Fall, 1905^{i c g b}
- Stichtoptychus aurantiacus White^{g}
- Stichtoptychus elegans White^{g}
- Stichtoptychus elongatus White^{g}
- Stichtoptychus fulgidus White^{g}
- Stichtoptychus megalops White^{g}
- Stichtoptychus mexambrus Spilman, 1971^{g}
- Stichtoptychus ocellatus White^{g}
- Stichtoptychus ornamentus White^{g}
- Stichtoptychus platyops White^{g}
- Stichtoptychus rubidus White^{g}
- Stichtoptychus vittatus White^{g}
- Stichtoptychus volutus White^{g}

Data sources: i = ITIS, c = Catalogue of Life, g = GBIF, b = Bugguide.net
