= Stagetus borealis =

Scientific classification
- Kingdom: Animalia
- Phylum: Arthropoda
- Class: Insecta
- Order: Coleoptera
- Suborder: Polyphaga
- Family: Ptinidae
- Genus: Stagetus
- Species: S. borealis

Binomial name
- Stagetus borealis Israelsson, 1971

Species of beetle

Stagetus borealis is a species of beetle in the family Ptinidae.
