= Stichtoptychus agonus =

Scientific classification
- Kingdom: Animalia
- Phylum: Arthropoda
- Class: Insecta
- Order: Coleoptera
- Suborder: Polyphaga
- Family: Ptinidae
- Genus: Stichtoptychus
- Species: S. agonus

Binomial name
- Stichtoptychus agonus Fall, 1905

Species of beetle

Stichtoptychus agonus is a species of beetle in the family Ptinidae.
