= Sculptotheca =

Scientific classification
- Kingdom: Animalia
- Phylum: Arthropoda
- Class: Insecta
- Order: Coleoptera
- Suborder: Polyphaga
- Superfamily: Bostrichoidea
- Family: Ptinidae
- Subfamily: Dorcatominae
- Tribe: Prothecini
- Genus: Sculptotheca; Schilsky, 1900

Genus of beetles

Sculptotheca is a genus of beetles in the family Ptinidae. There are about ten described species in Sculptotheca, one of which is Sculptotheca puberula.
