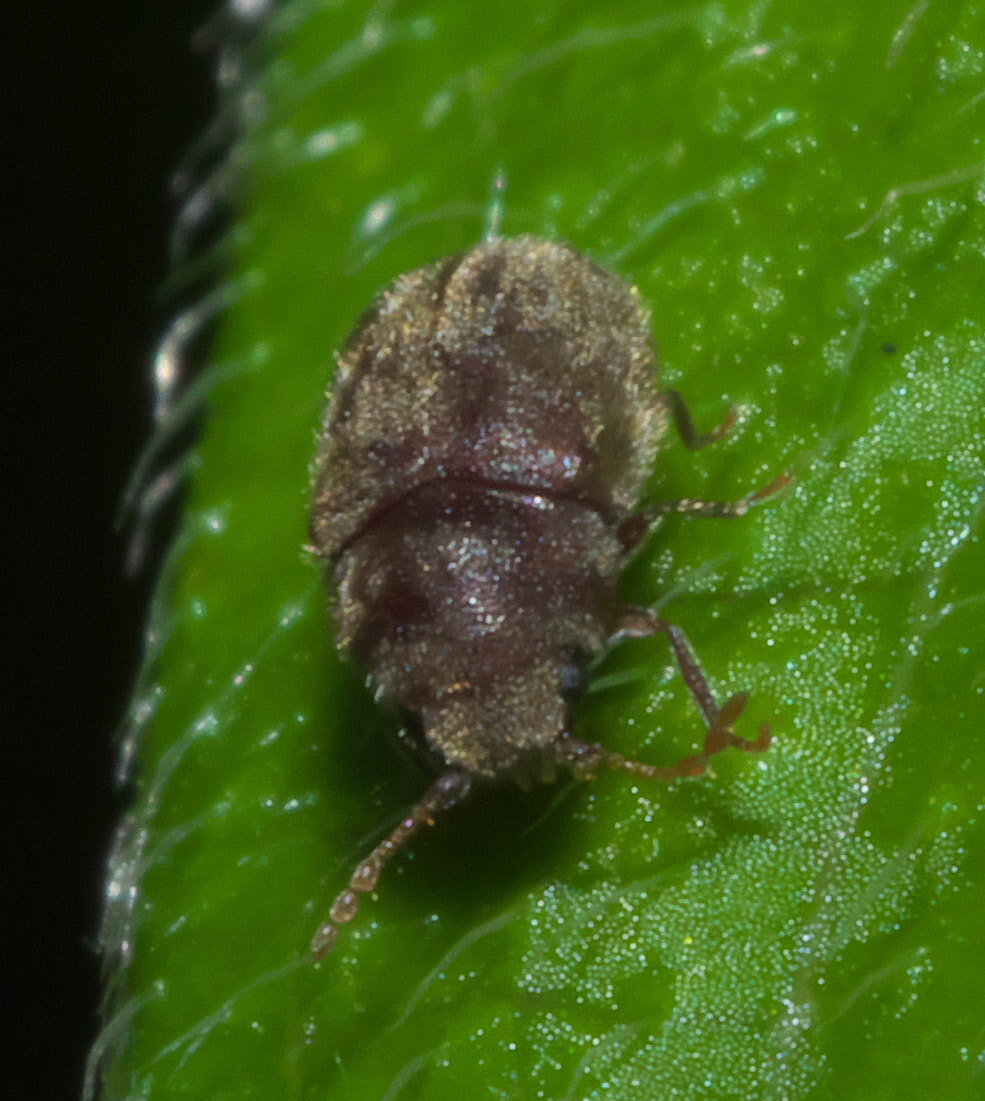
- Protheca hispida

Scientific classification
- Kingdom: Animalia
- Phylum: Arthropoda
- Clade: Pancrustacea
- Class: Insecta
- Order: Coleoptera
- Suborder: Polyphaga
- Infraorder: Bostrichiformia
- Superfamily: Bostrichoidea
- Family: Ptinidae
- Subfamily: Dorcatominae
- Tribe: Prothecini

= Prothecini =

Tribe of beetles

Prothecini is a tribe of death-watch and spider beetles in the family Ptinidae. There are about 15 genera in Prothecini.

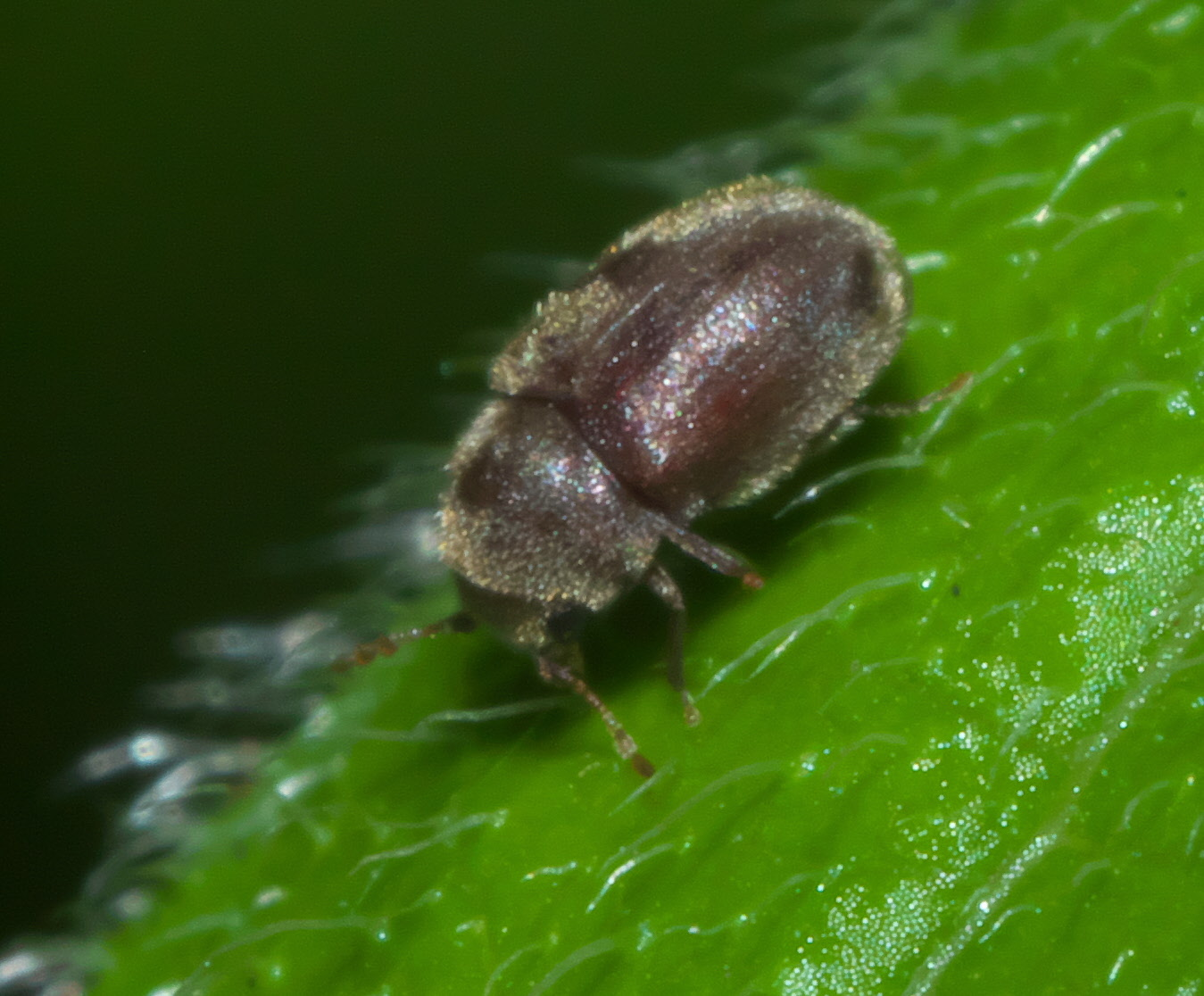
Protheca hispida

== Genera ==
These 15 genera belong to the tribe Prothecini:

- Anakania Pic, 1901^{g}
- Anisotheca Español, 1970
- Ascutotheca Lesne, 1911
- Chondrotheca Lesne, 1911
- Falsostagetus Viñolas et Masó, 2008
- Metatheca Scott, 1924
- Methemus Broun, 1882
- Nesotheca Scott, 1924
- Peritheca Logvinovskiy, 1978
- Protheca LeConte, 1865^{i c g b}
- Sculptotheca Schilsky, 1900^{i c g b}
- Stagetodes Español, 1970^{g}
- Stagetus Wollaston, 1861^{i c g b}
- Stichtoptychus Fall, 1905^{i c g b}
- Striatheca White, 1973^{i c g b}

Data sources: i = ITIS, c = Catalogue of Life, g = GBIF, b = Bugguide.net
