= Striatheca =

Scientific classification
- Kingdom: Animalia
- Phylum: Arthropoda
- Class: Insecta
- Order: Coleoptera
- Suborder: Polyphaga
- Family: Ptinidae
- Tribe: Prothecini
- Genus: Striatheca; White, 1973

Genus of beetles

Striatheca is a genus of beetles in the family Ptinidae. There are at least three described species in Striatheca:

- Striatheca cariniceps Sakai, 1983
- Striatheca filipinae Sakai, 1987
- Striatheca lineata White, 1973
