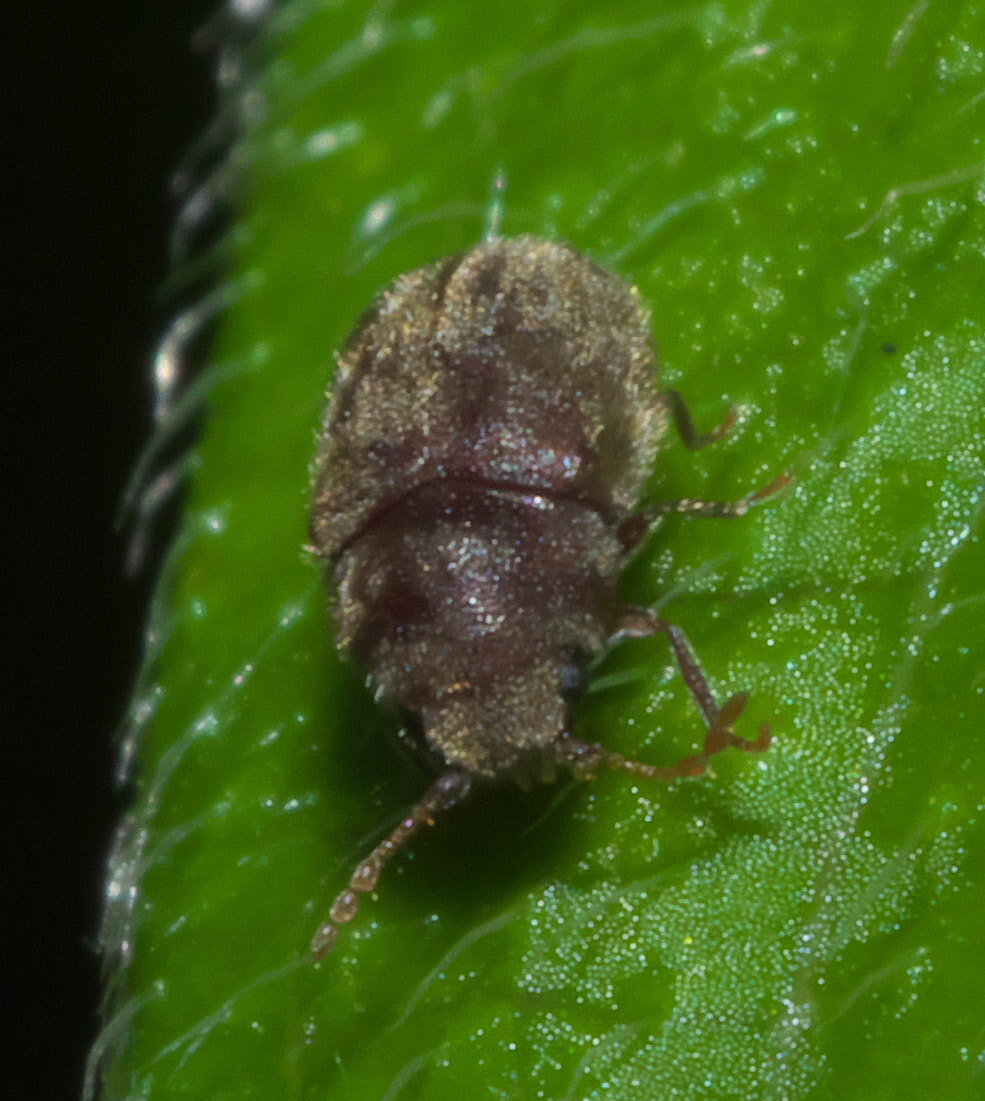
- Protheca hispida

Scientific classification
- Kingdom: Animalia
- Phylum: Arthropoda
- Class: Insecta
- Order: Coleoptera
- Suborder: Polyphaga
- Superfamily: Bostrichoidea
- Family: Ptinidae
- Subfamily: Dorcatominae
- Tribe: Prothecini
- Genus: Protheca; LeConte, 1865

= Protheca =

Genus of beetles

Protheca is a genus of beetles in the family Ptinidae. There are at least three described species in Protheca.

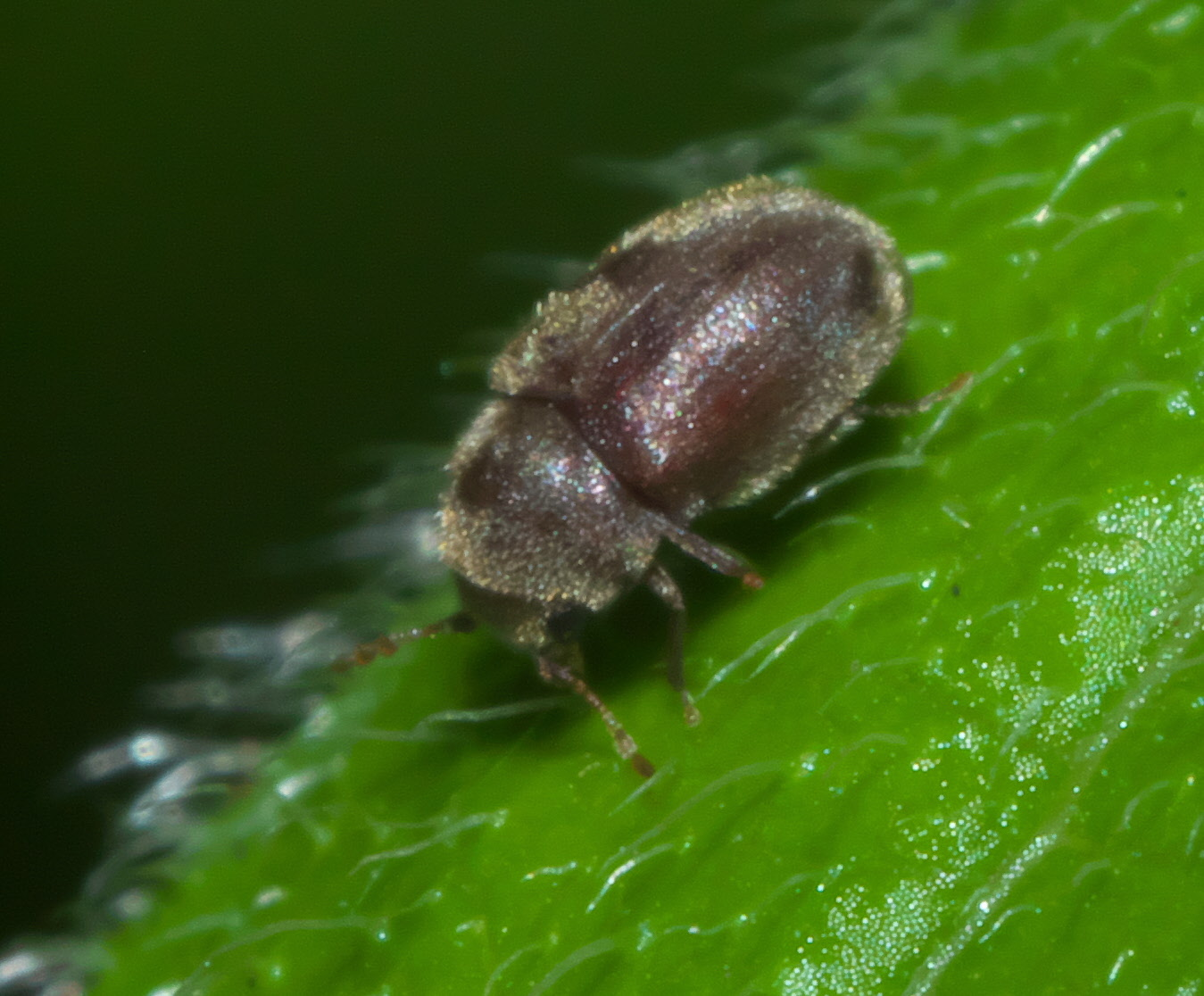
Protheca hispida

== Species ==
These three species belong to the genus Protheca:

- Protheca guadalupensis (Pic, 1909)^{g}
- Protheca hispida LeConte, 1865^{i c g b}
- Protheca plicatipennis (Pic, 1912)^{g}

Data sources: i = ITIS, c = Catalogue of Life, g = GBIF, b = Bugguide.net
