= Russatus nigrescens =

Conservation status
- Data Deficient (IUCN 2.3)

Scientific classification
- Kingdom: Animalia
- Phylum: Mollusca
- Class: Gastropoda
- Order: Stylommatophora
- Family: Charopidae
- Genus: Russatus
- Species: R. nigrescens

Binomial name
- Russatus nigrescens (Möllendorff, 1900)

Species of gastropod

Russatus nigrescens is a species of small air-breathing land snail, a terrestrial pulmonate gastropod mollusk in the family Charopidae. This species is endemic to Micronesia.
