= Setomedea nudicostata =

Conservation status
- Near Threatened (IUCN 2.3)

Scientific classification
- Kingdom: Animalia
- Phylum: Mollusca
- Class: Gastropoda
- Order: Stylommatophora
- Family: Charopidae
- Genus: Setomedea
- Species: S. nudicostata

Binomial name
- Setomedea nudicostata Stanisic, 1990

Species of gastropod

Setomedea nudicostata is a species of small air-breathing land snail, a terrestrial pulmonate gastropod mollusk in the family Charopidae. This species is endemic to Australia.
