= Corinomala tumida =

Conservation status
- Vulnerable (IUCN 2.3)

Scientific classification
- Kingdom: Animalia
- Phylum: Mollusca
- Class: Gastropoda
- Order: Stylommatophora
- Family: Charopidae
- Genus: Corinomala
- Species: C. tumida

Binomial name
- Corinomala tumida (Odhner, 1917)

Synonyms
- Endodonta tumida Odhner, 1917; Pilsbrycharopa tumida (Odhner, 1917)

Species of gastropod

Corinomala tumida is a species of land snail in the family Charopidae. This species is endemic to Australia and occurs in the Kimberley Region (Western Australia).
