= Goweroconcha wenda =

Scientific classification
- Kingdom: Animalia
- Phylum: Mollusca
- Class: Gastropoda
- Order: Stylommatophora
- Family: Charopidae
- Subfamily: Charopinae
- Genus: Goweroconcha
- Species: G. wenda

Binomial name
- Goweroconcha wenda Iredale, 1944
- Location of Lord Howe Island

Species of land snail

Goweroconcha wenda, also known as the pale-zigzag pinwheel snail, is a species of air-breathing land snail, a terrestrial pulmonate gastropod mollusc in the pinwheel snail family, that is endemic to Australia's Lord Howe Island in the Tasman Sea.

== Description ==
The shell of the snail is 1.9–2.4 mm in height, with a diameter of 4.2–4.5 mm. The colour is pale golden-brown with faint cream flammulations (flame-like markings) on some individuals. The shape is discoidal with a flat to slightly sunken spire, rounded whorls, impressed sutures, and with prominent, sinuous, moderately widely-spaced radial ribs. The umbilicus is widely open. The aperture is roundly lunate, angulate at base. The animal is unknown.

== Distribution and habitat ==
This very rare snail has been recorded on the island from Little Slope and the summit of Mount Gower.
