= Oreomava cannfluviatilus =

Conservation status
- Data Deficient (IUCN 2.3)

Scientific classification
- Kingdom: Animalia
- Phylum: Mollusca
- Class: Gastropoda
- Order: Stylommatophora
- Family: Charopidae
- Genus: Oreomava
- Species: O. cannfluviatilus

Binomial name
- Oreomava cannfluviatilus Gabriel, 1929

Species of gastropod

Oreomava cannfluviatilus is a species of small air-breathing land snail, a terrestrial pulmonate gastropod mollusk in the family Charopidae. This species is endemic to Australia.
