= Thermia =

Thermia can refer to the following :

Places and jurisdictions

- Thermeia, a village in Cyprus
- the popular and historical name of the Greek island of Kythnos, in the Cyclades (Aegean Greece)
  - the Latin Catholic bishopric of Thermia, 17th century name of the former Roman Catholic Diocese of Ceo (now titular see of Cea), covering both Cycladic islands
  - the Greek Orthodox eparchy (diocese) on the above island

Biology

- Thermia (gastropod), genus of land snails
