= Coenocharopa elegans =

Scientific classification
- Kingdom: Animalia
- Phylum: Mollusca
- Class: Gastropoda
- Order: Stylommatophora
- Family: Charopidae
- Genus: Coenocharopa
- Species: C. elegans

Binomial name
- Coenocharopa elegans Stanisic, 2010

Species of gastropod

Coenocharopa elegans, the elegant pinwheel snail, is a species of air-breathing land snails in the family Charopidae. It is found in Queensland, Australia.
