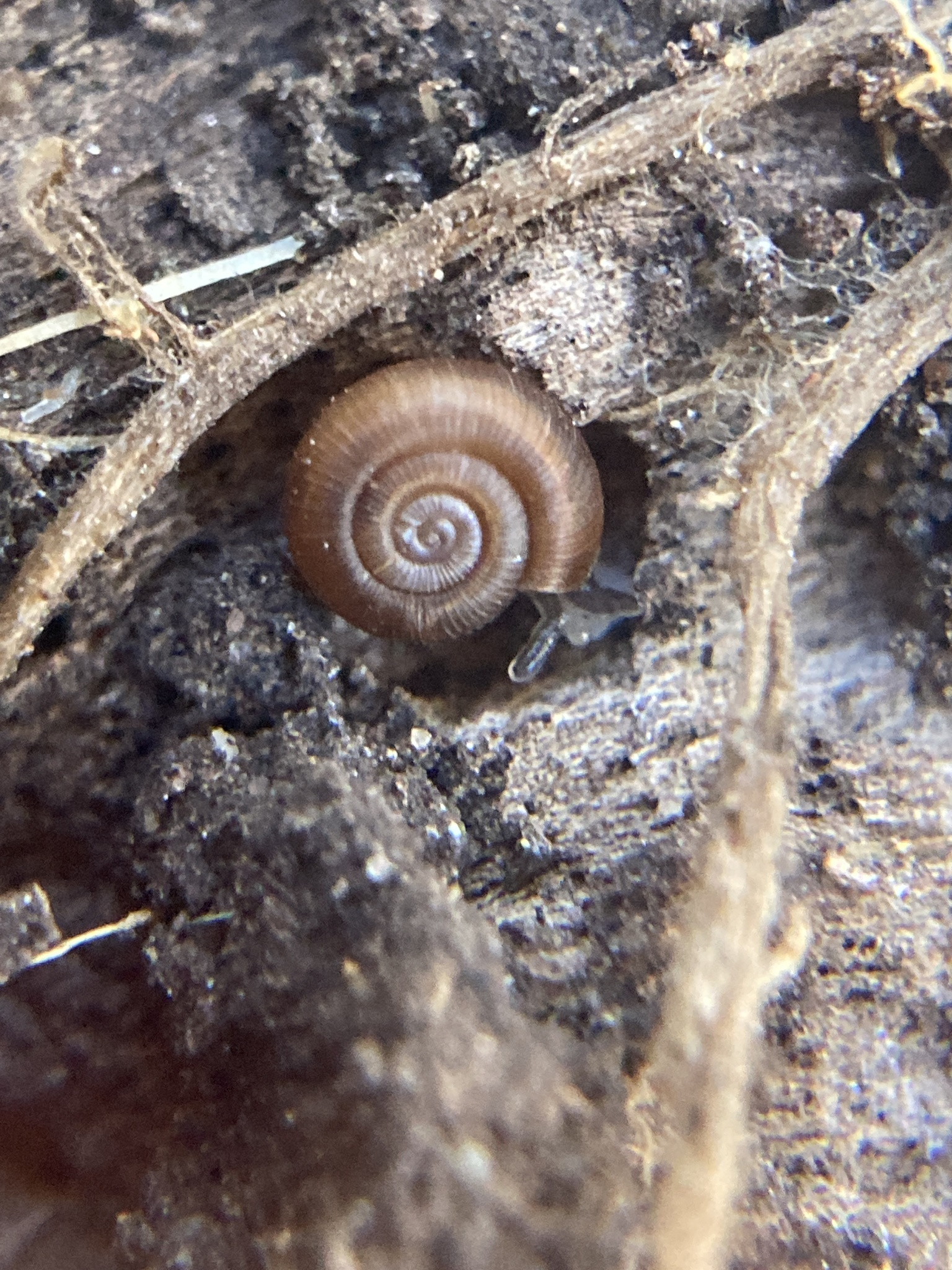

Scientific classification
- Kingdom: Animalia
- Phylum: Mollusca
- Class: Gastropoda
- Order: Stylommatophora
- Family: Charopidae
- Genus: Diphyoropa
- Species: D. saturni

Binomial name
- Diphyoropa saturni (Cox, 1864)

Synonyms
- Dentherona saturni (Cox, 1864); Helix costulata Cox, 1864; Helix saturni Cox, 1864

= Diphyoropa saturni =

Species of land snail

Diphyoropa saturni, also known as the Sydney copper pinwheel snail, is a species of pinwheel snail that is endemic to eastern Australia.

== Description ==
The shell of mature snails is 1.6–1.8 mm in height, with a diameter of 3.2–3.5 mm, discoidal with a flat to slightly sunken spire, with rounded whorls, impressed sutures and widely spaced radial ribs. It is uniformly coppery-brown in colouration. The umbilicus is widely open. The aperture is ovately lunate. The animal has a white body.

== Distribution ==
The snail has a natural range extending from south-eastern Queensland to south-eastern New South Wales. It has been introduced to Victoria and Lord Howe Island.
