= Rhophodon kempseyensis =

Conservation status
- Data Deficient (IUCN 2.3)

Scientific classification
- Kingdom: Animalia
- Phylum: Mollusca
- Class: Gastropoda
- Order: Stylommatophora
- Family: Charopidae
- Genus: Rhophodon
- Species: R. kempseyensis

Binomial name
- Rhophodon kempseyensis Stanisic, 1990

Species of gastropod

Rhophodon kempseyensis is a species of air-breathing land snail, a terrestrial pulmonate gastropod mollusk in the family Charopidae. This species is endemic to Australia.
