= Gerontia pantherina =

Scientific classification
- Domain: Eukaryota
- Kingdom: Animalia
- Phylum: Mollusca
- Class: Gastropoda
- Order: Stylommatophora
- Family: Charopidae
- Genus: Gerontia
- Species: G. pantherina

Binomial name
- Gerontia pantherina (Hutton, 1882)

Species of gastropod

Gerontia pantherina is a species of small air-breathing land snails, terrestrial gastropod mollusks in the family Charopidae.
