= Palline notera =

Conservation status
- Critically Endangered (IUCN 3.1)

Scientific classification
- Kingdom: Animalia
- Phylum: Mollusca
- Class: Gastropoda
- Order: Stylommatophora
- Family: Charopidae
- Genus: Palline
- Species: P. notera

Binomial name
- Palline notera Solem, 1983

Species of gastropod

Palline notera is a species of small air-breathing land snails, terrestrial pulmonate gastropod mollusks in the family Charopidae. This species is endemic to Palau.
