= Charopella wilkinsoni =

Scientific classification
- Kingdom: Animalia
- Phylum: Mollusca
- Class: Gastropoda
- Order: Stylommatophora
- Family: Charopidae
- Subfamily: Charopinae
- Genus: Charopella
- Species: C. wilkinsoni

Binomial name
- Charopella wilkinsoni (Brazier, 1889)
- Location of Lord Howe Island

Synonyms
- Helix (Charopa) wilkinsoni Brazier, 1889

Species of land snail

Charopella wilkinsoni, also known as Wilkinson's pinwheel snail, is a species of air-breathing land snail, a terrestrial pulmonate gastropod mollusc in the pinwheel snail family, that is endemic to Australia's Lord Howe Island in the Tasman Sea.

== Description ==
The shell of these snails are 1.3–1.7 mm in height, with a diameter of 3–3.6 mm. The colour is pale golden-brown with cream or orange-brown flammulations (flame-like markings). The shape is discoidal with a low spire, whorls shouldered with an angulate periphery, with fine, closely-spaced radial ribs. The umbilicus is widely open. The aperture is rounded and lunate. The animal has a white body with dark grey eyestalks.

== Distribution and habitat ==
The snail is found across the island; it is most common at the northern end, living in plant litter in rainforest and moist woodland.
