= Bischoffena bischoffensis =

Conservation status
- Data Deficient (IUCN 3.1)

Scientific classification
- Kingdom: Animalia
- Phylum: Mollusca
- Class: Gastropoda
- Order: Stylommatophora
- Family: Charopidae
- Genus: Bischoffena
- Species: B. bischoffensis

Binomial name
- Bischoffena bischoffensis (Petterd, 1879)

Species of gastropod

Bischoffena bischoffensis is a species of small air-breathing land snails, terrestrial gastropod mollusks in the family Charopidae. This species is endemic to Australia. Its natural habitat is temperate forests. It has been recorded from nine sites and there may be more but the species is not easily accessible. The population is unknown and whether it is declining or not as habitat loss for agriculture and forestry in some parts may have affected the species of a few percent in the past 200 years. Life history is also unknown but it may have a short lifespan.
