= Rhophodon problematica =

Conservation status
- Data Deficient (IUCN 2.3)

Scientific classification
- Kingdom: Animalia
- Phylum: Mollusca
- Class: Gastropoda
- Order: Stylommatophora
- Family: Charopidae
- Genus: Rhophodon
- Species: R. problematica

Binomial name
- Rhophodon problematica Gabriel 1947

Species of gastropod

Rhophodon problematica is a species of small air-breathing land snail, a terrestrial pulmonate gastropod mollusk in the family Charopidae. This species is endemic to Australia.
