= Letomola =

Scientific classification
- Kingdom: Animalia
- Phylum: Mollusca
- Class: Gastropoda
- Order: Stylommatophora
- Family: Charopidae
- Genus: Letomola; Iredale, 1941

Genus of gastropods

Letomola is a genus of small air-breathing land snails, terrestrial pulmonate gastropod mollusks in the family Charopidae.

== Species ==
Species within the genus Letomola include:

- Letomola barrenensis
- Letomola contortus
