= Dupucharopa millestriata =

Conservation status
- Vulnerable (IUCN 2.3)

Scientific classification
- Kingdom: Animalia
- Phylum: Mollusca
- Class: Gastropoda
- Order: Stylommatophora
- Family: Charopidae
- Genus: Dupucharopa
- Species: D. millestriata

Binomial name
- Dupucharopa millestriata (Smith, 1874)

Synonyms
- Helix millestriata Smith, E.A. 1874

Species of gastropod

Dupucharopa millestriata is a species of small, air-breathing land snails, terrestrial gastropod mollusks in the family Charopidae. This species is endemic to Australia.

== Distribution ==
This species is endemic to the coastal areas of Western Australia.
