= Gyropena verans =

Scientific classification
- Kingdom: Animalia
- Phylum: Mollusca
- Class: Gastropoda
- Order: Stylommatophora
- Family: Charopidae
- Subfamily: Charopinae
- Genus: Gyropena
- Species: G. verans

Binomial name
- Gyropena verans Iredale, 1944
- Location of Lord Howe Island

Species of land snail

Gyropena verans, also known as the sunken-spired pinwheel snail, is a species of air-breathing land snail, a terrestrial pulmonate gastropod mollusc in the pinwheel snail family, that is endemic to Australia's Lord Howe Island in the Tasman Sea.

== Description ==
The shell of the snail is 1.3–1.5 mm in height, with a diameter of 2.7–2.9 mm. The colour is pale fawn with irregular brown flammulations (flame-like markings). The shape is discoidal with a sunken spire, shouldered whorls, impressed sutures, and with prominent, closely-spaced radial ribs. The umbilicus is widely open. The aperture is roundly lunate. The animal is unknown.

== Distribution and habitat ==
This very rare snail occurs on the summits and slopes of Mount Lidgbird and Mount Gower, inhabiting plant litter.
