= Charopella zela =

Scientific classification
- Kingdom: Animalia
- Phylum: Mollusca
- Class: Gastropoda
- Order: Stylommatophora
- Family: Charopidae
- Subfamily: Charopinae
- Genus: Charopella
- Species: C. zela

Binomial name
- Charopella zela Iredale, 1944
- Location of Lord Howe Island

Species of land snail

Charopella zela, also known as the Mount Gower banded pinwheel snail, is a species of air-breathing land snail, a terrestrial pulmonate gastropod mollusc in the pinwheel snail family, that is endemic to Australia's Lord Howe Island in the Tasman Sea.

== Description ==
The shell of these snails are 1.6–1.9 mm in height, with a diameter of 3 mm. The colour is cream with dark orange-brown flammulations (flame-like markings). The shape is discoidal with a moderately raised spire, whorls shouldered with an angulate periphery, with coarse, moderately closely-spaced radial ribs. The umbilicus is moderately widely open. The aperture is rounded and lunate. The animal is unknown.

== Distribution and habitat ==
This very rare snail is known only from the summit of Mount Gower and the upper slopes of Mount Lidgbird, and has never been collected alive.
