= Coenocharopa yessabahensis =

Conservation status
- Data Deficient (IUCN 2.3)

Scientific classification
- Kingdom: Animalia
- Phylum: Mollusca
- Class: Gastropoda
- Order: Stylommatophora
- Family: Charopidae
- Genus: Coenocharopa
- Species: C. yessabahensis

Binomial name
- Coenocharopa yessabahensis Stanisic, 1990

Species of gastropod

Coenocharopa yessabahensis is a species of very small air-breathing land snails, terrestrial pulmonate gastropod mollusks in the family Charopidae, superfamily Punctoidea. This species is endemic to Australia.
