= Planilaoma luckmanii =

Conservation status
- Least Concern (IUCN 3.1)

Scientific classification
- Kingdom: Animalia
- Phylum: Mollusca
- Class: Gastropoda
- Order: Stylommatophora
- Family: Charopidae
- Genus: Planilaoma
- Species: P. luckmanii

Binomial name
- Planilaoma luckmanii (Brazier, 1877)

Species of gastropod

Planilaoma luckmanii is a species of small air-breathing land snails, terrestrial pulmonate gastropod mollusks in the family Charopidae. This species is endemic to Australia.
