= Goweroconcha wilsoni =

Scientific classification
- Domain: Eukaryota
- Kingdom: Animalia
- Phylum: Mollusca
- Class: Gastropoda
- Order: Stylommatophora
- Family: Charopidae
- Subfamily: Charopinae
- Genus: Goweroconcha
- Species: G. wilsoni

Binomial name
- Goweroconcha wilsoni Iredale, 1944
- Location of Lord Howe Island

Species of land snail

Goweroconcha wilsoni, also known as Gower Wilson's pinwheel snail, is a species of air-breathing land snail, a terrestrial pulmonate gastropod mollusc in the pinwheel snail family, that is endemic to Australia's Lord Howe Island in the Tasman Sea.

== Description ==
The shell of the snail is 4.4–5.3 mm in height, with a diameter of 9–11 mm. The colour is dark reddish-brown with zigzagging cream flammulations (flame-like markings). The shape is discoidal with a flat to slightly sunken spire, rounded whorls, impressed sutures, and with prominent, sinuous, moderately closely-spaced radial ribs. The umbilicus is widely open. The aperture is roundly lunate. The animal has a dark grey to black body.

== Distribution and habitat ==
The snail occurs on the summits and upper slopes of Mount Lidgbird and Mount Gower, where it is found in moist woodland and rainforest, inhabiting plant litter beneath logs and fallen palm fronds.
