= Palline micramyla =

Conservation status
- Data Deficient (IUCN 2.3)

Scientific classification
- Kingdom: Animalia
- Phylum: Mollusca
- Class: Gastropoda
- Order: Stylommatophora
- Family: Charopidae
- Genus: Palline
- Species: P. micramyla

Binomial name
- Palline micramyla Solem, 1983

Species of gastropod

Palline micramyla is a species of small air-breathing land snails, terrestrial pulmonate gastropod molluscs in the family Charopidae. This species is endemic to Micronesia.
