= Allocharopa =

Scientific classification
- Domain: Eukaryota
- Kingdom: Animalia
- Phylum: Mollusca
- Class: Gastropoda
- Order: Stylommatophora
- Family: Charopidae
- Subfamily: Charopinae
- Genus: Allocharopa

Genus of gastropods

Allocharopa is a genus of very small air-breathing land snails, terrestrial pulmonate gastropod mollusks in the family Charopidae.

== Species ==
Species within the genus Allocharopa include:

- Allocharopa erskinensis
- Allocharopa okeana
- Allocharopa tarravillensis
