= Hedleyoconcha ailaketoae =

Conservation status
- Vulnerable (IUCN 2.3)

Scientific classification
- Kingdom: Animalia
- Phylum: Mollusca
- Class: Gastropoda
- Order: Stylommatophora
- Family: Charopidae
- Genus: Hedleyoconcha
- Species: H. ailaketoae

Binomial name
- Hedleyoconcha ailaketoae Stanisic, 1990

Species of gastropod

Hedleyoconcha ailaketoae is a species of small air-breathing land snails, terrestrial pulmonate gastropod mollusks in the family Charopidae.

This species is endemic to Australia.
