= Palikirus cosmetus =

Conservation status
- Data Deficient (IUCN 2.3)

Scientific classification
- Kingdom: Animalia
- Phylum: Mollusca
- Class: Gastropoda
- Order: Stylommatophora
- Family: Charopidae
- Genus: Palikirus
- Species: P. cosmetus

Binomial name
- Palikirus cosmetus Solem, 1983

Species of gastropod

Palikirus cosmetus is a species of air-breathing land snail, a terrestrial pulmonate gastropod mollusc in the family Charopidae. This species is endemic to Micronesia.
