= Gerontia =

Gerontia may refer to:

- Gerontia (gastropod) Hutton, 1882, a genus of snails in the family Charopidae
- Gerontia (moth) Schaus, 1904, a genus of moths in the family Megalopygidae
- Gerontia (island), an island of Greece
