= Geminoropa scindocataracta =

Conservation status
- Vulnerable (IUCN 2.3)

Scientific classification
- Kingdom: Animalia
- Phylum: Mollusca
- Class: Gastropoda
- Order: Stylommatophora
- Family: Charopidae
- Genus: Geminoropa
- Species: G. scindocataracta

Binomial name
- Geminoropa scindocataracta (Gabriel, 1930)

Species of gastropod

Geminoropa scindocataracta is a species of small air-breathing land snails, terrestrial pulmonate gastropod mollusks in the family Charopidae. This species is endemic to Australia.
