= Pseudohelenoconcha spurca =

Conservation status
- Extinct (IUCN 2.3)

Scientific classification
- Kingdom: Animalia
- Phylum: Mollusca
- Class: Gastropoda
- Order: Stylommatophora
- Family: Charopidae
- Genus: †Pseudohelenoconcha
- Species: †P. spurca

Binomial name
- †Pseudohelenoconcha spurca (Sowerby I, 1844)

Synonyms
- Pseudocampylaea dianae (Pfeiffer, 1856); Pseudocampylaea laetissima (Smith, 1892); Pseudocampylaea persoluta (Smith, 1892); Pseudocampylaea spurca (Sowerby, 1844)

Extinct species of gastropod

Pseudohelenoconcha spurca is an extinct species of small air-breathing land snail, a terrestrial pulmonate gastropod mollusk in the family Endodontidae.

This species was found only in Saint Helena, an island in the middle of the south Atlantic. This species is now considered to be extinct.
