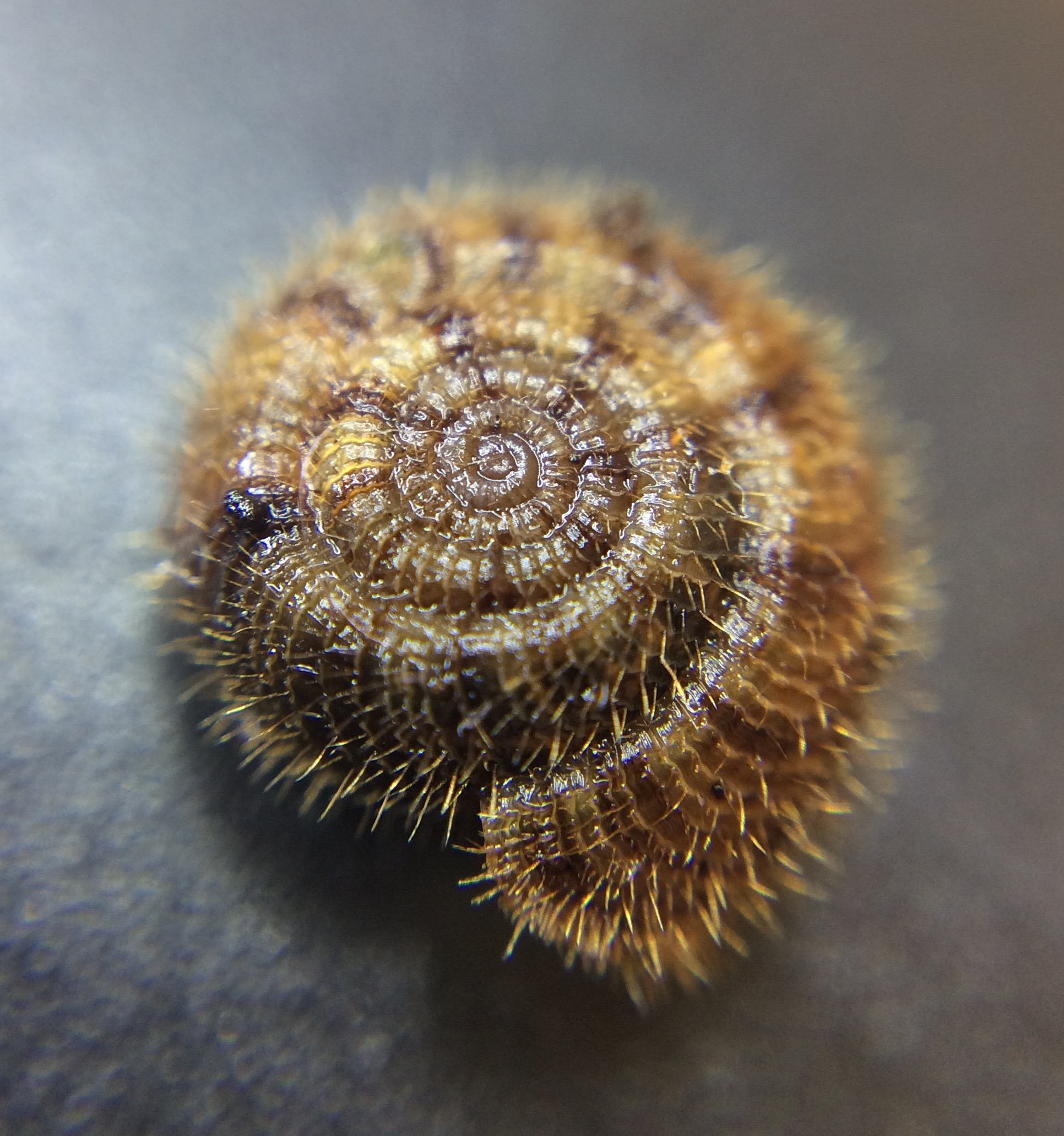

Scientific classification
- Domain: Eukaryota
- Kingdom: Animalia
- Phylum: Mollusca
- Class: Gastropoda
- Order: Stylommatophora
- Family: Charopidae
- Genus: Suteria
- Species: S. ide

Binomial name
- Suteria ide (Gray, 1850)

= Suteria ide =

Species of gastropod

Suteria ide is a species of air-breathing land snail, a terrestrial gastropod mollusc in the family Charopidae (Marshall, 2015).This species is endemic to New Zealand.

== Description ==
The shell of this species reaches 9 mm wide and 4.5 mm high (Powell, 1979). The shells are covered in short bristles, which reduce the amount of excess soil and water adhering to the shell (Brockie, 2013).

== Habitat ==
Suteria ide lives in microcavities in the ground, or under logs and dead leaves (Solem et al. 1981). These snails can be found in the North Island and the upper half of the South Island of New Zealand.
