= Oreokera cumulus =

Conservation status
- Data Deficient (IUCN 2.3)

Scientific classification
- Kingdom: Animalia
- Phylum: Mollusca
- Class: Gastropoda
- Order: Stylommatophora
- Family: Charopidae
- Genus: Oreokera
- Species: O. cumulus

Binomial name
- Oreokera cumulus (Odhner, 1917)

Species of gastropod

Oreokera cumulus is a species of air-breathing land snail, a terrestrial pulmonate gastropod mollusk in the family Charopidae. This species is endemic to Australia.
