= Austenia =

Austenia may refer to:

- Austenia (gastropod), a genus of gastropods in the family Helicarionidae
- Austenia, a genus of gastropods in the family Charopidae, synonym of Ruthvenia
- Austenia, a genus of flies in the family Tabanidae, synonym of Haematopota
- Austenia, a genus of grasshoppers in the family Acrinidae, synonym of Caryanda
