= Cralopa kaputarensis =

Conservation status
- Data Deficient (IUCN 2.3)

Scientific classification
- Kingdom: Animalia
- Phylum: Mollusca
- Class: Gastropoda
- Order: Stylommatophora
- Family: Charopidae
- Genus: Cralopa
- Species: C. kaputarensis

Binomial name
- Cralopa kaputarensis Stanisic, 1990

Species of gastropod

Cralopa kaputarensis is a species of land snail in the Charopidae family. It is endemic to Australia and known from New South Wales. The specific name refers to its type locality, Mount Kaputar.
