= Goweroconcha waterhousiae =

Scientific classification
- Kingdom: Animalia
- Phylum: Mollusca
- Class: Gastropoda
- Order: Stylommatophora
- Family: Charopidae
- Subfamily: Charopinae
- Genus: Goweroconcha
- Species: G. waterhousiae

Binomial name
- Goweroconcha waterhousiae (Hedley, 1897)
- Location of Lord Howe Island

Synonyms
- Endodonta waterhousiae Hedley, 1897

Species of land snail

Goweroconcha waterhousiae, also known as the cinnamon-zigzag pinwheel snail, is a species of air-breathing land snail, a terrestrial pulmonate gastropod mollusc in the pinwheel snail family, that is endemic to Australia's Lord Howe Island in the Tasman Sea.

== Description ==
The shell of the snail is 3.3–4.2 mm in height, with a diameter of 7.4–8.1 mm. The colour is dark reddish-brown with zigzagging cream flammulations (flame-like markings). The shape is discoidal with a flat to slightly sunken spire, rounded whorls, impressed sutures, and with moderately closely-spaced radial ribs. The umbilicus is widely open. The aperture is roundly lunate with a flattened upper edge. The animal is cream to pale grey, with a pink head, dark grey to black eyestalks, and with two dark bands along the neck.

== Distribution and habitat ==
The snail is common and widespread in the lowlands of the island, where it is found in moist woodland and rainforest, in plant litter beneath logs and fallen palm fronds.
