= Zilchogyra paulistana =

Conservation status
- Critically Endangered (IUCN 2.3)

Scientific classification
- Kingdom: Animalia
- Phylum: Mollusca
- Class: Gastropoda
- Order: Stylommatophora
- Family: Charopidae
- Genus: Zilchogyra
- Species: Z. paulistana

Binomial name
- Zilchogyra paulistana Scott, 1973

Species of gastropod

Zilchogyra paulistana is a species of air-breathing land snail, a terrestrial pulmonate gastropod mollusk in the family Helicodiscidae.

== Distribution ==
This species is endemic to Brazil.
