= Jokajdon tumidulus =

Conservation status
- Data Deficient (IUCN 2.3)

Scientific classification
- Kingdom: Animalia
- Phylum: Mollusca
- Class: Gastropoda
- Order: Stylommatophora
- Family: Charopidae
- Genus: Jokajdon
- Species: J. tumidulus

Binomial name
- Jokajdon tumidulus (Möllendorff, 1900)

Species of gastropod

Jokajdon tumidulus is a species of small air-breathing land snails, terrestrial pulmonate gastropod mollusks in the family Charopidae. This species is endemic to Micronesia.
