= Gyropena minuta =

Scientific classification
- Kingdom: Animalia
- Phylum: Mollusca
- Class: Gastropoda
- Order: Stylommatophora
- Family: Charopidae
- Subfamily: Charopinae
- Genus: Gyropena
- Species: G. minuta

Binomial name
- Gyropena minuta Shea & Griffiths, 2010
- Location of Lord Howe Island

Species of land snail

Gyropena minuta, also known as the Mount Gower pinwheel snail, is a species of air-breathing land snail, a terrestrial pulmonate gastropod mollusc in the pinwheel snail family, that is endemic to Australia's Lord Howe Island in the Tasman Sea.

== Description ==
The shell of the snail is 0.9 mm in height, with a diameter of 1.9 mm. The colour is golden-brown. The shape is discoidal with a low spire, shouldered whorls, impressed sutures, and with prominent, moderately widely spaced radial ribs. The umbilicus is widely open. The aperture is roundly lunate. The animal is unknown.

== Distribution and habitat ==
This rare snail is found at the southern end of the island on the summits and slopes of Mount Lidgbird and Mount Gower, inhabiting plant litter.
