= Pillomena aemula =

Conservation status
- Near Threatened (IUCN 2.3)

Scientific classification
- Kingdom: Animalia
- Phylum: Mollusca
- Class: Gastropoda
- Order: Stylommatophora
- Family: Charopidae
- Genus: Pillomena
- Species: P. aemula

Binomial name
- Pillomena aemula Tate, 1884

Species of gastropod

Pillomena aemula is a species of small air-breathing land snail, a terrestrial pulmonate gastropod mollusc in the family Charopidae. This species is endemic to Australia.
