= Dipnelix pertricosa =

Conservation status
- Data Deficient (IUCN 2.3)

Scientific classification
- Kingdom: Animalia
- Phylum: Mollusca
- Class: Gastropoda
- Order: Stylommatophora
- Family: Charopidae
- Genus: Dipnelix
- Species: D. pertricosa

Binomial name
- Dipnelix pertricosa Iredale, 1937

Species of gastropod

Dipnelix pertricosa is a species of air-breathing land snail, a terrestrial gastropod mollusk in the family Charopidae. This species is endemic to Australia.
