= Hedleyoconcha addita =

Scientific classification
- Kingdom: Animalia
- Phylum: Mollusca
- Class: Gastropoda
- Order: Stylommatophora
- Family: Charopidae
- Genus: Hedleyoconcha
- Species: H. addita

Binomial name
- Hedleyoconcha addita (Iredale, 1944)
- Location of Lord Howe Island

Species of land snail

Hedleyoconcha addita, also known as the Lord Howe Island conical pinwheel snail, is a species of pinwheel snail that is endemic to Australia's Lord Howe Island in the Tasman Sea.

== Description ==
The trochoidal shell of adult snails is 5.6 mm in height, with a diameter of 7 mm, with a high conical spire, flat sutures and whorls rounded with a keeled edge. It is smooth and pale golden-brown. The umbilicus is narrowly open, partly concealed by the reflected lip of the roundly lunate aperture.

== Habitat ==
The snail is only found on the southern end of the island, on the summit of Mount Gower and nearby ledges.
