= Palikirus ponapicus =

Conservation status
- Data Deficient (IUCN 2.3)

Scientific classification
- Kingdom: Animalia
- Phylum: Mollusca
- Class: Gastropoda
- Order: Stylommatophora
- Family: Charopidae
- Genus: Palikirus
- Species: P. ponapicus

Binomial name
- Palikirus ponapicus (Möllendorff, 1900)

Species of gastropod

Palikirus ponapicus is a species of air-breathing land snail, a terrestrial pulmonate gastropod mollusc in the family Charopidae. This species is endemic to Micronesia.
