= Pilula praetumida =

Conservation status
- Vulnerable (IUCN 2.3)

Scientific classification
- Kingdom: Animalia
- Phylum: Mollusca
- Class: Gastropoda
- Order: Stylommatophora
- Family: Charopidae
- Genus: Pilula
- Species: P. praetumida

Binomial name
- Pilula praetumida (Morelet, 1860)

Species of gastropod

Pilula praetumida is a species of small air-breathing land snail, a terrestrial pulmonate gastropod mollusk in the family Charopidae. This species is endemic to Réunion.
