= Discocharopa =

Scientific classification
- Kingdom: Animalia
- Phylum: Mollusca
- Class: Gastropoda
- Order: Stylommatophora
- Family: Charopidae
- Genus: Discocharopa; Iredale, 1913

Genus of gastropods

Discocharopa is a genus of small air-breathing land snails, terrestrial pulmonate gastropod mollusks in the family Charopidae.

== Species ==
The World Register of Marine Species accepts the following species within Discocharopa:

- Discocharopa aperta (Möllendorff, 1888)
- Discocharopa concentrivolva J. Stanisic, 2010
- Discocharopa expandivolva J. Stanisic, 2010
- Discocharopa pexa (J. C. Cox, 1868)
- Discocharopa planulata Solem, 1959
- Discocharopa stenomphala J. Stanisic, 2010
- Discocharopa werneri Solem, 1957
