= Pulcharopa =

Scientific classification
- Kingdom: Animalia
- Phylum: Mollusca
- Class: Gastropoda
- Order: Stylommatophora
- Superfamily: Punctoidea
- Family: Charopidae
- Subfamily: Charopinae
- Genus: Pulcharopa; Iredale, 1944

Genus of land snails

Pulcharopa is a monotypic genus of pinwheel snails that is endemic to Australia's Lord Howe Island in the Tasman Sea.

The only species is P. plesa, also known as the fiery-bangled pinwheel snail.

== Description ==
The ear-shaped shell of mature snails is 1.9–2.5 mm in height, with a diameter of 3.5–4.2 mm, discoidal with a very low spire, widely spaced ribs and impressed sutures. It is orange-brown with zigzag, cream-coloured flammulations (flame-like markings). The umbilicus is moderately wide. The aperture is ovately lunate. The animal is unknown as it has never been collected alive.

== Distribution and habitat ==
The snail is known only from the lowlands of the northern part of the island.
