= Ngairea =

Scientific classification
- Kingdom: Animalia
- Phylum: Mollusca
- Class: Gastropoda
- Order: Stylommatophora
- Family: Charopidae
- Subfamily: Charopinae
- Genus: Ngairea; Stanisic, 1990

Type species
- Oreokera dorrigoensis Iredale, 1941

Genus of gastropods

Ngairea is a genus of small air-breathing land snails, terrestrial pulmonate gastropod mollusks in the family Charopidae.

== Species ==
Species within the genus Ngairea include:

- Ngairea canaliculata Stanisic, 1990
- Ngairea corticicola (Cox, 1866)
- Ngairea dorrigoensis (Iredale, 1941)
- Ngairea levicostata Stanisic, 1990
- Ngairea murphyi (Cox, 1864)
