= Setomedea =

Scientific classification
- Kingdom: Animalia
- Phylum: Mollusca
- Class: Gastropoda
- Order: Stylommatophora
- Family: Charopidae
- Genus: Setomedea; Iredale, 1941

Genus of gastropods

Setomedea is a genus of small air-breathing land snails, terrestrial pulmonate gastropod mollusks in the family Charopidae.

== Species ==
The genus Setomedea includes four species.

- Setomedea janae
- Setomedea monteithi
- Setomedea nudicostata
- Setomedea seticostata
