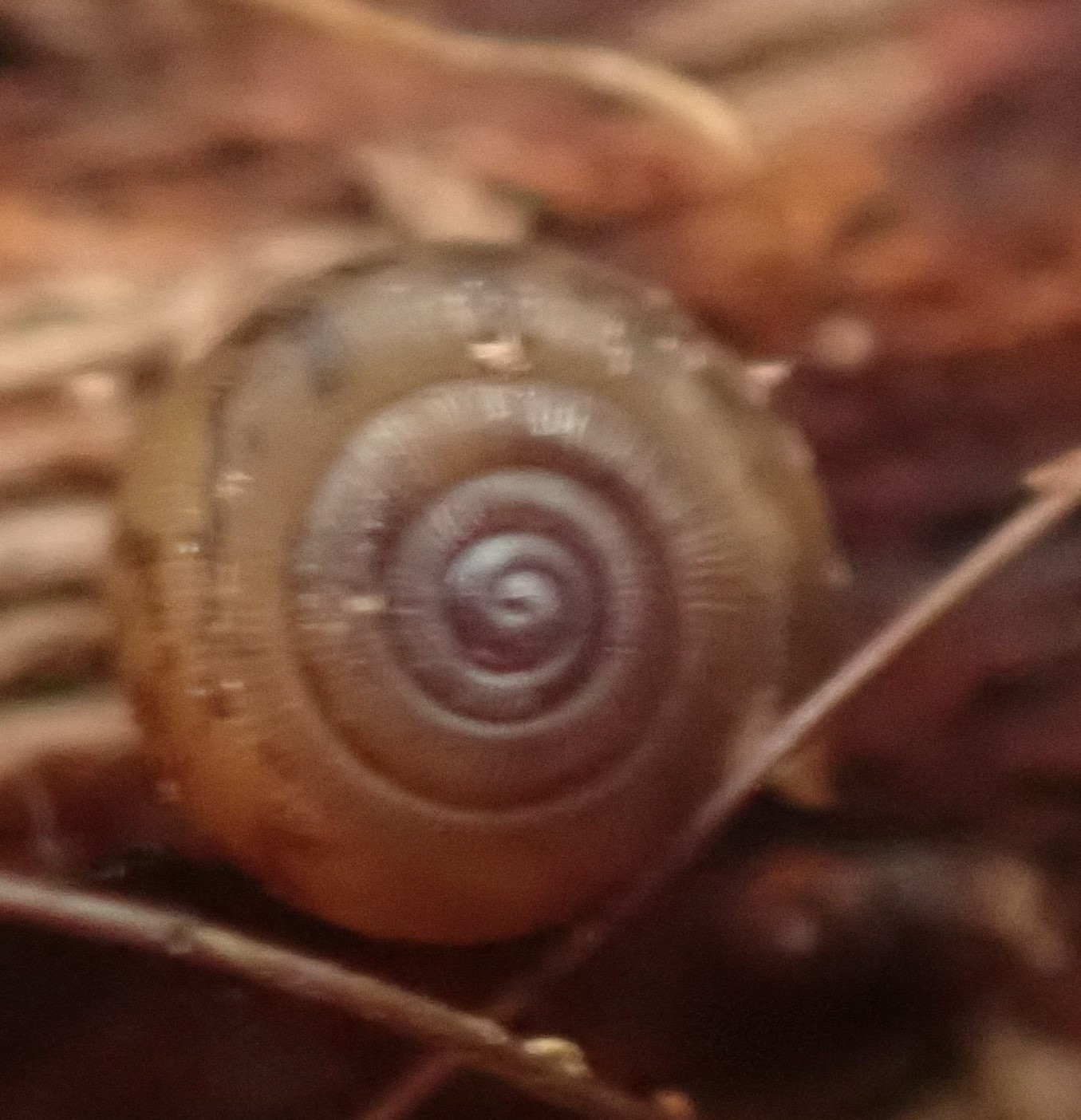
- Oreomava johnstoni

Scientific classification
- Kingdom: Animalia
- Phylum: Mollusca
- Class: Gastropoda
- Order: Stylommatophora
- Family: Charopidae
- Genus: Oreomava; Iredale, 1933

= Oreomava =

Genus of gastropods

Oreomava is a genus of small air-breathing land snails, terrestrial pulmonate gastropod mollusks in the family Charopidae.

== Species ==
Species within the genus Oreomava include:

- Oreomava cannfluviatilus
- Oreomava otwayensis
