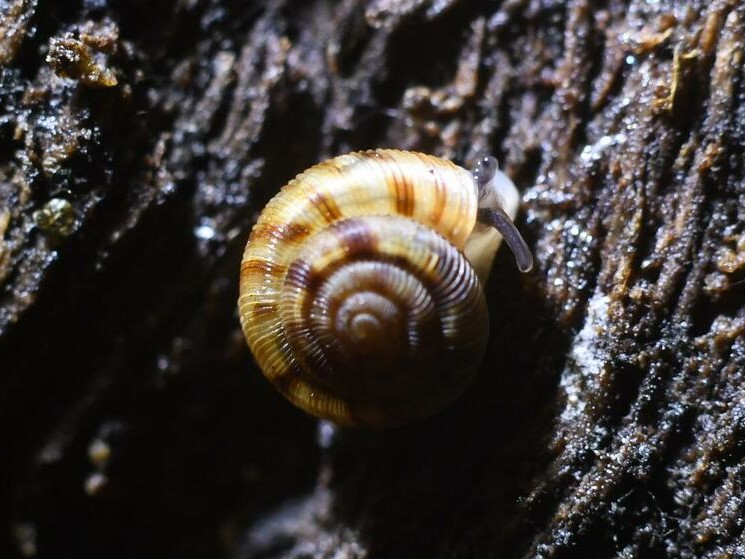
- Pernagera albanensis

Scientific classification
- Kingdom: Animalia
- Phylum: Mollusca
- Class: Gastropoda
- Order: Stylommatophora
- Family: Charopidae
- Genus: Pernagera; Iredale, 1933

= Pernagera =

Genus of gastropods

Pernagera is a genus of small air-breathing land snails, terrestrial pulmonate gastropod mollusks in the family Charopidae.

== Species ==
The following two species are recognised in the genus Pernagera:

- Pernagera albanensis (J. C. Cox, 1868)
- Pernagera lena Iredale, 1939
