= Corinomala =

Scientific classification
- Kingdom: Animalia
- Phylum: Mollusca
- Class: Gastropoda
- Order: Stylommatophora
- Family: Charopidae
- Subfamily: Charopinae
- Genus: Corinomala; Iredale, 1939

Synonyms
- Pilsbrycharopa Solem, 1958

Genus of gastropods

Corinomala is a genus of land snails in the family Charopidae.

== Species ==
There are eight recognized species:

- Corinomala baliana (B. Rensch, 1930)
- Corinomala brunnescens (Möllendorff, 1902)
- Corinomala densecostulata (Thiele, 1928)
- Corinomala gressitti (Solem, 1970)
- Corinomala kobelti (C. R. Boettger, 1908)
- Corinomala nigrofusca (E. A. Smith, 1896)
- Corinomala timorensis (B. Rensch, 1935)
- Corinomala tumida (Odhner, 1917)
