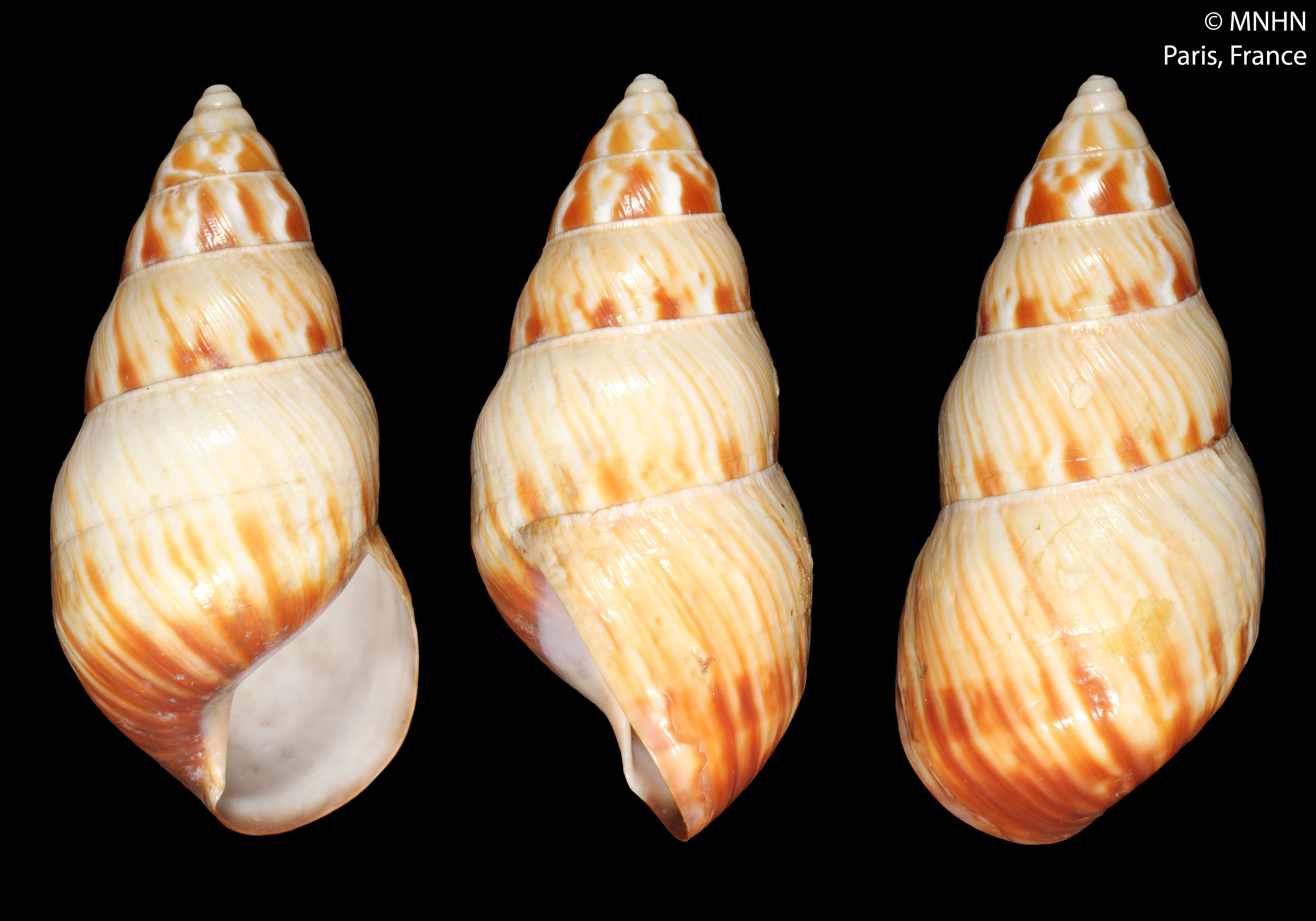
- Shell of Flammulina zebra (syntype at MNHN, Paris)

Scientific classification
- Kingdom: Animalia
- Phylum: Mollusca
- Class: Gastropoda
- Order: Stylommatophora
- Superfamily: Punctoidea
- Family: Charopidae
- Subfamily: Flammulininae
- Genus: Flammulina; E. von Martens, 1873

Type species
- Vitrina zebra Le Guillou, 1842

Synonyms
- Amphidoxa (Calymna) Hutton, 1883 (invalid - not Huebner, 1816 (homonym)); Flammulina (Calymna) Hutton, 1883

= Flammulina (gastropod) =

Genus of gastropods

Flammulina is a genus of very small air-breathing land snails, terrestrial pulmonate gastropod mollusks in the subfamily Flammulininae of the family Charopidae.

== Species ==
Species within the genus Flammulina include:

- Flammulina albozonata N. Gardner, 1969
- Flammulina chiron (Gray, 1850)
- Flammulina cornea (Hutton, 1882)
- Flammulina crebriflammea (Reeve, 1852)
- Flammulina feredayi (Suter, 1891)
- Flammulina festiva Hylton Scott, 1970
- Flammulina jacquenetta (Hutton, 1883)
- Flammulina lateaperta Dell, 1955
- Flammulina olivacea (Suter, 1892)
- Flammulina perdita (Hutton, 1883)
- Flammulina tepakiensis N. Gardner, 1977
- Flammulina zebra (Le Guillou, 1842)
