= Diphyoropa =

Scientific classification
- Kingdom: Animalia
- Phylum: Mollusca
- Class: Gastropoda
- Order: Stylommatophora
- Family: Charopidae
- Genus: Diphyoropa; Hyman & Stanisic, 2005

Genus of land snails

Diphyoropa is a genus of pinwheel snails that is endemic to Australia.

== Species ==
- Diphyoropa illustra (Gabriel, 1947)
- Diphyoropa jonesi Stanisic, 2010
- Diphyoropa macleayana Hyman & Stanisic, 2005
- Diphyoropa saturni (Cox, 1864)
