= Pseudohelenoconcha =

Scientific classification
- Kingdom: Animalia
- Phylum: Mollusca
- Class: Gastropoda
- Order: Stylommatophora
- Family: Charopidae
- Genus: †Pseudohelenoconcha; Germain, 1932

Type species
- Helix spurca G. B. Sowerby I, 1844

Genus of gastropods

†Pseudohelenoconcha was a genus of air-breathing land snails, shell-less terrestrial pulmonate gastropod mollusks in the subfamily Trachycystinae of the family Charopidae.

== Nomenclature ==
Not available (no type species designated) from Germain, 1931, Comptes-Rendus du Congrès des Sociétés savantes en 1929, Sciences: 166

== Species ==
Species in the genus Pseudohelenoconcha included:

- Pseudohelenoconcha dianae (L. Pfeiffer, 1856)
- Pseudohelenoconcha laetissima (E. A. Smith, 1892)
- Pseudohelenoconcha persoluta (E. A. Smith, 1892)
- Pseudohelenoconcha spurca (G. B. Sowerby I, 1844)
