= Gyropena =

Scientific classification
- Kingdom: Animalia
- Phylum: Mollusca
- Class: Gastropoda
- Order: Stylommatophora
- Superfamily: Punctoidea
- Family: Charopidae
- Subfamily: Charopinae
- Genus: Gyropena; Iredale, 1944

Genus of land snails

Gyropena is a genus of two species of tiny pinwheel snails that are endemic to Australia's Lord Howe Island in the Tasman Sea.

== Species ==
- Gyropena minuta Shea & Griffiths, 2010 – Mount Gower pinwheel snail
- Gyropena verans Iredale, 1944 – sunken-spired pinwheel snail

== Description ==
The shells of these snails are 0.9–1.5 mm in height, with a diameter of 1.9–2.9 mm. The colour is golden-brown to pale fawn. The shape is discoidal with a low or sunken spire, whorls shouldered and sutures impressed, with prominent radial ribs. The umbilicus is widely open. The aperture is roundly lunate.

== Habitat ==
These snails are found at the southern end of the island, on the summits and slopes of Mount Lidgbird and Mount Gower, in leaf litter.
