= Trukcharopa =

Scientific classification
- Kingdom: Animalia
- Phylum: Mollusca
- Class: Gastropoda
- Order: Stylommatophora
- Family: Charopidae
- Genus: Trukcharopa; Solem, 1983

Genus of gastropods

Trukcharopa is a genus of small, air-breathing land snails, terrestrial pulmonate gastropod mollusks in the family Charopidae. The only description of this genus and its sole representative species, Trukcharopa trukana, comes from Alan Solem in 1982.

== Species ==
Species within the genus Trukcharopa include:

- Trukcharopa trukana
