= Oreokera =

Scientific classification
- Kingdom: Animalia
- Phylum: Mollusca
- Class: Gastropoda
- Order: Stylommatophora
- Family: Charopidae
- Genus: Oreokera; Iredale, 1933

Genus of gastropods

Oreokera is a genus of small air-breathing land snails, terrestrial pulmonate gastropod mollusks in the superfamily Punctoidea (according to the taxonomy of the Gastropoda by Bouchet & Rocroi, 2005).

== Species ==
Species within the genus Oreokera include:

- Oreokera cumulus
- Oreokera nimbus
