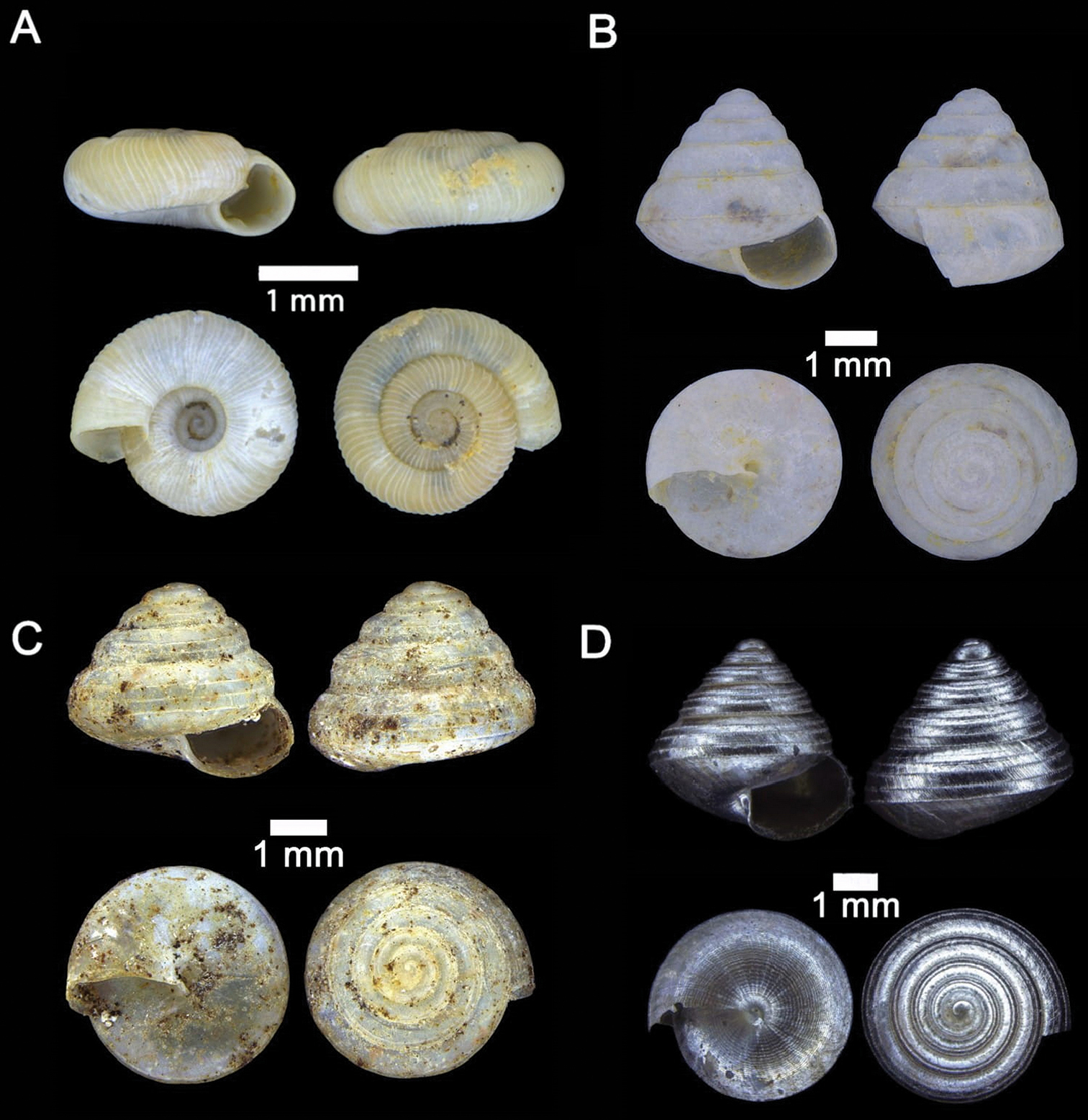
- Philalanka species

Scientific classification
- Kingdom: Animalia
- Phylum: Mollusca
- Class: Gastropoda
- Order: Stylommatophora
- Family: Charopidae
- Subfamily: Thysanotinae
- Genus: Philalanka; Godwin-Austen, 1898

= Philalanka =

Genus of molluscs

Philalanka is a genus of gastropods belonging to the family Charopidae.

The species of this genus are found in Southeastern Asia.

Species:

- Philalanka anomphala Vermeulen, Liew & Schilthuizen, 2015
- Philalanka batuensis Godwin-Austen, 1907
- Philalanka bhutana E.Gittenberger, Gyeltshen & Sherub, 2021
- Philalanka bidenticulata (Benson, 1852)
- Philalanka bilirata (W.T.Blanford & H.F.Blanford, 1861)
- Philalanka bismarckiana I.Rensch, 1932
- Philalanka bolampattiensis Godwin-Austen, 1898
- Philalanka camerunensis Thiele, 1931
- Philalanka carinifera (Stoliczka, 1873)
- Philalanka carinigera (Tapparone Canefri, 1886)
- Philalanka circumsculpta Sykes, 1897
- Philalanka daghoba (W.T.Blanford & H.F.Blanford, 1861)
- Philalanka delicata Thiele, 1931
- Philalanka depressa (Preston, 1909)
- Philalanka depressispira Vermeulen, 1996
- Philalanka diminuta B.Rensch, 1932
- Philalanka edithae (Preston, 1909)
- Philalanka febrilis (W.T.Blanford & H.F.Blanford, 1861)
- Philalanka floweri Godwin-Austen, 1907
- Philalanka homfrayi (Godwin-Austen, 1895)
- Philalanka jambusanensis Marzuki, T.S.Liew & Mohd-Azlan, 2021
- Philalanka kusana (Aldrich, 1889)
- Philalanka lamcabensis Jousseaume, 1894
- Philalanka lieftincki van Benthem Jutting, 1953
- Philalanka liratula (L.Pfeiffer, 1860)
- Philalanka malimgunung Vermeulen, Liew & Schilthuizen, 2015
- Philalanka micromphala van Benthem Jutting, 1952
- Philalanka moluensis (E.A.Smith, 1893)
- Philalanka mononema (Benson, 1853)
- Philalanka nannophya B.Rensch, 1932
- Philalanka notabilis (Sykes, 1897)
- Philalanka obscura Vermeulen, Liew & Schilthuizen, 2015
- Philalanka pirrieana (Reeve, 1854)
- Philalanka pusilla Maassen, 2000
- Philalanka quinquelirata Gude, 1914
- Philalanka rugulosa Vermeulen, Liew & Schilthuizen, 2015
- Philalanka secessa Godwin-Austen, 1898
- Philalanka setifera Vermeulen, 1996
- Philalanka sinhila (Godwin-Austen, 1897)
- Philalanka subbilirata (Godwin-Austen, 1882)
- Philalanka tambunanensis Vermeulen, Liew & Schilthuizen, 2015
- Philalanka tertiana (W.T.Blanford & H.F.Blanford, 1861)
- Philalanka thienemanni B.Rensch, 1932
- Philalanka thwaitesi (L.Pfeiffer, 1854)
- Philalanka tjibodasensis (Leschke, 1914)
- Philalanka tricarinata (W.T.Blanford & H.F.Blanford, 1861)
- Philalanka trifilosa (L.Pfeiffer, 1854)
