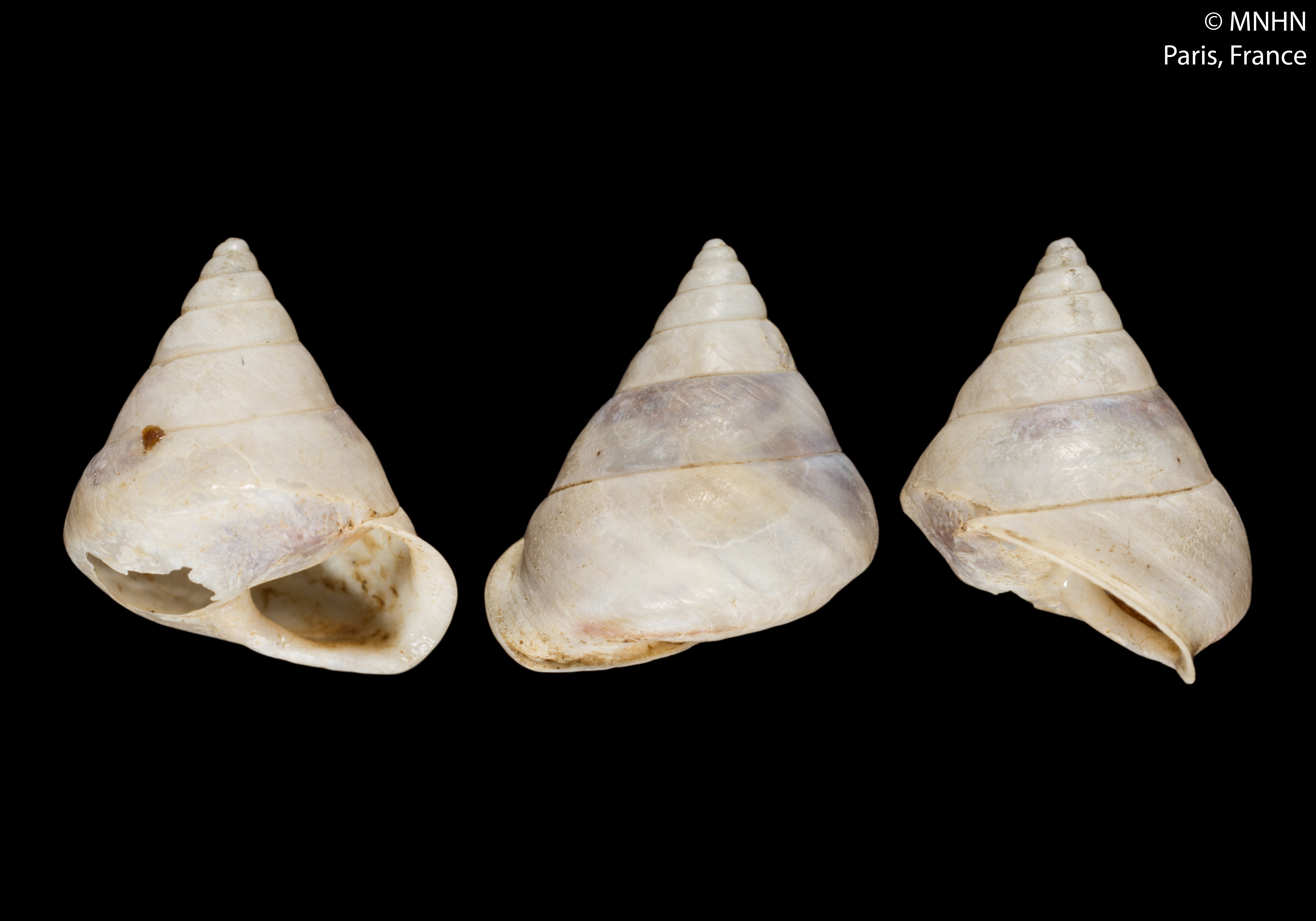
- Shell of Andrefrancia dispersa (syntype at MNHN, Paris)

Scientific classification
- Kingdom: Animalia
- Phylum: Mollusca
- Class: Gastropoda
- Order: Stylommatophora
- Superfamily: Punctoidea
- Family: Charopidae
- Subfamily: Charopinae
- Genus: Andrefrancia; Solem, 1960

Type species
- Helix rhizophorarum Gassies, 1865

= Andrefrancia =

Genus of gastropods

Andrefrancia is a genus of very small air-breathing land snails, terrestrial pulmonate gastropod mollusks in the subfamily Charopinae of the family Charopidae.

== Species ==
Species within the genus Andrefrancia include:

- Andrefrancia alveolus (Gassies, 1881)
- Andrefrancia amoana Pawłowska-Banasiak, 2008
- Andrefrancia angustiumbilicata Pawłowska-Banasiak, 2008
- Andrefrancia bazini (Crosse, 1874)
- Andrefrancia berlierei (Crosse, 1875)
- Andrefrancia blemou Pawłowska-Banasiak, 2008
- Andrefrancia bourailensis (Gassies, 1872)
- Andrefrancia calliope (Crosse, 1869)
- Andrefrancia canaliculata Pawłowska-Banasiak, 2008
- Andrefrancia cockerelli Solem, 1960
- Andrefrancia coerulea Pawłowska-Banasiak, 2008
- Andrefrancia compressa Pawłowska-Banasiak, 2008
- Andrefrancia confinis (Gassies, 1875)
- Andrefrancia costulifera (Pfeiffer, 1854)
- Andrefrancia cressoniana Pawłowska-Banasiak, 2008
- Andrefrancia cryptodon Pawłowska-Banasiak, 2008
- Andrefrancia decreta (Gassies, 1871)
- Andrefrancia densicostata Pawłowska-Banasiak, 2008
- Andrefrancia derbesiana (Crosse, 1875)
- Andrefrancia dispersa (Gassies, 1863)
- Andrefrancia goanna Pawłowska-Banasiak, 2008
- Andrefrancia gwendolinae (Preston, 1907)
- Andrefrancia incipiens Pawłowska-Banasiak, 2008
- Andrefrancia kaala Pawłowska-Banasiak, 2008
- Andrefrancia khedeigneana Pawłowska-Banasiak, 2008
- Andrefrancia kouvneleana Pawłowska-Banasiak, 2008
- Andrefrancia kuenthiana Pawłowska-Banasiak, 2008
- Andrefrancia lifuana (Gude, 1905)
- Andrefrancia mamieana Pawłowska-Banasiak, 2008
- Andrefrancia mandjeliana Pawłowska-Banasiak, 2008
- Andrefrancia melaleucarum (Gassies, 1872)
- Andrefrancia memaoyana Pawłowska-Banasiak, 2008
- Andrefrancia miracidium Pawłowska-Banasiak, 2008
- Andrefrancia noumeensis (Crosse, 1870)
- Andrefrancia ostiolum (Crosse, 1870)
- Andrefrancia perspectiva Pawłowska-Banasiak, 2008
- Andrefrancia pinicola (Pfeiffer, 1854)
- Andrefrancia planispira Pawłowska-Banasiak, 2008
- Andrefrancia quadrilamellata Pawłowska-Banasiak, 2008
- Andrefrancia reducisculpta Pawłowska-Banasiak, 2008
- Andrefrancia rotunda Pawłowska-Banasiak, 2008
- Andrefrancia rusticula (Gassies, 1859)
- Andrefrancia saburra (Gassies, 1874)
- Andrefrancia setosa Pawłowska-Banasiak, 2008
- Andrefrancia subcoacta (Gassies, 1870)
- Andrefrancia tandjiana Pawłowska-Banasiak, 2008
- Andrefrancia taslei (Crosse, 1874)
- Andrefrancia tiabetus Pawłowska-Banasiak, 2008
- Andrefrancia tillieriana Pawłowska-Banasiak, 2008
- Andrefrancia tondeuana Pawłowska-Banasiak, 2008
- Andrefrancia tuberculata Pawłowska-Banasiak, 2008
- Andrefrancia vaoana Pawłowska-Banasiak, 2008
- Andrefrancia vetula (Gassies, 1858)
- Andrefrancia vincentina (Crosse, 1870)
- Andrefrancia webbi Pawłowska-Banasiak, 2008

Species brought into synonymy

- Andrefrancia rhizophorarum (Gassies, 1865): synonym of Andrefrancia vetula (Gassies, 1858) (junior synonym)
