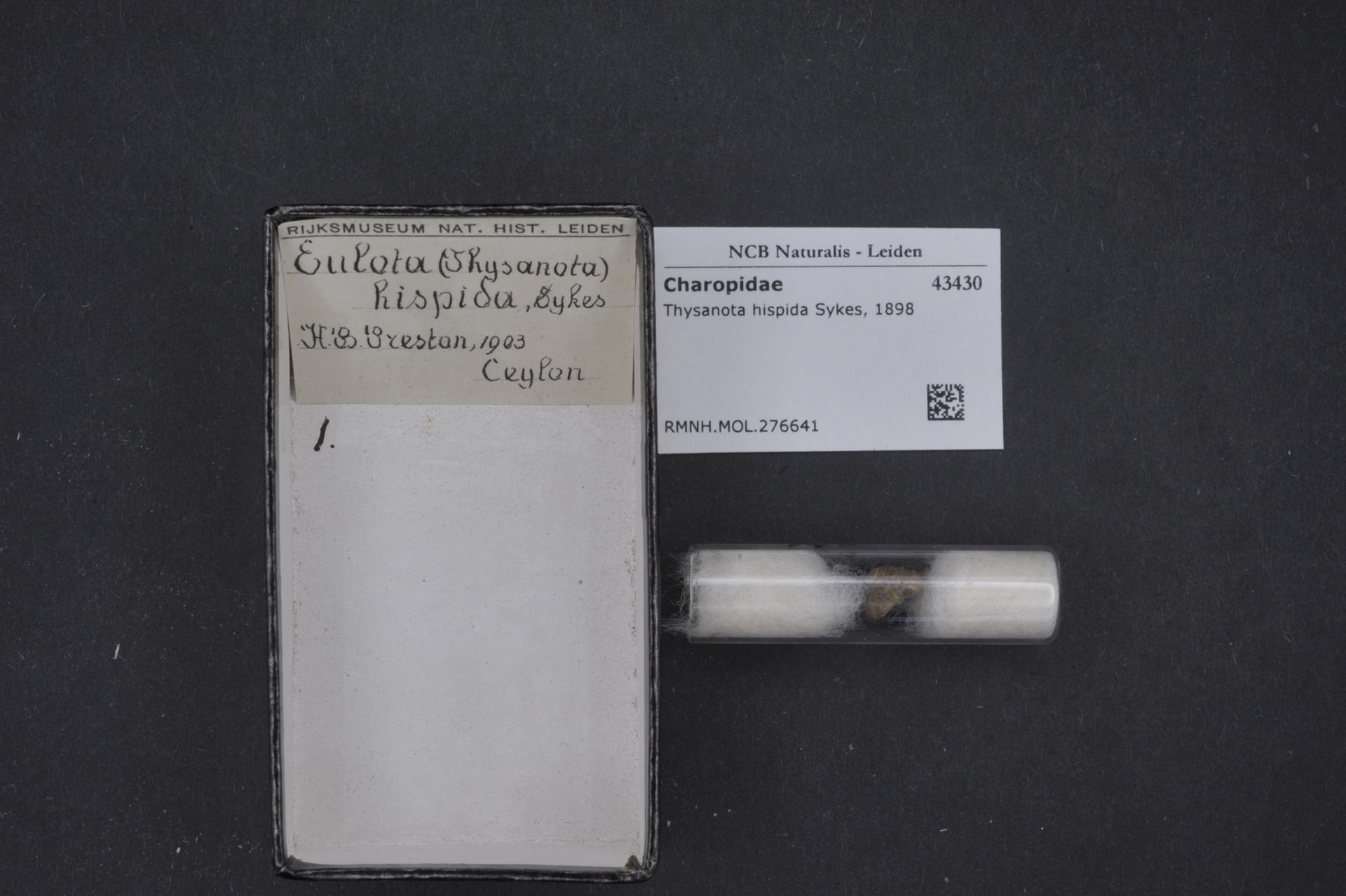

Scientific classification
- Kingdom: Animalia
- Phylum: Mollusca
- Class: Gastropoda
- Order: Stylommatophora
- Family: Charopidae
- Genus: Thysanota; Albers, 1860

Synonyms
- Nanina (Thysanota) Albers, 1860; Queridomus Iredale, 1937

= Thysanota =

Genus of gastropods

Thysanota is a genus of air-breathing land snails, terrestrial pulmonate gastropod mollusks in the family Charopidae. These snails are restricted to South India and Sri Lanka.

Eight species are recognized.

== Species ==
- Thysanota conula (Blanford, 1865)
- Thysanota crinigera (Benson, 1850)
- Thysanota eumita (Sykes 1898)
- Thysanota flavida Gude, 1914
- Thysanota grenvillei (Brazier, 1876)
- Thysanota guerini (Pfeiffer, 1842)
- Thysanota hispida (Sykes 1898)
- Thysanota tabida (Pfeiffer, 1855)
