= Micromphalia =

Scientific classification
- Kingdom: Animalia
- Phylum: Mollusca
- Class: Gastropoda
- Order: Stylommatophora
- Family: Charopidae
- Subfamily: Charopinae
- Genus: Micromphalia; Ancey, 1882

Genus of gastropods

Micromphalia is a genus of gastropods belonging to the family Charopidae.

Species:

- Micromphalia abax (Marie, 1870)
- Micromphalia caledonica (Crosse, 1868)
- Micromphalia vieillardi (Crosse & Marie, 1867)
