= Mystivagor =

Scientific classification
- Kingdom: Animalia
- Phylum: Mollusca
- Class: Gastropoda
- Order: Stylommatophora
- Superfamily: Punctoidea
- Family: Charopidae
- Subfamily: Charopinae
- Genus: Mystivagor; Iredale, 1944

Genus of land snails

Mystivagor is a monotypic genus in the subfamily of the pinwheel snails.

The sole species is M. mastersi, also known as the slug-like pinwheel snail or Master's charopid land snail. It is classified as Critically Endangered under Australia’s Environment Protection and Biodiversity Conservation Act 1999.

== Description ==
The reduced, globosely ear-shaped shell of this snail is 5.4–6.7 mm in height, with a diameter of 5.6–5.7 mm. The colour is chestnut-brown with zigzag cream flammulations (flame-like markings). The sutures are impressed, with wide radial ribs. The umbilicus is absent. The aperture is teardrop-shaped.

== Distribution and habitat ==
The species is endemic to Australia's Lord Howe Island in the Tasman Sea. The snail is very rare and is known from only a few scattered localities across the island, in plant litter in rainforest and moist woodland.
