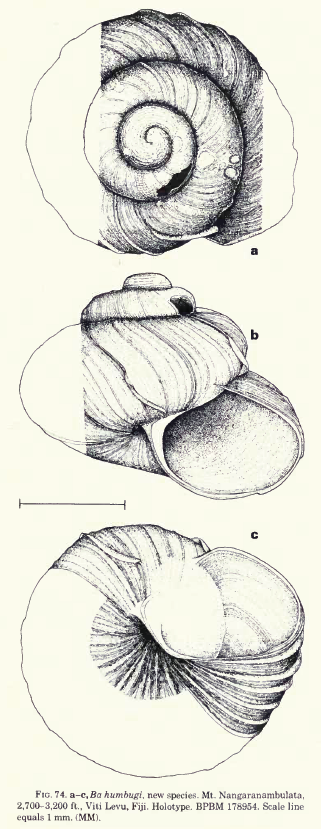
- Ba humbugi shell

Conservation status
- Endangered (IUCN 3.1)

Scientific classification
- Kingdom: Animalia
- Phylum: Mollusca
- Class: Gastropoda
- Order: Stylommatophora
- Family: Charopidae
- Subfamily: Charopinae
- Genus: Ba; Solem, 1983
- Species: B. humbugi

Binomial name
- Ba humbugi Solem, 1983

= Ba humbugi =

Species of land snail

Ba humbugi is the only species and therefore the type species in the genus Ba, a genus of land snail, belonging to the family Charopidae. Both the genus and the species were named by the American malacologist Alan Solem. The genus is endemic to the Fijian island of Viti Levu, and B. humbugi is an endangered species.

== Taxonomic history ==
Alan Solem, the curator of invertebrates at the Field Museum of Natural History, created the genus Ba for his newly-described species B. humbugi. Solem based his description of the type species B. humbugi on a holotype which the American malacologist Yoshio Kondo had collected in 1938 and three paratypes. One paratype was deposited in the Field Museum; the remaining specimens in the type series were deposited in the Bishop Museum.

=== Etymology ===
Solem chose the generic name Ba after Ba District, Fiji, which extends into B. humbugi's range. This led to him having an "irresistible impulse" to name the type species Ba humbugi, in reference to the character Ebenezer Scrooge's catchphrase "Bah! Humbug!" from Charles Dickens's novella A Christmas Carol. One review of Solem's monograph naming this species said his choice in taxa names "may either lighten the reader's day or engender hostility", giving this binomen as an example.

== Distribution ==
B. humbugi is endemic to Fiji. It is found in the interior of Viti Levu, an island in Fiji, at elevations of 950–3,200 ft (290–980 m). The holotype was collected in dense forest on Mount Nangaranambulata at an elevation of 2,700–3,200 ft (820–980 m). Two paratypes were collected on the top of Mount Korobamba at an elevation of 1,000–1,300 ft (300–400 m). The third paratype was collected in the Sanganaoreva area 5 miles (8.0 km) inland of Ngaloa, Nuku District at an elevation of 950–1,000 ft (290–300 m).

== Description ==
Ba is characterized by having a high spire and an umbilicus which is either completely closed or slightly laterally cracked. There are only 3 1/8–3 1/2 whorls, and its apical sculpture consists of about a dozen spiral cords. There are no barriers to its aperture. B. humbugi has a shell with a diameter of 2.30–3.32 millimetres (0.091–0.131 in). The height-to-diameter ratio ranges from 0.752 to 0.842. Its shell is a light reddish-yellow; its periostracal extensions are an almost black dark brown. The body is yellow-white and lacks any sort of dark markings.

== Biology ==
B. humbugi is sympatric with Sinployea irregularis; both species were found under the same log. It is probably strictly terrestrial due to a lack of black marks on its body.

== Conservation status and threats ==
According to the IUCN Red List, B. humbugi is endangered. They note that only four specimens have been found despite many surveys on Viti Levu over a century and a half. The IUCN estimates an area of occupancy of 12 square kilometres (4.6 sq mi), and its habitat continues to decline due to deforestation. The IUCN believes invasive species, such as the Pacific rat, black rat, house mouse, and various invasive ant species, also negatively affect B. humbugi. The IUCN predicts it would be detrimental if the invasive giant African snail, rosy wolf snail, or the New Guinea flatworm were introduced to Viti Levu.
