= Insularopa barrenensis =

Conservation status
- Least Concern (IUCN 3.1)

Scientific classification
- Kingdom: Animalia
- Phylum: Mollusca
- Class: Gastropoda
- Order: Stylommatophora
- Family: Charopidae
- Genus: Insularopa
- Species: I. barrenensis

Binomial name
- Insularopa barrenensis (Petterd, 1879)

Species of gastropod

Insularopa barrenensis is a species of small air-breathing land snails, terrestrial pulmonate gastropod mollusks in the family Charopidae.

This species is endemic to Australia. Its natural habitats are temperate forests and temperate shrubland.
