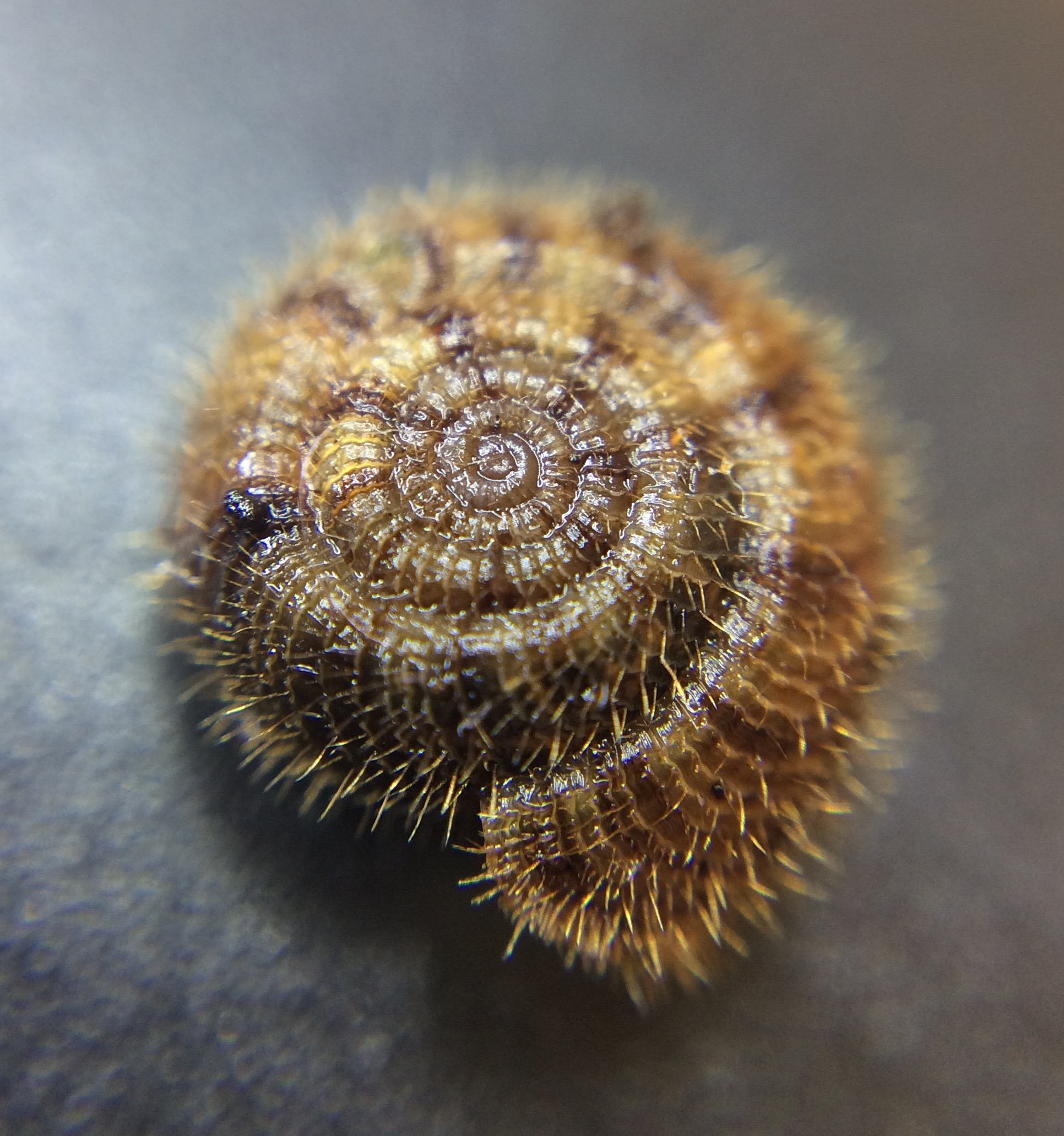
- Suteria ide

Scientific classification
- Domain: Eukaryota
- Kingdom: Animalia
- Phylum: Mollusca
- Class: Gastropoda
- Order: Stylommatophora
- Family: Charopidae
- Genus: Suteria; Pilsbry, 1892

= Suteria =

Genus of gastropods

Suteria is a genus of air-breathing land snails, terrestrial gastropod molluscs in the family Charopidae. This genus is endemic to New Zealand.

== Species ==
Species within the genus Suteria:

- Suteria ide (Gray, 1850)
- Suteria raricostata Cumber, 1962
