= Rhophodon =

Scientific classification
- Kingdom: Animalia
- Phylum: Mollusca
- Class: Gastropoda
- Order: Stylommatophora
- Family: Charopidae
- Genus: Rhophodon; Hedley, 1924

Genus of gastropods

Rhophodon is a genus of small air-breathing land snails, terrestrial pulmonate gastropod mollusks in the family Charopidae.

== Species ==
Species within the genus Rhophodon include:

- Rhophodon problematica
- Rhophodon kempseyensis
