= Dupucharopa =

Scientific classification
- Kingdom: Animalia
- Phylum: Mollusca
- Class: Gastropoda
- Order: Stylommatophora
- Family: Charopidae
- Genus: Dupucharopa; Iredale, 1937

Type species
- Helix millestriata Smith, 1874

Genus of gastropods

Dupucharopa is a genus of small, air-breathing land snails, terrestrial gastropod mollusks in the family Charopidae.

== Distribution ==
This genus occurs in Western Australia

== Species ==
Species in the genus Dupucharopa include:

- Dupucharopa millestriata (Smith, 1874)
