= Dipnelix =

Scientific classification
- Kingdom: Animalia
- Phylum: Mollusca
- Class: Gastropoda
- Order: Stylommatophora
- Family: Charopidae
- Genus: Dipnelix; Iredale, 1937

Genus of gastropods

Dipnelix is a genus of air-breathing land snail, a terrestrial gastropod mollusk in the family Charopidae.

== Species ==
The genus Dipnelix includes the following species:

- Dipnelix pertricosa
