= Kessneropa =

Conservation status
- Least Concern (IUCN 3.1)

Scientific classification
- Kingdom: Animalia
- Phylum: Mollusca
- Class: Gastropoda
- Order: Stylommatophora
- Family: Charopidae
- Genus: Kessneropa; Bonham, 2018
- Species: K. mimosa

Binomial name
- Kessneropa mimosa (Petterd, 1879)

Species of gastropod

Kessneropa is a genus of air-breathing land snails, terrestrial pulmonate gastropod molluscs in the family Charopidae. Its sole accepted species is Kessneropa mimosa. This species is endemic to Australia.
