= Hedleyoconcha =

Scientific classification
- Kingdom: Animalia
- Phylum: Mollusca
- Class: Gastropoda
- Order: Stylommatophora
- Superfamily: Punctoidea
- Family: Charopidae
- Subfamily: Charopinae
- Genus: Hedleyoconcha; Pilsbry, 1893

Type species
- Purpura pica Blainville, 1832

Genus of gastropods

Hedleyoconcha is a genus of small air-breathing land snails, terrestrial pulmonate gastropod mollusks in the subfamily Charopinae of the family Charopidae.

== Species ==
Species within the genus Hedleyoconcha include:

- Hedleyoconcha addita Iredale, 1944
- Hedleyoconcha ailaketoae Stanisic, 1990
- Hedleyoconcha delta (L. Pfeiffer, 1857)

Species brought into synonymy

- Hedleyoconcha duona Iredale, 1937: synonym of Hedleyoconcha delta (L. Pfeiffer, 1857) (junior synonym)
