= Palikirus =

Scientific classification
- Kingdom: Animalia
- Phylum: Mollusca
- Class: Gastropoda
- Order: Stylommatophora
- Family: Charopidae
- Genus: Palikirus; Solem, 1983

Genus of gastropods

Palikirus is a genus of air-breathing land snails, terrestrial pulmonate gastropod molluscs in the family Charopidae.

== Species ==
Species within the genus Palikirus include:

- Palikirus cosmetus
- Palikirus ponapicus
