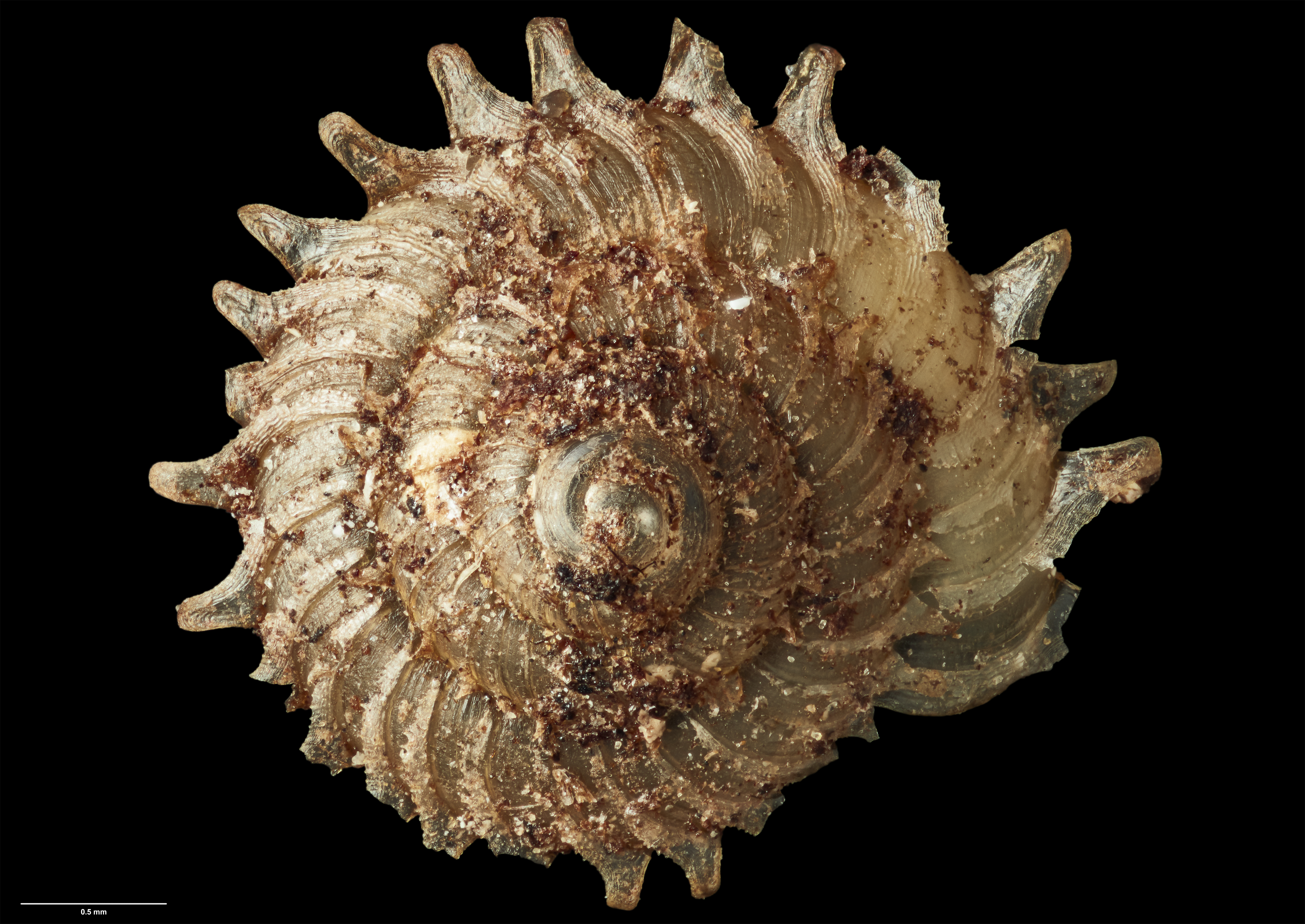
- Holotype of Therasiella serrata

Scientific classification
- Kingdom: Animalia
- Phylum: Mollusca
- Class: Gastropoda
- Order: Stylommatophora
- Superfamily: Punctoidea
- Family: Charopidae
- Subfamily: Flammoconchinae
- Genus: Therasiella; A. W. B. Powell, 1948

Type species
- Nanina celinde

= Therasiella =

Genus of gastropods

Therasiella is a genus of land snails belonging to the family Charopidae. All known members of the genus are endemic to New Zealand.

== Description ==
In the original description, Powell described the genus as below:

Inclusion of the small, depressed, acutely angulate Phrixgnathus-like celinde and tamora in Therasia is incongruous. The genus Therasia should be restricted to the larger, subglobose species centred around the genotype thaisa. Features of Therasiella, quite foreign in Therasia, are the presence of membranously plaited epidermal processes, and the small number of teeth in the radula (18 + 1 + 18), the marginals of which are bicuspid. In thaisa the formula is 26 to 28 + 1 + 28 to 26, and the marginals of this species and the associated decidua, traversi and valeria have from three to five cutting points.

The genus has a spirally lirate protoconch, and radial ribs that project into lamellae at the periphery at a sharp angle. Members of the genus have well-developed epiphallus on the penis.

== Taxonomy ==
The genus was first described by A. W. B. Powell in 1948, who named Nanina celinde (now known as Therasiella celinde) as the type species. The genus was transferred from Phenacohelicinae to Charopinae in 1973 by Frank Climo, based on anatomical differences. The holotypes of T. pectinifera, T. elevata, T. neozelanica and T. serrata are held by the Auckland War Memorial Museum.

== Distribution ==
Therasilla is endemic to New Zealand, found in the upper South Island, the North Island and on Manawatāwhi / Three Kings Islands.

== Species ==
Species within the genus Therasiella include:

- Therasiella celinde (J. E. Gray, 1850)
- Therasiella elevata Cumber, 1967
- Therasiella neozelanica Cumber, 1967
- Therasiella pectinifera (A. W. B. Powell, 1935)
- Therasiella serrata Cumber, 1967
- Therasiella tamora (F. W. Hutton, 1883)
