= Jokajdon =

Scientific classification
- Kingdom: Animalia
- Phylum: Mollusca
- Class: Gastropoda
- Order: Stylommatophora
- Family: Charopidae
- Genus: Jokajdon; Solem, 1983

Genus of gastropods

Jokajdon is a genus of small air-breathing land snails, terrestrial pulmonate gastropod mollusks in the family Charopidae.

== Species ==
Species in the genus Jokajdon include

- Jokajdon callizonus
- Jokajdon tumidulus
