= Roimontis =

Scientific classification
- Kingdom: Animalia
- Phylum: Mollusca
- Class: Gastropoda
- Order: Stylommatophora
- Family: Charopidae
- Genus: Roimontis; Solem, 1983

Genus of gastropods

Roimontis is a genus of small air-breathing land snails, terrestrial pulmonate gastropod mollusks in the family Charopidae.

== Species ==
Species within the genus Roimontis include:

- Roimontis tolotomensis
