= Geminoropa =

Scientific classification
- Kingdom: Animalia
- Phylum: Mollusca
- Class: Gastropoda
- Order: Stylommatophora
- Family: Charopidae
- Genus: Geminoropa; Iredale, 1933

Genus of gastropods

Geminoropa is a genus of small air-breathing land snails, terrestrial pulmonate gastropod mollusks in the family Charopidae.

== Species ==
Species within the genus Geminoropa include:

- Geminoropa scindocataracta
