= Hirasiella =

Hirasiella clara

Conservation status
- Data Deficient (IUCN 2.3)

Scientific classification
- Kingdom: Animalia
- Phylum: Mollusca
- Class: Gastropoda
- Order: Stylommatophora
- Family: Charopidae
- Genus: Hirasiella; Pilsbry, 1902
- Species: H. clara

Binomial name
- Hirasiella clara Pilsbry, 1902

Genus of gastropods

Hirasiella is a genus of air-breathing land snails, terrestrial pulmonate gastropod molluscs in the family Charopidae. The genus is monotypic, being represented by a single species, Hirasiella clara.
