= Coenocharopa =

Scientific classification
- Kingdom: Animalia
- Phylum: Mollusca
- Class: Gastropoda
- Order: Stylommatophora
- Family: Charopidae
- Genus: Coenocharopa; Stanisic, 1990

Genus of gastropods

Coenocharopa is a genus of very small air-breathing land snails, terrestrial pulmonate gastropod mollusks in the family Charopidae, superfamily Punctoidea.

== Species ==
Species within the genus Coenocharopa include:

- Coenocharopa aculeata
- Coenocharopa alata
- Coenocharopa elegans
- Coenocharopa macromphala
- Coenocharopa multiradiata
- Coenocharopa parvicostata
- Coenocharopa sordidus
- Coenocharopa yessabahensis
