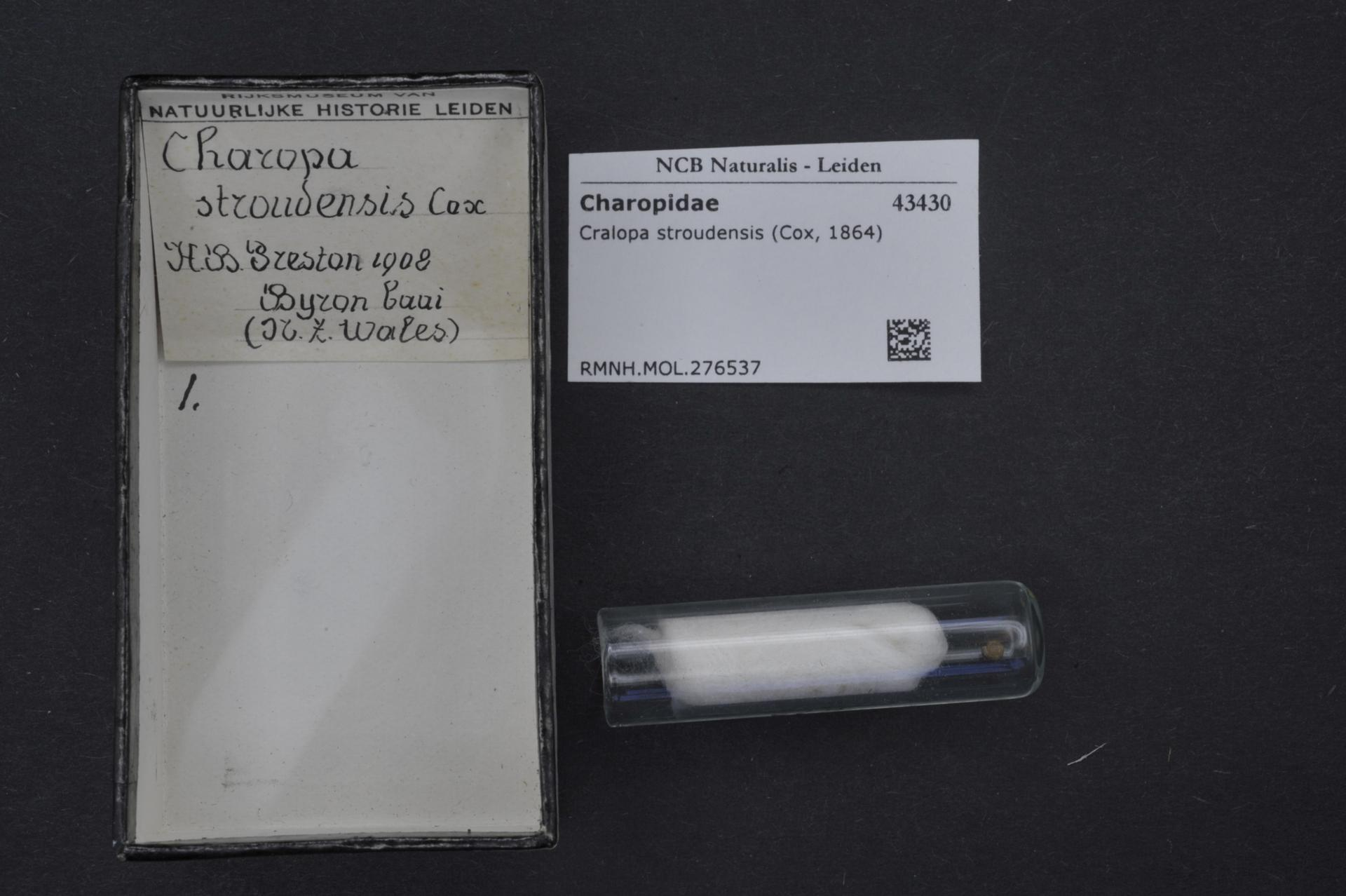
- Cralopa stroudensis – the type species

Scientific classification
- Domain: Eukaryota
- Kingdom: Animalia
- Phylum: Mollusca
- Class: Gastropoda
- Order: Stylommatophora
- Family: Charopidae
- Genus: Cralopa; Iredale, 1941

= Cralopa =

Genus of gastropods

Cralopa is a genus of land snails in the family Charopidae. They occur in Australia (eastern Queensland and New South Wales).

== Species ==
There are two recognized species:

- Cralopa kaputarensis J. Stanisic, 1990
- Cralopa stroudensis (J. C. Cox, 1864)
