= Goweroconcha =

Scientific classification
- Domain: Eukaryota
- Kingdom: Animalia
- Phylum: Mollusca
- Class: Gastropoda
- Order: Stylommatophora
- Superfamily: Punctoidea
- Family: Charopidae
- Subfamily: Charopinae
- Genus: Goweroconcha; Iredale, 1944

Genus of land snails

Goweroconcha is a genus of three species of pinwheel snails that are endemic to Australia's Lord Howe Island in the Tasman Sea.

== Species ==
- Goweroconcha waterhousiae (Hedley, 1897) – cinnamon-zigzag pinwheel snail
- Goweroconcha wenda Iredale, 1944 – pale-zigzag pinwheel snail
- Goweroconcha wilsoni Iredale, 1944 – Wilson's pinwheel snail
