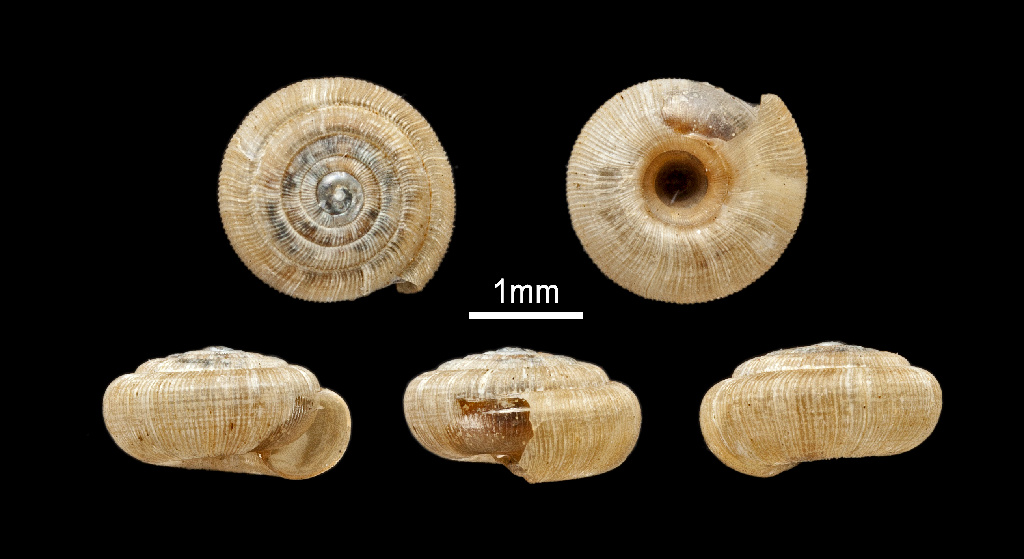
- Paratype specimens of Charopa longstaffae

Scientific classification
- Kingdom: Animalia
- Phylum: Mollusca
- Class: Gastropoda
- Order: Stylommatophora
- Family: Charopidae
- Genus: Charopa; Martens, 1860

Synonyms
- Endodonta (Charopa) Albers, 1860

= Charopa =

Genus of gastropods

Charopa is a genus of air-breathing land snails, terrestrial pulmonate gastropod mollusks in the family Charopidae.

Charopa is the type genus of the family Charopidae.

== Species ==
Species within the genus Charopa include:

- Charopa bianca (Hutton, 1883)
- Charopa coma (Gray, 1843) - type species of the genus Charopa
- Charopa lafargei Vermeulen & Marzuki, 2014
- Charopa longstaffae (Suter, 1913)
- Charopa macgillivrayana Iredale, 1913
- Charopa montivaga Suter, 1894
- Charopa pilsbryi (Suter, 1894)
- Charopa pseudocoma Suter, 1894
