= Charopella =

Scientific classification
- Kingdom: Animalia
- Phylum: Mollusca
- Class: Gastropoda
- Order: Stylommatophora
- Superfamily: Punctoidea
- Family: Charopidae
- Subfamily: Charopinae
- Genus: Charopella; Iredale, 1944

Genus of land snails

Charopella is a genus of two species of tiny pinwheel snails that are endemic to Australia's Lord Howe Island in the Tasman Sea.

== Species ==
- Charopella wilkinsoni (Brazier, 1889) – Wilkinson's pinwheel snail
- Charopella zela Iredale, 1944 – Mount Gower banded pinwheel snail
