= Roblinella =

Scientific classification
- Kingdom: Animalia
- Phylum: Mollusca
- Class: Gastropoda
- Order: Stylommatophora
- Family: Charopidae
- Genus: Roblinella; Iredale, 1937
- Species: R. roblini

Binomial name
- Roblinella roblini (Petterd, 1879)

Synonyms
- Helix roblini Petterd, 1879

Genus of gastropods

Roblinella is a monotypic genus of small land snails in the family Charopidae. The sole species is Roblinella roblini, also known as Roblin's pinwheel snail. It is endemic to Tasmania.

Other species formerly included in Roblinella have been transferred to other genera. However, Bonham (2007) pointed to existence of other, undescribed species that could be Roblinella roblini's closest relatives.

== Distribution and habitat ==
Roblinella roblini is known only from near Launceston, Tasmania. It is known from two localities about 30 km apart and is scarce at both. Surveys in the area did not reveal other populations. Specimens have been collected under/on dolerite rocks and in leaf litter in mid-slope scrub along a creek and in a gully under a fern.

== Description ==
Roblinella roblini is a small, white snail. Adults of 4.15–4.5 whorls measure 2–2.45 mm (0.079–0.096 in) in diameter, with historic records up to 2.75 mm (0.108 in). The spire is flat or slightly raised. The ratio of shell height to diameter ranges from about one-third to one-half. The protoconch has many small discrete interstical riblets that are not quite perpendicular to the primary spirals – this feature most clearly separates it from Gadoropa gadensis and most other small charopids in the region.
