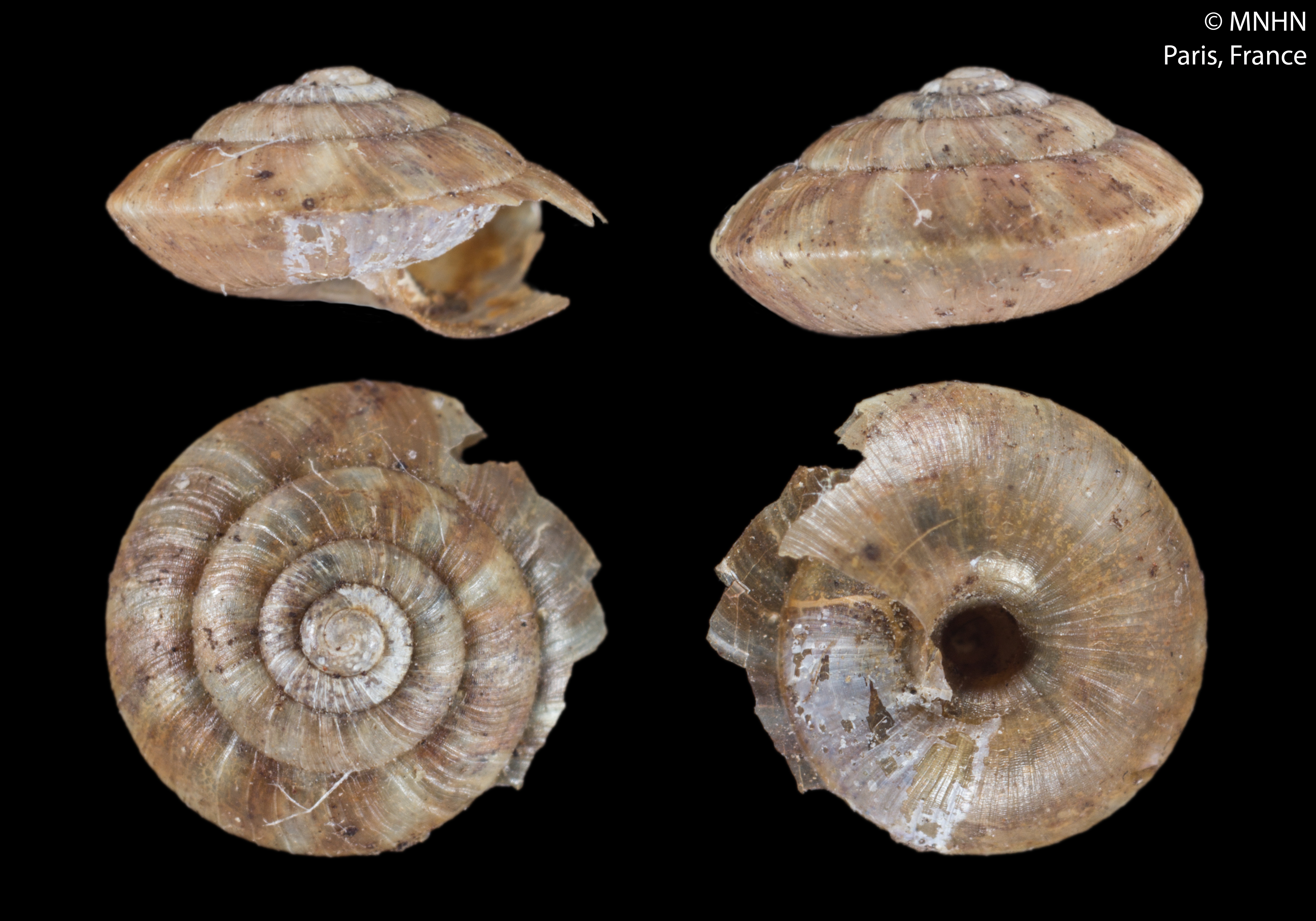
- Shell of Thalassohelix antipoda (syntype at MNHN, Paris)

Scientific classification
- Kingdom: Animalia
- Phylum: Mollusca
- Class: Gastropoda
- Order: Stylommatophora
- Infraorder: incertae sedis
- Superfamily: Punctoidea
- Family: Charopidae
- Genus: Thalassohelix; Pilsbry, 1892

Type species
- Helix zelandiae Gray, 1843

Synonyms
- Flammulina (Thalassohelix) Pilsbry, 1892; Gerontia (Thalassohelix) Pilsbry, 1892

= Thalassohelix =

Species of gastropod

Thalassohelix is a genus of air-breathing land snails, terrestrial pulmonate gastropod mollusks in the subfamily Therasiinae of the family Charopidae.

== Species ==
- Thalassohelix antipoda (Hombron & Jacquinot, 1841)
- Thalassohelix chathamensis (Suter, 1909)
- Thalassohelix igniflua (Reeve, 1852)
- Thalassohelix laingi (Suter, 1905)
- Thalassohelix obnubila (Reeve, 1852)
- Thalassohelix zelandiae (Gray, 1843)

Synonyms

- Thalassohelix minuta N. W. Gardner, 1967 accepted as Laomarex minuta (N. W. Gardner, 1967)
- Thalassohelix propinqua (F. W. Hutton, 1882) accepted as Therasia propinqua (F. W. Hutton, 1882)
- Thalassohelix prousei Powell, 1952 accepted as Phacussa prousei (Powell, 1952)
- Thalassohelix pygmaea Suter, 1913 accepted as Phrixgnathus celia F. W. Hutton, 1883
- Thalassohelix regia N. W. Gardner, 1968 accepted as Laomarex regia (N. W. Gardner, 1968)
- Thalassohelix translucens Gabriel, 1934 accepted as Mulathena fordei (Brazier, 1871) (junior synonym)
