= Exquisitiropa =

Conservation status
- Vulnerable (IUCN 2.3)

Scientific classification
- Kingdom: Animalia
- Phylum: Mollusca
- Class: Gastropoda
- Order: Stylommatophora
- Family: Charopidae
- Genus: Exquisitiropa; J. Stanisic, 2018
- Species: E. agnewi

Binomial name
- Exquisitiropa agnewi (Legrand, 1871)

Synonyms
- Helix (Discus) agnewi Legrand, 1871; Helix (Pitys) petterdi Legrand, 1871; Helix (Pitys) petterdi peroni Legrand, 1871; Roblinella agnewi (Legrand, 1871)

Species of gastropod

Exquisitiropa is a monotypic genus of small land snails in the family Charopidae. The sole species is Exquisitiropa agnewi, also known as silky snail or silky pinwheel snail. It is endemic to Tasmania.

Exquisitiropa agnewi is known only from Mount Wellington. This snail is poorly known. It has only been found at a few sites on a single mountain, a distribution that may represent a single population. It is small and hard to locate, so it is possible it may occur on other mountains nearby, but focused searches have failed to turn up specimens anywhere else.

This species lives in shrubby mountain forest habitat in the subalpine zone. It has been found in open boulder fields in patches of wet vegetation. These mountain slopes are susceptible to bushfires, one threat to what may be the single remaining population of this snail.
