= Zilchogyra =

Scientific classification
- Domain: Eukaryota
- Kingdom: Animalia
- Phylum: Mollusca
- Class: Gastropoda
- Order: Stylommatophora
- Family: Charopidae
- Genus: Zilchogyra

Genus of gastropods

Zilchogyra is a genus of air-breathing land snail, a terrestrial pulmonate gastropod mollusk in the family Helicodiscidae. Zilchogyra miocenica is the first Miocene record of the genus.

== Species ==
Species within the genus Zilchogyra include:

- Zilchogyra paulistana
