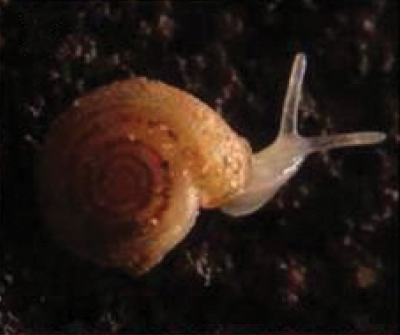
- An undescribed species of Rotadiscus from Toca do Gonçalo cave in Brazil

Scientific classification
- Kingdom: Animalia
- Phylum: Mollusca
- Class: Gastropoda
- Order: Stylommatophora
- Family: Charopidae
- Subfamily: Rotadiscinae
- Genus: Rotadiscus; Pilsbry, 1926

Synonyms
- Ptychodon (Alsolemia) Climo, 1981

= Rotadiscus (gastropod) =

Genus of gastropods

Rotadiscus is a genus of small air-breathing land snails, terrestrial pulmonate gastropod mollusks in the family Charopidae.

== Species ==
Species within the genus Radioconus include:

- Rotadiscus hermanni (L. Pfeiffer, 1866) - type species of the genus Rotadiscus
- Rotadiscus insularis (Climo, 1978)
- Rotadiscus jamiesoni (Climo, 1978)
- Rotadiscus protoinsularis Climo, 1989
- Rotadiscus smithae (Dell, 1954)
- Rotadiscus takakaensis (Climo, 1981)
- an undescribed species of Rotadiscus from Toca do Gonçalo cave in Brazil
