= Lacuropa =

Conservation status
- Vulnerable (IUCN 2.3)

Scientific classification
- Kingdom: Animalia
- Phylum: Mollusca
- Class: Gastropoda
- Order: Stylommatophora
- Family: Charopidae
- Genus: Lacuropa; Stanisic, 2018
- Species: L. colliveri

Binomial name
- Lacuropa colliveri (Gabriel, 1947)

Synonyms
- Charopa colliveri Gabriel, 1947; Cralopa colliveri (Gabriel, 1947)

Monotypic genus of gastropod

Lacuropa is a monotypic genus of land snails in the family Charopidae. Its sole accepted species is Lacuropa colliveri, which is endemic to Australia. It is known from Victoria.
