= Ruthvenia =

Scientific classification
- Kingdom: Animalia
- Phylum: Mollusca
- Class: Gastropoda
- Order: Stylommatophora
- Family: Charopidae
- Genus: Ruthvenia; Gude, 1911

Synonyms
- Austenia Gude, 1897; Sykesia Gude, 1897

Genus of gastropods

Ruthvenia is a genus of air-breathing land snails, terrestrial pulmonate gastropod mollusks in the family Charopidae. These snails are restricted to South India and Sri Lanka.

Six species are recognized.

== Description ==
Shell is trochoid to lentiform with compressed structure. Shell color varies from light-comeous to colorless. There are 1 or 2 cord-like keels on last whirl. Aperture narrow with slightly oblique shape. Umbilicus funnel-like and broad.

== Species ==
- Ruthvenia biciliata (Pfeiffer 1854)
- Ruthvenia bicincta (Bavay & Dautzenberg, 1912)
- Ruthvenia caliginosa (Sykes 1898)
- Ruthvenia clathratula (L. Pfeiffer, 1850)
- Ruthvenia clathratuloides (Gude, 1897)
- Ruthvenia retifera (L. Pfeiffer, 1845)
