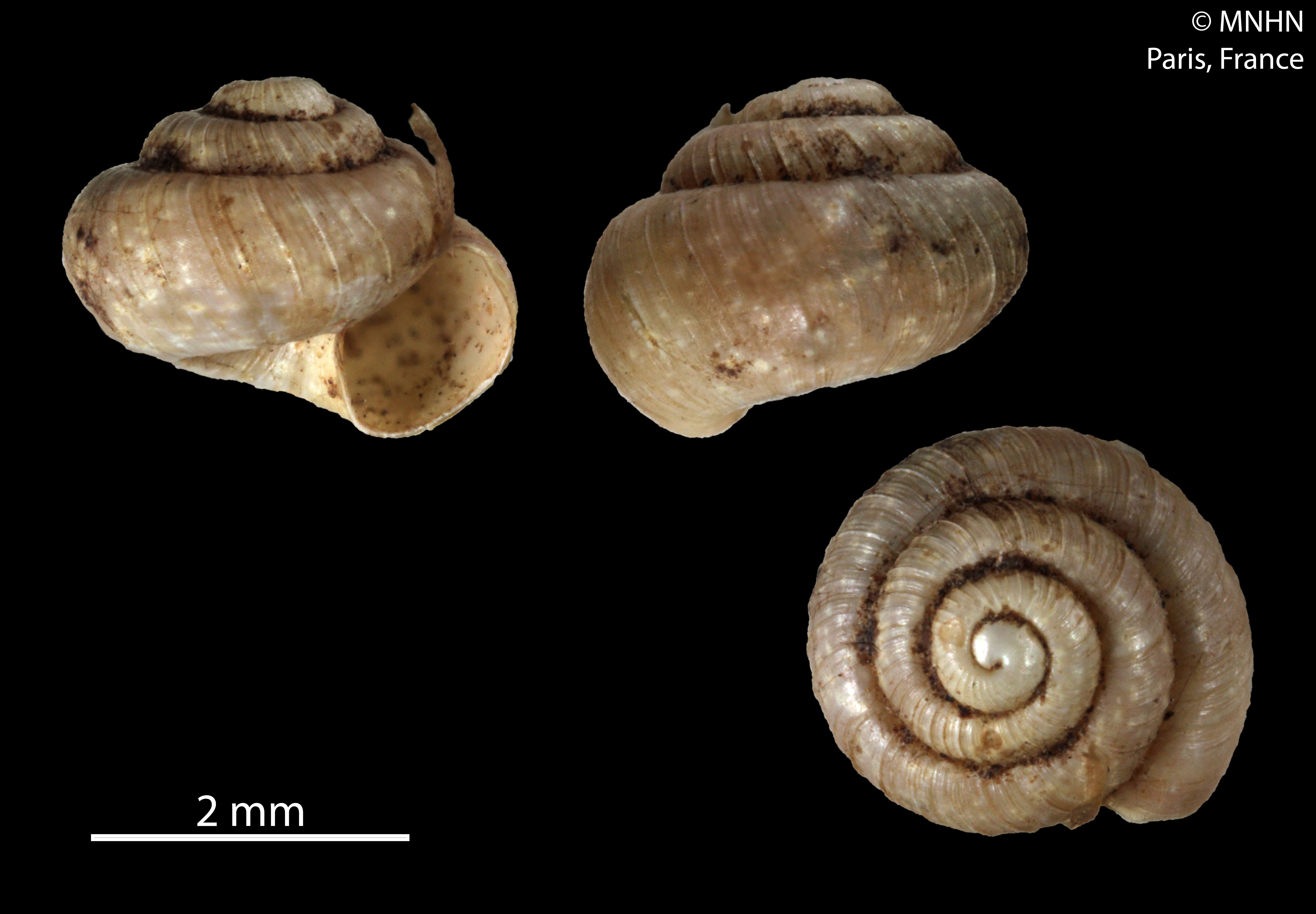
- Shell of Reticulapex compactus (paratype at MNHN, Paris)

Scientific classification
- Kingdom: Animalia
- Phylum: Mollusca
- Class: Gastropoda
- Order: Stylommatophora
- Infraorder: Rhytidoidei
- Superfamily: Rhytidoidea
- Family: Acavidae
- Genus: Reticulapex; Emberton & Pearce, 2000

Type species
- Reticulapex villosus Emberton & Pearce, 2000

= Reticulapex =

Genus of gastropods

Reticulapex is a genus of air-breathing land snails, terrestrial pulmonate gastropod mollusks in the family Acavidae.

== Species ==
Species in the genus Reticulapex include:

- Reticulapex apexfortis Emberton & Pearce, 2000
- Reticulapex choutardi (Fischer-Piette, C. P. Blanc, F. Blanc & F. Salvat, 1994)
- Reticulapex compactus Emberton & Pearce, 2000
- Reticulapex druggi (Fischer-Piette, C. P. Blanc, F. Blanc & F. Salvat, 1994)
- Reticulapex fischerpiettei Emberton & Pearce, 2000
- Reticulapex flammulatus Emberton & Pearce, 2000
- Reticulapex harananae (Emberton, 1994)
- Reticulapex intridi (Fischer-Piette, C. P. Blanc, F. Blanc & F. Salvat, 1994)
- Reticulapex lucidus Emberton & Pearce, 2000
- Reticulapex michellae K. C. Emberton, Slapcinsky, C. A. Campbell, Rakotondrazafy, Andriamiarison & J. D. Emberton, 2010
- Reticulapex scaber Emberton & Pearce, 2000
- Reticulapex stanisici Emberton & Griffiths, 2009
- Reticulapex subangulatus Emberton & Pearce, 2000
- Reticulapex talatai (Emberton, 1994)
- Reticulapex ulrichi (Fischer-Piette, C. P. Blanc, F. Blanc & F. Salvat, 1994)
- Reticulapex vatuvavyae (Emberton, 1994)
- Reticulapex villosus Emberton & Pearce, 2000
- Reticulapex vineti (Fischer-Piette, C. P. Blanc, F. Blanc & F. Salvat, 1994)
