= Gerontia (gastropod) =

Scientific classification
- Domain: Eukaryota
- Kingdom: Animalia
- Phylum: Mollusca
- Class: Gastropoda
- Order: Stylommatophora
- Family: Charopidae
- Genus: Gerontia; Hutton, 1882

Genus of gastropods

Gerontia is a genus of small air-breathing land snails, terrestrial gastropod mollusks in the family Charopidae.

== Species ==
Species within the genus Gerontia include:

- Gerontia pantherina, Hutton, 1882
