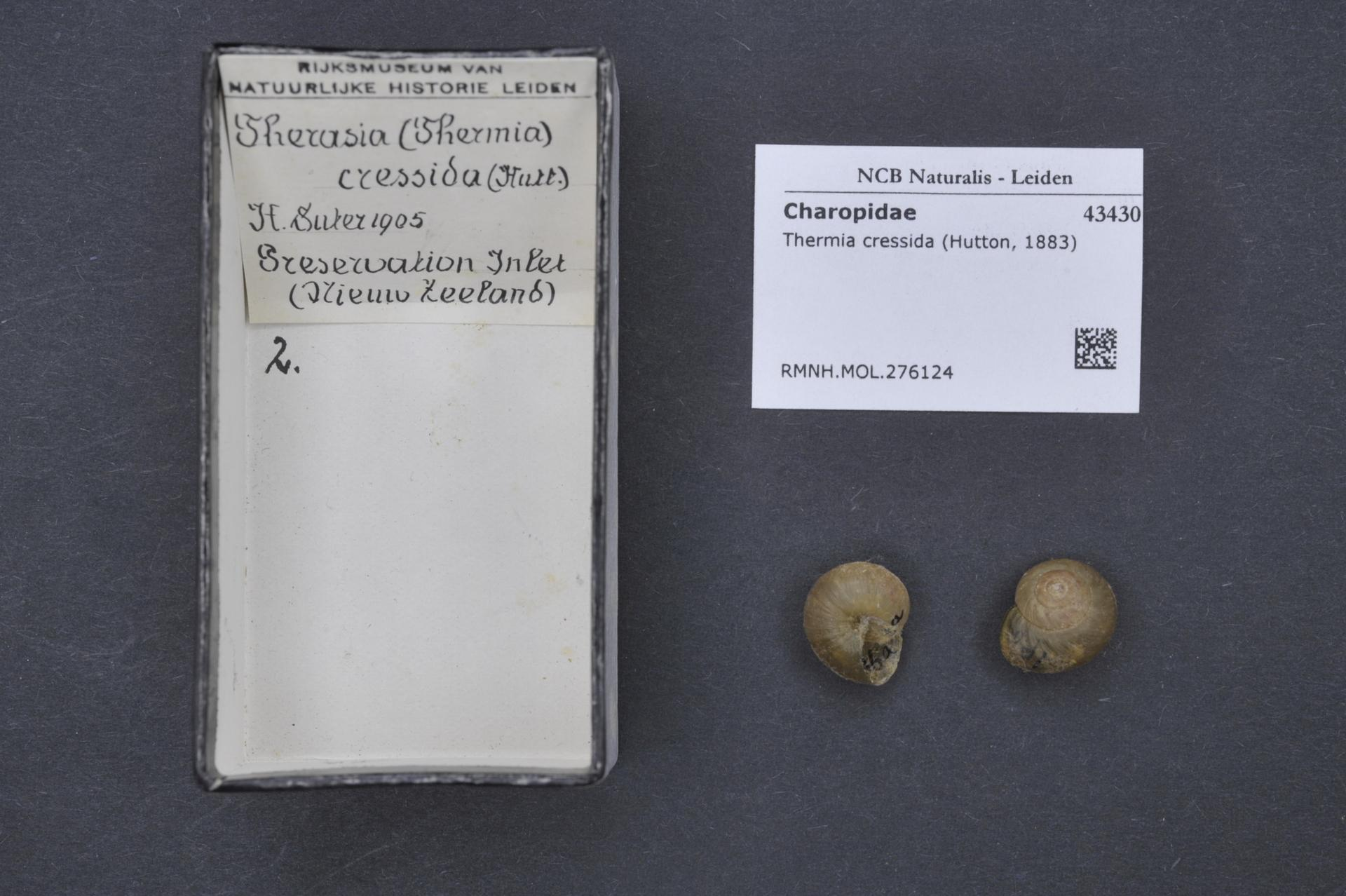
- Thermia cressida shells

Scientific classification
- Domain: Eukaryota
- Kingdom: Animalia
- Phylum: Mollusca
- Class: Gastropoda
- Order: Stylommatophora
- Family: Charopidae
- Genus: Thermia; Hutton, 1904

Synonyms
- Flammulina (Pyrrha) Hutton, 1883; Pyrrha Hutton, 1883 (invalid: junior homonym of Pyrrha] Cabanis, 1849; Thermia is a replacement name)

= Thermia (gastropod) =

Genus of gastropods

Thermia is a genus of air-breathing land snails, terrestrial pulmonate gastropod mollusks in the family Charopidae.

== Species ==
Species in the genus Thermia include:

- Thermia cressida (Hutton, 1883)
- Thermia subincarnata (Suter, 1894)
- Thermia virescens (Suter, 1899)
