= Alpiniropa =

Conservation status
- Near Threatened (IUCN 3.1)

Scientific classification
- Kingdom: Animalia
- Phylum: Mollusca
- Class: Gastropoda
- Order: Stylommatophora
- Family: Charopidae
- Genus: Alpiniropa; Stanisic, 2018
- Species: A. okeana

Binomial name
- Alpiniropa okeana (Gabriel, 1947)

Synonyms
- Allocharopa okeana (Gabriel, 1947)

Genus of gastropods

Alpiniropa is a genus of very small air-breathing land snails, terrestrial pulmonate gastropod mollusks in the family Charopidae. Alpiniropa is a monotypic genus, meaning it contains only one species. Its sole species, Alpiniropa okeana, is endemic to Australia.
