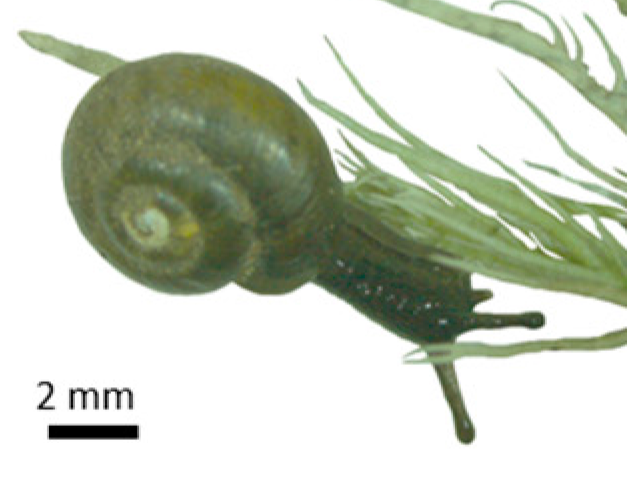
- A live Notodiscus hookeri
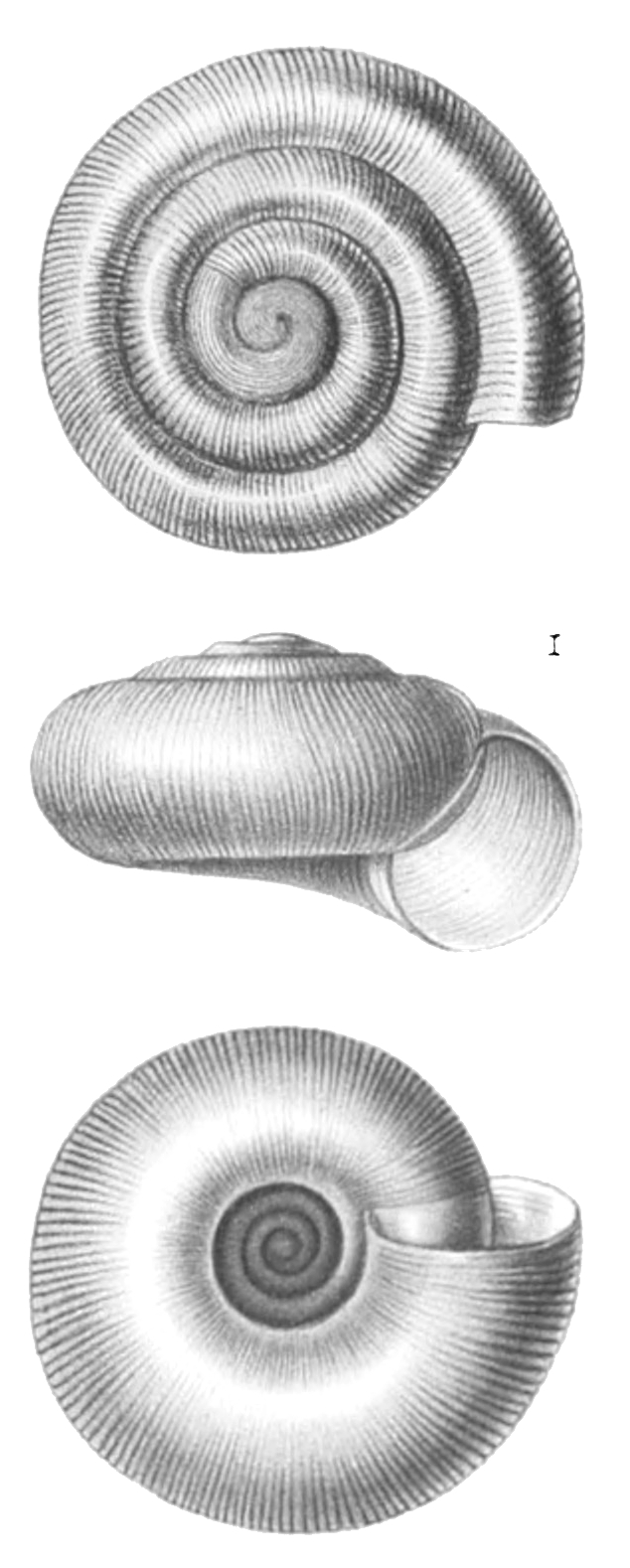
- Three views of a shell of Radiodiscus patagonicus

Scientific classification
- Kingdom: Animalia
- Phylum: Mollusca
- Class: Gastropoda
- Order: Stylommatophora
- Suborder: Helicina
- Infraorder: incertae sedis
- Superfamily: Punctoidea
- Family: Charopidae; Hutton, 1884

Synonyms
- Dipnelicidae Iredale, 1937; Flammulinidae Crosse, 1895; Hedleyoconchidae Iredale, 1942; Pseudocharopidae Iredale, 1944; Trachycystidae Schileyko, 1986

= Charopidae =

Family of gastropods

Charopidae, also known as Pinwheel snails, is a taxonomic family of small air-breathing land snails (and semi-slugs such as Otoconcha dimidiata), terrestrial pulmonate gastropod mollusks in the superfamily Punctoidea.

== Taxonomy ==
The following genera are recognised in the family Charopidae:

=== Subfamily Charopinae ===
- Acanthoptyx Ancey, 1888
- Acheronopa Hyman & Stanisic, 2005
- Aeschrodomus Pilsbry, 1892
- Albiropa Holcroft & Stanisic, 2018
- Allocharopa Iredale, 1937
- Amfractaropa Holcroft, 2018
- Andrefrancia Solem, 1960
- Annoselix Iredale, 1939
- Ba Solem, 1983 - with the only species Ba humbugi
- Barringtonica Shea, Colgan & Stanisic, 2012
- Biomphalopa Stanisic, 1990
- Bischoffena Iredale, 1937
- Burwellia Holcroft & Stanisic, 2018
- Cancellocochlea Shea, Colgan & Stanisic, 2012
- Cavellia Iredale, 1915
- Cavellioropa Dell, 1952
- Charopa E. von Martens, 1860 - type genus of the family Charopidae
- Charopella Iredale, 1944
- Chaureopa Climo, 1985
- Coenocharopa Stanisic, 1990
- Comboynea Shea, Colgan & Stanisic, 2012
- Comularopa Holcroft, 2018
- Coricudgia Hyman & Stanisic, 2005
- Corinomala Iredale, 1939
- Cralopa Iredale, 1941
- Cryptocharopa Preston, 1913
- Cumberlandica Shea, Colgan & Stanisic, 2012
- Danielleilona Stanisic, 1993
- Decoriropa Hyman & Stanisic, 2005
- Dentherona Iredale, 1933
- Dictyoropa Shea, Colgan & Stanisic, 2012
- Diphyoropa Hyman & Stanisic, 2005
- Dipnelix Iredale, 1937
- Discocharopa Iredale, 1913
- Dividospiralia Stanisic, 2010
- Dupucharopa Iredale, 1937
- Egestula Iredale, 1915
- Egilodonta Iredale, 1937
- Egilomen Iredale, 1937
- Elsothera Iredale, 1933
- Epinicium Iredale, 1939
- Eungellaropa Holcroft & Stanisic, 2018
- Excaliburopa Stanisic, 2010
- Fectola Iredale, 1915
- Frustropa Iredale, 1945
- Geminoropa Kershaw, 1955
- Gerontia Hutton, 1882
- Gouldiropa Hyman & Stanisic, 2005
- Goweroconcha Iredale, 1944
- Graeffedon Solem, 1983
- Groveiana Stanisic, 2018
- Gyrocochlea Hedley, 1924
- Gyropena Iredale, 1944
- Hedleyoconcha Pilsbry, 1893
- Hedleyropa Hyman & Stanisic, 2005
- Hirsutaropa Holcroft & Stanisic, 2018
- Huntiana Stanisic, 2018
- Hyaloropa Stanisic, 2018
- Insularopa Stanisic, 2018
- Insullaoma Iredale, 1937
- Isolderopa Stanisic, 2010
- Kannaropa Iredale, 1937
- Kermodon Iredale, 1945
- Koreelahropa Stanisic, 2010
- Kosciuszkoropa Stanisic, 2018
- Lacuropa Stanisic, 2018
- Lagivala Solem, 1983
- Lauopa Solem, 1983
- Lenwebbia Stanisic, 1990
- Letomola Iredale, 1941
- Leurocochlea Stanisic, 2010
- Luinodiscus Iredale, 1937
- Luturopa Stanisic, 2010
- Maafu Solem, 1983
- Macleayropa Stanisic, 2010
- Macphersonea Shea, Colgan & Stanisic, 2012
- Macrophallikoropa Hyman & Stanisic, 2005
- Marilyniropa Hyman & Stanisic, 2005
- Meredithena Stanisic, 2018
- Metaropa Stanisic, 2018
- Micromphalia Ancey, 1882
- Minutiropa Stanisic, 2018
- Mocella Iredale, 1915
- Monomphalus Ancey, 1882
- Mulathena B. J. Smith & Kershaw, 1985
- Mussonula Iredale, 1937
- Mystivagor Iredale, 1944
- Nanoropa Stanisic, 2018
- Nautiliropa Stanisic, 1990
- Neoparyphantopsis Miquel & Araya, 2015
- Ngairea Stanisic, 1990
- Nodularopa Holcroft, 2018
- Norfolcioconcha Preston, 1913
- Notodiscus Thiele, 1931
- Nullarboropa Stanisic, 2018
- Omphaloropa Stanisic, 1990
- Oreokera Stanisic, 1987
- Oreomava Kershaw, 1956
- Papulaoma Iredale, 1941
- Paracharopa Climo, 1983
- Pararhytida Ancey, 1882
- Paratrochus Pilsbry, 1893
- Parvicharopa Solem, 1958
- Paryphantopsis Thiele, 1928
- Penescosta Iredale, 1944
- Pereduropa Stanisic, 2010
- Pernagera Iredale, 1939
- Phenacharopa Pilsbry, 1893
- Pillomena Iredale, 1937
- Planilaoma Iredale, 1937
- Planorbacochlea Shea, Colgan & Stanisic, 2012
- Platyrhytida Cockerell, 1895
- Plesiopsis Ancey, 1888
- Protractiropa Stanisic, 2018
- Pseudegestula Dell, 1954
- Pseudocharopa Peile, 1929
- Pulcharopa Iredale, 1944
- Pulchridomus Climo, 1980
- Radiolaropa Holcroft, 2018
- Reticharopa Solem, 1959
- Rhophodon Hedley, 1924
- Rhytidopsis Ancey, 1882
- Richardsoniana Stanisic, 2010
- Richmondaropa Shea, Colgan & Stanisic, 2012
- Robinsoniana Stanisic, 2018
- Roblinella Iredale, 1937
- Scelidoropa Hyman & Stanisic, 2005
- Setomedea Iredale, 1941
- Setoturbinata Stanisic, 2010
- Sharniropa Hyman & Stanisic, 2005
- Shearopa Stanisic, 2010
- Sinployea Solem, 1983
- Spiraliropa Stanisic, 2010
- Stanisicaropa Holcroft, 2018
- Stenacapha B. J. Smith & Kershaw, 1985
- Suteria Pilsbry, 1892
- Tasmanoropa Bonham, 2018
- Tasmathera Bonham, 2018
- Tateropa Stanisic, 2018
- Teracharopa Maassen, 2000
- Thryasona B. J. Smith & Kershaw, 1985
- Tristanoropa Holcroft, 2018
- Tropidotropis Ancey, 1888
- Tuimalila Solem, 1983
- Vatusila Solem, 1983
- Whissonia Stanisic, 2018
- Whitcochlea Holcroft, 2018
- Whiteheadia Hyman & Stanisic, 2005
- Xenoropa Holcroft, 2018
- Ygernaropa Stanisic, 2010

=== Subfamily Flammoconchinae ===
- Calymna Hutton, 1883
- Flammoconcha Dell, 1952 - type genus of the subfamily Flammoconchinae
- Therasiella Powell, 1948

=== Subfamily Flammulininae ===
- Amphidoxa Albers, 1850
- Flammulina E. von Martens, 1873
- Flammulops Iredale, 1937
- Montaropa Climo, 1984
- Protoflammulina Climo, 1971

=== Subfamily Otoconchinae ===
- Maoriconcha Dell, 1952
- Otoconcha Hutton, 1884 - type genus of the subfamily Otoconchinae

=== Subfamily Phenacohelicinae ===
- Allodiscus Pilsbry, 1892
- Canallodiscus B. A. Marshall & Barker, 2008
- Costallodiscus B. A. Marshall & Barker, 2008
- Granallodiscus B. A. Marshall & Barker, 2008
- Hirsutodiscus Climo, 1971
- Neophenacohelix Cumber, 1961
- Phenacohelix Suter, 1892
- Pseudallodiscus Climo, 1971

=== Subfamily Ranfurlyinae ===
- Ranfurlya Suter, 1903 - type genus of the subfamily Ranfurlyinae

=== Subfamily Rotadiscinae ===
- Alsolemia Climo, 1981
- Damonita Climo, 1981
- Helenoconcha Pilsbry, 1892
- Huonodon Iredale, 1945
- Loisthodon Climo, 1989
- Microcharopa Solem, 1983
- Missioclivus Iredale, 1941
- Mitodon Climo, 1989
- Ptychodon Ancey, 1888
- Radioconus H. B. Baker, 1927
- Radiodiscus Pilsbry, 1906
- Radiodomus H. B. Baker, 1930
- Rotacharopa Stanisic, 1990

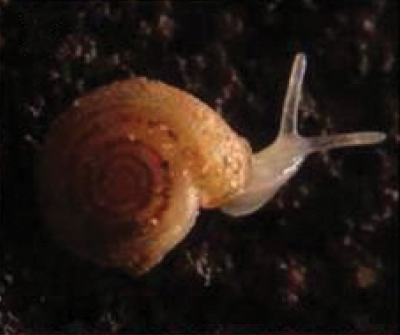
An undesribed species of Rotadiscus from Toca do Gonçalo cave in Brazil

- Rotadiscus Pilsbry, 1926 - type genus of the subfamily Rotadiscinae
- Zelandiscus Climo, 1989

=== Subfamily Semperdoninae ===
- Himeroconcha Solem, 1983
- Landronellum Solem, 1983
- Semperdon Solem, 1983 - type genus of the subfamily Semperdoninae

=== Subfamily Therasiinae ===
- Phacussa Hutton, 1883
- Serpho Hutton, 1904
- Thalassohelix Pilsbry, 1892
- Therasia Hutton, 1883
- Thermia Hutton, 1904

=== Subfamily Thysanotinae ===
- Fametesta Pilsbry, 1902
- Glyptaulax Gude, 1914
- Hirasea Pilsbry, 1902
- Hirasiella Pilsbry, 1902
- Philalanka Godwin-Austen, 1898
- Ruthvenia Gude, 1911
- Tadaia Minato & Okubo, 1992
- Thysanota E. von Martens, 1860 - type genus of the subfamily Thysanotinae

=== Subfamily Trachycystinae ===
- Araucocharopa Miquel & Cádiz Lorca, 2008
- Austrodiscus Parodiz, 1957
- Chalcocystis H. Watson, 1934
- Chellius Vargas-Almonacid & Stuardo, 2007
- Chilocystis H. Watson, 1934
- Cyclocystis H. Watson, 1934
- Dendrotrichia van Bruggen & Verdcourt, 1965
- Glabrogyra Müller da Fonseca & Thomé, 1993
- Helenodiscus Solem, 1977
- Lilloiconcha Weyrauch, 1965
- Liparocystis H. Watson, 1934
- Lyrocystis H. Watson, 1934
- Payenia J. Mabille & Rochebrune, 1889
- Phaulocystis H. Watson, 1934
- Phortion Preston, 1910
- Pilula E. von Martens, 1898
- Propilula Germain, 1918
- Prositala Germain, 1915
- Pseudohelenoconcha Zilch, 1959
- Psichion Gude, 1911
- Reticulapex Emberton & Pearce, 2000
- Stephacharopa Miquel & Araya, 2013
- Stephadiscus Hylton Scott, 1981
- Stephanoda E. von Martens, 1860
- Trachycystis Pilsbry, 1893 - type genus of the subfamily Trachycystinae
- Xerocystis H. Watson, 1934
- Zilchogyra Weyrauch, 1965

=== Subfamily Trukcharopinae ===
- Jokajdon Solem, 1983
- Kubaryiellus Solem, 1983
- Palikirus Solem, 1983
- Palline Solem, 1983
- Roimontis Solem, 1983
- Russatus Solem, 1983
- Trukcharopa Solem, 1983 - type genus of the subfamily Trukcharopinae

=== Incerta sedis ===
- Afrodonta Melvill & Ponsonby, 1908
- Alpiniropa Stanisic, 2018
- Ammoniropa Bonham, 2018
- Archiropa Bonham, 2018
- Austellorien Stanisic, 2018
- Banjoropa Stanisic, 2018
- Biomphalodonta Herbert, 2018
- Bonhamaropa Stanisic, 2018
- Chordaropa Stanisic, 2016
- Climocella Goulstone, 1996
- †Colhueconus Miquel & Bellosi, 2010
- Costulodonta Herbert, 2020
- Dendropa Marshall & Worthy, 2017
- Diemenoropa Bonham, 2018
- Exquisitiropa Stanisic, 2018
- Gadoropa Bonham, 2018
- Iterodonta Herbert, 2020
- Kessneropa Bonham, 2018
- Lithocouperia Stanisic, 2016
- Lorelleia Stanisic, 2018
- Lottaropa Bonham, 2018
- † Patagocharopa Miquel & P. E. Rodriguez, 2016
- Phialodonta Herbert, 2020
- Reticularopa Stanisic, 2016
