= List of vulnerable invertebrates =

- Extinct in the wild (EW): 2 species
- Critically endangered (CR): 853 species
- Endangered (EN): 1,533 species
- Vulnerable (VU): 1,578 species
- Near threatened (NT, LR/cd): 1,119 species
- Least concern (LC): 8,632 species
- Data deficient (DD): 4,644 species
Invertebrate species (IUCN, 2025.2)
- 18,442 extant species have been evaluated
- 13,798 of those are fully assessed (Note: excludes data deficient evaluations.)
- 9,751 are not threatened at present
- 4,047 to 8,691 are threatened (Note: Threatened comprises CR, EN and VU. Upper estimate additionally includes DD.)
- 83 to 255 are extinct or extinct in the wild:
  - 81 extinct (EX) species (Note: Chart omits extinct (EX) species)
  - 2 extinct in the wild (EW)
  - 171 possibly extinct [CR(PE)]
  - 1 possibly extinct in the wild [CR(PEW)]

Vulnerable (VU) species are considered to be facing a high risk of extinction in the wild.

In July 2016, the International Union for Conservation of Nature (IUCN) listed 2178 vulnerable invertebrate species. Of all evaluated invertebrate species, 12% are listed as vulnerable. The IUCN also lists 47 invertebrate subspecies as vulnerable.

No subpopulations of invertebrates have been evaluated by the IUCN.

For a species to be assessed as vulnerable to extinction the best available evidence must meet quantitative criteria set by the IUCN designed to reflect "a high risk of extinction in the wild". Endangered and critically endangered species also meet the quantitative criteria of vulnerable species, and are listed separately. See: List of endangered invertebrates, List of critically endangered invertebrates. Vulnerable, endangered and critically endangered species are collectively referred to as threatened species by the IUCN.

Additionally 5278 invertebrate species (29% of those evaluated) are listed as data deficient, meaning there is insufficient information for a full assessment of conservation status. As these species typically have small distributions and/or populations, they are intrinsically likely to be threatened, according to the IUCN. While the category of data deficient indicates that no assessment of extinction risk has been made for the taxa, the IUCN notes that it may be appropriate to give them "the same degree of attention as threatened taxa, at least until their status can be assessed".

This is a complete list of vulnerable invertebrate species and subspecies as evaluated by the IUCN.

== Nemertea ==
- Nightingale ribbon worm (Katechonemertes nightingaleensis)

== Annelids ==
- Giant Palouse earthworm (Driloleirus americanus)

== Onychophora ==
- Indigo velvet worm (Peripatoides indigo)
- Peripatoides suteri
- White cave velvet worm (Peripatopsis alba)
- Knysna velvet worm (Peripatopsis clavigera)

== Molluscs ==
There are 879 mollusc species and 18 mollusc subspecies assessed as vulnerable.

=== Gastropods ===
There are 828 gastropod species and 16 gastropod subspecies assessed as vulnerable.

==== Stylommatophora ====
Stylommatophora includes the majority of land snails and slugs. There are 339 species and six subspecies in the order Stylommatophora assessed as vulnerable.

===== Charopids =====
- Allocharopa erskinensis
- Cralopa colliveri
- Dupucharopa millestriata
- Geminoropa scindocataracta
- Hedleyoconcha ailaketoae
- Lagivala minusculus
- Lagivala vivus
- Microcharopa mimula
- Norfolcioconch iota
- Norfolcioconch norfolkensis
- Oreomava otwayensis
- Penescosta mathewsi
- Penescosta sororcula
- Pernagera gatliffi
- Pilsbrycharopa tumida
- Pilula praetumida
- Radiodiscus compactus
- Rhysoconcha atanuiensis
- Roblinella agnewi
- Ruatara oparica
- Sinployea adposita
- Sinployea godeffroyana
- Sinployea inermis
- Sinployea lauenis
- Sinployea monstrosa
- Sinployea pitcairnensis
- Sinployea recursa

===== Helicarionids =====
- Buffetia retinaculum
- Diastole tenuistriata
- Harmogenanina argentea
- Helicarion leopardina
- Helicarion porrectus
- Burgundy snail (Helicarion rubicundus)
- Iredaleoconcha caporaphe
- Kaliella hongkongensis
- Philonesia filiceti
- Philonesia pitcairnensis
- Pittoconcha concinna
- Theskelomensor creon
- Tubuaia fosbergi

===== Orthalicids =====
- Bothriembryon bradshaweri
- Bothriembryon brazieri
- Bothriembryon glauerti
- Bothriembryon irvineanus
- Bothriembryon spenceri
- Bothriembryon whitleyi
- Bulimulus akamatus
- Bulimulus alethorhytidus
- Bulimulus amastroides
- Bulimulus blombergi
- Bulimulus calvus
- Bulimulus cavagnaroi
- Bulimulus darwini
- Bulimulus hoodensis
- Bulimulus jervisensis
- Bulimulus nesioticus
- Bulimulus perrus
- Bulimulus rabidensis
- Bulimulus tortuganus
- Bulimulus unifasciatus
- Bulimulus ustulatus
- Drymaeus acervatus
- Drymaeus henseli
- Placostylus ambagiosus
- New Zealand flax snail (Placostylus bollonsi)
- Placostylus eddystonensis
- Placostylus elobatus
- Placostylus fibratus
- Pupuharakeke or flax snail (Placostylus hongii)
- Placostylus malleatus
- Placostylus porphyrostomus

===== Euconulids =====
- Caldwellia imperfecta
- Ctenophila vorticella
- Dupontia levis
- Dupontia nitella
- Dupontia poweri
- Liardetia boninensis
- Plegma caelatura

===== Streptaxids =====
- Acanthennea erinacea
- Augustula braueri
- Gonidomus sulcatus
- Gonospira cylindrella
- Gonospira holostoma
- Gonospira madgei
- Gonospira striaticostus
- Gonospira teres
- Gonospira turgidula
- Gulella amboniensis
- Microstrophia nana
- Priodiscus costatus
- Priodiscus serratus
- Silhouettia silhouettae

===== Ferussaciids =====
- Amphorella cimensis
- Amphorella hypselia
- Amphorella iridescens
- Amphorella melampoides
- Cecilioides connollyi
- Cylichnidia ovuliformis

===== Helminthoglyptids =====
- White desert snail (Eremarionta immaculata)
- Thousand Palms desert snail (Eremarionta millepalmarum)
- Allyn Smith's banded snail (Helminthoglypta allynsmithi)
- Mesa shoulderband (Helminthoglypta coelata)
- Concentrated snail (Micrarionta facta)
- Gabb's snail (Micrarionta gabbii)
- Prickly Pear Island snail (Micrarionta opuntia)
- Keeled sideband (Monadenia circumcarinata)
- Trinity bristle snail (Monadenia setosa)
- Plain cactus snail (Xerarionta intercisa)
- Wreathed cactus snail (Xerarionta redimita)
- Bicolor cactus snail (Xerarionta tryoni)

===== Oxychilids =====
- Mediterranea amaltheae
- Oxychilus agostinhoi
- Oxychilus lineolatus
- Oxychilus oglasicola
- Retinella stabilei

===== Camaenids =====
- Carinotrachia carsoniana
- Cristilabrum isolatum
- Cristilabrum monodon
- Cristilabrum primum
- Cristilabrum rectum
- Cristilabrum simplex
- Cupedora nottensis
- Divellomelon hillieri
- Glyptorhagada bordaensis
- Glyptorhagada euglypta
- Glyptorhagada kooringensis
- Glyptorhagada tattawuppana
- Kimboraga koolanensis
- Kimboraga micromphala
- Kimboraga yammerana
- Mouldingia occidentalis
- Ningbingia australis
- Ningbingia bulla
- Ningbingia dentiens
- Ningbingia laurina
- Ningbingia octava
- Ningbingia res
- Mount dryander scaly snail (Offachloritis dryanderensis)
- Ordtrachia elegans
- Bennett's woodland snail (Pallidelix bennetti)
- Pleuroxia hinsbyi
- Jenolan Caves woodland snail (Pommerhelix depressa)
- Prototrachia sedula
- Rhagada gibbensis
- Rhagada harti
- Semotrachia euzyga
- Setobaudinia spina
- Sinumelon bednalli
- Tolgachloritis campbelli
- Torresitrachia thedana
- Turgenitubulus aslini
- Turgenitubulus costus
- Turgenitubulus depressus
- Turgenitubulus foramenus
- Turgenitubulus opiranus
- Turgenitubulus pagodula
- Turgenitubulus tanmurrana
- Vidumelon wattii
- Westraltrachia alterna
- Westraltrachia inopinata
- Westraltrachia lievreana
- Westraltrachia porcata
- Westraltrachia recta
- Westraltrachia subtila
- Westraltrachia turbinata
- Youwanjela wilsoni

===== Lauriids =====
- Leiostyla arborea
- Leiostyla colvillei
- Leiostyla corneocostata
- Leiostyla ferraria
- Leiostyla filicum
- Leiostyla heterodon
- Leiostyla laurinea
- Leiostyla macilenta

===== Vertiginids =====
Species

- Acinolaemus carcharodon
- Anauchen informis
- Gastrocopta boninensis
- Hypselostoma megaphonum
- Hypselostoma perigyra
- Truncatellina lussinensis
- Desmoulin's whorl snail (Vertigo moulinsiana)
- Vertigo parcedentata

Subspecies

- Anauchen informis informis
- Anauchen informis parcedentata

===== Trissexodontids =====
- Hatumia cobosi
- Oestophora granesae
- Oestophora mariae
- Suboestophora altamirai
- Suboestophora hispanica
- Suboestophora jeresae

===== Helicids =====
Species

- Arianta xatartii
- Chilostoma adelozona
- Codringtonia elisabethae
- Codringtonia eucineta
- Codringtonia gittenbergeri
- Codringtonia helenae
- Codringtonia intusplicata
- Codringtonia neocrassa
- Codringtonia parnassia
- Hemicycla eurythyra
- Hemicycla inutilis
- Hemicycla pouchet
- Iberus campesinus
- Iberus ortizi
- Macularia saintivesi
- Tacheocampylaea carotii
- Tacheocampylaea raspailii
- Theba impugnata
- Tyrrheniberus ridens
- Tyrrheniberus villicus
- Vidovicia coerulans

Subspecies

- Hemicycla glyceia silensis

===== Hygromiids =====
Species

- Actinella actinophora
- Actinella armitageana
- Actinella giramica
- Actinella laciniosa
- Actinella littorinella
- Canariella bimbachensis
- Canariella fortunata
- Canariella hispidula
- Canariella leprosa
- Canariella pontelirae
- Canariella pthonera
- Candidula fiorii
- Candidula spadae
- Caseolus baixoensis
- Caseolus calculus
- Caseolus leptostictus
- Cernuellopsis ghisottii
- Ciliellopsis oglasae
- Cryptosaccus asturiensis
- Disculella spirulina
- Ganula gadirana
- Helicella valdeona
- Hygromia golasi
- Hygromia odeca
- Hygromia tassyi
- Hystricella leacockiana
- Cima discula (Hystricella turricula)
- Ichnusomunda usticensis
- Leptaxis furva
- Monacha rizzae
- Monacha ruffoi
- Monachoides fallax
- Moreletina obruta
- Nienhuisiella antonellae
- Polloneria contermina
- Pyrenaearia cotiellae
- Pyrenaearia daanidentata
- Pyrenaearia navasi
- Pyrenaearia parva
- Pyrenaearia velascoi
- Schileykiella bodoni
- Spirorbula squalida
- Xerocrassa cardonae
- Xerocrassa gharlapsi
- Xerocrassa roblesi
- Xerocrassa zaharensis
- Xerotricha bierzona

Subspecies

- Leptaxis simia portosancti

===== Vitrinids =====
- Oligolimax musignani
- Phenacolimax blanci
- Plutonia albopalliata
- Plutonia dianae
- Sardovitrina polloneriana

===== Chondrinids =====
- Abida ateni
- Chondrina centralis
- Chondrina gasulli
- Chondrina gerhardi
- Chondrina maginensis
- Chondrina oligodonta
- Rupestrella homala
- Rupestrella jaeckeli
- Rupestrella occulta
- Solatopupa cianensis
- Solatopupa psarolena

===== Enids =====
- Mastus amenazada
- Mastus claudia
- Napaeus boucheti
- Napaeus elegans
- Napaeus esbeltus
- Napaeus lichenicola
- Napaeus ornamentatus
- Napaeus roccellicola
- Napaeus rupicola
- Napaeus tagamichensis
- Napaeus taguluchensis

===== Other Stylommatophora =====
Species

- Agardhiella tunde
- Tight coin (Ammonitella yatesii)
- Ampelita soulaiana
- Archachatina bicarinata
- Argna bourguignatiana
- Argna valsabina
- Boettgeria obesiuscula
- Bofilliella subarcuata
- Boninosuccinea ogasawarae
- Boninosuccinea punctulispira
- Burnup's hunter slug (Chlamydephorus burnupi)
- Snake skin hunter slug (Chlamydephorus dimidius)
- Christianoconcha quintalia
- Clavator moreleti
- Cryptazeca elongata
- Cryptazeca monodonta
- Cryptazeca spelaea
- Cryptazeca subcylindrica
- Mission Creek Oregonian (Cryptomastix magnidentata)
- Deroceras tarraceuse
- Marbled disc (Discus marmorensis)
- Elasmias cernicum
- Elasmias kitaiwojimanum
- Falkneria camerani
- Gonyostomus insularis
- Lamellidea biplicata
- Lamellidea ogasawarana
- Microcystina sp. nov. 'Ba Tai'
- Tongaland cannibal snail (Natalina wesseliana)
- Neniatlanta pauli
- Nesokaliella intermedia
- Nesokaliella minuta
- Nesokaliella subturritula
- Nesopupa madgei
- Obelus despreauxii
- Obelus moratus
- Orcula zilchi
- Boulder pile mountain snail (Oreohelix jugalis)
- Vortex banded mountain snail (Oreohelix vortex)
- Lava rock mountain snail (Oreohelix waltoni)
- Pachnodus lionneti
- Pachnodus praslinus
- Partula hyalina
- Cataract gorge snail (Pasmaditta jungermanniae)
- Ptychalaea dedecora
- Punctum seychellarum
- Samoana margaritae
- Sheldonia puzeyi
- Speleodentorcula beroni
- Stylodonta unidentata
- Thaumatodon laddi
- Trochomorpha abrochroa
- Trochomorpha accurata
- Videna electra
- Vitrea pseudotrolli
- Zyzzyxdonta alata

Subspecies

- Chlorilis hungerfordiana rufopila
- Spelaeodiscus triarius tatricus

==== Littorinimorpha ====
There are 324 species and seven subspecies in the order Littorinimorpha assessed as vulnerable.

===== Hydrobiids =====
Species

- Akiyoshia kobayashii
- Alzoniella cornucopia
- Alzoniella elliptica
- Alzoniella fabrianensis
- Alzoniella feneriensis
- Alzoniella haicabia
- Alzoniella junqua
- Alzoniella lunensis
- Alzoniella navarrensis
- Alzoniella perrisii
- Alzoniella somiedoensis
- Antrobia breweri
- Blue spring aphaostracon (Aphaostracon asthenes)
- Freemouth hydrobe snail (Aphaostracon chalarogyrus)
- Wekiwa hydrobe (Aphaostracon monas)
- Dense hydrobe (Aphaostracon pycnus)
- Arganiella wolfi
- Beddomeia angulata
- Beddomeia averni
- Beddomeia bellii
- Beddomeia bowryensis
- Beddomeia briansmithi
- Beddomeia camensis
- Beddomeia forthensis
- Beddomeia franklandensis
- Beddomeia fromensis
- Beddomeia fultoni
- Beddomeia gibba
- Beddomeia hallae
- Beddomeia hullii
- Beddomeia inflata
- Beddomeia kershawi
- Beddomeia kessneri
- Beddomeia krybetes
- Beddomeia launcestonensis
- Beddomeia lodderae
- Beddomeia mesibovi
- Beddomeia minima
- Beddomeia petterdi
- Beddomeia phasianella
- Beddomeia protuberata
- Beddomeia ronaldi
- Beddomeia salmonis
- Beddomeia tasmanica
- Beddomeia topsiae
- Beddomeia turnerae
- Beddomeia waterhouseae
- Beddomeia wilmotensis
- Beddomeia wiseae
- Beddomeia zeehanensis
- Belgrandia gfrast
- Belgrandia gibberula
- Belgrandia latina
- Belgrandia silviae
- Belgrandia sp. nov. 'wiwanensis'
- Dalmatian belgrande (Belgrandia torifera)
- Belgrandiella angelovi
- Belgrandiella bulgarica
- Belgrandiella bureschi
- Belgrandiella croatica
- Belgrandiella crucis
- Belgrandiella dobrostanica
- Belgrandiella edessana
- Belgrandiella fuchsi
- Belgrandiella globulosa
- Belgrandiella hershleri
- Belgrandiella hessei
- Belgrandiella pusilla
- Belgrandiella schleschi
- Belgrandiella substricta
- Belgrandiella superior
- Belgrandiella zagoraensis
- Belgrandiella zermanica
- Boetersiella davisi
- Boleana umbilicata
- Bythinella angelitae
- Bythinella cebennensis
- Bythinella eurystoma
- Bythinella galerae
- Bythinella geisserti
- Bythinella ginolensis
- Bythinella isolata
- Bythinella jourdei
- Bythinella kapelana
- Bythinella kazdaghensis
- Bythinella micherdzinskii
- Bythinella molcsany
- Bythinella occasiuncula
- Bythinella padiraci
- Bythinella robiciana
- Bythinella rondelaudi
- Bythinella roubionensis
- Bythinella rubiginosa
- Bythinella vimperei
- Bythinella wawrzineki
- Bythiospeum acicula
- Bythiospeum drouetianum
- Bythiospeum exiguum
- Bythiospeum geyeri
- Bythiospeum haessleini
- Bythiospeum heldii
- Bythiospeum helveticum
- Hungarian blind snail (Bythiospeum hungaricum)
- Danubial blind snail (Bythiospeum oshanovae)
- Bythiospeum rasini
- Bythiospeum reisalpense
- Bythiospeum saxigenum
- Bythiospeum suevicum
- Bythiospeum waegelei
- Caledoconcha mariapetrae
- Catapyrgus sororius
- Cavernisa zaschevi
- Phantom cave snail (Cochliopa texana)
- Miller's snail (Cochliopina milleri)
- Harney Basin duskysnail (Colligyrus depressus)
- Durangonella de Coahuila snail (Durangonella coahuilae)
- Crystal siltsnail (Floridobia helicogyra)
- Ichetucknee siltsnail (Floridobia mica)
- Enterprise siltsnail (Floridobia monroensis)
- Pygmy siltsnail (Floridobia parva)
- Ponderous siltsnail (Floridobia ponderosa)
- Seminole siltsnail (Floridobia vanhyningi)
- Wekiwa siltsnail (Floridobia wekiwae)
- North Pine River freshwater snail (Fluvidona anodonta)
- Fluvidona dyeriana
- Fonscochlea accepta
- Fonscochlea conica
- Missouri cavesnail (Fontigens antroecetes)
- Ginaia munda
- Graecoanatolica kocapinarica
- Graziana quadrifoglio
- Graziana slavonica
- Guadiella andalucesis
- Guadiella arconadae
- Guadiella ramosae
- Hadopyrgus rawhiti
- Hadziella deminuta
- Hadziella krkae
- Hadziella sketi
- Hauffenia danubialis
- Hauffenia media
- Hauffenia sp. nov.
- Hauffenia wagneri
- Hemistomia flexicolumella
- Hemistomia napaia
- Heraultiella exilis
- Horatia macedonica
- Horatia novoselensis
- Hydrobia djerbaensis
- Hydrobia luvilana
- Iberhoratia gatoa
- Iberhoratia morenoi
- Iglica acicularis
- Iglica elongata
- Iglica gracilis
- Iglica kleinzellensis
- Iglica langhofferi
- Iglica sidariensis
- Iglica tellinii
- Insignia macrostoma
- Islamia azarum
- Islamia bomangiana
- Islamia bosniaca
- Islamia cianensis
- Islamia epirana
- Islamia lagari
- Islamia spirata
- Jardinella coreena
- Jardinella corrugata
- Jardinella edgbastonensis
- Jardinella eulo
- Jardinella isolata
- Kerkia brezicensis
- Lanzaia kotlusae
- Lanzaia vjetrenicae
- Lanzaiopsis savinica
- Leiorhagium cathartes
- Leiorhagium orokau
- Leiorhagium supernum
- Leptopyrgus melbourni
- Flat pebblesnail (Lepyrium showalteri)
- Marstoniopsis croatica
- Mercuria bayonnensis
- Micropyrgula stankovici
- Nanocochlea monticola
- Nanocochlea pupoidea
- Neofossarulus stankovici
- Ohridohoratia polinskii
- Opacuincola caeca
- Opacuincola cervicesmadentes
- Opacuincola dulcinella
- Opacuincola eduardstraussi
- Opacuincola johannstraussi
- Opacuincola josefstraussi
- Opacuincola lentesferens
- Opacuincola ngatapuna
- Opacuincola ovata
- Opacuincola permutata
- Palacanthilhiopsis margritae
- Palacanthilhiopsis vervierii
- Paladilhiopsis buresi
- Paladilhiopsis grobbeni
- Paladilhiopsis thessalica
- Paludiscala de oro snail (Paludiscala caramba)
- Paraprososthenia lynnei
- Phrantela annamurrayae
- Phrantela conica
- Phrantela kutikina
- Mimic cavesnail (Phreatodrobia imitata)
- Plagigeyeria gladilini
- Plagigeyeria stochi
- Pontobelgrandiella nitida
- Potamopyrgus doci
- Potamopyrgus kaitunuparaoa
- Pseudamnicola anteisensis
- Pseudamnicola bacescui
- Pseudamnicola chia
- Pseudamnicola gasulli
- Pseudamnicola hydrobiopsis
- Pseudamnicola intranodosa
- Pseudamnicola malickyi
- Pseudamnicola meluzzii
- Pseudamnicola pieperi
- Pseudamnicola pisolinus
- Pseudohoratia brusinae
- Pseudohoratia lacustris
- Pseudohoratia ochridana
- Pyrgohydrobia grochmalickii
- Pyrgohydrobia sanctinaumi
- Amargosa springsnail (Pyrgulopsis amargosae)
- Pyrgulopsis avernalis
- Grand Wash springsnail (Pyrgulopsis bacchus)
- Kingman springsnail (Pyrgulopsis conica)
- Diablo range pyrg (Pyrgulopsis diablensis)
- Gila springsnail (Pyrgulopsis gilae)
- South Sierra Nevada springsnail (Pyrgulopsis giuliani)
- Verde Rim springsnail (Pyrgulopsis glandulosa)
- Kern River pyrg (Pyrgulopsis greggi)
- Montezuma Well springsnail (Pyrgulopsis montezumensis)
- Roswell springsnail (Pyrgulopsis roswellensis)
- Radomaniola callosa
- Radomaniola rhodopensis
- Rhamphopoma magnum
- Sadleriana supercarinata
- Saxurinator brandti
- Stankovicia pavlovici
- Stankovicia wagneri
- Sculpin snail (Stiobia nana)
- Strugia ohridana
- Bliss Rapids snail (Taylorconcha serpenticola)
- Tefennia tefennica
- Tongapyrgus kohitatea
- Trochidrobia minuta
- Trochidrobia smithi
- Turcorientalia anatolica
- Turcorientalia hohenackeri
- Turricaspia ismailensis
- Victodrobia millerae
- Xestopyrgula dybowskii

Subspecies

- Mexipyrgus de carranza snail (Mexipyrgus churinceanus carranzae)
- Mexipyrgus churinceanus churinceanus
- Mexipyrgus de escobeda snail (Mexipyrgus churinceanus escobedae)
- Mexipyrgus de lugo snail (Mexipyrgus churinceanus lugoi)
- Mexipyrgus de west el Mojarral snail (Mexipyrgus churinceanus mojarralis)
- Mexipyrgus de east el Mojarral snail (Mexipyrgus churinceanus multilineatus)
- Mexithauma de cienegas snail (Mexipyrgus churinceanus quadripaludium)

===== Cochliopids =====
- Heleobia andecola
- Heleobia aperta
- Heleobia aponensis
- Heleobia galilaea
- Heleobia ortoni

===== Bithyniids =====
- Bithynia badiella
- Bithynia cettinensis
- Bithynia graeca
- Bithynia kobialkai
- Bithynia pseudemmericia
- Bithynia quintanai
- Bithynia yildirimii
- Congodoma zairensis
- Gabbia pallidula
- Pseudobithynia ambrakis
- Pseudobithynia kirka
- Sierraia expansilabrum
- Sierraia leonensis

===== Moitessieriids =====
- Moitessieria calloti
- Moitessieria foui
- Moitessieria guadelopensis
- Moitessieria juvenisanguis
- Moitessieria lludrigaensis
- Moitessieria massoti
- Moitessieria mugae
- Moitessieria nezi
- Paladilhia jamblussensis
- Paladilhia roselloi
- Paladilhia umbilicata
- Palaospeum bessoni
- Spiralix gloriae
- Spiralix pequenoensis

===== Assimineids =====
- Acmella sp. nov. 'Ba Tai'
- Badwater snail (Assiminea infirma)
- Fijianella calciphila
- Fijianella cornucopia
- Fijianella laddi
- Omphalotropis costulata
- Omphalotropis longula
- Omphalotropis rosea

===== Pomatiopsids =====
- Hubendickia pellucida
- Hydrorissoia munensis
- Jullienia albaobscura
- Jullienia costata
- Jullienia flava
- Jullienia minima
- Jullienia prasongi
- Lacunopsis deiecta
- Lacunopsis globosa
- Lacunopsis minutarpiettei
- Lacunopsis munensis
- Oncomelania nosophora
- Pachydrobia bertini
- Pachydrobia levayi
- Tricula conica
- Tricula mahadevensis

===== Amnicolids =====
- Amnicola cora
- Stygian amnicola (Amnicola stygius)
- Emmericia expansilabris
- Emmericia ventricosa

===== Other Littorinimorpha species =====
- Cremnoconchus conicus
- Modoc pebblesnail (Fluminicola modoci)
- Pseudobenedictia michnoi
- Stenothyra decollata
- Stenothyra laotiensis

==== Sorbeoconcha ====
There are 55 species in the order Sorbeoconcha assessed as vulnerable.

===== Pleurocerids =====
- Anthony's riversnail (Athearnia anthonyi)
- Acute elimia (Elimia acuta)
- Mud elimia (Elimia alabamensis)
- Coal elimia (Elimia aterina)
- Flaxen elimia (Elimia boykiniana)
- Spindle elimia (Elimia capillaris)
- Lacy elimia (Elimia crenatella)
- Silt elimia (Elimia haysiana)
- Gladiator elimia (Elimia hydei)
- Knotty elimia (Elimia interrupta)
- Round-rib elimia (Elimia nassula)
- Caper elimia (Elimia olivula)
- Nymph elimia (Elimia porrecta)
- Spring elimia (Elimia pybasi)
- Brook elimia (Elimia strigosa)
- Elegant elimia (Elimia teres)
- Puzzle elimia (Elimia varians)
- Leptoxis ampla
- Knob mudalia (Leptoxis minor)
- Spotted rocksnail (Leptoxis picta)
- Mainstream river snail (Leptoxis praerosa)
- Smooth rocksnail (Leptoxis virgata)
- Armigerous river snail (Lithasia armigera)
- Dutton's river snail (Lithasia duttoniana)
- Muddy rocksnail (Lithasia salebrosa)
- Rugged hornsnail (Pleurocera alveare)
- Ringed hornsnail (Pleurocera annulifera)
- Spiral hornsnail (Pleurocera brumbyi)
- Shortspire hornsnail (Pleurocera curta)
- Upland hornsnail (Pleurocera showalteri)
- Telescope hornsnail (Pleurocera walkeri)

===== Melanopsids =====
- Esperiana sangarica
- Melanopsis subgraellsiana

===== Thiarids =====
- Melanoides depravata
- Melanoides dupuisi
- Melanoides mweruensis
- Melanoides truncatelliformis
- Semisulcospira decipiens
- Semisulcospira niponica
- Semisulcospira ourense

===== Pachychilids =====
- Brotia annamita
- Brotia citrina
- Brotia hoabinhensis
- Brotia laodelectata
- Brotia paludiformis
- Brotia solemiana
- Brotia subgloriosa
- Brotia wykoffi
- Potadoma alutacea
- Potadoma vogeli

===== Paludomids =====
- Cleopatra cridlandi
- Cleopatra exarata
- Cleopatra obscura
- Reymondia tanganyicensis
- Tanganyicia michelae

==== Architaenioglossa ====
Species

- Acicula benoiti
- Acicula multilineata
- Acicula norrisi
- Acicula palaestinensis
- Amphicyclotulus liratus
- Amphicyclotulus perplexus
- Boucardicus albocinctus
- Boucardicus antiquus
- Boucardicus rakotoarisoni
- Boucardicus tridentatus
- Slender campeloma (Campeloma decampi)
- Cochlostoma acutum
- Cochlostoma affine
- Cochlostoma canestrinii
- Cochlostoma erika
- Cochlostoma fuchsi
- Cochlostoma paladilhianum
- Craspedopoma lyonnetianum
- Cyathopoma randalana
- Diancta macrostoma
- Ditropis whitei
- Fijiopoma diatreta
- Hedleya macleayi
- Lanistes ciliatus
- Lanistes farleri
- Cylindrical lioplax (Lioplax cyclostomaformis)
- Opisthostoma bihamulatum
- Opisthostoma michaelis
- Palaina godeffroyana
- Palaina strigata
- Palaina subregularis
- Platyla foliniana
- Platyla jankowskiana
- Platyla lusitanica
- Platyla maasseni
- Platyla peloponnesica
- Platyla procax
- Platyrhaphe sp. nov. 1
- Plectostoma senex
- Pomacea palmeri
- Pomacea quinindensis
- Renea gentilei
- Renea gormonti
- Renea paillona
- Suavocallia splendens

Subspecies

- Renea moutonii moutonii
- Renea moutonii singularis

==== Lower Heterobranchia species ====
- Glacidorbis occidentalis
- Valvata hirsutecostata
- Valvata relicta
- Utah roundmouth snail (Valvata utahensis)
- Emerald valvata (Valvata virens)

==== Cycloneritimorpha ====
- Georissa laseroni
- Monterissa gowerensis
- Neritina granosa
- Theodoxus marteli
- Theodoxus numidicus

==== Hygrophila ====
Species

- Rocky Mountain capshell (Acroloxus coloradensis)
- Acroloxus egirdirensis
- Acroloxus improvisus
- Acroloxus tetensi
- Ancylus scalariformis
- Bulinus mutandensis
- Bulinus obtusus
- Chilina angusta
- Newcomb's snail (Erinna newcombi)
- Gyraulus albidus
- Gyraulus argaeicus
- Gyraulus bakeri
- Gyraulus bekaensis
- Gyraulus nedyalkovi
- Gyraulus pamphylicus
- Kutikina hispida
- Lymnaea ovalior
- Miratesta celebensis
- Wet wall snail (Physa zionis)
- Cave physa (Physella spelunca)
- Utah physa (Physella utahensis)
- Wet rock physa (Physella zionis)
- Magnificent ramshorn (Planorbella magnifica)
- Lamb ramshorn (Planorbella oregonensis)
- Planorbis presbensis
- Domed ancylid (Rhodacmea elatior)

Subspecies

- Gyraulus connollyi exilis

==== Neogastropoda ====
There are 27 species in the order Neogastropoda assessed as vulnerable.

===== Conids =====
- Conus allaryi
- Florida cone (Conus anabathrum)
- Conus ardisiaceus
- Conus cacao
- Conus cepasi
- Conus compressus
- Conus cuvieri
- Conus decoratus
- Conus duffyi
- Conus felitae
- Conus fontonae
- Conus guinaicus
- Conus henckesi
- Conus hennequini
- Hieroglyphic cone (Conus hieroglyphus)
- Conus immelmani
- Conus jeanmartini
- Conus julii
- Conus melvilli
- Conus rawaiensis
- Conus regonae
- Richard's cone (Conus richardbinghami)
- Conus stearnsii
- Conus tacomae
- Conus teodorae
- Conus thevenardensis
- Conus xicoi

==== Eupulmonata ====
- Zospeum biscaiense
- Zospeum exiguum

=== Bivalvia ===
There are 49 species and two subspecies in the class Bivalvia assessed as vulnerable.

==== Unionida ====
There are 37 species and two subspecies in the order Unionoida assessed as vulnerable.

===== Margaritiferids =====
- Margaritifera middendorffi

===== Unionids =====
Species

- Dwarf wedgemussel (Alasmidonta heterodon)
- Brazzaea anceyi
- Coelatura lobensis
- Coelatura rotula
- Cuneopsis rufescens
- Roanoke slabshell (Elliptio roanokensis)
- Purple bankclimber (Elliptoideus sloatianus)
- Long solid mussel (Fusconaia subrotunda)
- Lamprotula blaisei
- Lamprotula polysticta
- Lamprotula rochechouartii
- Lamprotula scripta
- Lamprotula tortuosa
- Pink mucket (Lampsilis abrupta)
- Lampsilis dolabraeformis
- Microcondylaea bonellii
- Mweruella mweruensis
- Southern hickorynut (Obovaria jacksoniana)
- Parreysia khadakvaslaensis
- Tennessee clubshell (Pleurobema oviforme)
- Fuzzy pigtoe (Pleurobema strodeanum)
- Fat pocketbook pearly mussel (Potamilus capax)
- Depressed river mussel (Pseudanodonta complanata)
- Savannah lilliput (Toxolasma pullus)
- Unio terminalis
- Unio tumidiformis

Subspecies

- Lampsilis reeviana reeviana

===== Hyriids =====
- Castalia martensi
- Diplodon expansus
- Diplodon pfeifferi
- Carter's freshwater mussel (Westralunio carteri)

===== Iridinids =====
Species

- Aspatharia divaricata
- Chambardia nyassaensis
- Mutela alata
- Mutela franci
- Mutela legumen

Subspecies

- Chambardia wahlbergi guillaini

===== Mycetopodids =====
- Diplodontites olssoni

==== Cardiida ====
- Southern giant clam (Tridacna derasa)
- Giant clam (Tridacna gigas)
- Tevoro clam (Tridacna mbalavuana)
- Tridacna rosewateri

==== Arcida ====
- Scaphula nagarjunai

==== Venerida ====
- Congeria kusceri
- Dreissena blanci
- Pisidium artifex
- Pisidium centrale
- Pisidium sanguinichristi
- Montane peaclam (Pisidium ultramontanum)
- River orb mussel (Sphaerium rivicola)

=== Cephalopods ===
- Opisthoteuthis calypso
- Opisthoteuthis massyae

== Cnidaria ==
There are 203 species in the phylum Cnidaria assessed as vulnerable.

=== Hydrozoa ===
- Millepora foveolata
- Millepora latifolia
- Millepora striata

=== Anthozoa ===
There are 202 species in the class Anthozoa assessed as vulnerable.

==== Scleractinia ====
There are 199 species in the order Scleractinia assessed as vulnerable.

===== Euphyllids =====
- Catalaphyllia jardinei
- Euphyllia ancora
- Euphyllia cristata
- Euphyllia paraancora
- Euphyllia paradivisa
- Euphyllia paraglabrescens
- Nemenzophyllia turbida
- Physogyra lichtensteini
- Plerogyra discus

===== Dendrophylliids =====
- Turbinaria bifrons
- Turbinaria heronensis
- Turbinaria mesenterina
- Turbinaria patula
- Turbinaria peltata
- Turbinaria reniformis
- Turbinaria stellulata

===== Acroporids =====
- Acropora abrolhosensis
- Acropora aculeus
- Acropora acuminata
- Acropora anthocercis
- Acropora aspera
- Acropora awi
- Acropora batunai
- Acropora caroliniana
- Acropora dendrum
- Acropora derawanensis
- Acropora desalwii
- Acropora donei
- Acropora echinata
- Acropora elegans
- Acropora globiceps
- Acropora hemprichii
- Acropora hoeksemai
- Acropora horrida
- Acropora indonesia
- Acropora jacquelineae
- Acropora kimbeensis
- Acropora kirstyae
- Acropora kosurini
- Acropora listeri
- Acropora loisetteae
- Acropora lokani
- Acropora lovelli
- Acropora microclados
- Acropora multiacuta
- Acropora palmerae
- Acropora paniculata
- Acropora papillare
- Acropora pharaonis
- Acropora plumosa
- Acropora polystoma
- Acropora retusa
- Acropora russelli
- Acropora simplex
- Acropora solitaryensis
- Acropora speciosa
- Acropora spicifera
- Acropora striata
- Acropora tenella
- Acropora turaki
- Acropora vaughani
- Acropora verweyi
- Acropora walindii
- Acropora willisae
- Anacropora matthai
- Anacropora puertogalerae
- Anacropora reticulata
- Astreopora cucullata
- Astreopora incrustans
- Astreopora moretonensis
- Isopora brueggemanni
- Isopora crateriformis
- Isopora cuneata
- Montipora altasepta
- Montipora angulata
- Montipora australiensis
- Montipora cactus
- Montipora calcarea
- Montipora caliculata
- Leaf plate montipora (Montipora capricornis)
- Montipora cebuensis
- Montipora cocosensis
- Montipora corbettensis
- Montipora crassituberculata
- Montipora delicatula
- Montipora flabellata
- Montipora florida
- Montipora friabilis
- Montipora gaimardi
- Montipora hodgsoni
- Montipora lobulata
- Montipora mactanensis
- Montipora malampaya
- Montipora meandrina
- Montipora orientalis
- Montipora patula
- Montipora samarensis
- Montipora stilosa
- Montipora turtlensis
- Montipora verruculosus
- Montipora vietnamensis

===== Poritids =====
- Alveopora allingi
- Alveopora daedalea
- Alveopora fenestrata
- Alveopora gigas
- Alveopora japonica
- Alveopora marionensis
- Alveopora verrilliana
- Goniopora albiconus
- Goniopora burgosi
- Goniopora cellulosa
- Goniopora planulata
- Goniopora polyformis
- Porites aranetai
- Porites attenuata
- Porites cocosensis
- Porites cumulatus
- Porites horizontalata
- Porites napopora
- Porites nigrescens
- Porites okinawensis
- Porites rugosa
- Porites sillimaniana
- Porites sverdrupi
- Porites tuberculosa
- Poritipora paliformis

===== Brain corals =====
- Australogyra zelli
- Barabattoia laddi
- Caulastrea connata
- Caulastrea curvata
- Caulastrea echinulata
- Cyphastrea agassizi
- Cyphastrea hexasepta
- Cyphastrea ocellina
- Echinopora ashmorensis
- Echinopora robusta
- Favia rosaria
- Favites spinosa
- Goniastrea deformis
- Goniastrea ramosa
- Leptastrea aequalis
- Leptoria irregularis
- Montastraea franksi
- Montastrea multipunctata
- Montastrea salebrosa
- Montastrea serageldini
- Moseleya latistellata
- Platygyra yaeyamaensis

===== Pocilloporids =====
- Pocillopora ankeli
- Pocillopora danae
- Pocillopora elegans
- Pocillopora indiania
- Pocillopora inflata
- Seriatopora aculeata
- Seriatopora dendritica

===== Mussids =====
- Acanthastrea bowerbanki
- Acanthastrea brevis
- Acanthastrea faviaformis
- Acanthastrea hemprichii
- Acanthastrea ishigakiensis
- Acanthastrea regularis
- Lobophyllia dentatus
- Lobophyllia diminuta
- Lobophyllia flabelliformis
- Rough cactus coral (Mycetophyllia ferox)
- Symphyllia hassi

===== Pectiniids =====
- Echinophyllia costata
- Mycedium steeni
- Pectinia africanus
- Pectinia alcicornis
- Pectinia lactuca

===== Agariciids =====
- Lamarck's sheet coral (Agaricia lamarcki)
- Leptoseris incrustans
- Leptoseris yabei
- Pachyseris involuta
- Pachyseris rugosa
- Pavona bipartita
- Pavona cactus
- Pavona danai
- Cactus coral (Pavona decussata)
- Pavona diffluens
- Pavona venosa

===== Fungiids =====
- Fungia curvata
- Fungia seychellensis
- Fungia taiwanensis
- Halomitra clavator
- Heliofungia actiniformis

===== Other Scleractinia species =====
- Crisp pillow coral (Anomastraea irregularis)
- Coscinaraea hahazimaensis
- Elliptical star coral (Dichocoenia stokesii)
- Galaxea acrhelia
- Galaxea astreata
- Galaxea cryptoramosa
- Horastrea indica
- Ivory bush coral (Oculina varicosa)
- Polycyathus isabela
- Psammocora stellata
- Stylocoeniella cocosensis

==== Other Anthozoa species ====
- Pink sea fan (Eunicella verrucosa)
- Blue coral (Heliopora coerulea)
- Starlet sea anemone (Nematostella vectensis)

== Arthropods ==
There are 1080 arthropod species and 29 arthropod subspecies assessed as vulnerable.

=== Seed shrimps ===
- Fabaeformiscandona aemonae
- Leucocythere helenae
- Limnocythere porphyretica
- Newnhamia fuscata
- Newnhamia insolita
- Pseudocandona cavicola
- Pseudocandona pretneri
- Pseudocandona trigonelia
- Zonocypretta kalimna

=== Arachnids ===
There are 47 arachnid species assessed as vulnerable.

==== Spiders ====
- Andasta benoiti
- Argyrodella pusillus
- Argyrodes cognatus
- Argyrodes fissifrontellus
- Baviola braueri
- Baviola vanmoli
- Brignolia trichinalis
- Carrhotus bellus
- Cenemus culiculus
- Cousinea keeleyi
- Great raft spider (Dolomedes plantarius)
- Goleba pallens
- Grammostola vachoni
- Hasarius rufociliatus
- Mesida thorelli
- Dolloff cave spider (Meta dolloff)
- Nesiergus insulanus
- Ouette ouette
- Jean's jumping spider (Paraheliophanus jeanae)
- St Helenian jumping spider (Paraheliophanus sanctaehelenae)
- Under-equipped jumping spider (Paraheliophanus subinstructus)
- Glacier Bay wolf spider (Pardosa diuturna)
- Phycosoma spundana
- Mysore ornamental (Poecilotheria striata)
- Rhomphaea barycephala
- Roche roche
- Sadies fulgida
- Sadies seychellensis
- Silhouettella curieusei
- Soeuria soeur
- Lake Placid funnel wolf spider (Sosippus placidus)
- Stoda libudum
- Notable large burrowing spider (Thrigmopoeus insignis)
- Troglohyphantes gracilis
- Troglohyphantes similis
- Troglohyphantes spinipes
- Xerophaeus espoir

==== Other arachnid species ====
- Bamazomus aviculus
- Melones cave harvestman (Banksula melones)
- Beierolpium benoiti
- Seychelles small whip spider (Charinus seychellarum)
- Seychelles giant scorpion (Chiromachus ochropus)
- Empire cave pseudoscorpion (Fissilicreagris imperialis)
- Ibalonius flavopictus
- Nesowithius seychellesensis
- Indian Ocean whip spider (Phrynichus scaber)
- Xenolpium insulare

=== Branchiopoda ===
- Alona hercegovinae
- Alona sketi
- Alona smirnovi
- Vernal pool fairy shrimp (Branchinecta lynchi)
- Branchinella apophysata
- Branchinella basispina
- Branchinella denticulata
- Branchinella simplex
- Branchinella wellardi
- Chirocephalus croaticus
- Chirocephalus pelagonicus
- Chirocephalus reiseri
- Daphnia coronata
- Daphnia jollyi
- Daphnia nivalis
- Daphnia occidentalis
- Eoleptestheria spinosa
- Imnadia banatica
- Imnadia cristata
- Imnadia panonica
- Parartemia contracta
- Rhynchochydorus australiensis

=== Millipedes ===
- Solitary black millipede (Doratogonus avius)
- Bearded black millipede (Doratogonus barbatus)
- Herbert's black millipede (Doratogonus herberti)
- Hoffman's black millipede (Doratogonus hoffmani)
- Southern black millipede (Doratogonus meridionalis)
- Natal black millipede (Doratogonus natalensis)
- Precarious black millipede (Doratogonus precarius)
- Eutrichodesmus griseus
- Hyperothrix orophura
- Plusioglyphiulus boutini
- Pterozonium braueri
- Rhinotus crassiceps

=== Maxillopoda ===
Maxillopoda includes barnacles, copepods and a number of related animals. There are 71 species in the class Maxillopoda assessed as vulnerable.

==== Calanoida ====
There are 47 species in the order Calanoida assessed as vulnerable.

===== Diaptomids =====
- Aglaodiaptomus kingsburyae
- Aglaodiaptomus marshianus
- Allodiaptomus satanas
- Arctodiaptomus burduricus
- Arctodiaptomus euacanthus
- Arctodiaptomus kamtschaticus
- Arctodiaptomus michaeli
- Dussartius baeticus
- Eodiaptomus lumholtzi
- Eodiaptomus shihi
- Heliodiaptomus kolleruensis
- Heliodiaptomus pulcher
- Hesperodiaptomus augustaensis
- Hesperodiaptomus californiensis
- Lovenula excellens
- Lovenula simplex
- Mastigodiaptomus purpureus
- Metadiaptomus capensis
- Metadiaptomus purcelli
- Neodiaptomus intermedius
- Neodiaptomus laii
- Neodiaptomus lymphatus
- Neodiaptomus physalipus
- Notodiaptomus dubius
- Notodiaptomus maracaibensis
- Paradiaptomus natalensis
- Phyllodiaptomus wellekensae
- Skistodiaptomus carolinensis
- Stygodiaptomus kieferi
- Stygodiaptomus petkovskii
- Thermodiaptomus galeboides
- Tropodiaptomus burundensis
- Tropodiaptomus kilimensis
- Tropodiaptomus kissi
- Tropodiaptomus neumanni
- Tropodiaptomus simplex
- Tropodiaptomus stuhlmanni

===== Centropagids =====
- Boeckella bispinosa
- Boeckella calcaris
- Boeckella geniculata
- Boeckella nyoraensis
- Boeckella shieli
- Calamoecia australica
- Calamoecia elongata
- Calamoecia zeidleri
- Hemiboeckella powellensis

===== Temorids =====
- Epischura baikalensis

==== Cyclopoida ====
- Acanthocyclops hypogeus
- Mesocyclops insulensis
- Metacyclops gasparoi
- Metacyclops postojnae
- Tropocyclops federensis
- Tropocyclops nananae

==== Harpacticoida ====
There are 18 species in the order Harpacticoida assessed as vulnerable.

===== Darcythompsoniids =====
- Leptocaris stromatolicolus

===== Ameirids =====
- Nitocrella slovenica
- Nitocrella stochi

===== Canthocamptids =====
- Canthocamptus dedeckkeri
- Canthocamptus echinopyge
- Canthocamptus longipes
- Canthocamptus mammillifurca
- Canthocamptus sublaevis
- Canthocamptus tasmaniae
- Ceuthonectes rouchi
- Elaphoidella amabilis
- Elaphoidella franci
- Elaphoidella jeanneli
- Elaphoidella kieferi
- Fibulacamptus bisetosus
- Fibulacamptus gracilior
- Paramorariopsis anae
- Pseudomoraria triglavensis

=== Malacostracans ===
Malacostraca includes crabs, lobsters, crayfish, shrimp, krill, woodlice, and many others. There are 307 malacostracan species and 14 malacostracan subspecies assessed as vulnerable.

==== Isopods ====
Species

- Madison cave isopod (Antrolana lira)
- Arubolana imula
- Bat cave isopod (Caecidotea macropoda)
- Nickajack cave isopod (Caecidotea nickajackensis)
- Calconiscellus gottscheensis
- Haplophthalmus abbreviatus
- Haplophthalmus rhinoceros
- Rye Cove cave isopod (Lirceus culveri)
- Metatrichoniscoides celticus
- Mexilana saluposi
- Mexistenasellus nulemex
- Parzefall's stenasellid (Mexistenasellus parzefalli)
- Wilken's stenasellid (Mexistenasellus wilkensi)
- Monolistra calopyge
- Monolistra schottlaenderi
- Moserius percoi
- Onchotelson brevicaudatus
- Onchotelson spatulatus
- Proasellus parvulus
- Proasellus slovenicus
- Sphaerolana karenae
- Sumatrillo sp. nov. 'HC - blind'
- Uramphisopus pearsoni

Subspecies

- Androniscus stygius dentatus
- Asellus aquaticus cavernicolus
- Proasellus pavani orientalis

==== Amphipods ====
There are 56 amphipod species and four amphipod subspecies assessed as vulnerable.

===== Hadziids =====
Subspecies

- Hadzia fragilis stochi

===== Paramelitids =====
- Paramelita flexa

===== Gammarids =====
- Bousfield's amphipod (Gammarus bousfieldi)
- Diminutive amphipod (Gammarus hyalelloides)
- Pecos amphipod (Gammarus pecos)

===== Crangonyctids =====
- Central Missouri cave amphipod (Allocrangonyx hubrichti)
- Oklahoma cave amphipod (Allocrangonyx pellucidus)
- Florida cave amphipod (Crangonyx grandimanus)
- Hobb's cave amphipod (Crangonyx hobbsi)
- Tidewater interstitial amphipod (Stygobromus araeus)
- Arizona cave amphipod (Stygobromus arizonensis)
- Balcones cave amphipod (Stygobromus balconis)
- Barr's cave amphipod (Stygobromus barri)
- Bifurcated cave amphipod (Stygobromus bifurcatus)
- Bowman's cave amphipod (Stygobromus bowmani)
- Clanton's cave amphipod (Stygobromus clantoni)
- Burnsville Cove cave amphipod (Stygobromus conradi)
- Cooper's cave amphipod (Stygobromus cooperi)
- Cascade cave amphipod (Stygobromus dejectus)
- Elevated spring amphipod (Stygobromus elatus)
- Greenbrier cave amphipod (Stygobromus emarginatus)
- Ephemeral cave amphipod (Stygobromus ephemerus)
- Ezell's cave amphipod (Stygobromus flagellatus)
- Grady's cave amphipod (Stygobromus gradyi)
- Devil's sinkhole amphipod (Stygobromus hadenoecus)
- Hara's cave amphipod (Stygobromus harai)
- Pickle springs amphipod (Stygobromus heteropodus)
- Malheur cave amphipod (Stygobromus hubbsi)
- Tidewater stygonectid amphipod (Stygobromus identatus)
- Long-legged cave amphipod (Stygobromus longipes)
- Mackenzie's cave amphipod (Stygobromus mackenziei)
- Mountain cave amphipod (Stygobromus montanus)
- Morrison's cave amphipod (Stygobromus morrisoni)
- Bath County cave amphipod (Stygobromus mundus)
- Norton's cave amphipod (Stygobromus nortoni)
- Onondaga cave amphipod (Stygobromus onondagaensis)
- Ozark cave amphipod (Stygobromus ozarkensis)
- Minute cave amphipod (Stygobromus parvus)
- Pizzini's amphipod (Stygobromus pizzinii)
- Wisconsin well amphipod (Stygobromus putealis)
- Reddell's cave amphipod (Stygobromus reddelli)
- Alabama well amphipod (Stygobromus smithii)
- Spring cave amphipod (Stygobromus spinatus)
- Stellmack's cave amphipod (Stygobromus stellmacki)
- Subtle cave amphipod (Stygobromus subtilis)
- Wengeror's cave amphipod (Stygobromus wengerorum)

===== Niphargids =====
Species

- Carinurella paradoxa
- Niphargobates lefkodemonaki
- Niphargobates orophobata
- Niphargus aberrans
- Niphargus hadzii
- Niphargus hrabei
- Niphargus sphagnicolus
- Niphargus spoeckeri
- Niphargus stenopus
- Niphargus timavi
- Niphargus valachicus

Subspecies

- Niphargus ilidzensis slovenicus
- Niphargus orcinus orcinus
- Niphargus stygius stygius

==== Anaspidacea ====
- Allanaspides helonomus
- Hickman's pygmy mountain shrimp (Allanaspides hickmani)
- Eucrenonaspides oinotheke
- Great Lake shrimp (Paranaspides lacustris)

==== Decapods ====
There are 224 decapod species and seven decapod subspecies assessed as vulnerable.

===== Parastacids =====
- Astacoides betsileoensis
- Common yabby (Cherax destructor)
- Cherax papuanus
- Strzelecki burrowing crayfish (Engaeus rostrogaleatus)
- Engaeus urostrictus
- Burnie burrowing crayfish (Engaeus yabbimunna)
- Glenelg River crayfish (Euastacus bispinosus)
- Euastacus simplex
- Euastacus sulcatus
- New England crayfish (Euastacus suttoni)
- Euastacus yarreansis
- Geocharax falcata
- Ombrastacoides pulcher

===== Gecarcinucids =====
- Adeleana forcarti
- Arachnothelphusa melanippe
- Austrothelphusa tigrina
- Austrothelphusa valentula
- Heterothelphusa fatum
- Johnson's freshwater crab (Irmengardia johnsoni)
- Liotelphusa quadrata
- Mainitia mainitensis
- Mekhongthelphusa kengsaphu
- Mekhongthelphusa tetragona
- Nautilothelphusa zimmeri
- Oziotelphusa biloba
- Oziotelphusa hippocastanum
- Oziotelphusa ritigala
- Oziotelphusa stricta
- Oziotelphusa wagrakarowensis
- Parathelphusa balabac
- Parathelphusa cabayugan
- Parathelphusa crocea
- Parathelphusa maindroni
- Parathelphusa ovum
- Parathelphusa pantherina
- Parathelphusa possoensis
- Perbrinckia fenestra
- Perbrinckia integra
- Phricotelphusa callianira
- Phricotelphusa elegans
- Phricotelphusa limula
- Phricotelphusa ranongi
- Sayamia maehongsonensis
- Stygothelphusa bidiensis
- Sundathelphusa minahassae
- Sundathelphusa rubra

===== Atyids =====
- Archaetya chacei
- Atya ortmannioides
- Atyaephyra strymonensis
- Caridina ablepsia
- Caridina acuta
- Caridina acutirostris
- Caridina anislaq
- Caridina batuan
- Caridina boholensis
- Caridina breviata
- Caridina bunyonyiensis
- Caridina caerulea
- Caridina camaro
- Caridina caverna
- Caridina cavernicola
- Caridina demenica
- Caridina dianchiensis
- Caridina ensifera
- Caridina feixiana
- Caridina gordonae
- Caridina gortio
- Caridina guangxiensis
- Caridina leclerci
- Caridina longidigita
- Caridina mengae
- Caridina minidentata
- Caridina pseudodenticulata
- Caridina pseudonilotica
- Caridina samar
- Caridina sarasinorum
- Caridina schenkeli
- Caridina semiblepsia
- Caridina sodenensis
- Caridina spelunca
- Caridina trifasciata
- Caridina valencia
- Edoneus erwini
- Edoneus marulas
- Edoneus sketi
- Marosina brevirostris
- Marosina longirostris
- Neocaridina brevidactyla
- Kentucky cave shrimp (Palaemonias ganteri)
- Paracaridina longispina
- Parisia deharvengi
- Parisia macrophora
- Stygiocaris lancifera
- Stygiocaris stylifera
- Troglocaris bosnica
- Troglocaris kapelana
- Troglocaris neglecta
- Troglocaris prasence
- Typhlatya consobrina
- Typhlatya elenae
- Typhlatya garciadebrasi
- Typhlatya garciai
- Typhlatya miravetensis
- Typhlatya taina
- Typhlocaridina lanceifrons
- Typhlocaridina liui
- Typhlocaridina semityphlata

===== Cambarids =====
Species

- Short Mountain crayfish (Cambarus clivosus)
- Grandfather Mountain crayfish (Cambarus eeseeohensis)
- Elk River crayfish (Cambarus elkensis)
- Alabama cave crayfish (Cambarus jonesi)
- Saluda burrowing crayfish (Distocambarus hunteri)
- Newberry burrowing crayfish (Distocambarus youngineri)
- Daisy burrowing crayfish (Fallicambarus jeanae)
- Crittenden crayfish (Orconectes bisectus)
- Coldwater crayfish (Orconectes eupunctus)
- Yazoo crayfish (Orconectes hartfieldi)
- Tennessee cave crayfish (Orconectes incomptus)
- Big Creek crayfish (Orconectes peruncus)
- St. Francis River crayfish (Orconectes quadruncus)
- Kiamichi crayfish (Orconectes saxatilis)
- Crescent crayfish (Orconectes taylori)
- Hardin crayfish (Orconectes wrighti)
- Gabriel cave crayfish (Procambarus cavernicola)
- Procambarus citlaltepetl
- Procambarus ruthveni

Subspecies

- Calcasieu crayfish (Orconectes hathawayi blacki)
- Orconectes inermis testii
- Orconectes meeki brevis
- Procambarus lucifugus alachua
- Procambarus rogersi campestris
- Procambarus rogersi ochlocknensis
- Procambarus rogersi rogersi

===== Potamonautids =====
- Boreas uglowi
- Nimba stream crab (Liberonautes nimba)
- Madagapotamon humberti
- Potamonautes choloensis
- Potamonautes gerdalensis
- Potamonautes ignestii
- Potamonautes infravallatus
- Blue river crab (Potamonautes lividus)
- Potamonautes montivagus
- Potamonautes pilosus
- East African tree hole crab (Potamonautes raybouldi)
- Reid's river crab (Potamonautes reidi)
- Potamonautes triangulus
- Potamonautes unisulcatus
- Potamonautes xiphoidus
- Sachs's stream crab (Potamonemus sachsi)

===== Pseudothelphusids =====
- Allacanthos pittieri
- Chaceus ibiricensis
- Elsalvadoria zurstrasseni
- Epilobocera haytensis
- Epilobocera wetherbeei
- Fredius granulatus
- Hypolobocera alata
- Hypolobocera andagoensis
- Hypolobocera barbacensis
- Hypolobocera cajambrensis
- Hypolobocera gracilignatha
- Hypolobocera rathbuni
- Hypolobocera rotundilobata
- Hypolobocera velezi
- Lindacatalina sumacensis
- Microthelphusa forcarti
- Moritschus altaquerensis
- Moritschus ecuadorensis
- Neopseudothelphusa fossor
- Phrygiopilus acanthophallus
- Potamocarcinus hartmanni
- Potamocarcinus roatensis
- Ptychophallus tristani
- Raddaus mertensi
- Rodriguezus trujillensis

===== Potamids =====
- Cryptopotamon anacoluthon
- Geothelphusa miyakoensis
- South Australia crab (Geothelphusa nanao)
- Pingtung crab (Geothelphusa pingtung)
- Ze concept of crab (Geothelphusa takuan)
- Taroko crab (Geothelphusa taroko)
- Wang's crab (Geothelphusa wangi)
- Wutai crab (Geothelphusa wutai)
- Indochinamon cua
- Indochinamon dangi
- Indochinamon guttum
- Indochinamon mieni
- Iomon luangprabangense
- Isolapotamon bauense
- Johora counsilmani
- Johora gapensis
- Johora johorensis
- Johora thoi
- Malayopotamon granulatum
- Taiwan's South China Sea river crab (Nanhaipotamon formosanum)
- Nemoron nomas
- Parapotamon spinescens
- Potamon bileki
- Pupamon phrae
- Sinopotamon ebianense
- Sinopotamon hanyangense
- Stelomon erawanense
- Stelomon kanchanaburiense
- Stoliczia bella
- Stoliczia changmanae
- Stoliczia cognata
- Stoliczia goal
- Stoliczia karenae
- Stoliczia kedahensis
- Stoliczia leoi
- Stoliczia pahangensis
- Stoliczia panhai
- Stoliczia perlensis
- Stoliczia tweedei
- Tiwaripotamon edostilus

===== Palaemonids =====
- Leptopalaemon gibbosus
- Leptopalaemon gudjangah
- Leptopalaemon magelensis
- Macrobrachium acanthochirus
- Macrobrachium acherontium
- Macrobrachium elegantum
- Macrobrachium gurudeve
- Macrobrachium lingyunense
- Macrobrachium tuxtlaense
- Troglocubanus calcis
- Troglocubanus gibarensis
- Troglocubanus inermis

===== Trichodactylids =====
- Avotrichodactylus oaxensis
- Bottiella cucutensis
- Bottiella medemi

===== Other decapod species =====
- Noble crayfish (Astacus astacus)
- Common spiny lobster (Palinurus elephas)
- Typhlocaris salentina

=== Insects ===
There are 608 insect species and 15 insect subspecies assessed as vulnerable.

==== Flies ====
- Belkin's dune tabanid fly (Brennania belkini)
- Tasmanian torrent midge (Edwardsina tasmaniensis)
- Beautiful-winged fruit fly (Scaptomyza horaeoptera)

==== Plecoptera ====
- Otway stonefly (Eusthenia nothofagi)
- Mount Kosciusko wingless stonefly (Leptoperla cacuminis)

==== Notoptera ====
- Mount St Helens' grylloblattid (Grylloblatta chirurgica)

==== Orthoptera ====
There are 137 species in the order Orthoptera assessed as vulnerable.

===== Crickets =====
- Howarth's cave cricket (Caconemobius howarthi)
- Schauinsland's bush cricket (Caconemobius schauinslandi)
- Kaumana cave cricket (Caconemobius varius)
- Lanzarote malpais cricket (Hymenoptila lanzarotensis)
- Metioche luteolus
- Karpathos glandular cricket (Ovaliptila kinzelbachi)
- Dodecanese glandular cricket (Ovaliptila nana)
- Phalangacris phaloricephala
- Volcanoes cave cricket (Thaumatogryllus cavicola)
- Kauai thin-footed bush cricket (Thaumatogryllus variegatus)

===== Acridids =====
- Usambara slant-faced grasshopper (Acrida bara)
- Uvarov's bird grasshopper (Acridoderes uvarovi)
- Idaho point-headed grasshopper (Acrolophitus pulchellus)
- Usambara burrowing grasshopper (Acrotylus apicalis)
- Usambara forest edge grasshopper (Afrophlaeoba usambarica)
- Michigan bog grasshopper (Appalachia arcana)
- Wembere grasshopper (Aulacobothrus popovi)
- Tanzanian miombo grasshopper (Cardeniopsis regalis)
- Siskiyou chloealtis grasshopper (Chloealtis aspasma)
- White-tipped grasshopper (Chorthippus acroleucus)
- Ufipa blue-winged grasshopper (Chromochokwea fitzgeraldi)
- Calabrian gold grasshopper (Chrysochraon beybienkoi)
- Banat grasshopper (Eozubovskya banatica)
- Udzungwa noble grasshopper (Eupropacris uniformis)
- Eximacris superbum
- Three-spotted forest grasshopper (Heteracris trimaculata)
- Reatine Italian grasshopper (Italohippus modestus)
- Kilimanjaro drumming grasshopper (Ixalidium sjostedti)
- Usambara drumming grasshopper (Ixalidium transiens)
- Long-winged mountain grasshopper (Miramella irena)
- Romanian mountain grasshopper (Odontopodisma montana)
- Red-legged mountain grasshopper (Odontopodisma rubripes)
- Erimanthos [sic?] Mountain grasshopper (Oropodisma erymanthosi)
- Kyllini Mountain grasshopper (Oropodisma kyllinii)
- Macedonian mountain grasshopper (Oropodisma macedonica)
- Tayetos Mountain grasshopper (Oropodisma taygetosi)
- Turkish Black Sea Coast grasshopper (Rammeihippus turcicus)
- Almeria sand grasshopper (Sphingonotus almeriense)
- Tenerife sand grasshopper (Sphingonotus picteti)
- Rugose sand grasshopper (Sphingonotus rugosus)
- Eurasian toothed grasshopper (Stenobothrus eurasius)

===== Stenopelmatids =====
- Kelso Jerusalem cricket (Ammopelmatus kelsoensis)
- Port Conception Jerusalem cricket (Ammopelmatus muwu)
- Poor Knights weta (Deinacrida fallai)
- Wetapunga (Deinacrida heteracantha)
- Stephens Island weta (Deinacrida rugosa)
- Coachella Valley Jerusalem cricket (Stenopelmatus cahuilaensis)
- Navajo Jerusalem cricket (Stenopelmatus navajo)

===== Tettigoniids =====
- Richtersveld katydid (Africariola longicauda)
- Marakele delicate katydid (Amyttacta marakelensis)
- Short-winged tonged bush-cricket (Anadrymadusa brevipennis)
- Dilated false shieldback (Aroegas dilatatus)
- Flat-necked shieldback (Arytropteris basalis)
- Austrosaga spinifer
- Sierra Nevadan saddle bush-cricket (Baetica ustulata)
- Nihoa conehead katydid (Banza nihoa)
- Big Pine Key conehead katydid (Belocephalus micanopy)
- Keys short-winged conehead katydid (Belocephalus sleighti)
- Tenerife green bush-cricket (Calliphona koenigi)
- Canarian laurel bush-cricket (Canariola nubigena)
- Lalande's black-winged clonia (Clonia lalandei)
- Uvarov's clonia (Clonia uvarovi)
- Peringuey's meadow katydid (Conocephalus peringueyi)
- Zlobin's meadow katydid (Conocephalus zlobini)
- Remote conehead katydid (Euconocephalus remotus)
- Annamaria's marbled bush-cricket (Eupholidoptera annamariae)
- Cretan marbled bush-cricket (Eupholidoptera cretica)
- Idi marbled bush-cricket (Eupholidoptera forcipata)
- Skaronero marbled bush-cricket (Eupholidoptera gemellata)
- Giulia's marbled bush-cricket (Eupholidoptera giuliae)
- Ikaria marbled bush-cricket (Eupholidoptera icariensis)
- Jacqueline's marbled bush-cricket (Eupholidoptera jacquelinae)
- Hidden marbled bush-cricket (Eupholidoptera latens)
- Lefkas marbled bush-cricket (Eupholidoptera leucasi)
- Marianne's marbled bush-cricket (Eupholidoptera mariannae)
- Pale-legged marbled bush-cricket (Eupholidoptera pallipes)
- Hemisaga lucifer
- Hemisaga vepreculae
- Metrioptera domogledi
- Southern barbed-wire bush-cricket (Onconotus servillei)
- Pachysaga munggai
- Drakensberg grass false shieldback (Paracilacris lateralis)
- Golden Gate grass false shieldback (Paracilacris mordax)
- Vardousia Greek bush-cricket (Parnassiana coracis)
- Dirphys Greek bush-cricket (Parnassiana dirphys)
- Tawny Greek bush-cricket (Parnassiana fusca)
- Parnon Greek bush-cricket (Parnassiana parnon)
- Slim Greek bush-cricket (Parnassiana tenuis)
- Phasmodes jeeba
- Psacadonotus seriatus
- Gavrogo bush-cricket (Rhacocleis crypta)
- Cretan bush-cricket (Rhacocleis derrai)
- Lesbos bush-cricket (Rhacocleis distinguenda)
- Ferdinand's bush-cricket (Rhacocleis ferdinandi)
- Stone-jumping bush-cricket (Rhacocleis lithoscirtetes)
- Common predatory bush-cricket (Saga pedo)
- Golden Gate seedpod shieldback (Thoracistus aureoportalis)
- Green-kneed seedpod shieldback (Thoracistus viridicrus)
- Windbalea viride
- Zaprochilus ninae

===== Rhaphidophorids =====
- Arizona giant sand treader cricket (Daihinibaenetes arizonensis)
- Kalymnos cave-cricket (Dolichopoda calidnae)
- Cassagnau's cave-cricket (Dolichopoda cassagnaui)
- Kefalari cave-cricket (Dolichopoda dalensi)
- Lefkas cave-cricket (Dolichopoda gasparoi)
- Giuliana's cave-cricket (Dolichopoda giulianae)
- Perama cave-cricket (Dolichopoda graeca)
- Ithaka cave-cricket (Dolichopoda ithakii)
- Kalithea cave-cricket (Dolichopoda kalithea)
- Matsakis' cave-cricket (Dolichopoda matsakisi)
- Naxos cave-cricket (Dolichopoda naxia)
- Cephalonia cave-cricket (Dolichopoda pavesii)
- Pan cave-cricket (Dolichopoda petrochilosi)
- Thassos cave-cricket (Dolichopoda thasosensis)
- Kelso giant sand treader cricket (Macrobaenetes kelsoensis)
- Coachelia giant sand treader cricket (Macrobaenetes valgum)
- Pristoceuthophilus sp. nov.
- Tasmanoplectron isolatum
- Tanner's black camel cricket (Utabaenetes tanneri)

===== Phaneropterids =====
- Mute winter katydid (Brinckiella aptera)
- Karoo winter katydid (Brinckiella karooensis)
- Mauerberger's winter katydid (Brinckiella mauerbergerorum)
- Cozia plump bush-cricket (Isophya harzi)
- Long-tailed plump bush-cricket (Isophya longicaudata)
- Athos bright bush-cricket (Poecilimon athos)
- Ikaria bright bush-cricket (Poecilimon ikariensis)
- Istanbul bright bush-cricket (Poecilimon istanbul)
- Kadiytsa bright bush-cricket (Poecilimon pechevi)
- Short-tailed bull bush-cricket (Polysarcus scutatus)
- East Coast katydid (Pomatonota dregii)

===== Other Orthoptera species =====
- Canarian tiny cricket (Cycloptiloides canariensis)
- Keys scaly cricket (Cycloptilum irregularis)
- Pinaleno monkey grasshopper (Eumorsea pinaleno)
- Cretan stone grasshopper (Orchamus raulinii)
- Desert monkey grasshopper (Psychomastax deserticola)
- Sierra pygmy grasshopper (Tetrix sierrana)
- Uvarovitettix transsylvanicus

==== Hymenoptera ====
There are 155 species in the order Hymenoptera assessed as vulnerable.

===== Ants =====
- Acanthomyops latipes
- Acanthomyops murphii
- Anergates atratulus
- Anoplolepis nuptialis
- Antichthonidris bidentatus
- Camponotus universitatis
- Cardiocondyla zoserka
- Cataglyphis hannae
- Chalepoxenus brunneus
- Chalepoxenus kutteri
- Chalepoxenus muellerianus
- Chalepoxenus spinosus
- Chalepoxenus tarbinskii
- Chalepoxenus tauricus
- Chalepoxenus tramieri
- Chalepoxenus zabelini
- Crematogaster atilanica
- Crematogaster pilosa
- Doronomyrmex goesswaldi
- Doronomyrmex kutteri
- Doronomyrmex pacis
- Doronomyrmex pocahontas
- Dorymyrmex insanus
- Epimyrma adlerzi
- Epimyrma africana
- Epimyrma algeriana
- Epimyrma bernardi
- Epimyrma corsica
- Epimyrma goridaghini
- Epimyrma kraussei
- Ravoux's slavemaker ant (Epimyrma ravouxi)
- Epimyrma stumperi
- Epimyrma tamarae
- Epimyrma zaleskyi
- Formica dirksi
- Formica talbotae
- Formicoxenus chamberlini
- Formicoxenus nitidulus
- Formicoxenus provancheri
- Formicoxenus quebecensis
- Formicoxenus sibiricus
- Harpagoxenus canadensis
- Harpagoxenus sublaevis
- Harpagoxenus zaisanicus
- Kyidris media
- Kyidris yaleogyna
- Lasius reginae
- Leptothorax buschingeri
- Leptothorax duloticus
- Leptothorax faberi
- Leptothorax minutissimus
- Manica parasitica
- Megalomyrmex symmetochus
- Monomorium effractor
- Monomorium hospitum
- Monomorium inquilinum
- Monomorium noualhieri
- Monomorium pergandei
- Monomorium santschii
- Monomorium talbotae
- Myrmecia inquilina
- Myrmica bibikoffi
- Myrmica colax
- Myrmica ereptrix
- Myrmica faniensis
- Myrmica hirsuta
- Myrmica kabylica
- Myrmica lampra
- Myrmica laurae
- Myrmica lemasnei
- Myrmica myrmicoxena
- Myrmica quebecensis
- Myrmica samnitica
- Myrmica symbiotica
- Myrmica winterae
- Myrmoxenus gordiagini
- Oxyepoecus bruchi
- Oxyepoecus daguerrei
- Oxyepoecus inquilinus
- Pheidole acutidens
- Pheidole argentina
- Pheidole elecebra
- Pheidole inquilina
- Pheidole lanuginosa
- Pheidole microgyna
- Pheidole neokohli
- Pheidole oculata
- Pheidole parasitica
- Pheidole symbiotica
- Plagiolepis ampeloni
- Plagiolepis grassei
- Plagiolepis regis
- Pogonomyrmex anergismus
- Pogonomyrmex colei
- Polyergus breviceps
- Polyergus lucidus
- Polyergus nigerrimus
- Polyergus samurai
- Protomognathus americanus
- Pseudoatta argentina
- Pseudomyrmex leptosus
- Rhoptromyrmex mayri
- Rhoptromyrmex schmitzi
- Rossomyrmex minuchae
- Rossomyrmex proformicarum
- Serrastruma inquilina
- Solenopsis daguerrei
- Solenopsis solenopsidis
- Strongylognathus afer
- Strongylognathus alboini
- Strongylognathus alpinus
- Strongylognathus arnoldii
- Strongylognathus caeciliae
- Strongylognathus cecconii
- Strongylognathus chelifer
- Strongylognathus christophi
- Strongylognathus dalmaticus
- Strongylognathus destefanii
- Strongylognathus emeryi
- Strongylognathus foreli
- Strongylognathus huberi
- Strongylognathus insularis
- Strongylognathus italicus
- Strongylognathus karawajewi (Strongylognathus karawajevi)
- Strongylognathus kervillei
- Strongylognathus koreanus
- Strongylognathus kratochvili (Strongylognathus kratochvilli)
- Strongylognathus minutus
- Strongylognathus palaestinensis
- Strongylognathus pisarskii
- Strongylognathus rehbinderi
- Strongylognathus ruzskyi
- Strongylognathus silvestrii
- Strumigenys xenos
- Teleutomyrmex kutteri
- Teleutomyrmex schneideri
- Tetramorium microgyna
- Tetramorium parasiticum

===== Colletids =====
- Colletes dimidiatus
- Colletes moricei
- Colletes pulchellus

===== Melittids =====
- Melitta hispanica
- Melitta kastiliensis

===== Apids =====
- Bombus alpinus
- Obscure bumble bee (Bombus caliginosus)
- Yellow bumblebee (Bombus fervidus)
- Bombus medius
- Bombus mexicanus
- Morrison bumble bee (Bombus morrisoni)
- Western bumblebee (Bombus occidentalis)
- American bumblebee (Bombus pensylvanicus)
- Yellow-banded bumblebee (Bombus terricola)
- Nomada noskiewiczi

===== Megachilids =====
- Wallace's giant bee (Megachile pluto)

==== Mantises ====
- Delicate dwarf mantis (Ameles gracilis)
- Fringed dwarf mantis (Ameles limbata)
- Short-winged dwarf mantis (Pseudoyersinia subaptera)

==== Lepidoptera ====
Lepidoptera comprises moths and butterflies. There are 128 species and ten subspecies in the order Lepidoptera assessed as vulnerable.

===== Lasiocampids =====
- Small lappet moth (Phyllodesma ilicifolia)

===== Swallowtail butterflies =====
- Atrophaneura atropos
- Atrophaneura luchti
- Atrophaneura schadenbergi
- Zetides swallowtail (Battus zetides)
- Ludlow's Bhutan swallowtail (Bhutanitis ludlowi)
- Yellow kite swallowtail (Eurytides iphitas)
- Andamans swordtail (Graphium epaminondas)
- Graphium idaeoides
- Meek's graphium (Graphium meeki)
- Graphium megaera
- Graphium procles
- Graphium stresemanni
- Obi Island birdwing (Ornithoptera aesacus)
- Rothschild's birdwing (Ornithoptera rothschildi)
- Papilio carolinensis
- Papilio esperanza
- Jordan's swallowtail (Papilio jordani)
- Cream-banded swallowtail (Papilio leucotaenia)
- Papilio mangoura
- Papilio neumoegeni
- Papilio osmana
- Papillon la pature (Papilio phorbanta)
- Fluminense swallowtail (Parides ascanius)
- Apollo (Parnassius apollo)
- Parnassius autocrator
- Jamaican kite (Protographium marcellinus)
- Talaud black birdwing (Troides dohertyi)
- Buru opalescent birdwing (Troides prattorum)
- Caucasian festoon (Zerynthia caucasica)

===== Lycaenids =====
- Alaena margaritacea
- Aloeides caledoni
- Aloeides carolynnae
- Aloeides dentatis
- Aloeides kaplani
- Aloeides lutescens
- Aloeides merces
- Aloeides pringlei
- Aloeides rossouwi
- Aslauga australis
- Capys penningtoni
- Cyanophrys bertha
- Erikssonia acraeina
- White spotted sapphire (Iolaus lulua)
- Lepidochrysops balli
- Lepidochrysops jefferyi
- Lepidochrysops littoralis
- Lepidochrysops loewensteini
- Lepidochrysops oosthuizeni
- Lepidochrysops outeniqua
- Lepidochrysops pephredo
- Lepidochrysops poseidon
- Lepidochrysops pringlei
- Lepidochrysops swanepoeli
- Lepidochrysops titei
- Lepidochrysops victori
- Lepidochrysops wykehami
- Tiassale liptena (Liptena tiassale)
- Hermes copper (Lycaena hermes)
- Grecian copper (Lycaena ottomana)
- Orachrysops ariadne
- Phasis pringlei
- Poecilmitis adonis
- Azure opal (Poecilmitis azurius)
- Poecilmitis balli
- Poecilmitis daphne
- Poecilmitis endymion
- Poecilmitis henningi
- Poecilmitis hyperion
- Poecilmitis irene
- Poecilmitis kaplani
- Tsomo River copper (Poecilmitis lyncurium)
- Poecilmitis lyndseyae
- Poecilmitis orientalis
- Poecilmitis penningtoni
- Poecilmitis pyramus
- Poecilmitis stepheni
- Poecilmitis trimeni
- Poecilmitis wykehami
- Higgin's anomalous blue (Polyommatus galloi)
- Sierra Nevada blue (Polyommatus golgus)
- Ipharcamon blue (Polyommatus iphicarmon)
- Lycian blue (Polyommatus lycius)
- Polyommatus orphicus
- Sinai hairstreak (Satyrium jebelia)
- Avalon hairstreak (Strymon avalona)
- Thestor compassbergae
- Thestor dryburghi
- Kaplan's thestor (Thestor kaplani)
- Thestor pringlei
- Thestor rossouwi
- Thestor stepheni
- Thestor strutti
- Thestor swanepoeli
- Thestor tempe
- Thestor yildizae

===== Nymphalids =====
Species

- Madagascan friar (Amauris nossima)
- Mauritian friar (Amauris phoedon)
- Uncompahgre fritillary (Boloria acrocnema)
- Balkan heath (Coenonympha orientalis)
- Raetzer's ringlet (Erebia christi)
- Sudeten ringlet (Erebia sudetica)
- Andaman crow (Euploea andamanensis)
- Cordelia's crow (Euploea cordelia)
- Mascarene crow (Euploea euphon)
- Spartan crow (Euploea lacon)
- Magou (Euploea magou)
- Nicobar crow (Euploea scherzeri)
- El Hierro grayling (Hipparchia bacchus)
- La Palma grayling (Hipparchia tilosi)
- Electra's tree-nymph (Idea electra)
- Bedford-Russell's tree-nymph (Idea tambusisiana)
- Ideopsis oberthurii
- New Ireland yellow tiger (Parantica clinias)
- D'Abrera's tiger (Parantica dabrerai)
- Dannatt's tiger (Parantica dannatti)
- Angled tiger (Parantica garamantis)
- Sumbawa tiger (Parantica philo)
- Felder's tiger (Parantica phyle)
- Toxopeus' yellow tiger (Parantica toxopei)
- Flores tiger (Parantica wegneri)
- Dils' grayling (Pseudochazara orestes)
- Crow tiger (Tirumala euploeomorpha)

Subspecies

- Danaus affinis jimiensis
- Danaus melanippus keteus
- Outcast crow (Euploea algea abjecta)
- Euploea algea eleutho
- Euploea algea schmeltzi
- Euploea crameri albomaculata
- Euploea mulciber elwesii
- Euploea radamanthus schreiberi
- Parantica weiskei thalassina
- Sarangani tiger (Tirumala choaspes tumanana)

===== Skippers =====
- Dakota skipper (Hesperia dacotae)
- Cinquefoil skipper (Pyrgus cirsii)

===== Pierids =====
- Canary brimstone (Gonepteryx cleobule)
- Atewa dotted border (Mylothris atewa)
- Moroccan green-veined white (Pieris segonzaci)

==== Beetles ====
There are 50 beetle species assessed as vulnerable.

===== Dytiscids =====
- Acilius duvergeri
- Deronectes depressicollis
- Deronectes ferrugineus
- Dytiscus latissimus
- Graphoderus bilineatus
- Meladema lanio

===== Longhorn beetles =====
- Cerambyx longicorn (Cerambyx cerdo)
- Clytus clavicornis
- Clytus triangulimacula
- Delagrangeus schurmanni
- Isotomus barbarae
- Macrodontia cervicornis
- Morimus funereus
- Rosalia longicorn (Rosalia alpina)

===== Scarabaeids =====
- Ciervo scarab beetle (Aegialia concinna)
- Crescent dune scarab beetle (Aegialia crescenta)
- Ateuchetus semipunctatus
- Ateuchus squalidus
- Aulacopris matthewsi
- Canthon corpulentus
- Canthon quadripunctatus
- Clypeodrepanus striatus
- Ontherus hadros
- Onthophagus albarracinus
- Pachysoma aesculapius
- Pachysoma endroedyi
- Pachysoma glentoni
- Pedaridium hirsutum
- Platyonitis bicuariensis
- Giuliani's dune scarab beetle (Pseudocotalpa giulianii)

===== Other beetle species =====
- Ampedus brunnicornis
- Ampedus hjorti
- Anonyxmolytes lilliput
- Carabus olympiae
- Cobblestone tiger beetle (Cicindela marginipennis)
- Globose dune beetle (Coelus globosus)
- San Joaquin dune beetle (Coelus gracilis)
- Colophon cameroni
- Colophon neli
- Colophon stokoei
- Colophon westwoodi
- Blind cave beetle (Glacicavicola bathysciodes)
- Gnorimus decempunctatus
- Leipaspis lauricola
- Melasis fermini
- Microblattellus lecongmani
- Frigate Island giant tenebrionid beetle (Polposipus herculeanus)
- Gammon's riffle beetle (Stenelmis gammoni)
- Thorectes valencianus
- Triplax emgei

==== Odonata ====
Odonata includes dragonflies and damselflies. There are 129 species and five subspecies in the order Odonata assessed as vulnerable.

===== Chlorogomphids =====
- Chlorogomphus brevistigma
- Chlorogomphus gracilis
- Chlorogomphus nakamurai
- Chlorogomphus xanthoptera
- Chloropetalia selysi
- Watanabeopetalia uenoi

===== Chlorocyphids =====
- Banded jewel (Africocypha centripunctata)
- Kaleidoscope jewel (Africocypha lacuselephantum)
- Albertine jewel (Chlorocypha schmidti)
- Libellago andamanensis
- Tanzania jewel (Platycypha auripes)
- Rhinocypha dorsosanguinea
- Rhinocypha latimacula
- Mahale jewel (Stenocypha hasta)

===== Platycnemidids =====
- Calicnemia nipalica
- Coeliccia exoleta
- Coeliccia flavostriata
- Coeliccia fraseri
- Disparoneura apicalis
- Yellow-fronted threadtail (Elattoneura dorsalis)
- Elattoneura pasquinii
- Lieftinckia lairdi
- Nososticta phoenissa
- Nososticta plagioxantha
- Risiocnemis pulchra
- Ceres stream-damsel (Spesbona angusta)

===== Megapodagrionids =====
- Heteragrion flavovittatum
- Cuban hypolestes (Hypolestes trinitatis)
- Zoe waterfall damsel (Paraphlebia zoe)
- Philogenia cristalina
- Philosina alba
- Little wood elf (Sciotropis cyclanthorum)
- Teinopodagrion temporale

===== Gomphids =====
Species

- Top end dragon (Antipodogomphus dentosus)
- Cape thorntail (Ceratogomphus triceraticus)
- Crenigomphus abyssinicus
- Crenigomphus denticulatus
- Cyclogomphus gynostylus
- Gomphus lucasii
- Tennessee clubtail (Gomphus sandrius)
- Westfall's clubtail (Gomphus westfalli)
- Kakadu vicetail (Hemigomphus magela)
- Lamelligomphus tutulus
- Macrogomphus lankanensis
- Nepogomphoides stuhlmanni
- Dark pincertail (Onychogomphus assimilis)
- Waved pincertail (Onychogomphus flexuosus)
- Levant pincertail (Onychogomphus macrodon)
- Paragomphus tachyerges
- Pegtail (Perigomphus pallidistylus)
- Phyllogomphoides joaquini
- Yellow-sided clubtail (Stylurus potulentus)
- Townes's clubtail (Stylurus townesi)

Subspecies

- Erpetogomphus lampropeltis lampropeltis

===== Coenagrionids =====
Species

- Chimanimani bluet (Africallagma cuneistigma)
- Liberian wisp (Agriocnemis angustirami)
- Antiagrion blanchardi
- Sabino dancer (Argia sabino)
- Yellow waxtail (Ceriagrion citrinum)
- Turkish red damsel (Ceriagrion georgifreyi)
- Cretan bluet (Coenagrion intermedium)
- East Coast giant (Coryphagrion grandis)
- Cuban bluet (Enallagma truncatum)
- Ethiopian bluetail (Ischnura abyssinica)
- San Francisco forktail (Ischnura gemina)
- Ischnura pamelae
- Mecistogaster asticta
- Oahu damselfly (Megalagrion oahuense)
- Oceanic Hawaiian damselfly (Megalagrion oceanicum)
- Pacific Hawaiian damselfly (Megalagrion pacificum)
- Orangeblack Hawaiian damselfly (Megalagrion xanthomelas)
- Mesamphiagrion ovigerum
- Mesamphiagrion rosseri
- Pericnemis triangularis
- Pseudagrion bicoerulans
- Pseudagrion guichardi
- Pseudagrion kaffinum
- Harlequin sprite (Pseudagrion newtoni)
- Pseudagrion pontogenes
- Vumba sprite (Pseudagrion vumbaense)
- Indian Ocean fineliner (Teinobasis alluaudi)
- Telebasis farcimentum

Subspecies

- Somalian bluet (Azuragrion somalicum amitinum)
- Frey's damselfly (Coenagrion hylas freyi)
- Blackline damselfly (Megalagrion nigrohamatum nigrolineatum)
- Pseudagrion sublacteum mortoni

===== Aeshnids =====
- Thylacine darner (Acanthaeschna victoria)
- Gynacantha bispina
- Gynacantha constricta
- Petaliaeschna flavipes
- Yemen hawker (Pinheyschna yemenensis)
- Planaeschna celia
- Sarasaeschna niisatoi

===== Libellulids =====
- Atoconeura aethiopica
- Bironides teuchestes
- Dark-winged groundling (Brachythemis fuscopalliata)
- Diplacina arsinoe
- Purple skimmer (Libellula jesseana)
- Micrathyria divergens
- Micrathyria pseudhypodidyma
- Mangrove skimmer (Orthetrum poecilops)
- Sympetrum gracile
- Tetrathemis yerburii
- Urothemis abbotti

===== Other Odonata species =====
- Argiolestes realensis
- Bayadera hyalina
- Elegant malachite (Chlorolestes elegans)
- Cora lugubris
- Say's spiketail (Cordulegaster sayi)
- Drepanosticta centrosaurus
- Marbled malachite (Ecchlorolestes peringueyi)
- Euphaea basalis
- Euphaea pahyapi
- Guatemalan rubyspot (Hetaerina rudis)
- Saffron reedtail (Indosticta deccanensis)
- Rock narrow-wing (Lithosticta macra)
- Macromia erato
- Macromia irina
- Macromia katae
- Splendid cruiser (Macromia splendens)
- Metaphya elongata
- African twigtail (Nubiolestes diotima)
- Red relic (Pentaphlebia stahli)
- Peaked redspot (Phyllopetalia excrescens)
- Protosticta khaosoidaoensis
- Red spot reedtail (Protosticta sanguinostigma)
- Bulgarian emerald (Somatochlora borisi)
- Texas emerald (Somatochlora margarita)
- Yellow presba (Syncordulia gracilis)
- Mahogany presba (Syncordulia venator)
- Synthemis alecto
- Green-banded sparklewing (Umma declivium)
- Angola sparklewing (Umma femina)
- Purple sparklewing (Umma purpurea)
- Ringed boghaunter (Williamsonia lintneri)

=== Other arthropod species ===
- Acrocyrtus sp. nov. 'HC - blind'
- Folsomides sp. nov. 'HC - blind'
- Atlantic horseshoe crab (Limulus polyphemus)
- Serpent Island centipede (Scolopendra abnormis)

== Echinoderms ==
- Brownfish (Actinopyga echinites)
- Surf redfish (Actinopyga mauritiana)
- Harry blackfish (Actinopyga miliaris)
- Warty sea cucumber (Apostichopus parvimensis)
- Bohadschia maculisparsa
- Holothuria arenacava
- White teatfish (Holothuria fuscogilva)
- Holothuria platei
- Herrmann's sea cucumber (Stichopus herrmanni)

== See also ==
- Lists of IUCN Red List vulnerable species
- List of least concern invertebrates
- List of near threatened invertebrates
- List of endangered invertebrates
- List of critically endangered invertebrates
- List of recently extinct invertebrates
- List of data deficient invertebrates
- Cernuellopsis
