= S. minutus =

S. minutus may refer to:

- Sorex minutus, the Eurasian pygmy shrew or pygmy shrew, a widespread mammal species of northern Eurasia
- Strongylognathus minutus, an insect species endemic to Turkmenistan

== See also ==
- List of Latin and Greek words commonly used in systematic names § M
