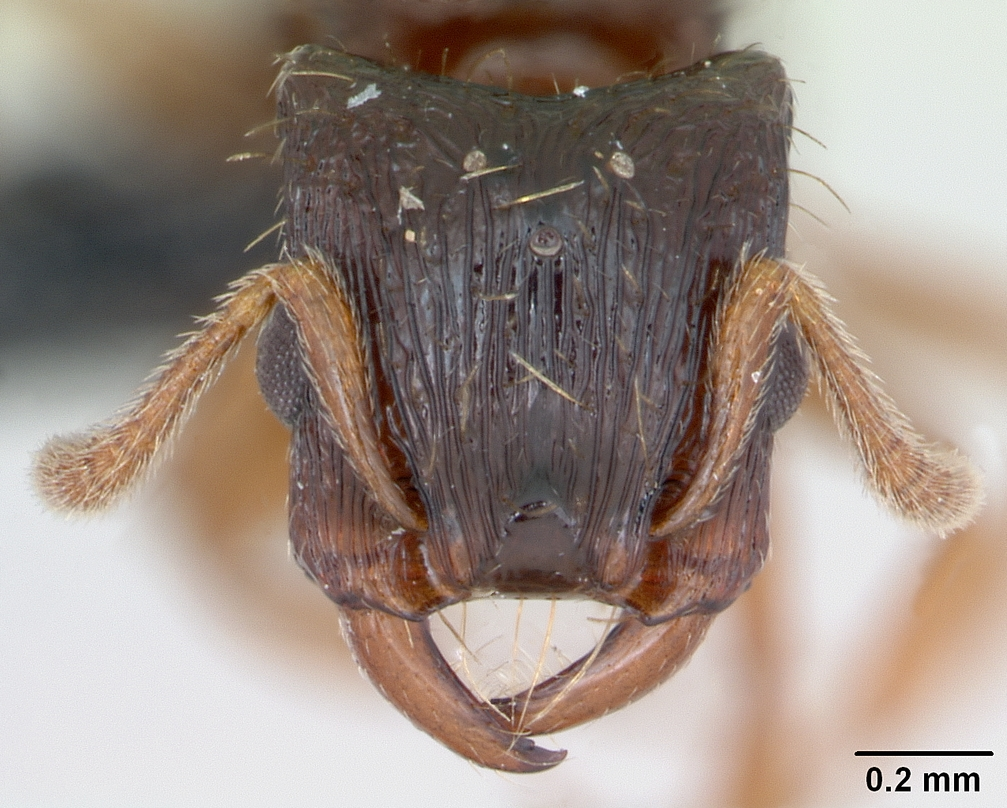

Scientific classification
- Domain: Eukaryota
- Kingdom: Animalia
- Phylum: Arthropoda
- Class: Insecta
- Order: Hymenoptera
- Family: Formicidae
- Subfamily: Myrmicinae
- Genus: Strongylognathus
- Species: S. testaceus

Binomial name
- Strongylognathus testaceus Schenck, 1852

= Strongylognathus testaceus =

Species of ant

Strongylognathus testaceus is a species of slave-making ant in the subfamily Myrmicinae. The species is known from Europe and the Caucasus.

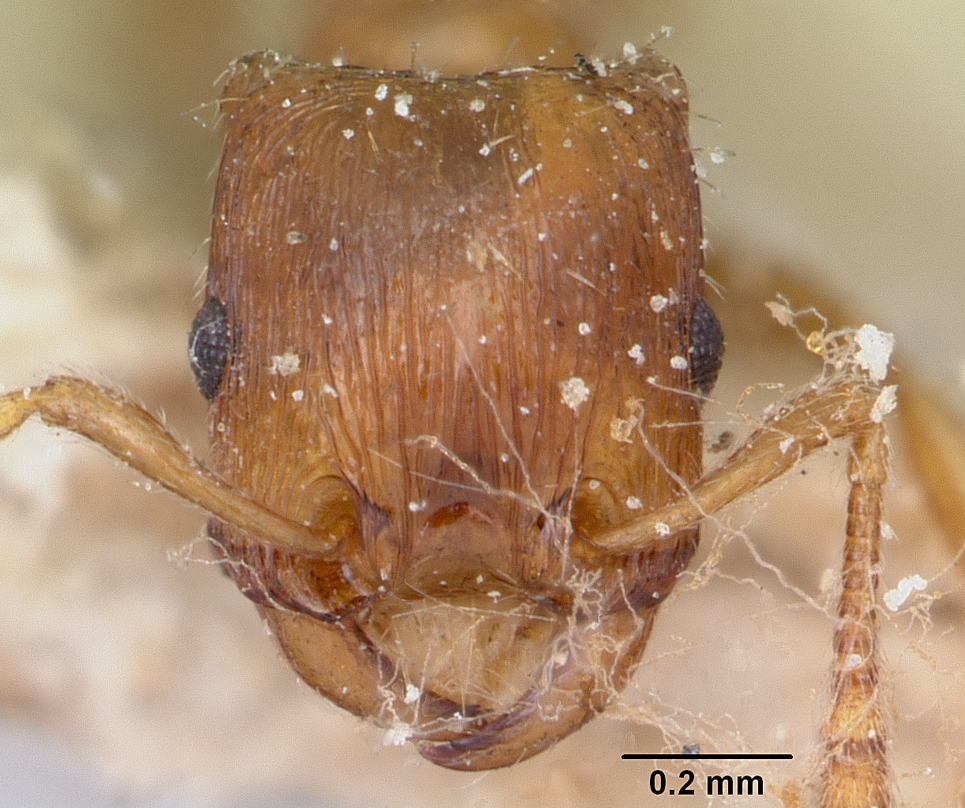

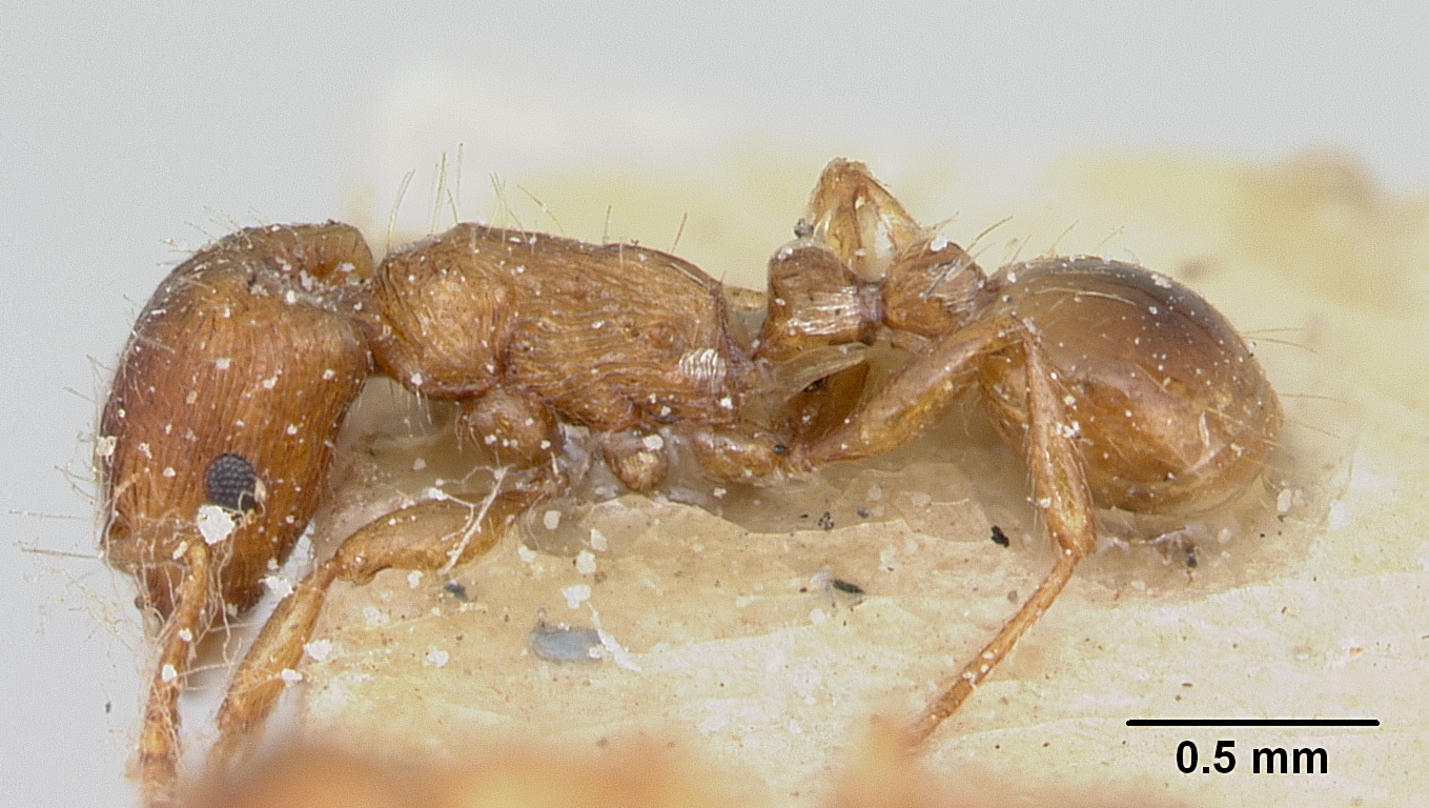
