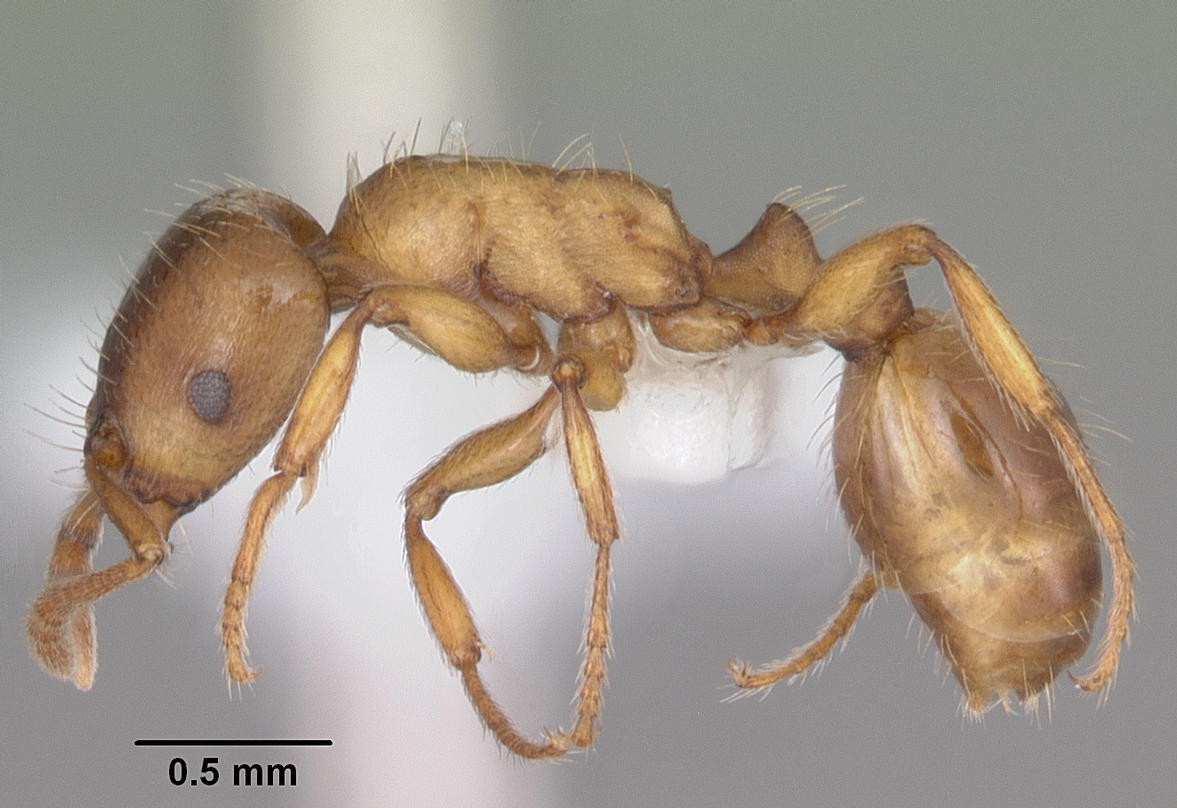
- Strongylognathus caeciliae worker

Scientific classification
- Domain: Eukaryota
- Kingdom: Animalia
- Phylum: Arthropoda
- Class: Insecta
- Order: Hymenoptera
- Family: Formicidae
- Subfamily: Myrmicinae
- Tribe: Crematogastrini
- Genus: Strongylognathus; Mayr, 1853

Type species
- Eciton testaceum

Diversity
- 25 species

Synonyms
- Myrmus Schenck, 1853

= Strongylognathus =

Genus of ants

Strongylognathus is a genus of ants in the subfamily Myrmicinae. Many of its species are endemic to specific regions.

== Species ==
- Strongylognathus afer Emery, 1884
- Strongylognathus alboini Finzi, 1924
- Strongylognathus alpinus Wheeler, 1909
- Strongylognathus arnoldii Radchenko, 1985
- Strongylognathus caeciliae Forel, 1897
- Strongylognathus chelifer Radchenko, 1985
- Strongylognathus christophi Emery, 1889
- Strongylognathus dalmaticus Baroni Urbani, 1969
- Strongylognathus destefanii Emery, 1915
- Strongylognathus huberi Forel, 1874
- Strongylognathus insularis Baroni Urbani, 1968
- Strongylognathus italicus Finzi, 1924
- Strongylognathus kabakovi Radchenko & Dubovikov, 2011
- Strongylognathus karawajewi Pisarski, 1966
- Strongylognathus kervillei Santschi, 1921
- Strongylognathus koreanus Pisarski, 1966
- Strongylognathus kratochvili Silhavy, 1937
- Strongylognathus minutus Radchenko, 1991
- Strongylognathus palaestinensis Menozzi, 1933
- Strongylognathus pisarskii Poldi, 1994
- Strongylognathus potanini Radchenko, 1995
- Strongylognathus rehbinderi Forel, 1904
- Strongylognathus silvestrii Menozzi, 1936
- Strongylognathus testaceus (Schenck, 1852)
- Strongylognathus tylonus Wei, Xu & He, 2001
