= Strongylognathus karawajewi =

Conservation status
- Vulnerable (IUCN 2.3)

Scientific classification
- Kingdom: Animalia
- Phylum: Arthropoda
- Class: Insecta
- Order: Hymenoptera
- Family: Formicidae
- Subfamily: Myrmicinae
- Genus: Strongylognathus
- Species: S. karawajewi

Binomial name
- Strongylognathus karawajewi Pisarski, 1966

Species of ant

Strongylognathus karawajewi is a species of ant in the genus Strongylognathus. It is endemic to Ukraine.
