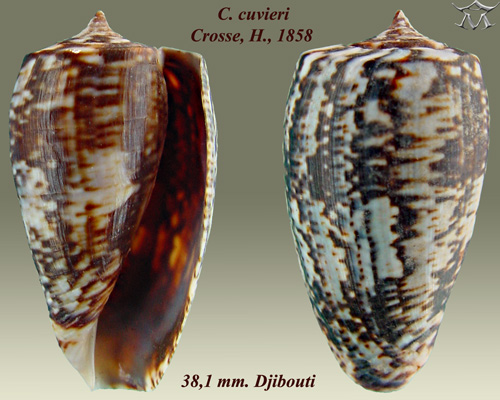
- Apertural and abapertural views of shell of Conus cuvieri Crosse, H., 1858
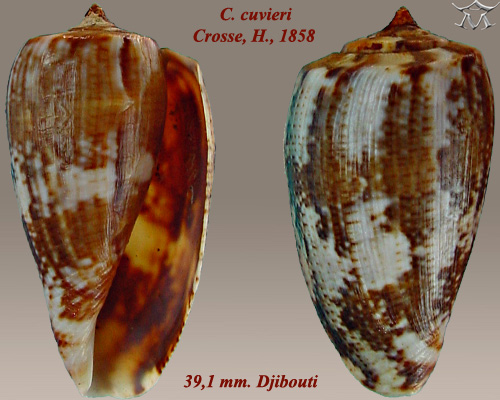

Conservation status
- Vulnerable (IUCN 3.1)

Scientific classification
- Kingdom: Animalia
- Phylum: Mollusca
- Class: Gastropoda
- Subclass: Caenogastropoda
- Order: Neogastropoda
- Superfamily: Conoidea
- Family: Conidae
- Genus: Conus
- Species: C. cuvieri

Binomial name
- Conus cuvieri Crosse, 1858

Synonyms
- Conus (Gastridium) cuvieri Crosse, 1858 · accepted, alternate representation; Conus cervus sensu G. B. Sowerby I, 1838 (misidentification); Conus deshayesii Reeve, 1843 (invalid: junior homonym of Conus deshaysesii Bellardi & Michelotti, 1841; C. exdeshayesi is a replacement name); Conus exdeshayesi Sacco, 1893; Chelyconus exdeshayesii Sacco, F., 1893; Gastridium cuvieri (Crosse, 1858)

= Conus cuvieri =

Species of sea snail

Conus cuvieri, common name Cuvier's cone, is a species of sea snail, a marine gastropod mollusk in the family Conidae, the cone snails and their allies.

Like all species within the genus Conus, these snails are predatory and venomous. They are capable of stinging humans, therefore live ones should be handled carefully or not at all.

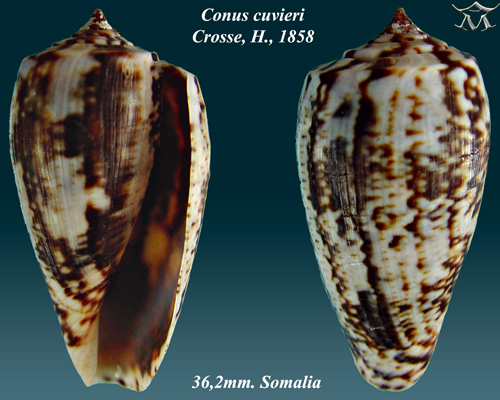
Conus cuvieri Crosse, H., 1858

== Description ==
The size of the shell varies between 17 mm and 51 mm. The thin shell is cylindrically inflated and, thin. It has a pale fawn color, with a few large white blotches, especially about the middle, and numerous close revolving lines of chestnut spots.

== Distribution ==
This marine species occurs in the southern part of the Red Sea and in the Gulf of Aden.
