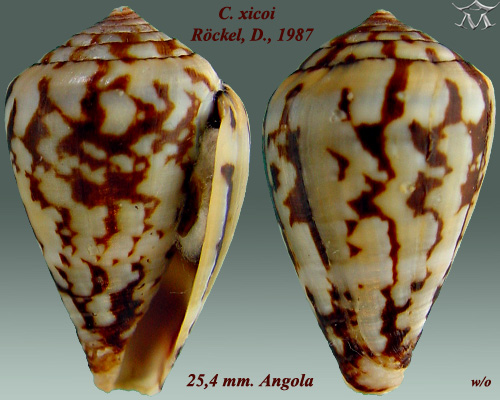
- Apertural and abapertural views of shell of Conus xicoi Röckel, D., 1987
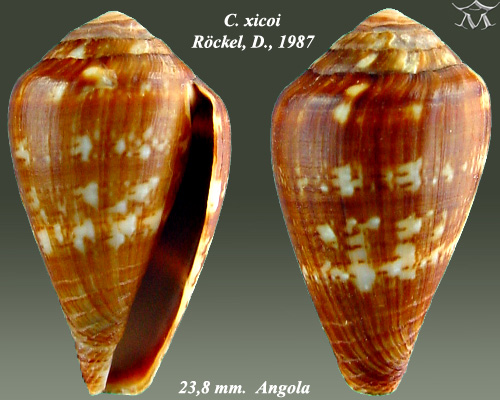

Conservation status
- Endangered (IUCN 3.1)

Scientific classification
- Kingdom: Animalia
- Phylum: Mollusca
- Class: Gastropoda
- Subclass: Caenogastropoda
- Order: Neogastropoda
- Superfamily: Conoidea
- Family: Conidae
- Genus: Conus
- Species: C. xicoi

Binomial name
- Conus xicoi Röckel, 1987

Synonyms
- Conus (Lautoconus) xicoi Röckel, 1987 · accepted, alternate representation; Varioconus xicoi (Röckel, 1987)

= Conus xicoi =

Species of sea snail

Conus xicoi is a species of sea snail, a marine gastropod mollusk in the family Conidae, the cone snails and their allies.

Like all species within the genus Conus, these snails are predatory and venomous. They are capable of stinging humans, therefore live ones should be handled carefully or not at all.

== Description ==
The size of the shell varies between 16 and 32 mm (0.63 and 1.26 in).

== Distribution ==
This species occurs in the Atlantic Ocean off Angola.
