= Conus immelmani =

Conservation status
- Vulnerable (IUCN 3.1)

Scientific classification
- Kingdom: Animalia
- Phylum: Mollusca
- Class: Gastropoda
- Subclass: Caenogastropoda
- Order: Neogastropoda
- Superfamily: Conoidea
- Family: Conidae
- Genus: Conus
- Species: C. immelmani

Binomial name
- Conus immelmani Korn, 1998

Synonyms
- Conus (Leptoconus) immelmani Korn, 1998 · accepted, alternate representation; Nataliconus immelmani (Korn, 1998)

Species of sea snail

Conus immelmani is a species of sea snail, a marine gastropod mollusk in the family Conidae, the cone snails and their allies.

Like all species within the genus Conus, these snails are predatory and venomous. They are capable of stinging humans, therefore live ones should be handled carefully or not at all.

== Description ==
The size of the shell varies between 71 mm and 90 mm.

== Distribution ==
This marine species occurs off KwaZulu-Natal and Eastern Cape Province, South Africa.
