= Shortspire hornsnail =

Conservation status
- Vulnerable (IUCN 2.3)

Scientific classification
- Kingdom: Animalia
- Phylum: Mollusca
- Class: Gastropoda
- Subclass: Caenogastropoda
- Family: Pleuroceridae
- Genus: Pleurocera
- Species: P. curta

Binomial name
- Pleurocera curta Haldeman, 1841

Species of gastropod

The shortspire hornsnail, scientific name Pleurocera curta, is a species of freshwater snail with an operculum, an aquatic gastropod mollusk in the family Pleuroceridae. This species is endemic to the United States.
