= Strongylognathus alboini =

Conservation status
- Vulnerable (IUCN 2.3)

Scientific classification
- Kingdom: Animalia
- Phylum: Arthropoda
- Class: Insecta
- Order: Hymenoptera
- Family: Formicidae
- Subfamily: Myrmicinae
- Genus: Strongylognathus
- Species: S. alboini

Binomial name
- Strongylognathus alboini (Finzi, 1924)

Species of ant

Strongylognathus alboini is a species of ant in the genus Strongylognathus. It is native to Italy.
