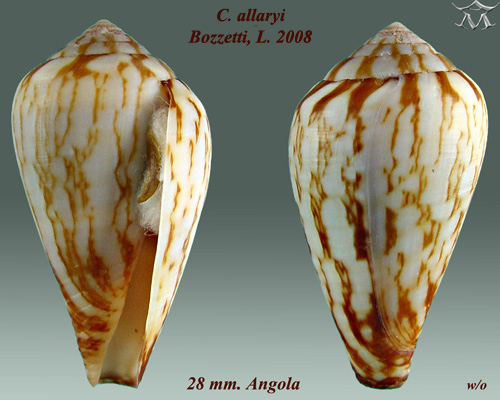
- Apertural and abapertural views of shell of Conus allaryi Bozzetti, L. 2008

Conservation status
- Vulnerable (IUCN 3.1)

Scientific classification
- Kingdom: Animalia
- Phylum: Mollusca
- Class: Gastropoda
- Subclass: Caenogastropoda
- Order: Neogastropoda
- Superfamily: Conoidea
- Family: Conidae
- Genus: Conus
- Species: C. allaryi

Binomial name
- Conus allaryi Bozzetti, 2008

Synonyms
- Conus (Lautoconus) allaryi Bozzetti, 2008 · accepted, alternate representation; Varioconus allaryi (Bozzetti, 2008)

= Conus allaryi =

Species of sea snail

Conus allaryi is a species of sea snail, a marine gastropod mollusk in the family Conidae, the cone snails and their allies.

Like all species within the genus Conus, these snails are predatory and venomous. They are capable of stinging humans, therefore live ones should be handled carefully or not at all.

== Description ==
The size of the shell varies between 23 mm and 26 mm.

== Distribution ==
This species occurs in the Atlantic Ocean off Angola.
