= Moreletina obruta =

Conservation status
- Vulnerable (IUCN 3.1)

Scientific classification
- Kingdom: Animalia
- Phylum: Mollusca
- Class: Gastropoda
- Order: Stylommatophora
- Family: Geomitridae
- Genus: Moreletina
- Species: M. obruta

Binomial name
- Moreletina obruta (Morelet, 1860)

Synonyms
- Helix obruta Morelet, 1860

Species of gastropod

Moreletina obruta is a species of large, edible, air-breathing land snail, a terrestrial pulmonate gastropod mollusc in the family Geomitridae. This species is endemic to Portugal.
