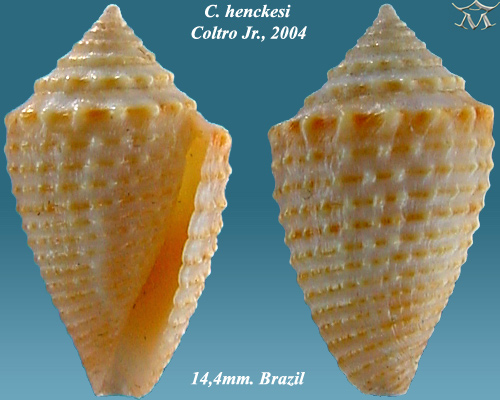
- Apertural and abapertural views of shell of Conasprella henckesi (Coltro Jr., 2004)
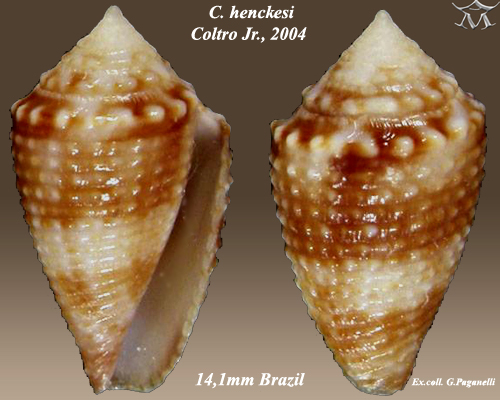

Scientific classification
- Domain: Eukaryota
- Kingdom: Animalia
- Phylum: Mollusca
- Class: Gastropoda
- Subclass: Caenogastropoda
- Order: Neogastropoda
- Superfamily: Conoidea
- Family: Conidae
- Genus: Conasprella
- Species: C. henckesi

Binomial name
- Conasprella henckesi (Coltro, 2004)

Synonyms
- Conasprella (Ximeniconus) henckesi (Coltro, 2004) · accepted, alternate representation; Conus henckesi Coltro, 2004 (original combination); Jaspidiconus henckesi (Coltro, 2004)

= Conasprella henckesi =

Species of gastropod

Conasprella henckesi is a species of sea snail, a marine gastropod mollusk in the family Conidae, the cone snails and their allies.

Like all species within the genus Conasprella, these snails are predatory and venomous. They are capable of stinging humans, therefore live ones should be handled carefully or not at all.

== Distribution ==
This species occurs in the Atlantic Ocean off Northeast Brazil.

== Description ==
The maximum recorded shell length is 17.3 mm.

== Habitat ==
Minimum recorded depth is 1 m. Maximum recorded depth is 2 m.
