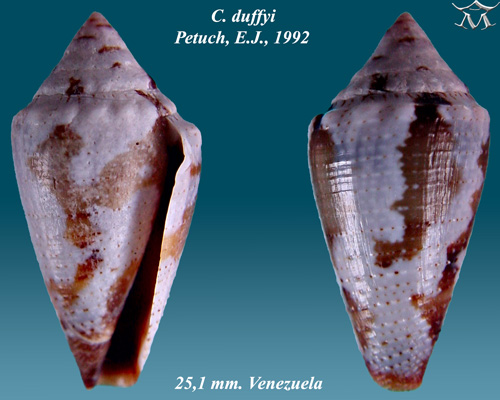
- Apertural and abapertural views of shell of Conus duffyi Petuch, E.J., 1992

Conservation status
- Least Concern (IUCN 3.1)

Scientific classification
- Kingdom: Animalia
- Phylum: Mollusca
- Class: Gastropoda
- Subclass: Caenogastropoda
- Order: Neogastropoda
- Superfamily: Conoidea
- Family: Conidae
- Genus: Conus
- Species: C. duffyi

Binomial name
- Conus duffyi Petuch, 1992

Synonyms
- Conus (Stephanoconus) duffyi Petuch, 1992 accepted, alternate representation; Protoconus duffyi (Petuch, 1992); Tenorioconus duffyi (Petuch, 1992)

= Conus duffyi =

Species of sea snail

Conus duffyi is a species of sea snail, a marine gastropod mollusk in the family Conidae, the cone snails and their allies.

Like all species within the genus Conus, these snails are predatory and venomous. They are capable of stinging humans, therefore live ones should be handled carefully or not at all.

== Distribution ==
This species occurs in the Caribbean Sea at Los Roques, Venezuela, and off the Dutch Antilles.

== Description ==
The maximum recorded shell length is 42 mm.

== Habitat ==
The average recorded depth of Conus duffyi is 2 meters.
