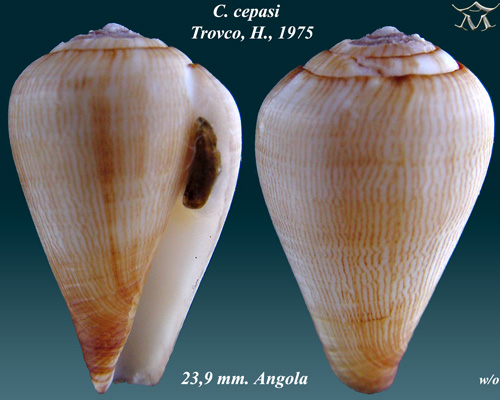

Conservation status
- Vulnerable (IUCN 3.1)

Scientific classification
- Kingdom: Animalia
- Phylum: Mollusca
- Class: Gastropoda
- Subclass: Caenogastropoda
- Order: Neogastropoda
- Superfamily: Conoidea
- Family: Conidae
- Genus: Conus
- Species: C. cepasi

Binomial name
- Conus cepasi Trovão, H., 1975

Synonyms
- Conus (Lautoconus) cepasi Trovão, 1975 · accepted, alternate representation; Varioconus cepasi Trovão, H., 1975

= Conus cepasi =

Species of sea snail

Conus cepasi is a species of predatory sea snail, a marine gastropod mollusk in the family Conidae, known as the cone snails, cone shells or cones.

Like all species within the genus Conus, these snails are predatory and venomous. They are capable of stinging humans, therefore live ones should be handled carefully or not at all.

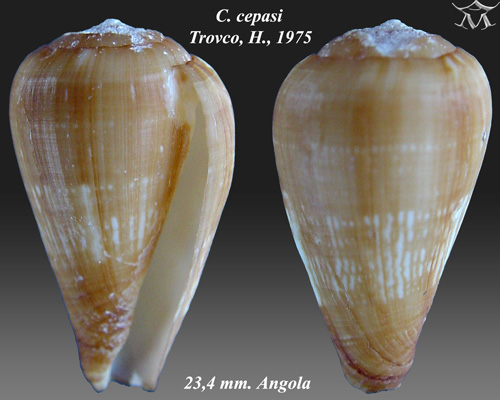
Conus cepasi Trovão, H., 1975

== Description ==
The size of the shell varies between 25 mm and 50 mm.

== Distribution ==
This marine species is endemic to Angola, Africa.
