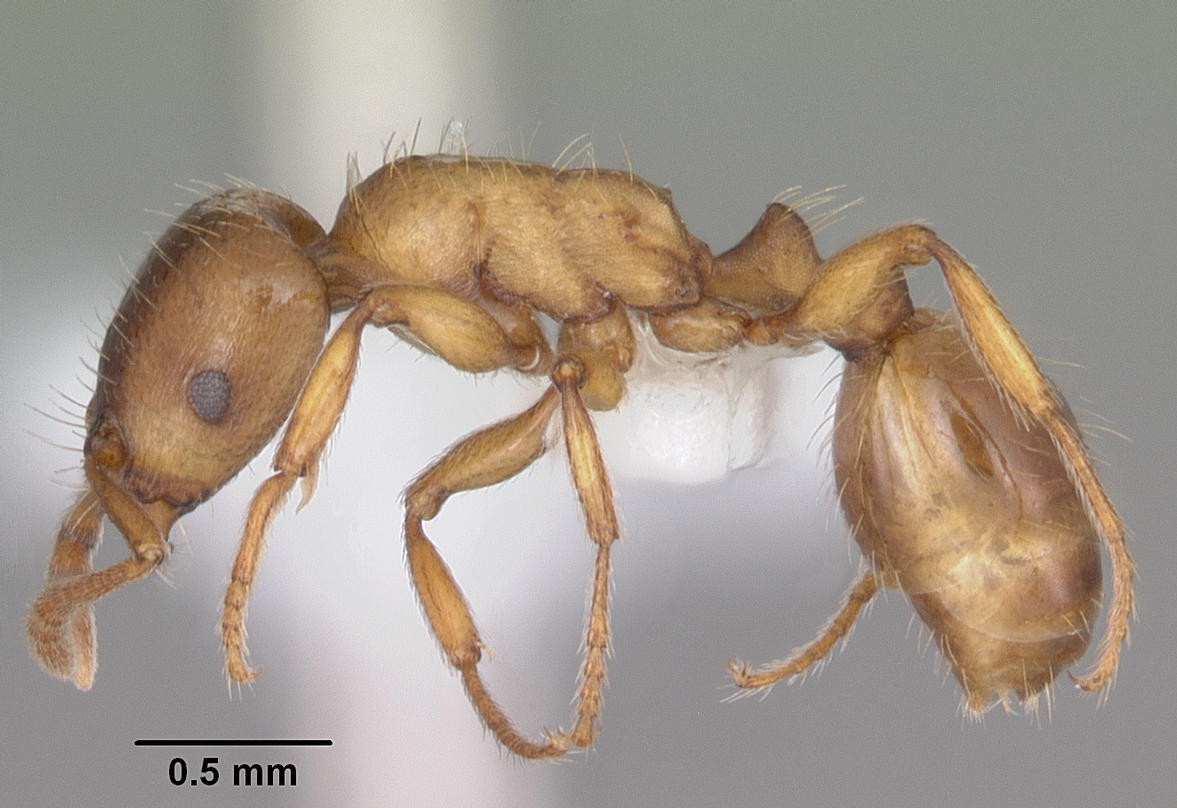
- Strongylognathus caeciliae worker

Conservation status
- Vulnerable (IUCN 2.3)

Scientific classification
- Domain: Eukaryota
- Kingdom: Animalia
- Phylum: Arthropoda
- Class: Insecta
- Order: Hymenoptera
- Family: Formicidae
- Subfamily: Myrmicinae
- Genus: Strongylognathus
- Species: S. caeciliae

Binomial name
- Strongylognathus caeciliae Forel, 1897

= Strongylognathus caeciliae =

Species of ant

Strongylognathus caeciliae is a species of ant in the subfamily Myrmicinae.
