= Acropora derawanensis =

Conservation status
- Vulnerable (IUCN 3.1)

Scientific classification
- Kingdom: Animalia
- Phylum: Cnidaria
- Subphylum: Anthozoa
- Class: Hexacorallia
- Order: Scleractinia
- Family: Acroporidae
- Genus: Acropora
- Species: A. derawanensis

Binomial name
- Acropora derawanensis Wallace, 1997

Species of coral

Acropora derawanensis is a species of acroporid coral that was first described by Carden Wallace in 1997. Found in tropical, shallow reefs sheltered from the waves in a marine environment, it is found at depths of 10 to 25 m (33 to 82 ft) on reef slopes. The species is rated as vulnerable on the IUCN Red List, with a decreasing population. It is not common but found over a large area, and is listed on CITES Appendix II. It is easily damaged.

== Description ==
Acropora derawanensis is found in colonies composed of upward-facing or flat collections of branches, and are up to 1 m (3.3 ft) wide. These branches reach lengths of up to 80 millimetres (3.1 in) and are easily damaged and thin, and the axial corallites on the end of the branches are long, and tube-like. These axial corallites have outer diameters of up to 1.4 millimetres (0.055 in) and are blue and white, while the species is generally a red-brown colour. The radial corallites, on the sides of the branches, are small and tube-shaped, and some can be sharp and "pocket-shaped". This uncommon coral resembles Acropora filiformis and Acropora kirstyae. It is found in a marine environment in tropical, shallow reefs that are sheltered from the waves, at depths of 10 to 25 m (33 to 82 ft), and is delicate. It reaches maturity at over eight years.

== Distribution ==
Acropora derawanesis is uncommon but found over a large area; central Indo-Pacific. This includes the Micronesia, Philippines, Pohnpei, and Southeast Asia. It is native to Singapore, Papua New Guinea, Indonesia (two regions) Micronesia, Australia, Malaysia, the Philippines, and Thailand. There is no population for it, but it is threatened by the decline of coral reefs, water temperatures increasing causing bleaching, coral disease, climate change, fishing, the acidification of oceans, pollution, and invasive species. Unlike other Acropora species, this species is not threatened by the Acanthaster planci as it is too fragile. Some specimens occur within Marine Protected Areas, it listed as a vulnerable species on the IUCN Red List as the population is decreasing, and is listed under Appendix II of CITES.

== Taxonomy ==
It was first described by C. C. Wallace in 1997 in Indonesia as Acropora derawanensis.
