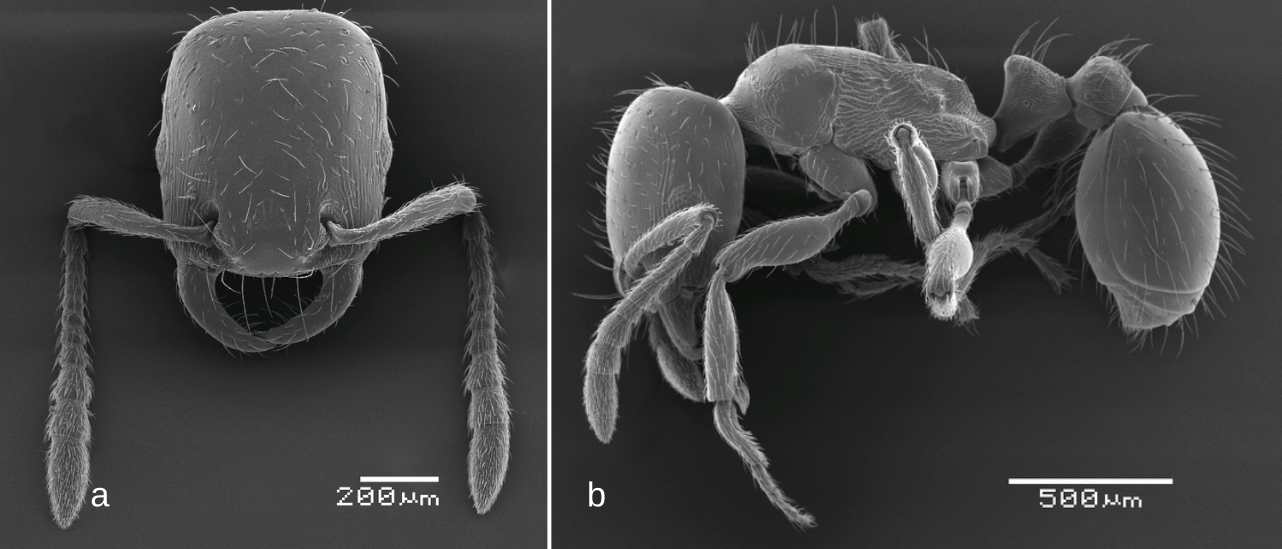

Conservation status
- Vulnerable (IUCN 2.3)

Scientific classification
- Kingdom: Animalia
- Phylum: Arthropoda
- Class: Insecta
- Order: Hymenoptera
- Family: Formicidae
- Subfamily: Myrmicinae
- Genus: Strongylognathus
- Species: S. afer

Binomial name
- Strongylognathus afer Emery, 1884

= Strongylognathus afer =

Species of ant

Strongylognathus afer is a species of ant in the genus Strongylognathus. It is endemic to Algeria.
