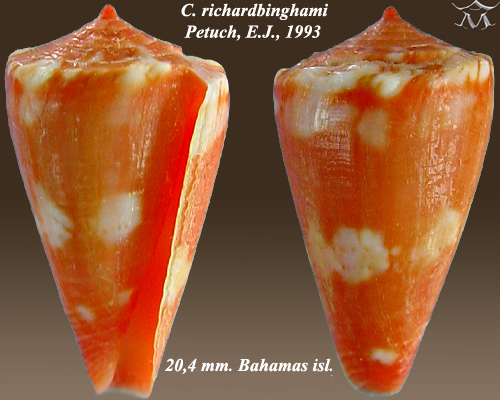
- Apertural and abapertural views of shell of Conus richardbinghami Petuch, E.J., 1993
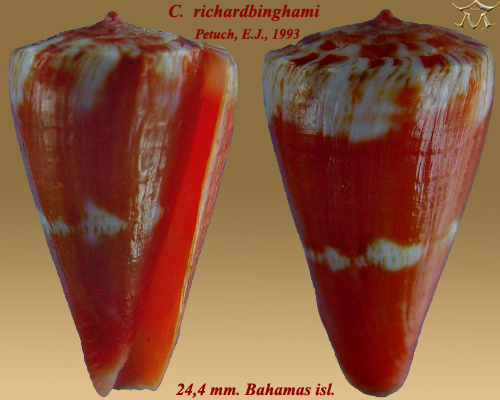

Conservation status
- Vulnerable (IUCN 3.1)

Scientific classification
- Kingdom: Animalia
- Phylum: Mollusca
- Class: Gastropoda
- Subclass: Caenogastropoda
- Order: Neogastropoda
- Superfamily: Conoidea
- Family: Conidae
- Genus: Conus
- Species: C. richardbinghami

Binomial name
- Conus richardbinghami Petuch, 1993

Synonyms
- Conus (Dauciconus) richardbinghami Petuch, 1993 · accepted, alternate representation; Purpuriconus richardbinghami (Petuch, 1993)

= Conus richardbinghami =

Species of sea snail

Conus richardbinghami is a species of sea snail, a marine gastropod mollusk in the family Conidae, the cone snails and their allies.

Like all species within the genus Conus, these snails are predatory and venomous. They are capable of stinging humans, therefore live ones should be handled carefully or not at all.

The specific name richardbinghami is in honor of Richard Bingham.

== Distribution ==
This marine species occurs off the Bahamas.

== Description ==
The maximum recorded shell length is 35 mm.

== Habitat ==
Minimum recorded depth is 1 m. Maximum recorded depth is 20 m.
