= Hypselostoma perigyra =

Conservation status
- Vulnerable (IUCN 3.1)

Scientific classification
- Kingdom: Animalia
- Phylum: Mollusca
- Class: Gastropoda
- Order: Stylommatophora
- Family: Hypselostomatidae
- Genus: Hypselostoma
- Species: H. perigyra

Binomial name
- Hypselostoma perigyra van Benthem-Jutting, 1950

Species of gastropod

Hypselostoma perigyra is a species of very small air-breathing land snail, a terrestrial pulmonate gastropod mollusc in the family Vertiginidae, the whorl snails.

== Distribution ==
The distribution of Hypselostoma perigyra includes an area near Bukit Takun, Selangor, in Peninsular Malaysia.
