= Cernuellopsis =

Conservation status
- Vulnerable (IUCN 3.1)

Scientific classification
- Kingdom: Animalia
- Phylum: Mollusca
- Class: Gastropoda
- Order: Stylommatophora
- Family: Geomitridae
- Genus: Cernuellopsis; Manganelli & Giusti, 1988
- Species: C. ghisottii

Binomial name
- Cernuellopsis ghisottii Manganelli & Giusti, 1988

Genus of molluscs

Cernuellopsis is a genus of air-breathing land snail, a terrestrial pulmonate gastropod mollusk in the family Geomitridae. It contains a single species, Cernuellopsis ghisottii, endemic to the Italian Peninsula.

The species epithet ghisottii refers to Dr. Fernando Ghisottii, former president of the Società Italiana di Malacologia, to whom the species was dedicated.

== Distribution ==
Cernuellopsis ghisottii is endemic to the Italian Peninsula. Only few populations are known from the central and south Apennines between 1500 and 2100 m. The species inhabits rocky areas (i.g. inland cliffs, mountain peaks) and grasslands. The type locality is Calabria, Mt. Pollino, Passo del Colle del Dragone (Italy).
