= Strongylognathus kervillei =

Conservation status
- Vulnerable (IUCN 2.3)

Scientific classification
- Kingdom: Animalia
- Phylum: Arthropoda
- Class: Insecta
- Order: Hymenoptera
- Family: Formicidae
- Subfamily: Myrmicinae
- Genus: Strongylognathus
- Species: S. kervillei

Binomial name
- Strongylognathus kervillei Santschi, 1921

Species of ant

Strongylognathus kervillei is a species of ant in the genus Strongylognathus. It is endemic to Turkey.
