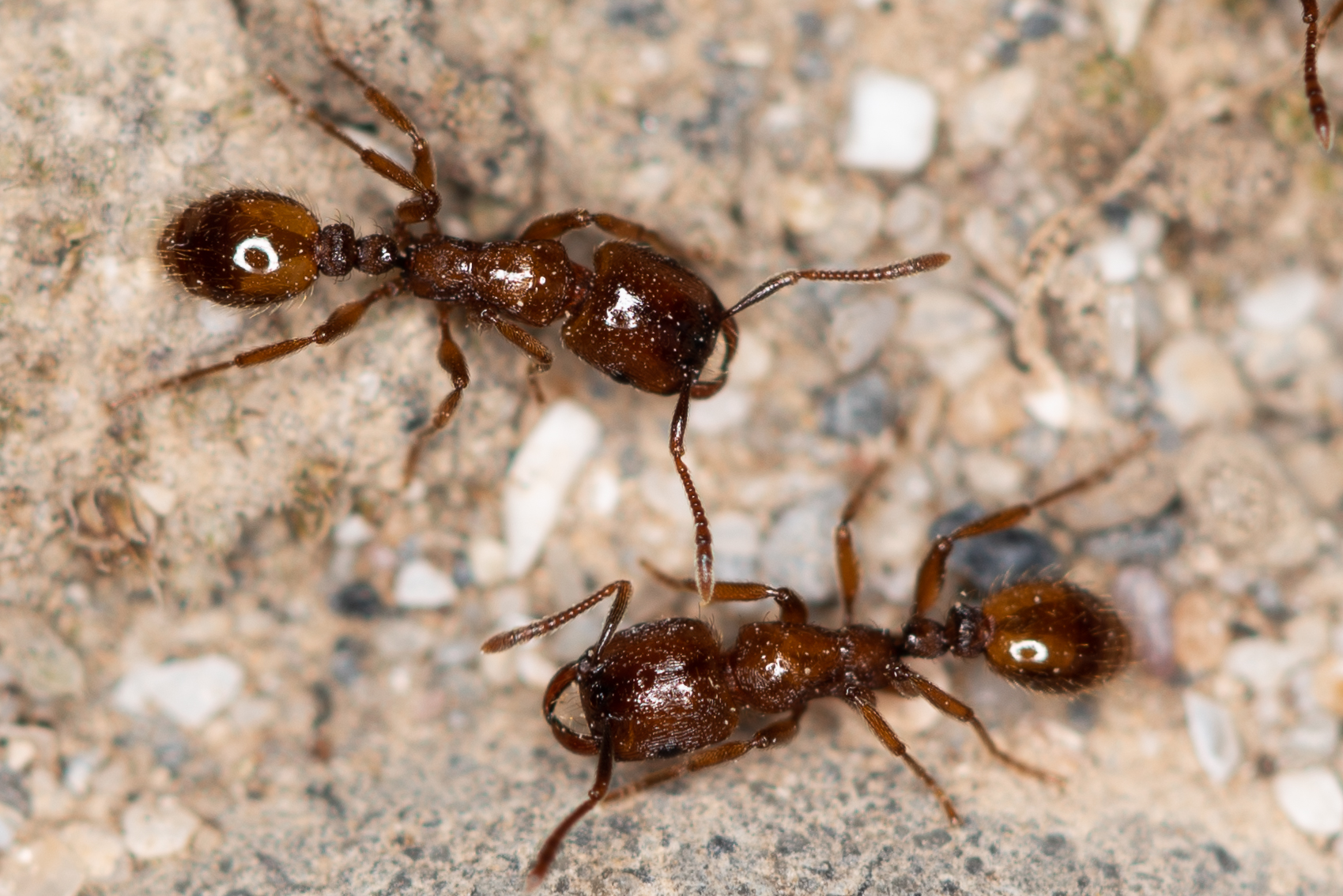

Conservation status
- Vulnerable (IUCN 2.3)

Scientific classification
- Kingdom: Animalia
- Phylum: Arthropoda
- Class: Insecta
- Order: Hymenoptera
- Family: Formicidae
- Subfamily: Myrmicinae
- Genus: Strongylognathus
- Species: S. arnoldii

Binomial name
- Strongylognathus arnoldii Radchenko, 1985

= Strongylognathus arnoldii =

Species of ant

Strongylognathus arnoldii is a species of ant in the subfamily Myrmicinae. It is endemic to Russia.
