= Menozzi =

Menozzi is an Italian surname. Notable persons with the surname include:

- Angelo Menozzi (1854–1947), Italian agricultural chemist and senator
- Carlo Menozzi (1892–1943), Italian entomologist
- Domenico Menozzi (1777–1841), Italian artist
