= Pisarski =

Pisarski is a Polish language habitational surname for someone from a place called Pisary. Notable people with the name include:

- Józef Pisarski (1913–1986), Polish boxer
- Maciej Pisarski, Polish diplomat
- Roman Pisarski (1912–1969), Polish children's writer
