= M. orientalis =

M. orientalis may refer to:

- Malus orientalis, the eastern crabapple
- Meliphaga orientalis, the Mountain honeyeater, a bird species found in Indonesia and Papua New Guinea
- Melogale orientalis, the Javan ferret-badger, a mammal species endemic to Java, Indonesia
- Merops orientalis, the green bee-eater or little green bee-eater, a bird species found widely distributed across sub-Saharan Africa
- Millettia orientalis, a legume species found only in Madagascar
- Mitra orientalis, a sea snail species
- Mogurnda orientalis, the eastern mogurnda, a fish species endemic to Papua New Guinea
- Mouldingia orientalis, an air-breathing land snail species endemic to Australia
- Myurella orientalis, a sea snail species

== See also ==
- Orientalis (disambiguation)
