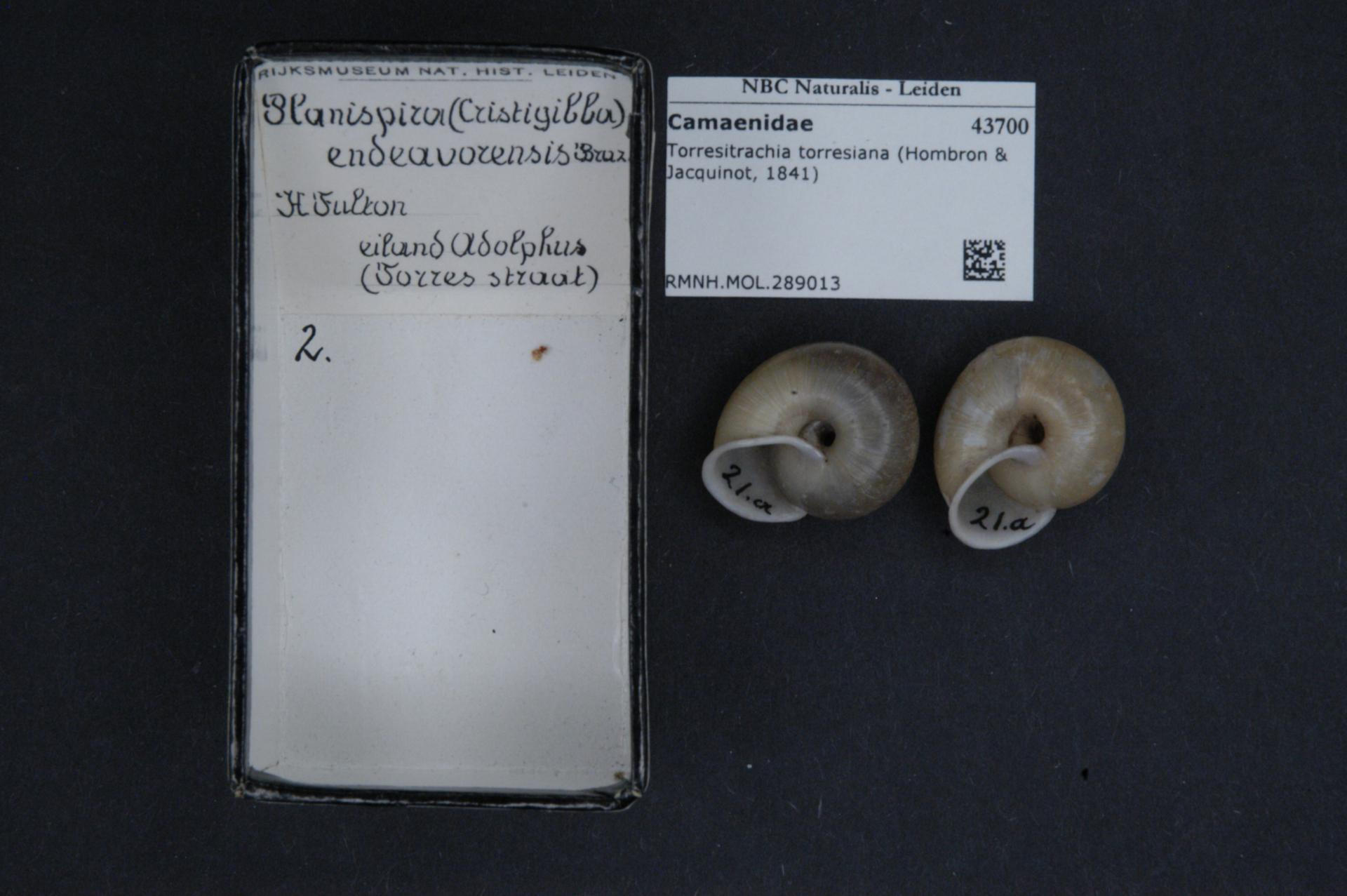
- Torresitrachia torresiana (Hombron & Jacquinot, c. 1841)

Scientific classification
- Kingdom: Animalia
- Phylum: Mollusca
- Class: Gastropoda
- Order: Stylommatophora
- Family: Camaenidae
- Genus: Torresitrachia; Iredale, 1939

= Torresitrachia =

Genus of gastropods

Torresitrachia is a genus of air-breathing land snails, terrestrial pulmonate gastropod mollusks in the family Camaenidae.

== Distribution ==
This genus is endemic to Australia, where it occurs in the tropical north of Queensland (Cape York Peninsula), the Northern Territory (south of the Gulf of Carpentaria and Arnhemland), and Western Australia (Kimberley).

== Description ==
Species of Torresitrachia are characterized by their small to medium-sized, discoidal shell, and a loosely coiling umbilicus. Shells are a uniform brownish in color and exhibit a sculpture of radial ribs or periostracal hairs.

== Species ==
Species within the genus Torresitrachia include:

- Torresitrachia amaxensis Solem, 1979
- Torresitrachia alenae Willan, Köhler, Kessner & Braby, 2009
- Torresitrachia bathurstensis (Smith, 1894)
- Torresitrachia cuttacutta Willan, Köhler, Kessner & Braby, 2009
- Torresitrachia crawfordi Solem, 1979
- Torresitrachia darwini Willan, Köhler, Kessner & Braby, 2009
- Torresitrachia funium Solem, 1981
- Torresitrachia monticola Iredale, 1939
- Torresitrachia regula Solem, 1979
- Torresitrachia stipata Iredale, 1938
- Torresitrachia thedana Solem, 1985
- Torresitrachia torresiana (Hombron & Jacquinot, 1841)
- Torresitrachia wallacei Willan, Köhler, Kessner & Braby, 2009
- Torresitrachia weaberana Solem, 1979
