= Vatusila =

Scientific classification
- Kingdom: Animalia
- Phylum: Mollusca
- Class: Gastropoda
- Order: Stylommatophora
- Family: Charopidae
- Subfamily: Charopinae
- Genus: Vatusila; Solem, 1983

Type species
- Vatusila tongensis Solem, 1983

Species
- †V. eniwetokensis (Ladd, 1958); V. kondoi Solem, 1983; V. nayauana Solem, 1983; V. niueana Solem, 1983; V. tongensis Solem, 1983; V. vaitupuensis Solem, 1983

Genus of gastropods

Vatusila is a genus of land snail found in Oceania. It consists of five extant and one fossil species. Alan Solem described and named the genus in 1983.

== Taxonomic history ==
The genus was circumscribed by the American malacologist Alan Solem in a 1983 monograph. He placed it in the subfamily Charopinae. Solem included six species in his original circumscription: V. eniwetokensis, V. kondoi, V. nayauana, V. niueana, V. tongensis, and V. vaitupuensis. Solem designated V. tongensis to be the genus's type species. The fossil species V. eniwetokensis was first described in 1958 by the American paleontologist Harry S. Ladd, who placed it in the genus Ptychodon; Solem described the five other extant species in his 1983 monograph.

The generic name Vatusila comes from a Fijian tribe of the same name which were located in the headwaters of the Sigatoka River on the island of Viti Levu. They are known for the 1867 murder and cannibalism of the missionary Thomas Baker. A review of Solem's monograph published in Systematic Biology noted his propensity for "creative generic nomenclature" which "may either lighten the reader's day or engender hostility" and alluded to this genus as one of its examples.

Vatusila and Sinployea are closely related genetically.

== Description ==
Solem notes that Vatusila species can have "rather widely different appearance of the sculpture and large size range". Their shells have 3½–5 whorls which can be coiled anywhere from rather tightly to normally. Their apical sculpture consists of 8–12 prominent, fine spiral chords. Their shells have a rounded lip.

== Geographic and temporal range ==
Islands where Vatusila are found

Vatusila species are found in various islands in the South Pacific. V. kondoi and V. nayauana are both found on Nayau, in the Lau Islands, Fiji. V. niueana is found on Niue. V. tongensis is found on ʻEua, Tonga. V. vaitupuensis is found on Vaitupu, Tuvalu. V. eniwetokensis was found on Enewetak, Marshall Islands. The distribution apparently changed during the Neogene.

The holotype and only specimen of V. eniwetokensis dates to the Upper Miocene,

== Conservation and threats ==
V. nayauana and V. kondoi are both critically endangered according to the IUCN Red List. They both live in forests on Nayau and their habitat is affected by increased wood harvesting. Rats, chickens, and pigs are predators of snails.

The IUCN also notes that the giant African snail, the rosy wolf snail, and the New Guinea flatworm, while not yet in Fiji, have become invasive throughout much of the Pacific and would have deleterious effects on the local land snail fauna. There is also concern about indigenous snail species being affected by invasive ant species; at least 9 have become established in the Lau Islands, including tramp species such as Anoplolepis gracilipes.
