= Turgenitubulus aslini =

Conservation status
- Vulnerable (IUCN 2.3)

Scientific classification
- Kingdom: Animalia
- Phylum: Mollusca
- Class: Gastropoda
- Order: Stylommatophora
- Family: Camaenidae
- Genus: Turgenitubulus
- Species: T. aslini

Binomial name
- Turgenitubulus aslini Solem, 1985

Species of gastropod

Turgenitubulus aslini is a species of air-breathing land snail, a terrestrial pulmonate gastropod mollusk in the family Camaenidae. This species is endemic to Australia.
