= Ordtrachia septentrionalis =

Conservation status
- Near Threatened (IUCN 2.3)

Scientific classification
- Kingdom: Animalia
- Phylum: Arthropoda
- Clade: Pancrustacea
- Class: Insecta
- Order: Lepidoptera
- Superfamily: Noctuoidea
- Family: Erebidae
- Subfamily: Arctiinae
- Genus: Ordtrachia
- Species: O. septentrionalis

Binomial name
- Ordtrachia septentrionalis Solem, 1984

Species of gastropod

Ordtrachia septentrionalis is a species of air-breathing land snail, a terrestrial pulmonate gastropod mollusk in the family Camaenidae. This species is endemic to Australia.
