= Cooperconcha centralis =

Conservation status
- Near Threatened (IUCN 2.3)

Scientific classification
- Kingdom: Animalia
- Phylum: Mollusca
- Class: Gastropoda
- Order: Stylommatophora
- Family: Camaenidae
- Genus: Cooperconcha
- Species: C. centralis

Binomial name
- Cooperconcha centralis Solem, 1992

Species of gastropod

Cooperconcha centralis is a species of air-breathing land snail, a pulmonate gastropod mollusk in the family Camaenidae.

== Distribution ==
This species is endemic to Australia.
