= Westraltrachia recta =

Conservation status
- Vulnerable (IUCN 2.3)

Scientific classification
- Kingdom: Animalia
- Phylum: Mollusca
- Class: Gastropoda
- Order: Stylommatophora
- Family: Camaenidae
- Genus: Westraltrachia
- Species: W. recta

Binomial name
- Westraltrachia recta Solem, 1984

Species of gastropod

Westraltrachia recta is a species of air-breathing land snails, a terrestrial pulmonate gastropod mollusk in the family Camaenidae. This species is endemic to Australia.
