= Westraltrachia inopinata =

Conservation status
- Vulnerable (IUCN 2.3)

Scientific classification
- Kingdom: Animalia
- Phylum: Mollusca
- Class: Gastropoda
- Order: Stylommatophora
- Family: Camaenidae
- Genus: Westraltrachia
- Species: W. inopinata

Binomial name
- Westraltrachia inopinata Solem, 1984

Species of gastropod

Westraltrachia inopinata is a species of air-breathing land snails, a terrestrial pulmonate gastropod mollusk in the family Camaenidae.

== Distribution ==
This species is endemic to Western Australia and occurs at the south side of the Napier Range.
