= Mesodontrachia desmonda =

Conservation status
- Near Threatened (IUCN 2.3)

Scientific classification
- Kingdom: Animalia
- Phylum: Mollusca
- Class: Gastropoda
- Order: Stylommatophora
- Family: Camaenidae
- Genus: Mesodontrachia
- Species: M. desmonda

Binomial name
- Mesodontrachia desmonda Solem, 1985

Species of gastropod

Mesodontrachia desmonda is a species of air-breathing land snail, a terrestrial pulmonate gastropod mollusk in the family Camaenidae. This species is endemic to Australia.
