= Thomas Baker (missionary) =

British Methodist missionary (1832–1867)

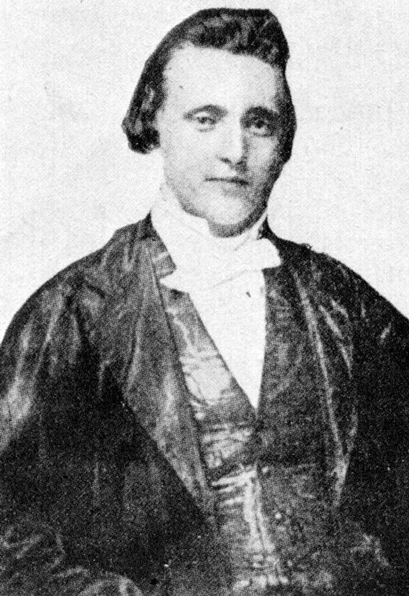
- Thomas Baker around 1860
- Born: 6 February 1832; United Kingdom
- Died: 21 July 1867 (aged 35); Viti Levu, Fiji

Thomas Baker (6 February 1832 – 21 July 1867) was a Methodist missionary in Fiji, known as being the only missionary in the archipelago to be killed and eaten, along with seven of his Fijian followers. The incident occurred in the Navosa Highlands of western Viti Levu in July 1867, and the rock used to kill Baker is still displayed in the village of Nabutatau. The soles of his leather sandals, which were also cooked by the cannibal tribe, are preserved at the Fiji Museum in Suva. Records show that Baker was killed and eaten as a result of him touching a chief's head, which is considered disrespectful in Fijian culture.

== Final mission ==
In July 1867, Baker led a party into the interior of Viti Levu, passing through the Taukei ni Waluvu's Christian enclave on the East bank of the Wainimala River. When Baker met a local chief of Navatusila, Baker presented a British comb as a gift and attempted to persuade him to convert to Christianity. When the chief refused, Baker decided to take his comb back, touching the chief's head as he did so, which was taken as a threat and offense in Fijian customs. In pursuing revenge, a chief of Naitasiri gave a tabua (whale tooth) to the clan to seal the plot to kill the party, and for the body of Thomas Baker to be cannibalised and distributed in the old traditional village of Nabialevu (Nadrau).

Baker was killed along with seven Fijian Christian workers. The Fijians who were cannibalized with Baker were: Setareki Seileka, Sisa Tuilekutu, Navitalai Torau, Nemani Raqio, Taniela Batirerega, Josefata Tabuakarawa, and Setareki Nadu. Two other men, Aisea and Josefa Nagata, escaped the massacre. After Baker's death, the Davuilevu mission was temporarily closed in 1868.

In 2003, Baker's relatives visited the village for a traditional matanigasau reconciliation ceremony. This was offered in apology for the killing by descendants of Baker's slayers.

== Legacy ==
The story of Baker's death is the basis for Jack London's short story "The Whale Tooth".

In 1983, the American malacologist Alan Solem named the genus Vatusila "after the Fijian tribe (located at the headwaters of the Sigatoka River) that killed and ate Rev. Thomas Baker, a Wesleyan missionary, on July 21, 1867."

== See also ==
- Cannibalism in Oceania
