= Cristilabrum grossum =

Conservation status
- Endangered (IUCN 2.3)

Scientific classification
- Kingdom: Animalia
- Phylum: Mollusca
- Class: Gastropoda
- Order: Stylommatophora
- Family: Camaenidae
- Genus: Cristilabrum
- Species: C. grossum

Binomial name
- Cristilabrum grossum Solem, 1981

Species of gastropod

Cristilabrum grossum is a species of air-breathing land snail, a terrestrial pulmonate gastropod mollusk in the family Camaenidae. This species is endemic to Australia.
