= Prymnbriareus nimberlinus =

Conservation status
- Least Concern (IUCN 2.3)

Scientific classification
- Kingdom: Animalia
- Phylum: Mollusca
- Class: Gastropoda
- Order: Stylommatophora
- Family: Camaenidae
- Genus: Prymnbriareus
- Species: P. nimberlinus

Binomial name
- Prymnbriareus nimberlinus Solem, 1981

Species of gastropod

Prymnbriareus nimberlinus is a species of air-breathing land snail, a terrestrial pulmonate gastropod mollusk in the family Camaenidae. This species is endemic to Australia.

== Sources ==
- 2006 IUCN Red List of Threatened Species. Downloaded on 7 August 2007.
