= Ordtrachia =

Scientific classification
- Kingdom: Animalia
- Phylum: Arthropoda
- Clade: Pancrustacea
- Class: Insecta
- Order: Lepidoptera
- Superfamily: Noctuoidea
- Family: Erebidae
- Subfamily: Arctiinae
- Tribe: Lithosiini
- Genus: Ordtrachia; Solem, 1984

Genus of gastropods

Ordtrachia is a genus of air-breathing land snails, terrestrial pulmonate gastropod mollusks in the family Camaenidae.

== Species ==
Species within the genus Ordtrachia include:

- Ordtrachia australis
- Ordtrachia elegans
- Ordtrachia septentrionalis
