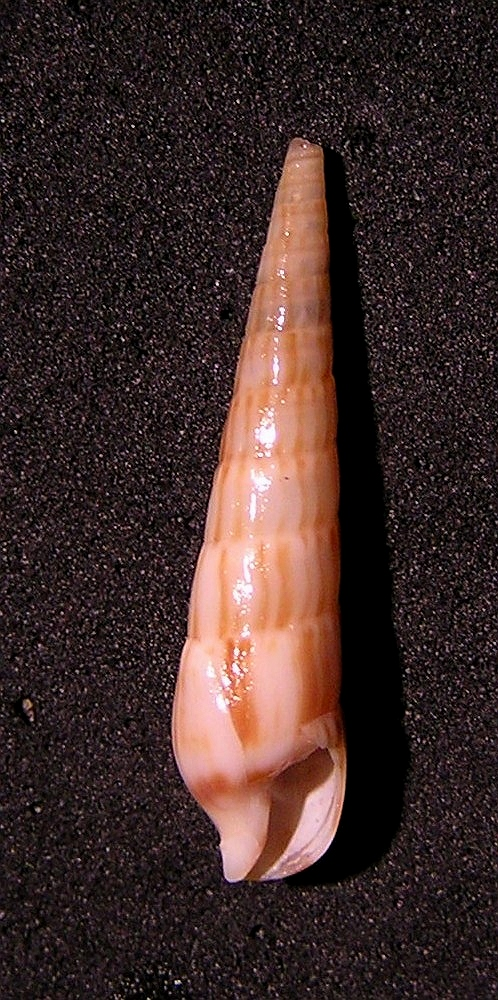
- Apertural view of a shell of Profunditerebra brazieri

Scientific classification
- Kingdom: Animalia
- Phylum: Mollusca
- Class: Gastropoda
- Subclass: Caenogastropoda
- Order: Neogastropoda
- Superfamily: Conoidea
- Family: Terebridae
- Genus: Profunditerebra
- Species: P. brazieri

Binomial name
- Profunditerebra brazieri (Angas, 1871)

Synonyms
- Acuminia brazieri (Angas, 1932); Terebra brazieri Angas, 1871

= Profunditerebra brazieri =

Species of gastropod

Profunditerebra brazieri is a species of sea snail, a marine gastropod mollusk in the family Terebridae, the auger snails.

== Description ==
The length of the shell varies between 20 mm and 40 mm.

== Distribution ==
This marine species occurs off New South Wales and South Australia; off Tasmania.
