= Mesodontrachia =

Scientific classification
- Kingdom: Animalia
- Phylum: Mollusca
- Class: Gastropoda
- Order: Stylommatophora
- Family: Camaenidae
- Genus: Mesodontrachia; Solem, 1985

Genus of gastropods

Mesodontrachia is a genus of air-breathing land snail, a terrestrial pulmonate gastropod mollusk in the family Camaenidae.

== Species ==
Species within the genus Mesodontrachia include:

- Mesodontrachia desmonda
- Mesodontrachia fitzroyana
