= Mouldingia =

Scientific classification
- Kingdom: Animalia
- Phylum: Mollusca
- Class: Gastropoda
- Order: Stylommatophora
- Family: Camaenidae
- Genus: Mouldingia; Solem, 1984

Genus of gastropods

Mouldingia is a genus of air-breathing land snails, terrestrial pulmonate gastropod mollusks in the family Camaenidae.

== Species ==
Species within the genus Mouldingia include:

- Mouldingia occidentalis
- Mouldingia orientalis
