= Turgenitubulus =

Scientific classification
- Kingdom: Animalia
- Phylum: Mollusca
- Class: Gastropoda
- Order: Stylommatophora
- Family: Camaenidae
- Genus: Turgenitubulus; Solem, 1981

Genus of gastropods

Turgenitubulus is a genus of land snails in the family Camaenidae. This genus is endemic to Australia.

Species include:

- Turgenitubulus aslini
- Turgenitubulus christenseni
- Turgenitubulus costus
- Turgenitubulus depressus
- Turgenitubulus foramenus
- Turgenitubulus opiranus
- Turgenitubulus pagodula
- Turgenitubulus tanmurrana
