= Profunditerebra hiscocki =

Scientific classification
- Kingdom: Animalia
- Phylum: Mollusca
- Class: Gastropoda
- Subclass: Caenogastropoda
- Order: Neogastropoda
- Superfamily: Conoidea
- Family: Terebridae
- Genus: Profunditerebra
- Species: P. hiscocki

Binomial name
- Profunditerebra hiscocki (Sprague, 2004)

Synonyms
- Myurella hiscocki (Sprague, 2004); Terebra hiscocki Sprague, 2004

Species of gastropod

Profunditerebra hiscocki is a species of sea snail, a marine gastropod mollusk in the family Terebridae, the auger snails.
