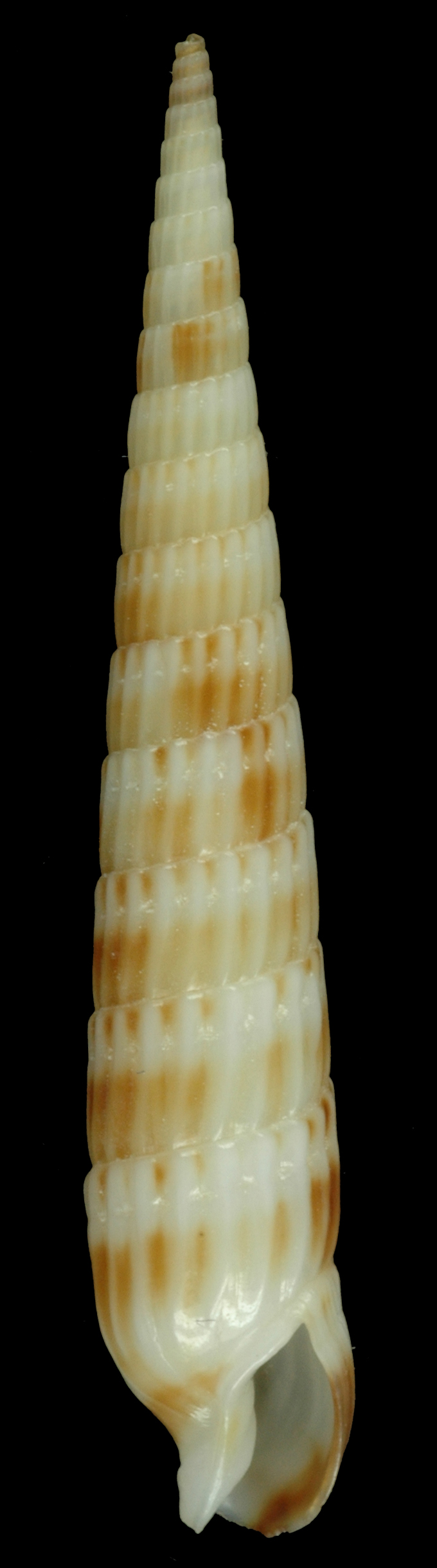
- Shell of Profunditerebra anseeuwi (specimen at MNHN, Paris)

Scientific classification
- Kingdom: Animalia
- Phylum: Mollusca
- Class: Gastropoda
- Subclass: Caenogastropoda
- Order: Neogastropoda
- Superfamily: Conoidea
- Family: Terebridae
- Genus: Profunditerebra
- Species: P. anseeuwi

Binomial name
- Profunditerebra anseeuwi (Terryn, 2005)

Synonyms
- † Duplicaria anseeuwi (Terryn, 2005); Terebra anseeuwi Terryn, 2005

= Profunditerebra anseeuwi =

Species of gastropod

Profunditerebra anseeuwi is a species of sea snail, a marine gastropod mollusk in the family Terebridae, the auger snails.

== Distribution ==
This marine species occurs in the Solomon Sea.
