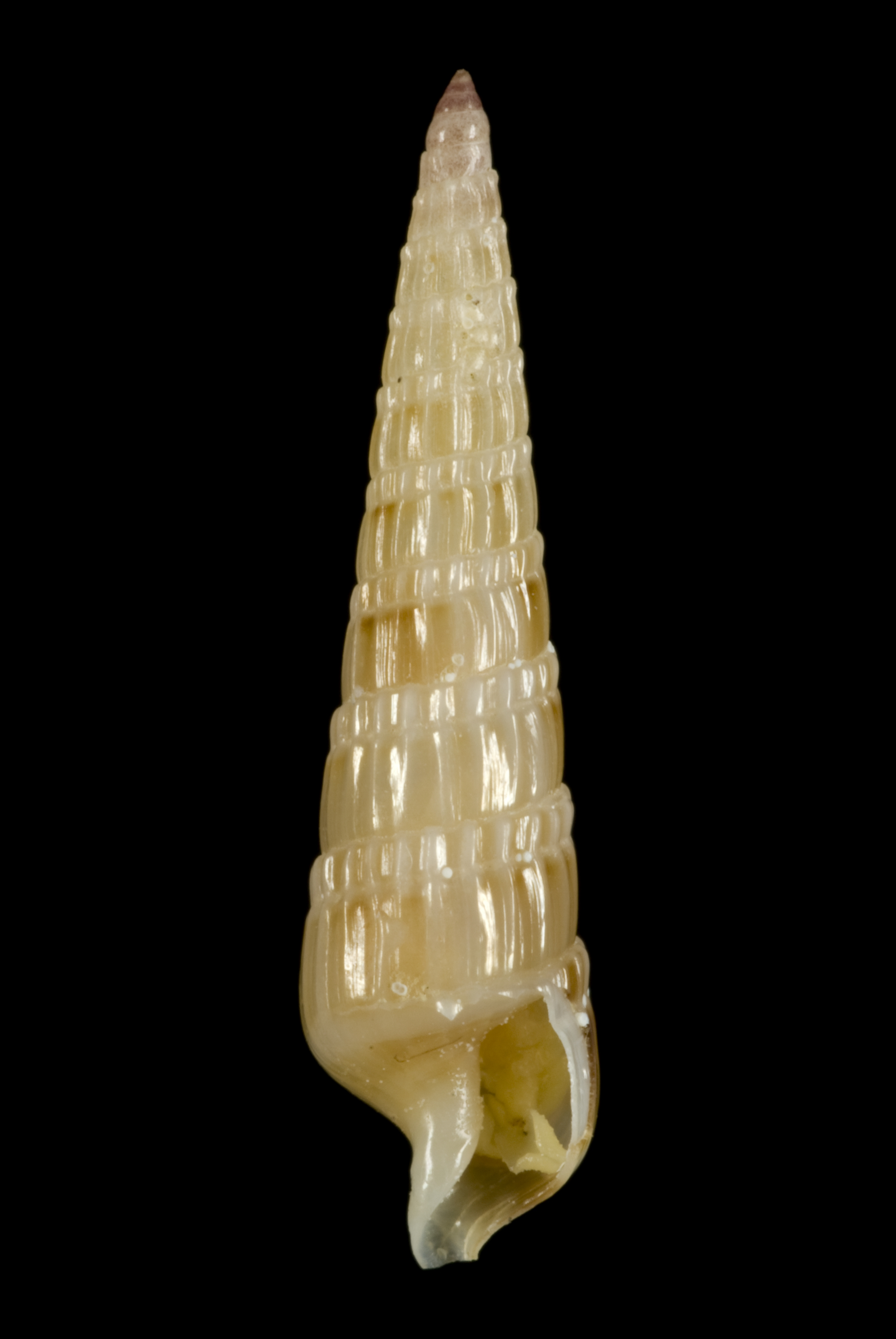

Scientific classification
- Kingdom: Animalia
- Phylum: Mollusca
- Class: Gastropoda
- Subclass: Caenogastropoda
- Order: Neogastropoda
- Superfamily: Conoidea
- Family: Terebridae
- Genus: Profunditerebra
- Species: P. poppei

Binomial name
- Profunditerebra poppei (Terryn, 2003)

Synonyms
- Clathroterebra poppei (Terryn, 2003); Terebra poppei Terryn, 2003

= Profunditerebra poppei =

Species of gastropod

Profunditerebra poppei is a species of sea snail, a marine gastropod mollusk in the family Terebridae, the auger snails.
