= Kimberleytrachia =

Scientific classification
- Kingdom: Animalia
- Phylum: Mollusca
- Class: Gastropoda
- Order: Stylommatophora
- Family: Camaenidae
- Subfamily: Hadrinae
- Genus: Kimberleytrachia; Köhler, 2011

Type species
- Kimberleytrachia somniator Köhler, 2011

Species
- See text

Genus of gastropod

Kimberleytrachia is a genus of air-breathing land snail, a terrestrial pulmonate gastropod mollusk in the family Camaenidae.

== Species ==
The World Register of Marine Species accepts the following species within Kimberleytrachia:

- Kimberleytrachia achernaria Köhler, 2011
- Kimberleytrachia aequum Köhler, 2011
- Kimberleytrachia alphacentauri Köhler, 2011
- Kimberleytrachia amplirhagadoides Köhler, 2011
- Kimberleytrachia bachstenensis Köhler & Criscione, 2017
- Kimberleytrachia canopi Köhler, 2011
- Kimberleytrachia chartacea Köhler, 2011
- Kimberleytrachia crawfordi (Solem, 1979)
- Kimberleytrachia crucis Köhler, 2011
- Kimberleytrachia deflecta (Solem, 1985)
- Kimberleytrachia hirsuta Köhler, 2011
- Kimberleytrachia jacksonensis Criscione & Köhler, 2014
- Kimberleytrachia nelsonensis Criscione & Köhler, 2014
- Kimberleytrachia serrata Criscione & Köhler, 2014
- Kimberleytrachia setosa Criscione & Köhler, 2014
- Kimberleytrachia silvaepluvialis Criscione & Köhler, 2014
- Kimberleytrachia somniator Köhler, 2011
- Kimberleytrachia umbonis (Solem, 1979)
