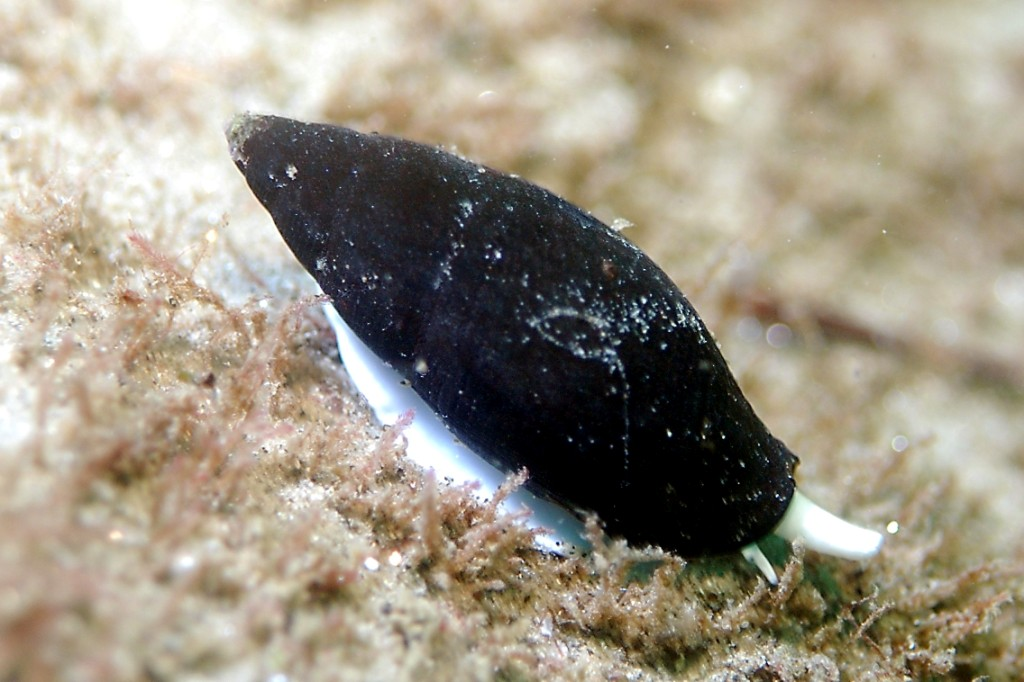

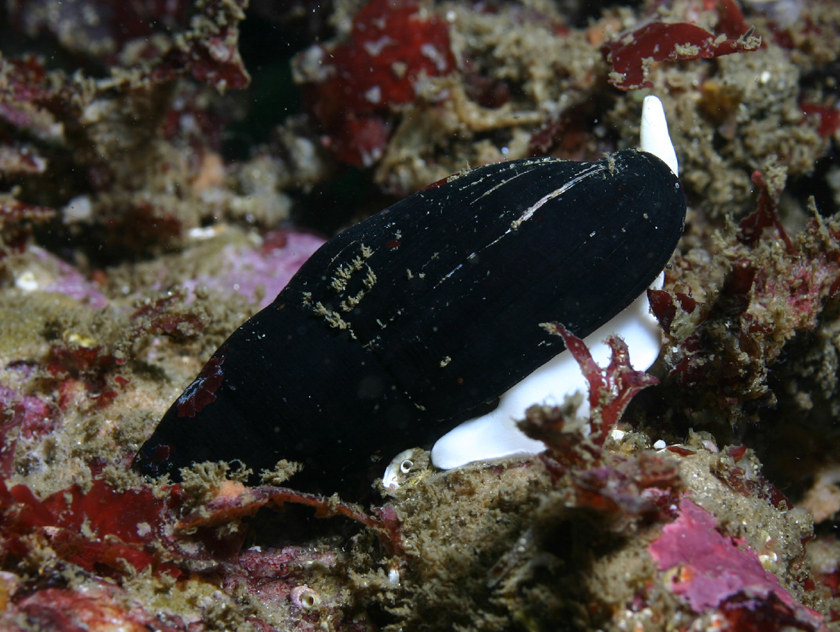

Scientific classification
- Kingdom: Animalia
- Phylum: Mollusca
- Class: Gastropoda
- Subclass: Caenogastropoda
- Order: Neogastropoda
- Family: Mitridae
- Genus: Atrimitra
- Species: A. idae

Binomial name
- Atrimitra idae (Melvill, 1893)

Synonyms
- Mitra idae Melvill, 1893

= Atrimitra idae =

Species of gastropod

Atrimitra idae, common name Ida's miter, is a species of medium-sized sea snail, a marine gastropod mollusk in the family Mitridae, the miters.

== Distribution ==
This miter lives from Northern California, United States, to Baja California, Mexico.

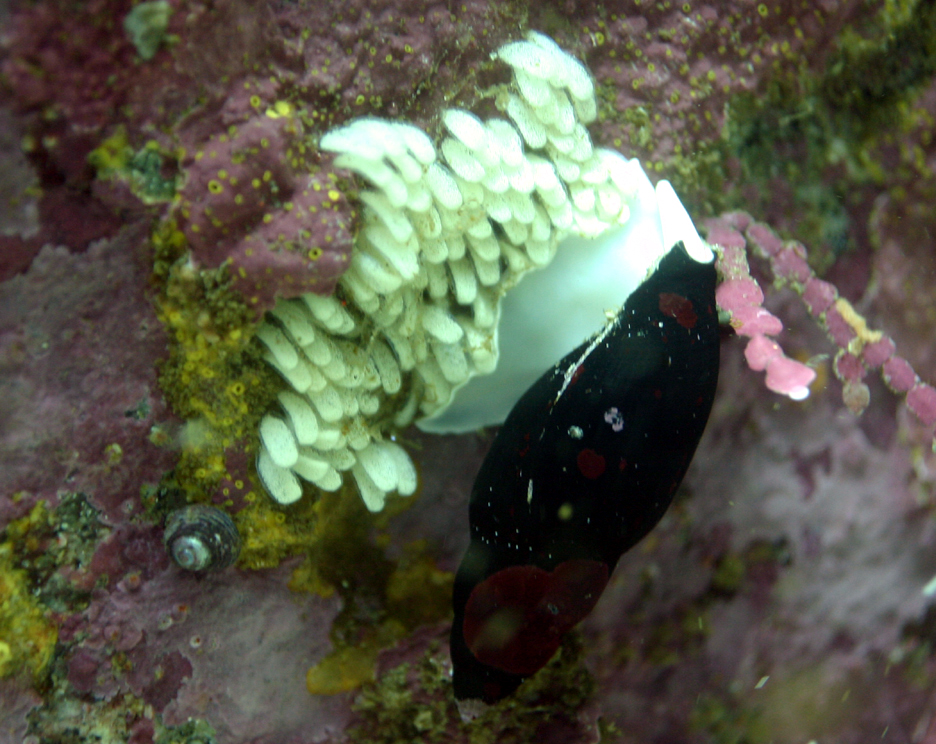
Ida's miter with egg capsules

== Description ==
The shell of this species is strong and heavy. The shells of adults vary from 20 to 60 mm in length. There are three folds on the columella.

The shell itself is a pinkish-tan color, but in life the shell is covered in a strong black periostracum.

The body of the animal is all pure white other than its black eye spots.

== Life habits ==
This miter lays egg capsules attached to rock surfaces. They are yellow or transparent, and about 8mm high. In laboratory conditions, females have been observed depositing over 90 egg capsules in 4 days, and 173 in 17 days. Each capsule contains hundreds of 0.2mm eggs. Veliger larvae hatch from the capsule after ~24 days, depending on temperature.

The species is a specialized carnivore, and can live for weeks without food.

== Etymology ==
Atrimitra idae was described as Mitra idae by James Cosmo Melvill in 1893, who named the species after conchologist Ida Shepard Oldroyd.
