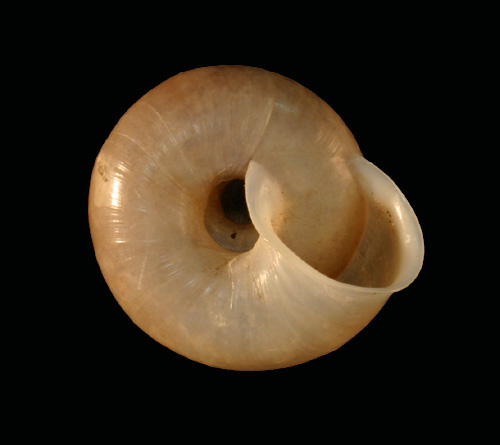
- Ningbingia bulla

Scientific classification
- Kingdom: Animalia
- Phylum: Mollusca
- Class: Gastropoda
- Order: Stylommatophora
- Family: Camaenidae
- Genus: Ningbingia; Solem, 1981

= Ningbingia =

Genus of gastropods

Ningbingia is a genus of land snails in the family Camaenidae. This genus is endemic to Kimberley in Western Australia.

Ningbingia is differentiated from other genera by the morphology of the penis. Species in the genus have shells of average size with raised spires.

== Species ==
Species include:

- Ningbingia australis
- Ningbingia bulla
- Ningbingia dentiens
- Ningbingia laurina
- Ningbingia octava
- Ningbingia res
