= Mouldingia orientalis =

Conservation status
- Endangered (IUCN 2.3)

Scientific classification
- Kingdom: Animalia
- Phylum: Mollusca
- Class: Gastropoda
- Order: Stylommatophora
- Family: Camaenidae
- Genus: Mouldingia
- Species: M. orientalis

Binomial name
- Mouldingia orientalis Solem, 1984

Species of snail

Mouldingia orientalis is a species of air-breathing land snails, terrestrial pulmonate gastropod mollusks in the family Camaenidae. This species is endemic to Australia.
