= Glyptorhagada bordaensis =

Conservation status
- Vulnerable (IUCN 2.3)

Scientific classification
- Kingdom: Animalia
- Phylum: Mollusca
- Class: Gastropoda
- Order: Stylommatophora
- Family: Camaenidae
- Genus: Glyptorhagada
- Species: G. bordaensis

Binomial name
- Glyptorhagada bordaensis Angas, 1880

Species of gastropod

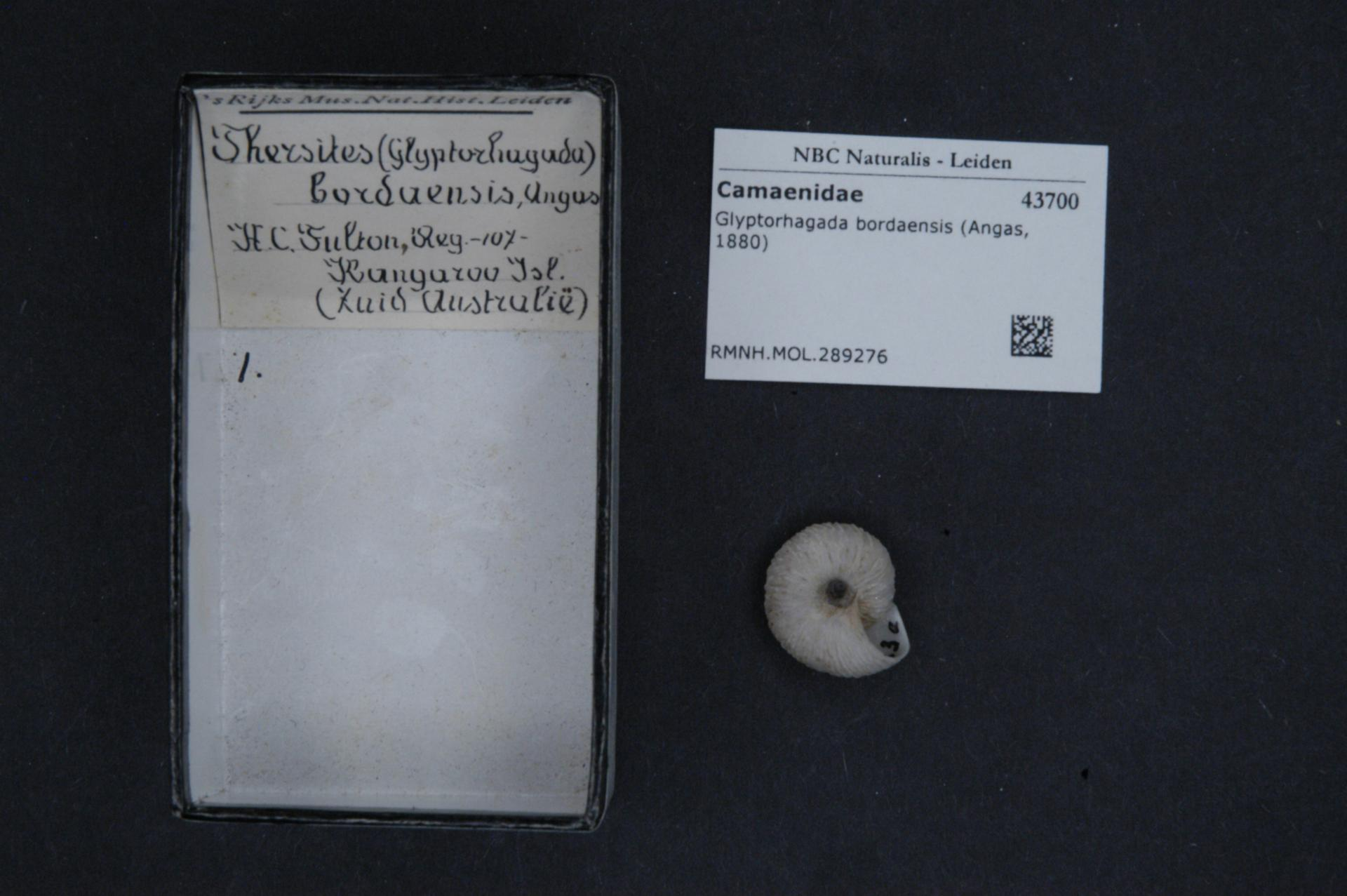
Picture of mollusk

Glyptorhagada bordaensis is a species of air-breathing land snails, terrestrial pulmonate gastropod mollusks in the family Camaenidae. This species is endemic to Australia.
