= Kimboraga micromphala =

Conservation status
- Vulnerable (IUCN 2.3)

Scientific classification
- Kingdom: Animalia
- Phylum: Mollusca
- Class: Gastropoda
- Order: Stylommatophora
- Family: Camaenidae
- Genus: Kimboraga
- Species: K. micromphala

Binomial name
- Kimboraga micromphala Gude, 1907

Species of gastropod

Kimboraga micromphala is a species of air-breathing land snails, terrestrial pulmonate gastropod mollusks in the family Camaenidae. This species is endemic to Australia.
