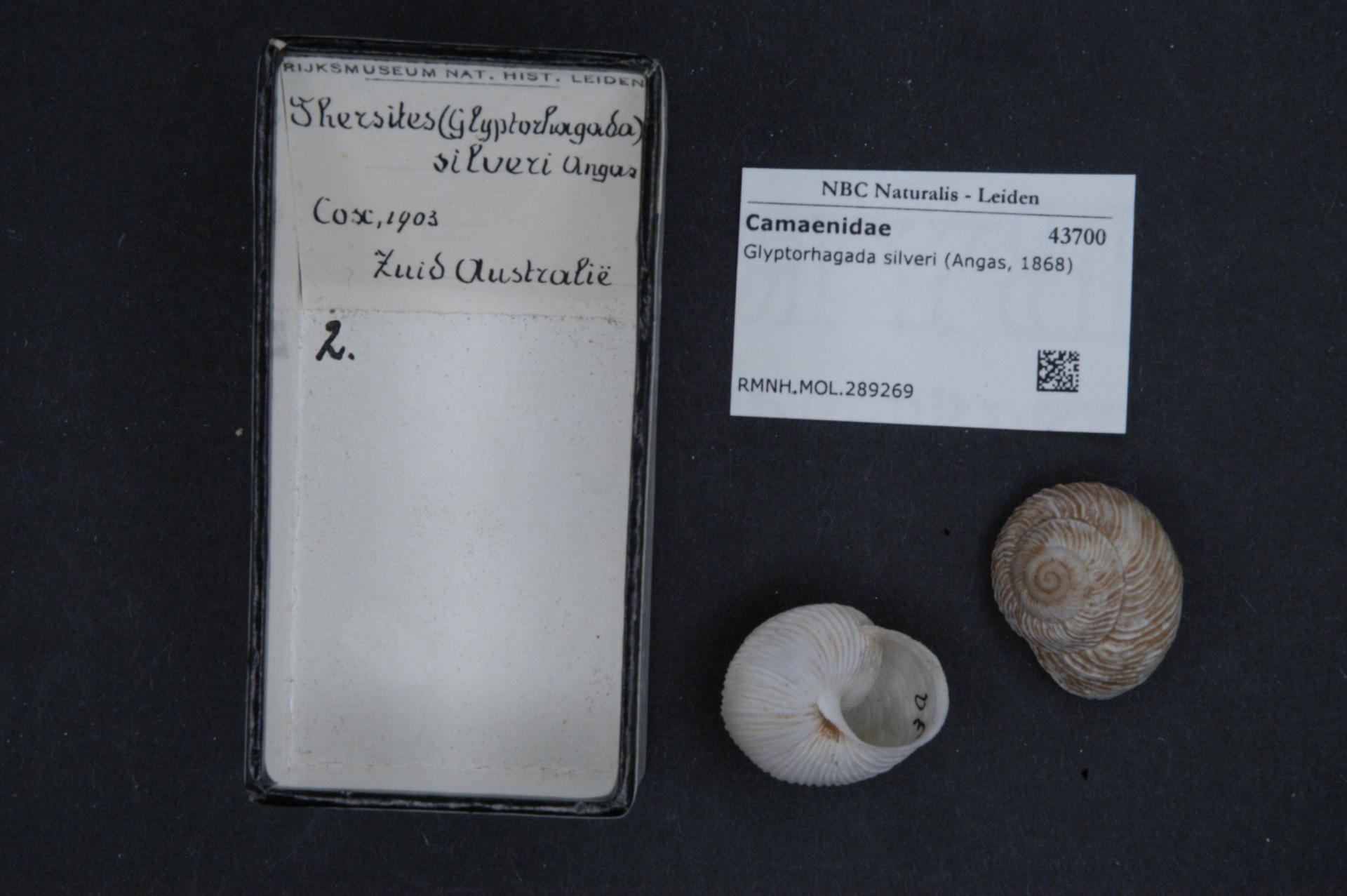
- Preserved specimen of Glyptorhagada silveri at the Rijksmuseum van Natuurlijke Historie, Leiden

Conservation status
- Endangered (IUCN 2.3)

Scientific classification
- Kingdom: Animalia
- Phylum: Mollusca
- Class: Gastropoda
- Order: Stylommatophora
- Family: Camaenidae
- Genus: Glyptorhagada
- Species: G. silveri

Binomial name
- Glyptorhagada silveri Angas, 1868

= Glyptorhagada silveri =

Species of gastropod

Glyptorhagada silveri is a species of air-breathing land snails, terrestrial pulmonate gastropod mollusks in the family Camaenidae. This species is endemic to Australia.
