= Atrimitra =

Scientific classification
- Kingdom: Animalia
- Phylum: Mollusca
- Class: Gastropoda
- Subclass: Caenogastropoda
- Order: Neogastropoda
- Superfamily: Mitroidea
- Family: Mitridae
- Genus: Atrimitra; Dall, 1918

Species
- See text

Genus of gastropods

Atrimitra is a genus of sea snails, marine gastropod mollusks in the family Mitridae.

== Species ==
Species within the genus Atrimitra include:

- Atrimitra caliginosa
- Atrimitra catalinae
- Atrimitra effusa
- Atrimitra idae
- Atrimitra orientalis
- Atrimitra semigranosa
