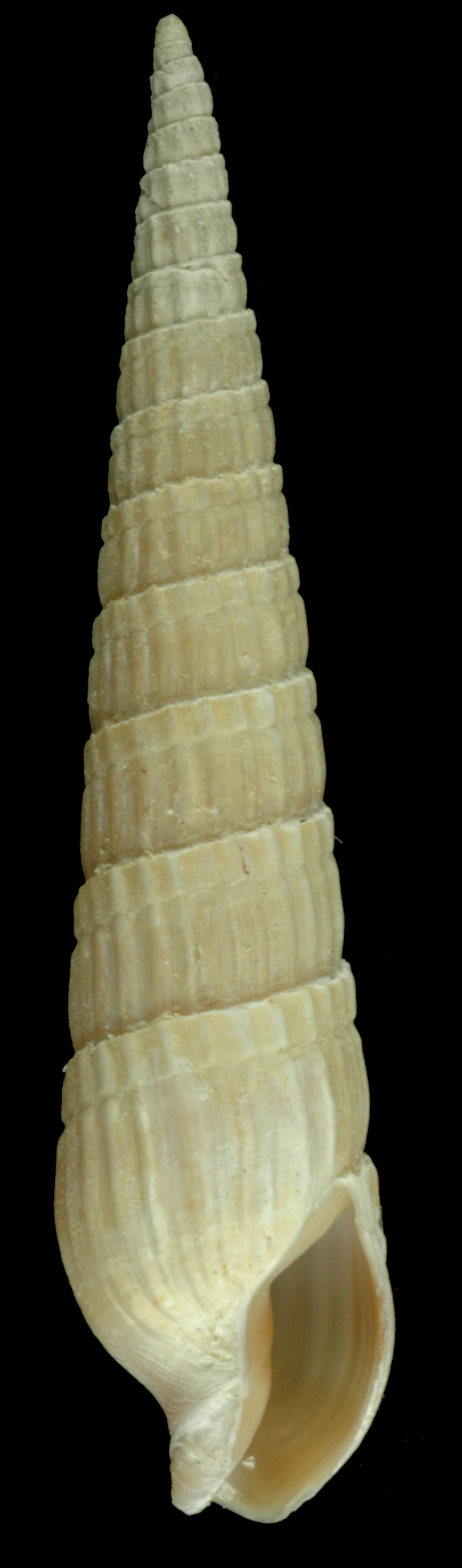
- Shell of Profunditerebra papuaprofundi (paratype at MNHN, Paris)

Scientific classification
- Kingdom: Animalia
- Phylum: Mollusca
- Class: Gastropoda
- Subclass: Caenogastropoda
- Order: Neogastropoda
- Superfamily: Conoidea
- Family: Terebridae
- Genus: Profunditerebra; Fedosov, Malcolm, Terryn, Gorson, Modica, Holford & Puillandre, 2020

Type species
- Profunditerebra papuaprofundi Malcolm, Terryn & Fedosov, 2020

Species
- See text

= Profunditerebra =

Genus of gastropods

Profunditerebra is a genus of marine snails, gastropod mollusks in the family Terebridae, subfamily Terebrinae.

== Species ==
Species within the genus Profunditerebra include:

- Profunditerebra anseeuwi (Terryn, 2005)
- Profunditerebra brazieri (Angas, 1871)
- Profunditerebra evelynae (Clench & Aguayo, 1939)
- Profunditerebra hiscocki (Sprague, 2004)
- Profunditerebra macclesfieldensis Malcolm, Terryn & Fedosov, 2020
- Profunditerebra okudai (Poppe, Tagaro & Goto, 2018)
- Profunditerebra omanensis (Gargiulo, 2018)
- Profunditerebra orientalis (Aubry, 1999)
- Profunditerebra papuaprofundi Malcolm, Terryn & Fedosov, 2020
- Profunditerebra poppei (Terryn, 2003)
