= Westraltrachia =

Scientific classification
- Kingdom: Animalia
- Phylum: Mollusca
- Class: Gastropoda
- Order: Stylommatophora
- Family: Camaenidae
- Genus: Westraltrachia; Iredale, 1933

Synonyms
- Parrhagada Iredale, T. 1938; Zygotrachia Iredale, T. 1939

Genus of gastropods

Westraltrachia is a genus of land snails in the family Camaenidae.

== Distribution ==
This genus of land snails occurs in the northern coastal area of Western Australia.

Species include:

- Westraltrachia alterna
- Westraltrachia ampla
- Westraltrachia ascita
- Westraltrachia commoda
- Westraltrachia cunicula
- Westraltrachia derbyi
- Westraltrachia froggatti
- Westraltrachia inopinata
- Westraltrachia instita
- Westraltrachia lievreana
- Westraltrachia limbana
- Westraltrachia oscarensis
- Westraltrachia pillarana
- Westraltrachia porcata
- Westraltrachia recta
- Westraltrachia rotunda
- Westraltrachia subtila
- Westraltrachia tropida
- Westraltrachia turbinata
- Westraltrachia woodwardi
