= Retroterra =

Scientific classification
- Kingdom: Animalia
- Phylum: Mollusca
- Class: Gastropoda
- Order: Stylommatophora
- Family: Camaenidae
- Subfamily: Hadrinae
- Genus: Retroterra; Solem, 1985

Type species
- Retroterra costa Solem, 1985

Genus of gastropod

Retroterra is a genus of camaenid land snail endemic to Western Australia. The genus was described and established in 1985 by George Alan Solem and contains 8 unique species.

== Distribution ==
Species of this genus are endemic to Australia and occur in Western Australia.

== Species ==
The following eight species are assigned to this genus:

- Retroterra acutocostata (Köhler, 2011)
- Retroterra aequabilis Köhler, 2011
- Retroterra costa (Solem, 1985)
- Retroterra dichroma Criscione & Köhler, 2014
- Retroterra discoidea Köhler, 2011
- Retroterra nana Criscione & Köhler, 2014
- Retroterra parva Solem, 1985
- Retroterra solituda Solem, 1985
