= Kimboraga =

Scientific classification
- Kingdom: Animalia
- Phylum: Mollusca
- Class: Gastropoda
- Order: Stylommatophora
- Family: Camaenidae
- Genus: Kimboraga; Iredale, 1933

Genus of gastropods

Kimboraga is a genus of air-breathing land snails, terrestrial pulmonate gastropod mollusks in the family Camaenidae.

== Species ==
Species within the genus Kimbora include:

- Kimboraga exanima
- Kimboraga koolanensis
- Kimboraga micromphala
- Kimboraga yammerana
