= Glyptorhagada =

Scientific classification
- Kingdom: Animalia
- Phylum: Mollusca
- Class: Gastropoda
- Order: Stylommatophora
- Family: Camaenidae
- Genus: Glyptorhagada; Pilsbry, 1890

Genus of gastropods

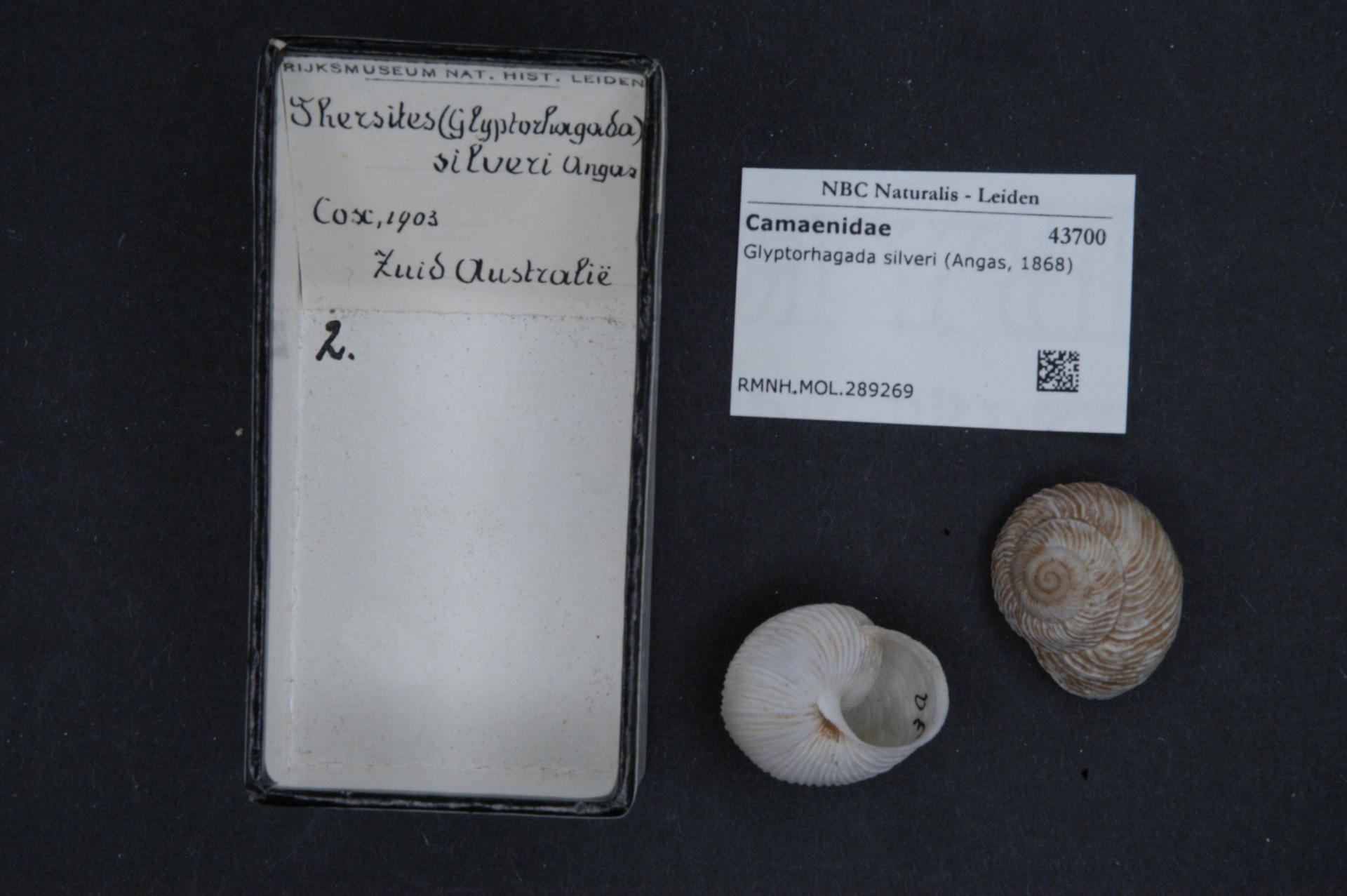
Glyptorhagada silveri shell

Glyptorhagada is a genus of air-breathing land snails, terrestrial pulmonate gastropod mollusks in the family Camaenidae.

== Species ==
Species within the genus Glyptorhagada include:

- Glyptorhagada bordaensis
- Glyptorhagada euglypta
- Glyptorhagada janaslini
- Glyptorhagada kooringensis
- Glyptorhagada silveri
- Glyptorhagada tattawuppana
