= Ptychodon schuppi =

Conservation status
- Endangered (IUCN 2.3)

Scientific classification
- Kingdom: Animalia
- Phylum: Mollusca
- Class: Gastropoda
- Order: Stylommatophora
- Family: Charopidae
- Genus: Ptychodon
- Species: P. schuppi

Binomial name
- Ptychodon schuppi Suter, 1900

Species of gastropod

Ptychodon schuppi is a species of air-breathing land snail, a terrestrial pulmonate gastropod mollusk in the family Charopidae.

== Distribution ==
This species is endemic to Brazil.

== See also ==
- List of non-marine molluscs of Brazil
