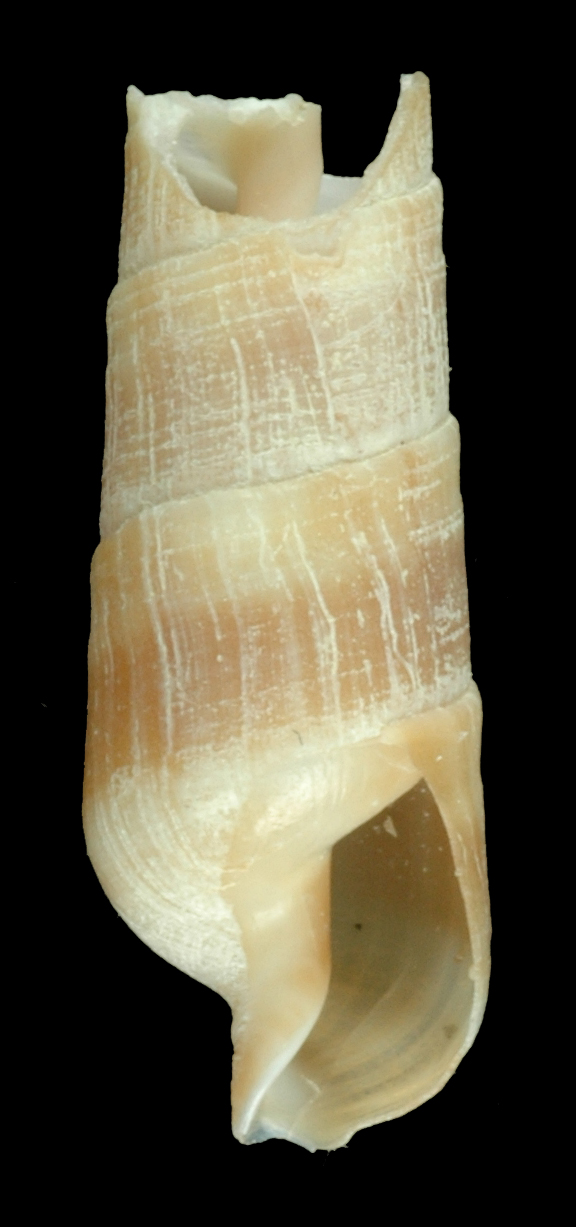
- Shell of Profunditerebra evelynae (specimen at MNHN, Paris)

Scientific classification
- Kingdom: Animalia
- Phylum: Mollusca
- Class: Gastropoda
- Subclass: Caenogastropoda
- Order: Neogastropoda
- Superfamily: Conoidea
- Family: Terebridae
- Genus: Profunditerebra
- Species: P. evelynae

Binomial name
- Profunditerebra evelynae (Clench & Aguayo, 1939)

Synonyms
- Cinguloterebra evelynae (Clench & Aguayo, 1939); Terebra evelynae Clench & Aguayo, 1939 (original combination)

= Profunditerebra evelynae =

Species of gastropod

Profunditerebra evelynae is a species of sea snail, a marine gastropod mollusk in the family Terebridae, the auger snails.

== Distribution ==
This species occurs in the Caribbean Sea off Cuba and Guadeloupe.
