= Glyptorhagada kooringensis =

Conservation status
- Vulnerable (IUCN 2.3)

Scientific classification
- Kingdom: Animalia
- Phylum: Mollusca
- Class: Gastropoda
- Order: Stylommatophora
- Family: Camaenidae
- Genus: Glyptorhagada
- Species: G. kooringensis

Binomial name
- Glyptorhagada kooringensis Angas, 1877

Species of gastropod

Glyptorhagada kooringensis is a species of air-breathing land snails, terrestrial pulmonate gastropod mollusks in the family Camaenidae.

This species is endemic to Australia. Its natural habitat is in grazed, rocky areas. It is threatened by habitat loss due to fire and overgrazing.
