= Atrimitra effusa =

Scientific classification
- Kingdom: Animalia
- Phylum: Mollusca
- Class: Gastropoda
- Subclass: Caenogastropoda
- Order: Neogastropoda
- Family: Mitridae
- Genus: Atrimitra
- Species: A. effusa

Binomial name
- Atrimitra effusa (Broderip, 1836)

Synonyms
- Mitra effusa Broderip, 1836

Species of gastropod

Atrimitra effusa is a species of sea snail, a marine gastropod mollusk in the family Mitridae, the miters or miter snails.
