= Cristilabrum =

Scientific classification
- Kingdom: Animalia
- Phylum: Mollusca
- Class: Gastropoda
- Order: Stylommatophora
- Family: Camaenidae
- Genus: Cristilabrum; Solem, 1981

Genus of gastropods

Cristilabrum is a genus of air-breathing land snail, a terrestrial pulmonate gastropod mollusk in the family Camaenidae.

== Species ==
This genus contains the following species:

- Cristilabrum bubulum
- Cristilabrum buryillum
- Cristilabrum grossum
- Cristilabrum isolatum
- Cristilabrum monodon
- Cristilabrum primum
- Cristilabrum rectum
- Cristilabrum simplex
- Cristilabrum solitudum
- Cristilabrum spectaculum
