= Micromelon =

Scientific classification
- Kingdom: Animalia
- Phylum: Mollusca
- Class: Gastropoda
- Order: Stylommatophora
- Family: Camaenidae
- Genus: Micromelon; Solem, 1992
- Species: M. nepouieanum

Binomial name
- Micromelon nepouieanum Solem, 1992

Species of mollusc

Micromelon nepouieanum is a species of land snail. It is the only species in the genus Micromelon. It was discovered by Alan Solem in 1992 and is found in South Australia.
