= Atrimitra semigranosa =

Scientific classification
- Kingdom: Animalia
- Phylum: Mollusca
- Class: Gastropoda
- Subclass: Caenogastropoda
- Order: Neogastropoda
- Family: Mitridae
- Genus: Atrimitra
- Species: A. semigranosa

Binomial name
- Atrimitra semigranosa (Martens, 1897)

Synonyms
- Mitra semigranosa Martens, 1897

Species of gastropod

Atrimitra semigranosa is a species of sea snail, a marine gastropod mollusk in the family Mitridae, the miters or miter snails.
