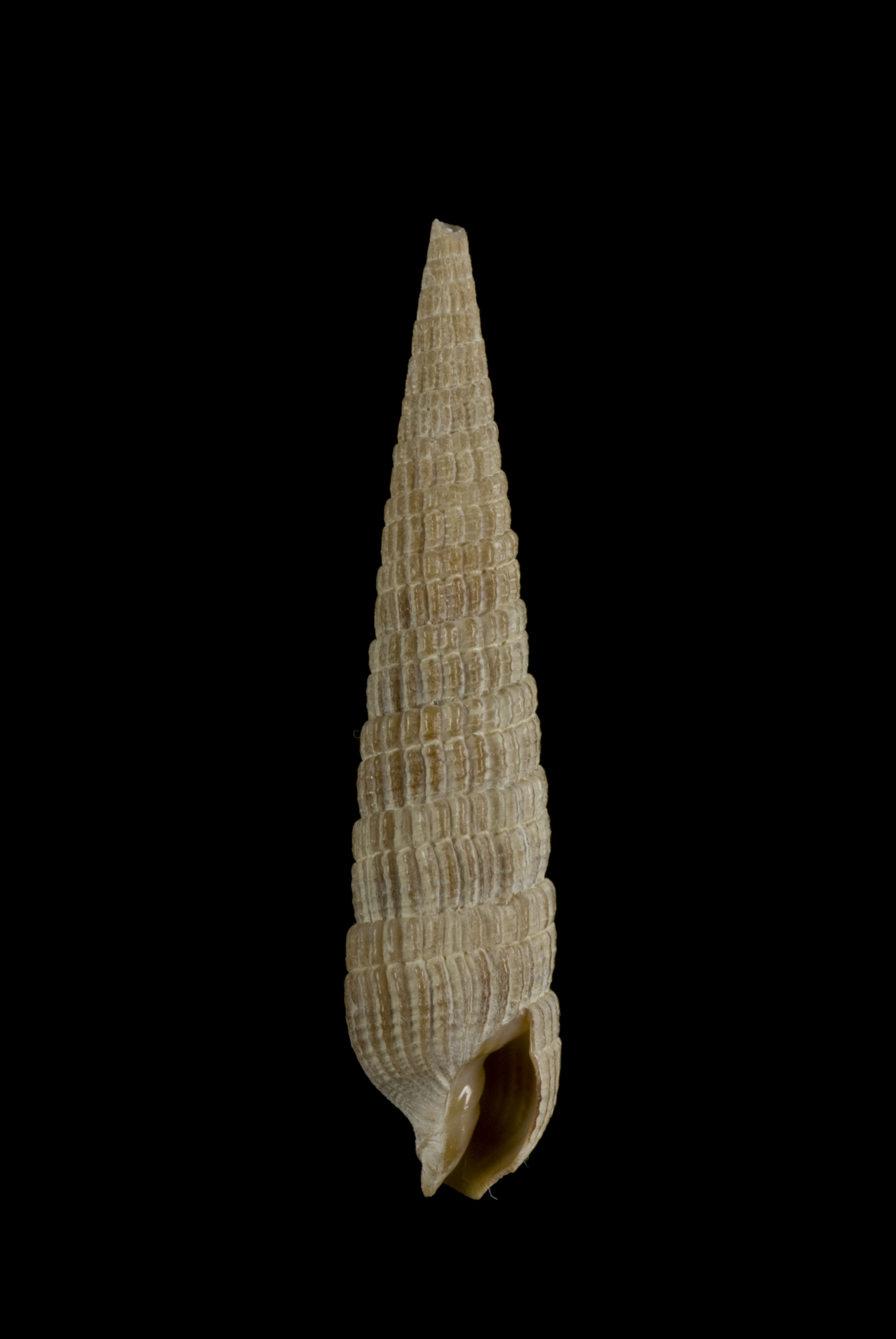
- Shell of Profunditerebra orientalis (specimen at MNHN. Paris)

Scientific classification
- Kingdom: Animalia
- Phylum: Mollusca
- Class: Gastropoda
- Subclass: Caenogastropoda
- Order: Neogastropoda
- Superfamily: Conoidea
- Family: Terebridae
- Genus: Profunditerebra
- Species: P. orientalis

Binomial name
- Profunditerebra orientalis (Aubry, 1999)

Synonyms
- Myurella orientalis (Aubry, 1999); Terebra orientalis Aubry, 1999 (original combination)

= Profunditerebra orientalis =

Species of gastropod

Profunditerebra orientalis is a species of sea snail, a marine gastropod mollusk in the family Terebridae, the auger snails.

== Description ==
The length of the shell attains 35.5 mm.

== Distribution ==
This marine species occurs off New Caledonia and Papua New Guinea.
