= Ptychodon =

Scientific classification
- Kingdom: Animalia
- Phylum: Mollusca
- Class: Gastropoda
- Order: Stylommatophora
- Family: Charopidae
- Genus: Ptychodon; Ancey, 1888

Genus of gastropods

Ptychodon is a genus of small, air-breathing land snails, terrestrial pulmonate gastropod mollusks in the family Charopidae.

== Species ==
Species within the genus Ptychodon include:

- Ptychodon schuppi
