= Cooperconcha =

Scientific classification
- Domain: Eukaryota
- Kingdom: Animalia
- Phylum: Mollusca
- Class: Gastropoda
- Order: Stylommatophora
- Family: Camaenidae
- Genus: Cooperconcha

Genus of gastropods

Cooperconcha is a genus of air-breathing land snails, terrestrial pulmonate gastropod mollusks in the family Camaenidae.

== Species ==
Species within the genus Cooperconcha include:

- Cooperconcha centralis
- Cooperconcha bunyerooana
- Cooperconcha mawsoni
