= Atrimitra orientalis =

Scientific classification
- Kingdom: Animalia
- Phylum: Mollusca
- Class: Gastropoda
- Subclass: Caenogastropoda
- Order: Neogastropoda
- Family: Mitridae
- Genus: Atrimitra
- Species: A. orientalis

Binomial name
- Atrimitra orientalis (Gray, 1834)

Synonyms
- Mitra orientalis Gray, 1834

Species of gastropod

Atrimitra orientalis is a species of sea snail, a marine gastropod mollusk in the family Mitridae, the miters or miter snails.
