= Alan Solem =

American biologist

- Born: George Alan Solem; June 21, 1931; United States
- Died: March 26, 1990 (aged 58)
- Known for: One of the most renowned land snail experts of his time
- Scientific career
- Fields: Malacology
- Author abbrev. (zoology): Solem

George Alan Solem (21 June 1931 – 26 March 1990), known professionally as Alan Solem, was an American malacologist, a biologist who studied mollusks.

He was one of the most renowned land snail experts of his time and had earned a reputation for his comprehensive revisions of mainly terrestrial pulmonates. He worked on land snails from all regions of the world but became particularly known for his revisions of land snails from Australasia and various Pacific Islands. His 140 academic papers dealt with the snail phylogeny, feeding patterns and reproductive strategies.

He named many taxa, amongst them about 350 species of Australian land snails, and several genera. Some species named by him are:

- Ba humbugi Solem, 1983 – a species of Fijian land snail
- Hadra wilsoni Solem, 1979 – a species of Western Australian land snail
- Glyptorhagada janaslini Solem, 1992 – a species of land snail
- Aaadonta fuscozonata depressa Solem, 1976 – a subspecies of land snail

== Taxa described by Solem ==
- Aslintesta Solem, 1992
- Caperantrum Solem, 1997
- Carinotrachia Solem, 1985
- Cooperconcha Solem, 1992
- Cristilabrum Solem, 1981
- Falspleuroxia Solem, 1997
- Kendrickia Solem, 1985
- Melostrachia Solem, 1979
- Mesodontrachia Solem, 1985
- Micromelon Solem, 1992
- Minimelon Solem, 1993
- Montanomelon Solem, 1993
- Mouldingia Solem, 1984
- Ningbingia Solem, 1981
- Orangia Solem, 1976
- Ordtrachia Solem, 1984
- Promonturconchum Solem, 1997
- Prototrachia Solem, 1984
- Prymnbriareus Solem, 1981
- Pseudcupedora Solem, 1992
- Retroterra Solem, 1985
- Strepsitaurus Solem, 1997
- Tatemelon Solem, 1993
- Turgenitubulus Solem, 1981
- Vatusila Solem, 1983

== Bibliography ==
- Solem, A. 1955. Mexican molluscs collected for Dr. Bryant Walker in 1926. XI. Drymaeus. Occasional Papers of the Museum of Zoology, University of Michigan 566: 1–20 pp., pl. 21–25.
- Solem, A. 1956. The helicoid cyclophorid mollusks of Mexico. Proceedings of the Academy of Natural Sciences of Philadelphia 108: 41-59, pl. 45, 46.
- Solem, A. 1957. Philippine Zoological Expedition 1946-1947. Philippine snails of the family Endodontidae. Fieldiana Zoology 41: 1-12.
- Solem, A. 1958. Endodontide Landschnecken von Indonesien und Neu Guinea. Archiv für Molluskenkunde 87: 19-26.
- Solem, A. 1959. Notes on Mexican mollusks. II. Occasional Papers of the Museum of Zoology, University of Michigan 611: 15 pp.
- Solem, A. 1961. New Caledonian land and fresh-water snails. An annotated check list. Fieldiana: Zoology 41(3): 415–501.
- Laidlaw, F.F., Solem, A. 1961. The land snail genus Amphidromus. A syntopic catalogue. Fieldiana Zoology 41: 506-677.
- Solem, A. 1964. A collection of non-marine molluscs from Sabah. Sabah Society Journal 11: 1-40.
- Solem, A. 1966. Some non-marine mollusks from Thailand, with notes on classification of the Helicarionidae. Spolia Zoologica Musei Hauniensis 24: 1-110.
- Solem, A. 1968. "Ptychodon" misoolensis Adam and Van Benthem Jutting, 1939, A New Guinea Strobilopsis land snail and review of the genus Enteroplax. Veliger 11: 24-30.
- Solem, A. 1974. The shell makers: introducing mollusks. New York: John Wiley & Sons. xiv + 289 pp.
- Solem, A. 1975. Notes on Salmon River oreohelicid land snails, with description of Oreohelix waltoni. The Veliger 18(1): 16-30.
- Solem, A. 1975. Polygyriscus virginianus (Burch, 1947) a helicodiscid land snail (Pulmonata: Helicodiscidae). The Nautilus 89(3): 80–86.
- Solem, A. 1976. Comments on eastern North American Polygyridae. The Nautilus 90(1): 25-36.
- Solem, A. 1976. Endodontoid land snails from Pacific islands (Mollusca: Pulmonata: Sigmurethra). Part I, Family Endodontidae. Chicago, Illinois: Field Museum of Natural History. i-xii, 1-508 pp.
- Solem, A. 1976. Species criteria in Anguispira (Anguispira) (Pulmonata: Discidae). The Nautilus 90(1): 15–23.
- Solem, A. 1977. Radiodiscus hubrichti Branson, 1975, a synonym of Striatura pugetensis (Dall, 1895) (Pulmonata: Zonitidae). The Nautilus 91(4): 146-148.
- Solem, A. 1977. Shell microsculpture in Striatura, Punctum, Radiodiscus, and Planogyra (Pulmonata). The Nautilus 91(4): 149-155.
- Solem, A. 1978. Cretaceous and Early Tertiary camaenid land snails from Western North America (Mollusca: Pulmonata). Journal of Paleontology 52: 581-589.
- Solem, A., Yochelson, E.L. 1979. North American Palaeozoic land snails, with a summary of other Palaeozoic non-marine snails. United States Geological Survey, Professional Paper 1072: 1-42.
- Solem, A. 1979. "Some mollusks from Afghanistan". Fieldiana Zoology new series 1: 1-89.
- Solem, A. 1979. Camaenid land snails from Western and central Australia (Mollusca: Pulmonata: Camaenidae). I. Taxa with trans-Australian distribution. Records of the Western Australian Museum Suppl. 10: 5-142.
- Solem, A., van der Spoel, S. Van Bruggen, A.C., Lever, J. 1979. A theory of land snail biogeographic patterns through time. In: Pathways in Malacology. Utrecht: Scheltema & Holkema.
- Solem, A. 1981. Camaenid land snails from Western and central Australia (Mollusca: Pulmonata: Camaenidae). II. Taxa from the Kimberley, Amplirhagada Iredale 1933. Records of the Western Australian Museum Suppl. 11: 147-320.
- Solem, A. 1981. Camaenid land snails from Western and central Australia (Mollusca: Pulmonata: Camaenidae). III. Taxa from the Ningbing Ranges and nearby areas. Records of the Western Australian Museum Suppl. 11: 321-425.
- Solem, A., W.K. Emerson, B. Roth and F.G. Thompson. 1981. Standards for malacological collections. Curator 24(1): 19-28.
- Solem A. (7 January 1983) "Endodontoid land snails from Pacific Islands (Mollusca: Pulmonata: Sigmurethra). Part II. Families Punctidae and Charopidae, Zoogeography". Fieldiana Zoology, Field Museum of Natural History, Chicago, ISSN 0015-0754.
- Solem, A., Tillier, A., Mordan, P. 1984. Pseudo-operculate pulmonate land snails from New Caledonia. Veliger 27: 193-199.
- Solem, A., Christensen, C. 1984. Camaenid land snail reproductive cycle and growth patterns in semiarid area of north-western Australia. Australian Journal of Zoology 32: 471-491.
- Solem, A. 1984. Camaenid land snails from Western and central Australia (Mollusca: Pulmonata: Camaenidae). IV. Taxa from the Kimberley, Westraltrachia Iredale, 1933 and related genera. Records of the Western Australian Museum Suppl. 17: 427-705.
- Solem, A. 1985. Simultaneous character convergence and divergence in Western Australian land snails. Biological Journal of the Linnean Society 24: 143-136.
- Solem, A. 1985. Camaenid land snails from Western and central Australia (Mollusca: Pulmonata: Camaenidae). V. Remaining Kimberley genera and addenda to the Kimberley. Records of the Western Australian Museum Suppl. 20: 707-981.
- Solem, A. 1988. New camaenid land snails from the northeast Kimberley, Western Australia. Journal of the Malacological Society of Australia 9: 27-58.
- Solem, A. 1988. Maximum in the minimum: Biogeography of land snails from the Ningbing Ranges and Jeremiah Hills, northeast Kimberley, Western Australia. Journal of the Malacological Society of Australia 9: 59-113.
- Solem, A. 1989. Non-camaenid land snails of the Kimberley and Northern Territory, Australia. I. Affinities and ranges. Invertebrate Taxonomy 2: 455-604.
- Solem, A. 1991. Land snails of Kimberley rainforest patches and biogeography of all Kimberley landsnails. In: McKenzie, N.L., Johnston, R.B., Kendrick, P.G. (eds), Kimberley rainforests of Australia. Canberra: Surrey Beatty & Sons and Department of Conservation and Land Management Western Australia.
- Solem, A., McKenzie, N.L, 1991. The composition of land snail assemblages in Kimberley rainforests. In: McKenzie, N.L., Johnston, R.B., Kendrick, P.G. (eds), Kimberley rainforests of Australia. Canberra: Surrey Beatty & Sons and Department of Conservation and Land Management Western Australia.
- Solem, A. 1991. The next challenge: Life styles and evolution. American Malacological Bulletin 8(2): 173-175.
- Solem, A. 1992. Camaenid land snails from southern and eastern Australia, excluding Kangaroo Island. Records of the South Australian Museum, Monogr.Ser. 2: 1-425.
- Solem, A. 1993. Camaenid land snails from Western and central Australia (Mollusca: Pulmonata: Camaenidae). VI. Taxa from the Red Centre. Records of the Western Australian Museum Suppl. 43: 983-1489.
- Solem, A. 1997. Camaenid land snails from Western and central Australia (Mollusca: Pulmonata: Camaenidae). VII. Taxa from Dampierland through the Nullarbor. Records of the Western Australian Museum Suppl. 50: 1461-1906.
- Solem, A. 1998. Family Camaenidae. In: Beesley, P.L., Ross, G.J.B., Wells, A. (eds), Mollusca: The Southern Synthesis. Melbourne: CSIRO Publishing.
