= Kočevje subterranean spider =

At least three species share the name Kočevje subterranean spider:

- Troglohyphantes gracilis
- Troglohyphantes similis
- Troglohyphantes spinipes
