= Štalcerji =

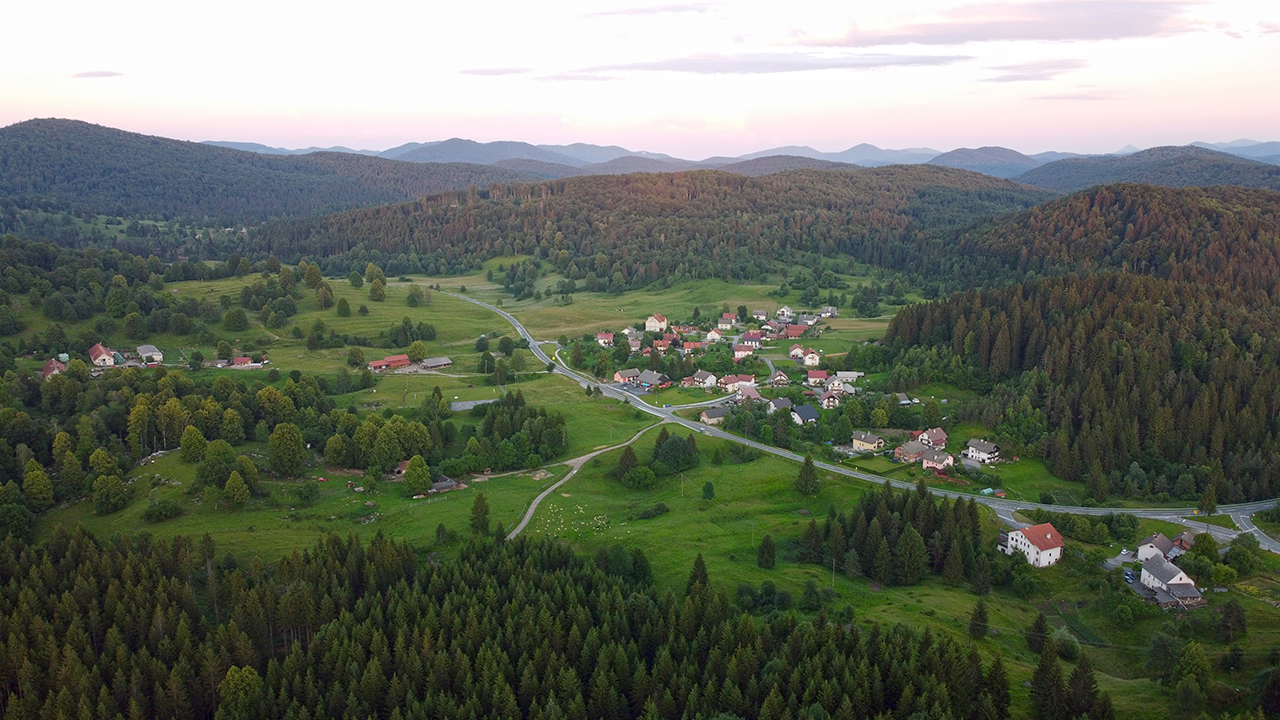

- Location in Slovenia
- Coordinates: 45°34′16.54″N 14°52′25.15″E
- Country: Slovenia
- Traditional region: Lower Carniola
- Statistical region: Southeast Slovenia
- Municipality: Kočevje

Area
  - Total: 6.68 km^{2} (2.58 sq mi)
- Elevation: 518.7 m (1,702 ft)

Population (2002)
  - Total: 187
- Postal code: 1338

Štalcerji (pronounced [ˈʃtaːlcɛɾji] or [ˈʃtaːu̯cɛɾji]; previously also Štalcarji, German: Stalzern) is a settlement in the hills south of the town of Kočevje in southern Slovenia. It was a village inhabited partly by Gottschee Germans. In 1941 at the start of the Second World War its original population was expelled. The area is part of the traditional region of Lower Carniola and is now included in the Southeast Slovenia Statistical Region. It includes the hamlet of Jelenja Vas.

The local church, dedicated to Saint Anthony the Great, is mentioned in written documents dating to 1526. During the Second World War it was damaged and after the war the ruins were demolished and removed.
