= Hutterhäuser =

Hutterhäuser Huterhaiser
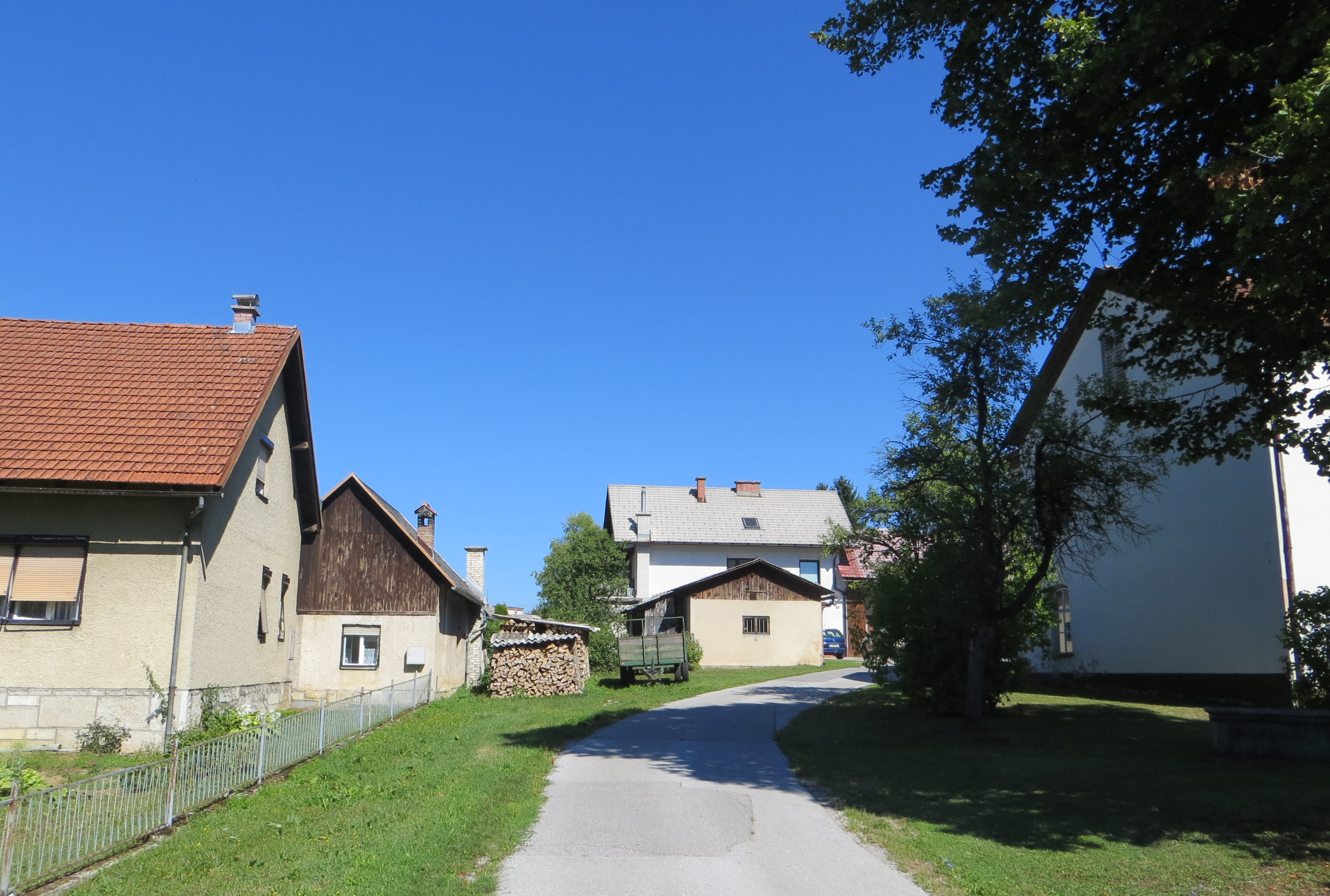
- Hutterhäuser, now part of Kočevje

- Location in Slovenia
- Coordinates: 45°38′45″N 14°51′12″E
- Country: Slovenia
- Traditional region: Lower Carniola
- Statistical region: Southeast Slovenia
- Municipality: Kočevje

Hutterhäuser (Slovene: Huterhaiser) is a former village in the Municipality of Kočevje in southern Slovenia. The area is part of the traditional region of Lower Carniola and is now included in the Southeast Slovenia Statistical Region. Its territory is now part of the town of Kočevje.

== History ==
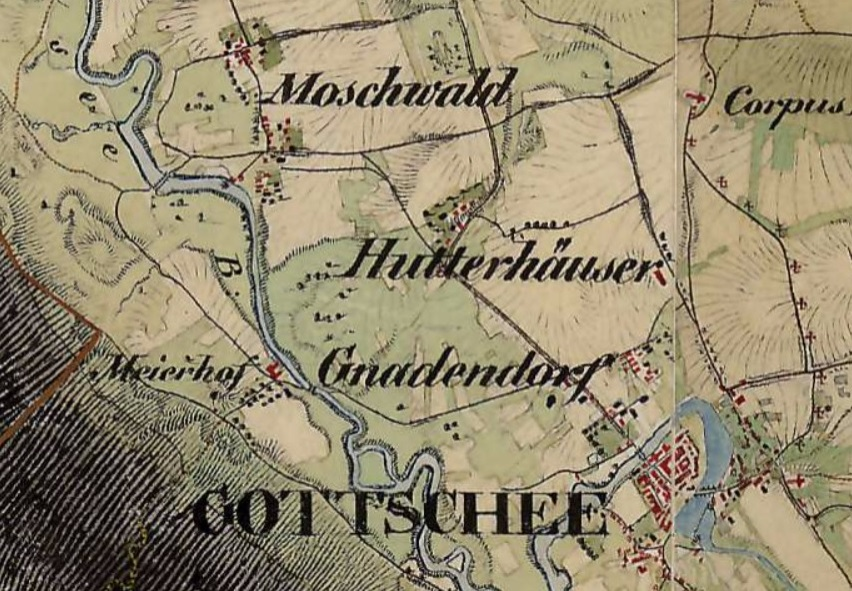
Map showing Hutterhäuser, c. 1830

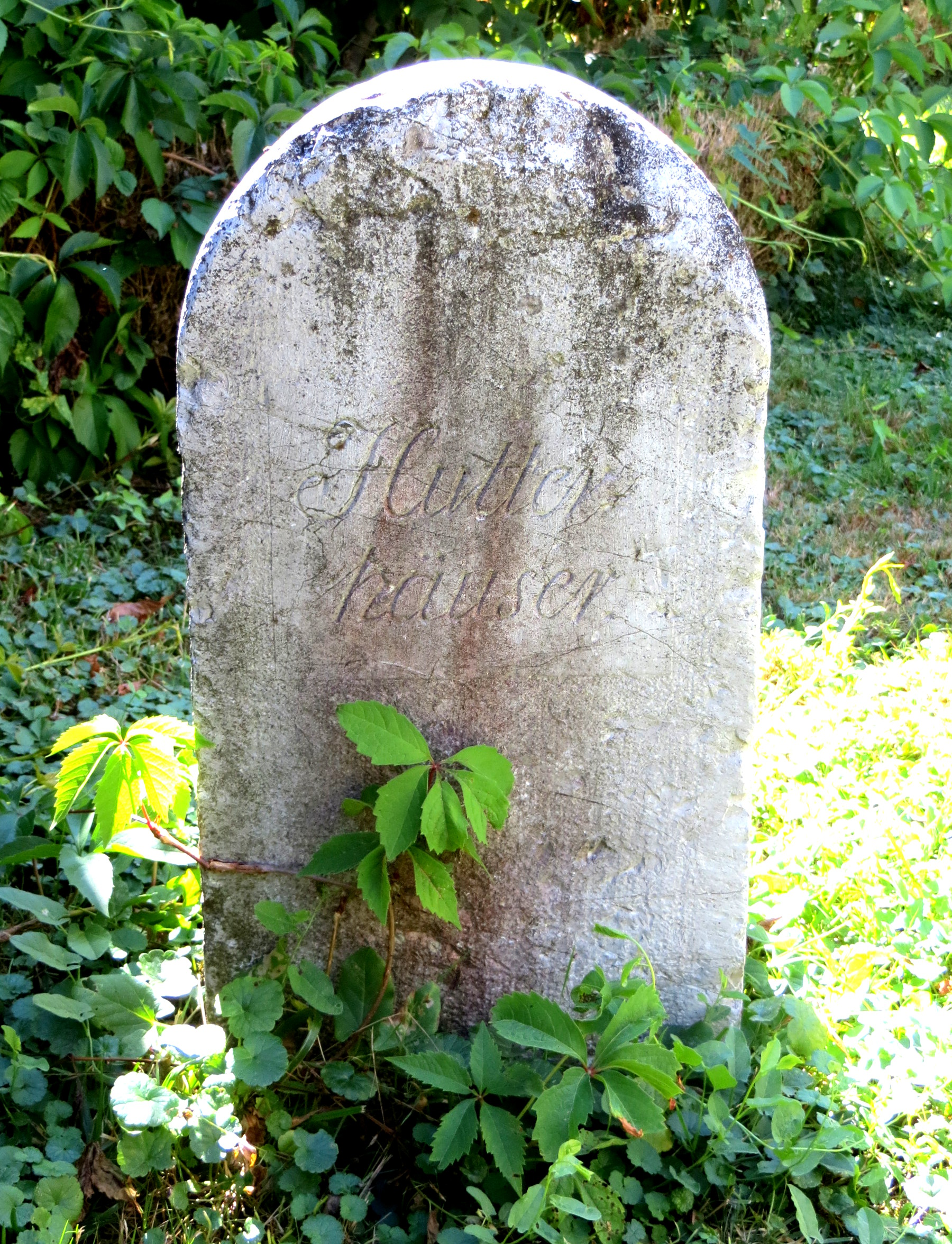
Stone marker for Hutterhäuser

The Slovene name Huterhaiser was published alongside the German name Hutterhäuser in the 1869 census, but subsequent censuses used only the German name of the settlement. In the 1869 census, the village had six houses and a population of 28. In the 1880 census, the village had five houses and a population of 37, which was 78% German-speaking. By the early 1890s, it was already forming a continuous conurbation with Kočevje as a result of growth spurred by the arrival of the railroad in 1893. A brewery was located in the village. Together with neighboring Gnadendorf, Hutterhäuser was annexed by Kočevje in 1896.
