= Gnadendorf, Kočevje =

Gnadendorf
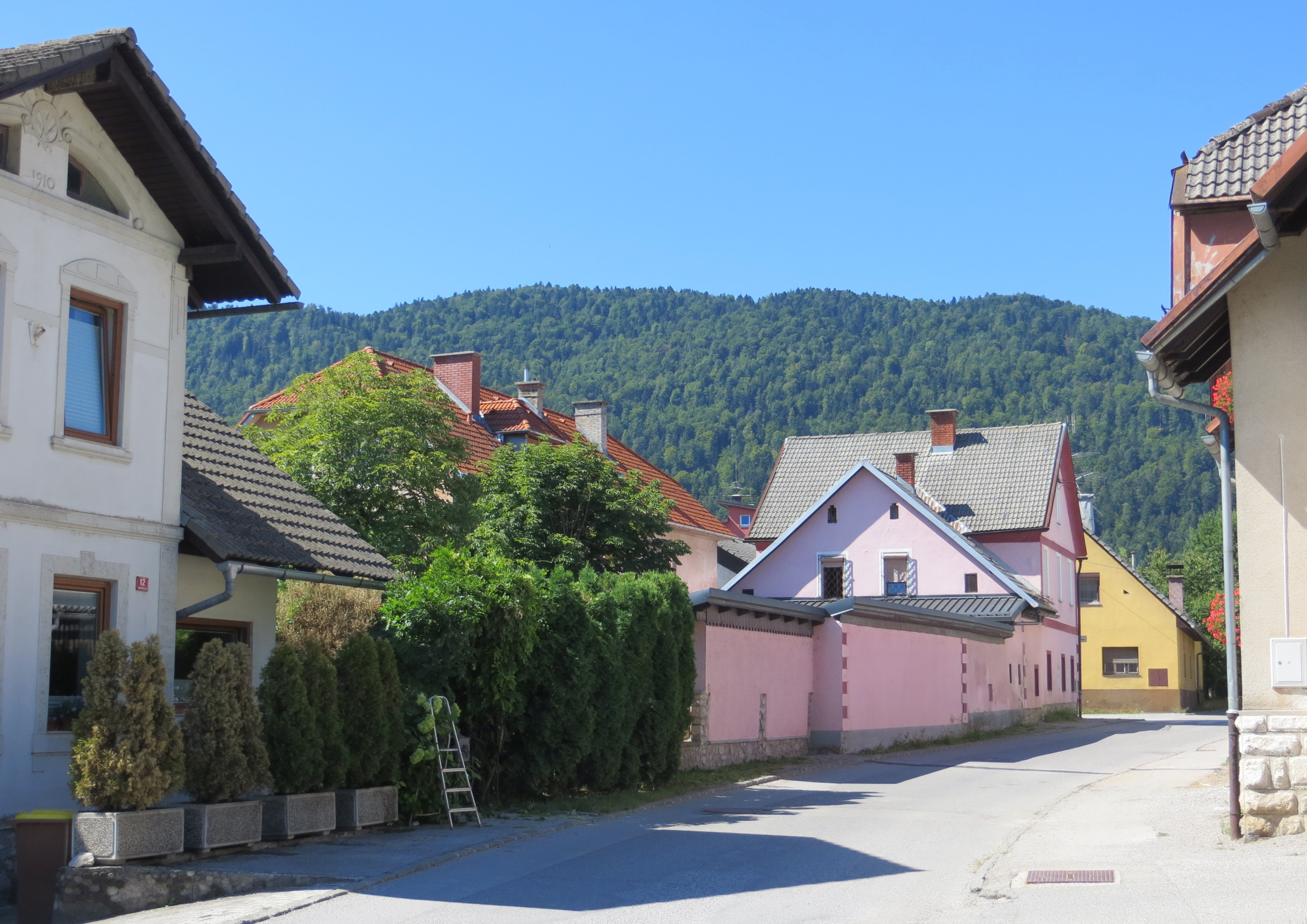
- Gnadendorf, now part of Kočevje

- Location in Slovenia
- Coordinates: 45°38′33″N 14°51′33″E
- Country: Slovenia
- Traditional region: Lower Carniola
- Statistical region: Southeast Slovenia
- Municipality: Kočevje

Gnadendorf (Gottschee German: Gnoudndoarf, Gnoudndaf) is a former village in the Municipality of Kočevje in southern Slovenia. The area is part of the traditional region of Lower Carniola and is now included in the Southeast Slovenia Statistical Region. Its territory is now part of the town of Kočevje.

== History ==
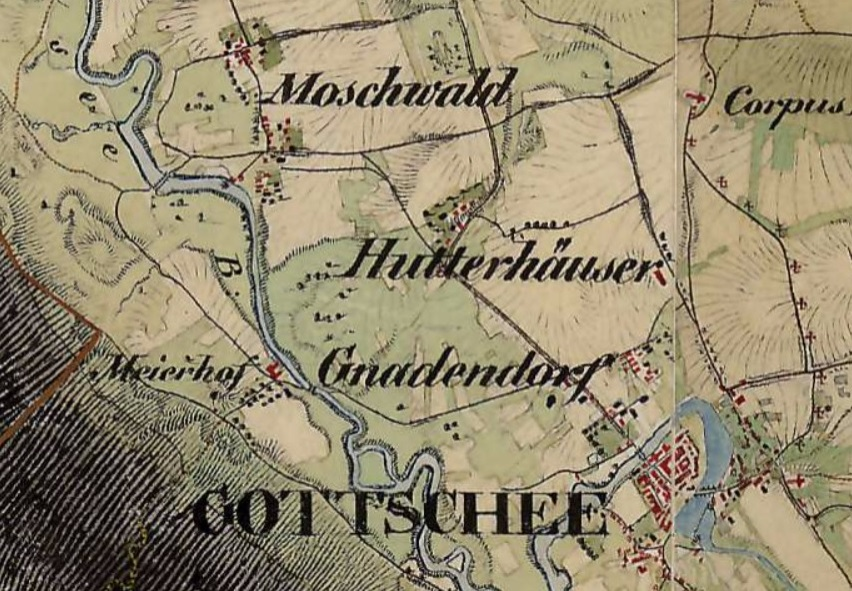
Map showing Gnadendorf, c. 1830

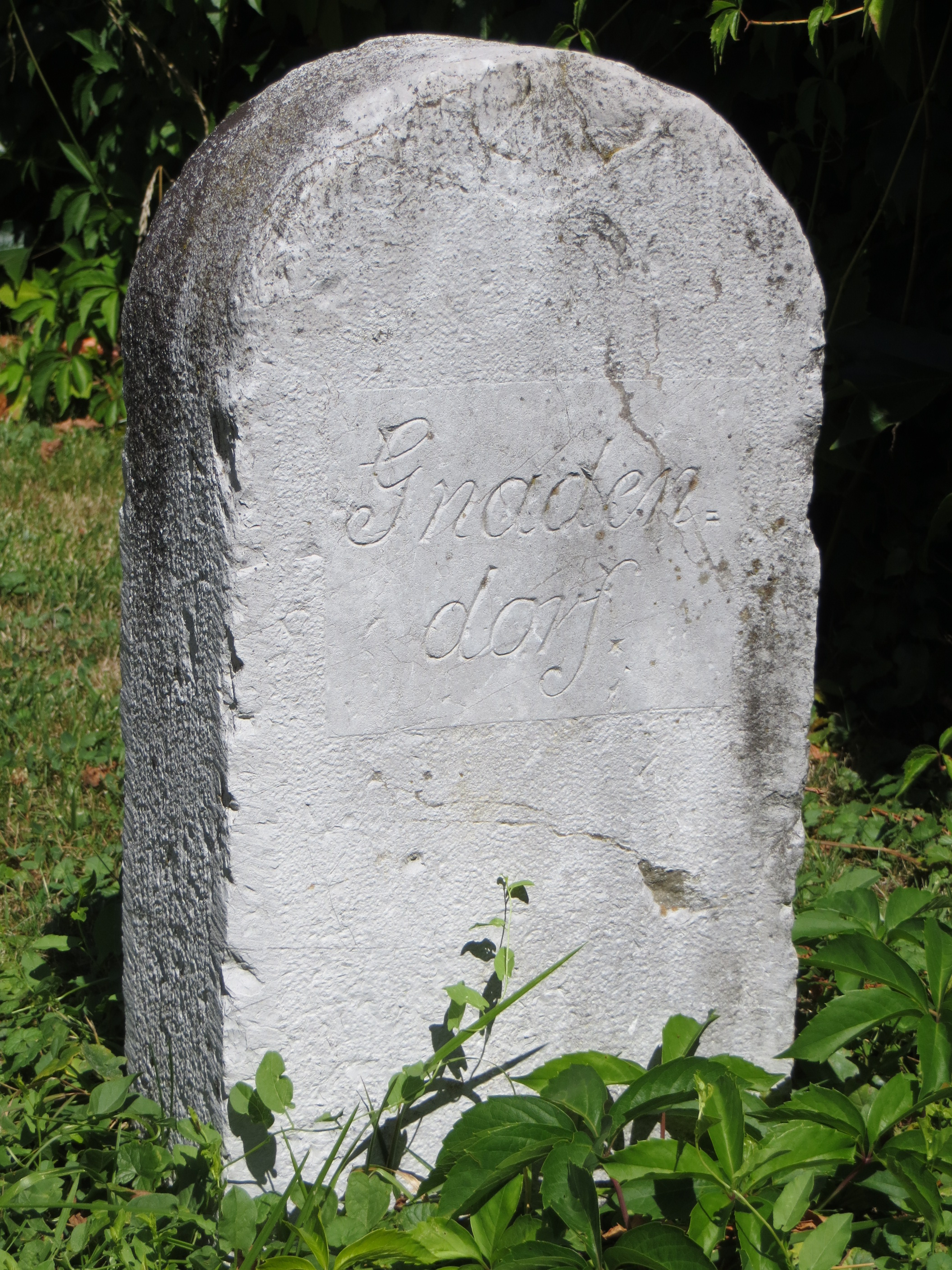
Stone marker for Gnadendorf

The village of Gnadendorf did not have a Slovene name. In the 1880 census, the village had 17 houses and a population of 135, which was 95% German-speaking. In 1894, Gnadendorf had a lower secondary school, hospital, and orphanage, and it already formed a continuous conurbation with Kočevje as a result of growth spurred by the arrival of the railroad in 1893. Together with neighboring Hutterhäuser, Gnadendorf was annexed by Kočevje in 1896.
