= Troglohyphantes nigraerosae =

Scientific classification
- Kingdom: Animalia
- Phylum: Arthropoda
- Subphylum: Chelicerata
- Class: Arachnida
- Order: Araneae
- Infraorder: Araneomorphae
- Family: Linyphiidae
- Genus: Troglohyphantes
- Species: T. nigraerosae

Binomial name
- Troglohyphantes nigraerosae Brignoli, 1971

Species of spider

Troglohyphantes nigraerosae is a species of cave spider of the family Linyphiidae. It is endemic to Italy.

== Morphology ==
Troglohyphantes nigraerosae is a small sized cave spider with a body length of 3 mm (Prosoma length: 1.50 mm, prosoma width: 1.15 mm). From a genetic standpoint, T. nigrerosae represent the sister group of T. vignai. Males of the latter species can be distinguished from T. nigraerosae by the shape of the lamella significativa of the male palp (see).

== Distribution ==
Southern Graian Alps (NW Italy). The species occurs preferentially in caves.
