= Roman Erich Petsche =

Austrian teacher and painter (1907–1993)

- Born: 3 February 1907; Gottschee, Austria-Hungary (now Kočevje, Slovenia)
- Died: 20 June 1993 (aged 86); Ried im Innkreis, Austria
- Education: Academy of Fine Arts Vienna
- Awards: Righteous Among the Nations
- Military career
- Allegiance: Nazi Germany
- Branch: Wehrmacht
- Rank: Lieutenant

Roman Erich Petsche (3 February 1907 – 20 June 1993) was an Austrian teacher, painter, and Wehrmacht officer who is recognized as Righteous Among the Nations by Yad Vashem for aiding a Jewish family in Novi Sad.

== Biography ==
Roman Erich Petsche was born on 3 February 1907 in the city of Gottschee and he grew up in Ljubljana, both then part of Austria-Hungary. His father was a German-speaking teacher, while his mother was part of the Galician aristocracy, with Petsche later describing her as a "nationality aware Pole". His family was expelled from Slovenia in 1918 and moved to Salzburg in Austria proper. After graduating from high school in Salzburg in 1925, Petsche began attending the Academy of Fine Arts Vienna, where he studied under Rudolf Jettmar and Wilhelm Müller-Hofmann. After passing his teacher's examinations in 1929, he worked as a drawing teacher in Salzburg until 1931; a mathematics teacher in Ried im Innkreis from 1931 until 1933; and then at the teacher training college in Sankt Pölten.

During World War II, he was commissioned as a lieutenant in the Wehrmacht and was stationed in the occupied Yugoslav city of Novi Sad in March 1944. While in the city, he quartered with the family of Dr. Tibor Czarney, a lawyer and one of the city's Jewish leaders; Czarney had been captured while trying to flee to Hungary and has since been missing, but his wife and twin five-year-old daughters remained.

After learning that the city's remaining Jewish population would be deported to Auschwitz concentration camp on 25 March 1944, Petsche decided to save Czarney's family. Passing off the twins as his daughters and their nursemaid as his wife, he drove them to Budapest, where they were hidden in a convent. He then returned to Novi Sad to take care of Czarney's wife Vera and her sister Olga, who were to be deported that night. Petsche's plan was for the two women to jump off the deportation train as it slowed for a switch near Vienna and then travel on foot to his home, where his wife was expecting them. However, they did not jump from the train and were taken to Auschwitz, where Vera was killed. Petsche also took care of Vera's infirm mother, transferring her to a hospital in Novi Sad and visiting her regularly until her death. Olga and the twins survived the Holocaust, and later moved to Israel. On 3 May 1982, Petsche was recognized as Righteous Among the Nations by Yad Vashem for his actions in aiding the family. He later stated that he saved the family due to "the self-evident human command to help others in need", and was also aware of that several members of his mother's family were killed in concentration camps.

After the war, Petsche worked in Linz as a teaching instructor from 1945 to 1950. He also worked as an inspector for the provincial school boards of Upper Austria, Lower Austria, and Burgenland, until his retirement in 1972.

Petsche was also active as a painter, though he never sold his paintings on the art market. He preferred figurative motifs, which he almost exclusively created in a headstrong collage technique made out of colourful chalk drawings and light prints, that he called "Lumigraphie". Museums in Ried im Innkreis and Graz, among others, still display his art. At the 11th Braunauer Zeitgeschichte-Tage in Kultur im Gugg in 2002, his paintings were shown in combination with the themes civil courage and resistance to dictatorships.

Petsche died on 20 June 1993 in Ried im Innkreis.
