= Troglohyphantes spinipes =

Conservation status
- Vulnerable (IUCN 2.3)

Scientific classification
- Kingdom: Animalia
- Phylum: Arthropoda
- Subphylum: Chelicerata
- Class: Arachnida
- Order: Araneae
- Infraorder: Araneomorphae
- Family: Linyphiidae
- Genus: Troglohyphantes
- Species: T. spinipes

Binomial name
- Troglohyphantes spinipes Fage, 1919

Species of spider

Troglohyphantes spinipes is a species of spider in the family Linyphiidae that is endemic to Slovenia, living in caves in the Kočevje mountains. It is a relatively small spider, between 3.6 and 3.9 mm (0.14 and 0.15 in) in length. The male is smaller than the female. It has a fawn-reddish cephalothorax, brownish sternum and white abdomen. The species is one of three, alongside Troglohyphantes similis and Troglohyphantes gracilis, sometimes referred to as the Kočevje subterranean spider, which are found in contiguous ranges.

== Taxonomy ==
Troglohyphantes spinipes is a species of sheet weaver spiders, members of the family Linyphiidae, that was first described by Louis Fage in 1919. He allocated the species to the genus Troglohyphantes, which had been circumscribed by Gustav Joseph in 1881. The genus has specialised in living in caves, with reduced vision, some species losing their eyes, and slower development. It is a member of a group called croaticus within the genus, which is itself part of the subgenus Troglohyphantes.

== Description ==
Like all the members of the genus, Troglohyphantes spinipes is a relatively small spider. The female has a typical body length of 3.9 mm (0.15 in). Its cephalothorax is a dark reddish oval that is between 1.44 and 1.49 mm (0.057 and 0.059 in) long and typically 1.34 mm (0.053 in) wide with a nearly flat top. Its mouthparts are also fawn-reddish, although its labium is brownish, similar to the underside of the cephalothorax. Its sternum, or underside of the cephalothorax, is sooty-grey. Its abdomen is dark and marked with five light arrow-shaped bars. The spider's epigyne, the external and most visible of its copulatory organs, is similar to Troglohyphantes similis, but the lower ridge does not have an indentation in the middle.

The male is similar to the female, although it is smaller, typically 3.6 mm (0.14 in) in length. Its cephalothorax is also smaller, typically 1.44 mm (0.057 in) long and typically 1.2 mm (0.047 in) wide. Its copulatory organs are similar to related species but differ in particulars. There is a cup-sharped depression in the upper half of the cymbium with a thumb-shaped projection visible above a triangle-shaped plate near the bottom. The palpal bulb has a number of projections, or apophyses, that project from the bulb. Its embolus is typically 0.37 mm (0.015 in) long.

== Distribution and habitat ==
Most Troglohyphantes species live in the mountain ranges of Europe including the Pyrenees, Alps, Dinarides and Carpathians, usually in subterranean environments or caves. Troglohyphantes spinipes lives caves in the Kočevje mountains of Slovenia. Troglohyphantes similis, Troglohyphantes gracilis and this species are very closely related with ranges that are contiguous. The three species are all referred to as the Kočevje subterranean spider. The species is at risk of climate change reducing its habitat.
