= Troglohyphantes gracilis =

Conservation status
- Vulnerable (IUCN 2.3)

Scientific classification
- Kingdom: Animalia
- Phylum: Arthropoda
- Subphylum: Chelicerata
- Class: Arachnida
- Order: Araneae
- Infraorder: Araneomorphae
- Family: Linyphiidae
- Genus: Troglohyphantes
- Species: T. gracilis

Binomial name
- Troglohyphantes gracilis Fage, 1919

Species of spider

Troglohyphantes gracilis is a species of spider in the family Linyphiidae that is endemic to Slovenia, living in caves in the Kočevje mountains. It is a relatively small spider, between 2.98 and 3.2 mm (0.117 and 0.126 in) in length. It is generally reddish-orange with a pattern of arrow-shaped lines on its abdomen. The species is one of three, alongside Troglohyphantes similis and Troglohyphantes spinipes that are found in contiguous ranges, which are sometimes referred to as the Kočevje subterranean spider. It can be distinguished from its relatives by its copulatory organs, including the shape of the female's epigyne and the presence of a short straight projection, or apophysis, on the male's palpal bulb.

== Taxonomy ==
Troglohyphantes gracilis is a species of sheet weaver spiders, members of the family Linyphiidae, that was first described by Louis Fage in 1919. He allocated the species to the genus Troglohyphantes, which had been circumscribed by Gustav Joseph in 1881. The genus has specialised in living in caves, with reduced vision, some species losing their eyes, and slower development. It is a member of a group called croaticus within the genus, which is itself part of the subgenus Troglohyphantes.

== Description ==
Like all the members of the genus, Troglohyphantes gracilis is a relatively small spider. The female has a body length between 2.98 and 3.2 mm (0.117 and 0.126 in) and a cephalothorax 1.34 and 1.44 mm (0.053 and 0.057 in) long and between 1.06 and 1.2 mm (0.042 and 0.047 in) wide. It is very similar in shape to Troglohyphantes similis. The spider is reddish-orange, similar to Troglohyphantes spinipes, but it is lighter. The pattern on the top, which consists of five light arrow-shaped lines on the spider's abdomen, is also lighter. The spider's epigyne, the external and most visible of its copulatory organs, is similar to Troglohyphantes spinipes, but it is not as wide.

The male is similar to the female, typically 3.12 mm (0.123 in) in length. Its cephalothorax is generally smaller, typically 1.34 mm long and 1.2 mm (0.047 in) wide. It has multiple spines on its legs, incljuding five on the tibia. Its palpal bulb is similar to the related Troglohyphantes spinipes but the species differ in the existence of a shorter and straighter projection, or apophysis, that projects from the palpal bulb and differences in the shape of the lamella.

== Distribution and habitat ==
Most Troglohyphantes species live in the mountain ranges of Europe including the Pyrenees, Alps, Dinarides and Carpathians, usually in subterranean environments or caves. Troglohyphantes gracilis lives in three caves in the Kočevje mountains of Lower Carniola, Slovenia. Troglohyphantes similis, Troglohyphantes spinipes and this species are very closely related with ranges that are contiguous. The three species are all referred to as the Kočevje subterranean spider. The species is at risk of climate change reducing its habitat.
