= Troglohyphantes similis =

Conservation status
- Vulnerable (IUCN 2.3)

Scientific classification
- Kingdom: Animalia
- Phylum: Arthropoda
- Subphylum: Chelicerata
- Class: Arachnida
- Order: Araneae
- Infraorder: Araneomorphae
- Family: Linyphiidae
- Genus: Troglohyphantes
- Species: T. similis

Binomial name
- Troglohyphantes similis Fage, 1919

Species of spider

Troglohyphantes similis is a species of spider in the family Linyphiidae that is endemic to Slovenia, living in caves in the Kočevje mountains. It is a relatively small spider, typically 2.5 mm (0.098 in) in length. It has a fawn-reddish cephalothorax, brownish sternum and white abdomen. The species is one of three, alongside Troglohyphantes spinipes and Troglohyphantes gracilis, which are found in contiguous ranges and are sometimes referred to as the Kočevje subterranean spider. It can be distinguished from these relatives by its smaller size and smaller legs.

== Taxonomy ==
Troglohyphantes similis is a species of sheet weaver spiders, members of the family Linyphiidae, that was first described by Louis Fage in 1919. He allocated the species to the genus Troglohyphantes, which had been circumscribed by Gustav Joseph in 1881. The genus has specialised in living in caves, with reduced vision, some species losing their eyes, and slower development. It is a member of a group called croaticus within the genus, which is itself part of the subgenus Troglohyphantes.

== Description ==
Like all the members of the genus, Troglohyphantes similis is a relatively small spider. The female has a typical body length of 2.5 mm (0.098 in). Its cephalothorax is a fawn-reddish oval that is typically 1.46 mm (0.057 in) long with a nearly flat top. Its mouthparts are also fawn-reddish, although its labium is brownish, similar to the underside of the cephalothorax. Its sternum is also brownish and has fine hairy granulations. Its abdomen is white with a brown tinge to the back. The spider's epigyne, the external and most visible of its copulatory organs, is similar to Troglohyphantes excavatus, but the lower ridge does not have an indentation in the middle. It is identical to It can be most easily distinguished from related species by its smaller size, smaller legs and fewer spines.

The male has a similar cephalothorax to the female but is easier to differentiate from other species. The shape of its pedipalps is particularly distinctive in its shape, with some sections having a characteristic curved shape. Its palpal bulb is similar to the related Troglohyphantes excavaius but differs in the shape of the lamella, of spike that projects from the bulb. This is forked with a short outer branch and a wider inner branch. There is an additional spike, or apophysis, that projects from the bulb that is sickle-shaped.

== Distribution and habitat ==
Most Troglohyphantes species live in the mountain ranges of Europe including the Pyrenees, Alps, Dinarides and Carpathians, usually in subterranean environments or caves. Troglohyphantes similis lives in Lukova jama pri Zdihovem, a cave in the Kočevje mountains of Slovenia. Troglohyphantes gracilis, Troglohyphantes spinipes and this species are very closely related with ranges that are contiguous. The three species are all referred to as the Kočevje subterranean spider. The species is at risk of climate change reducing its habitat.
