= Troglohyphantes iulianae =

Scientific classification
- Domain: Eukaryota
- Kingdom: Animalia
- Phylum: Arthropoda
- Subphylum: Chelicerata
- Class: Arachnida
- Order: Araneae
- Infraorder: Araneomorphae
- Family: Linyphiidae
- Genus: Troglohyphantes
- Species: T. iulianae

Binomial name
- Troglohyphantes iulianae Brignoli, 1971

Species of spider

Troglohyphantes iulianae is a species of cave spider of the family Linyphiidae.

== Morphology ==
Troglohyphantes iulianae is a small sized spider, with a body length of ca. 3mm.

== Distribution ==
Epigean species, occasionally found in caves. The Italian distribution ranges from the South-western Alps to the Apuan Alps (Tuscany).
