= Jelenja Vas, Štalcerji =

Jelenja Vas Iskrba
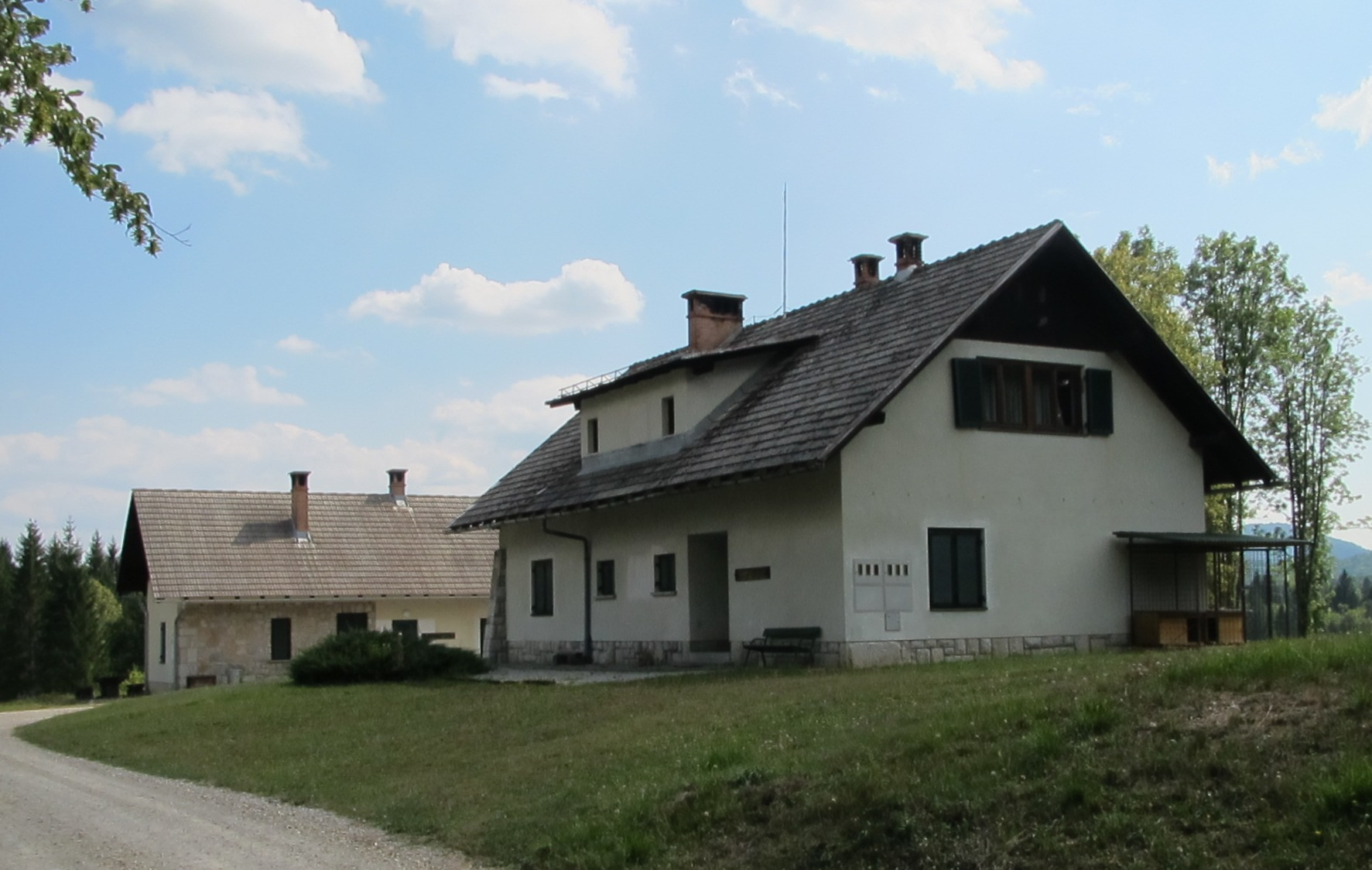
- Jelenja Vas

- Location in Slovenia
- Coordinates: 45.5618°N 14.8578°E
- Country: Slovenia
- Traditional region: Lower Carniola
- Statistical region: Southeast Slovenia
- Municipality: Kočevje
- Village: Štalcerji
- Elevation: 562 m (1,844 ft)

Jelenja Vas (pronounced [jɛˈleːnja ˈʋaːs]; Slovene: Jelenja vas, in older sources Jelena vas, formerly also Iskrba, German: Hirisgruben or Hirschgruben, Gottscheerish: Hirisgruəbə) is a hamlet of the village of Štalcerji in the Municipality of Kočevje in southern Slovenia. Formerly, it was an independent settlement. The area is part of the traditional region of Lower Carniola and is now included in the Southeast Slovenia Statistical Region.

== Name ==
The Slovene name Jelenja vas literally means 'deer village' and is derived from the Slovene common noun jelen 'red deer'. Jelenja Vas was formerly called Iskrba in Slovene, derived from the German name. The standardized German name Hirschgruben, as well as the local German name Hirisgruben and the Gottscheerish name Hirisgruəbə, are semantically similar and all mean 'deer hollow' (cf. German Hirsch 'deer', Gottscheerish hiris 'deer'), thus referring to the local fauna.

== History ==
Jelenja Vas was a village settled by Gottschee Germans. In the land registry of 1574 it consisted of one farm divided into two half-farms, corresponding to a population between seven and 10. In 1770 it had three houses. It had a population of 24 in 1880, but this fell to only 8 in 1910. Before the Second World War there were three houses in the village and a population of 12. The economy of the village was based on farming and transporting wood. In the time of the Drava Banovina, it was part of the Municipality of Kočevska Reka in Kočevje County (Srez Kočevje). The village was burned during the Second World War. In 1971 the only building at the site was a hunting lodge. An air-quality monitoring station is located at Jelenja Vas.

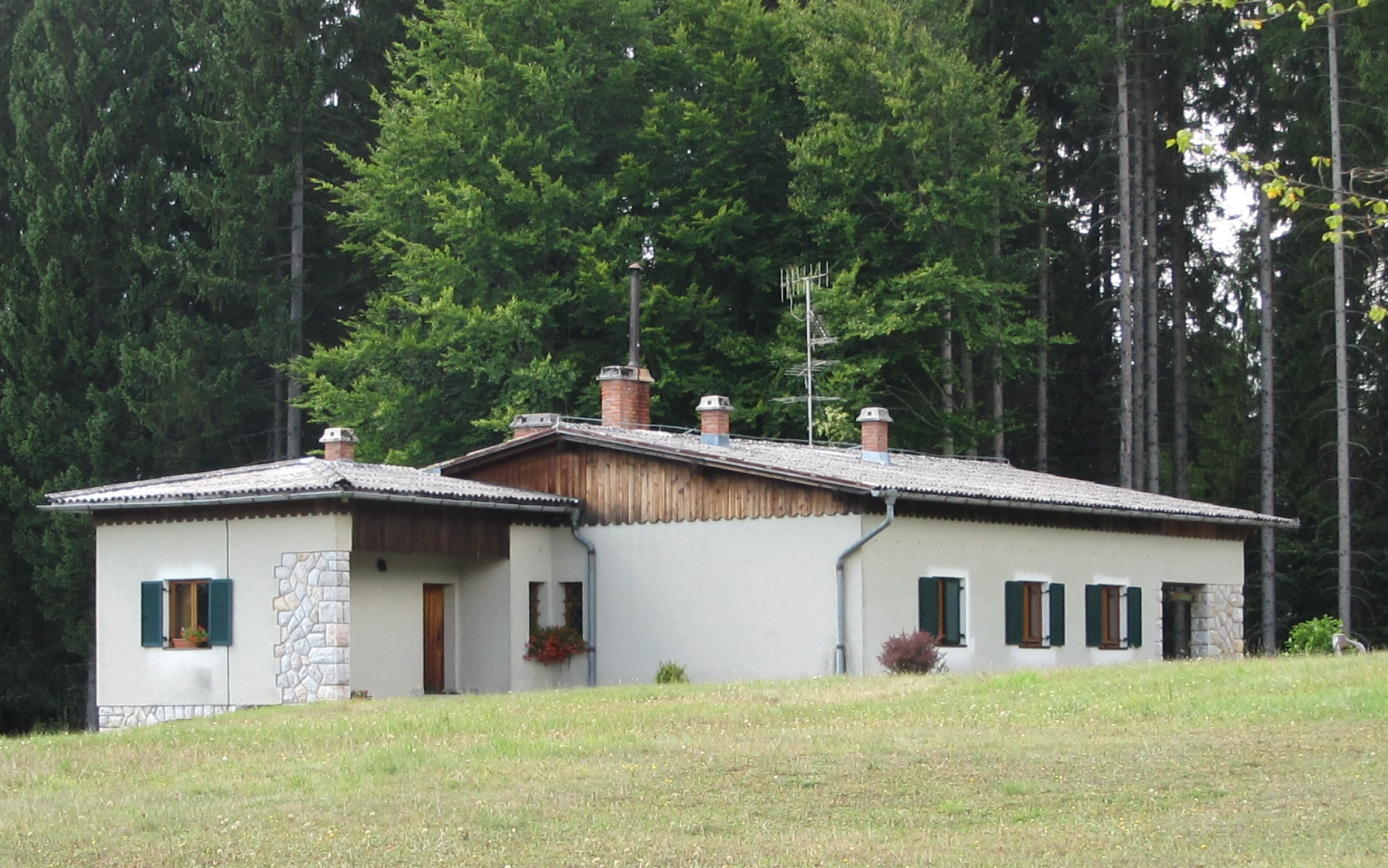
The Iskrba Lodge (Slovene: Vila Iskrba)

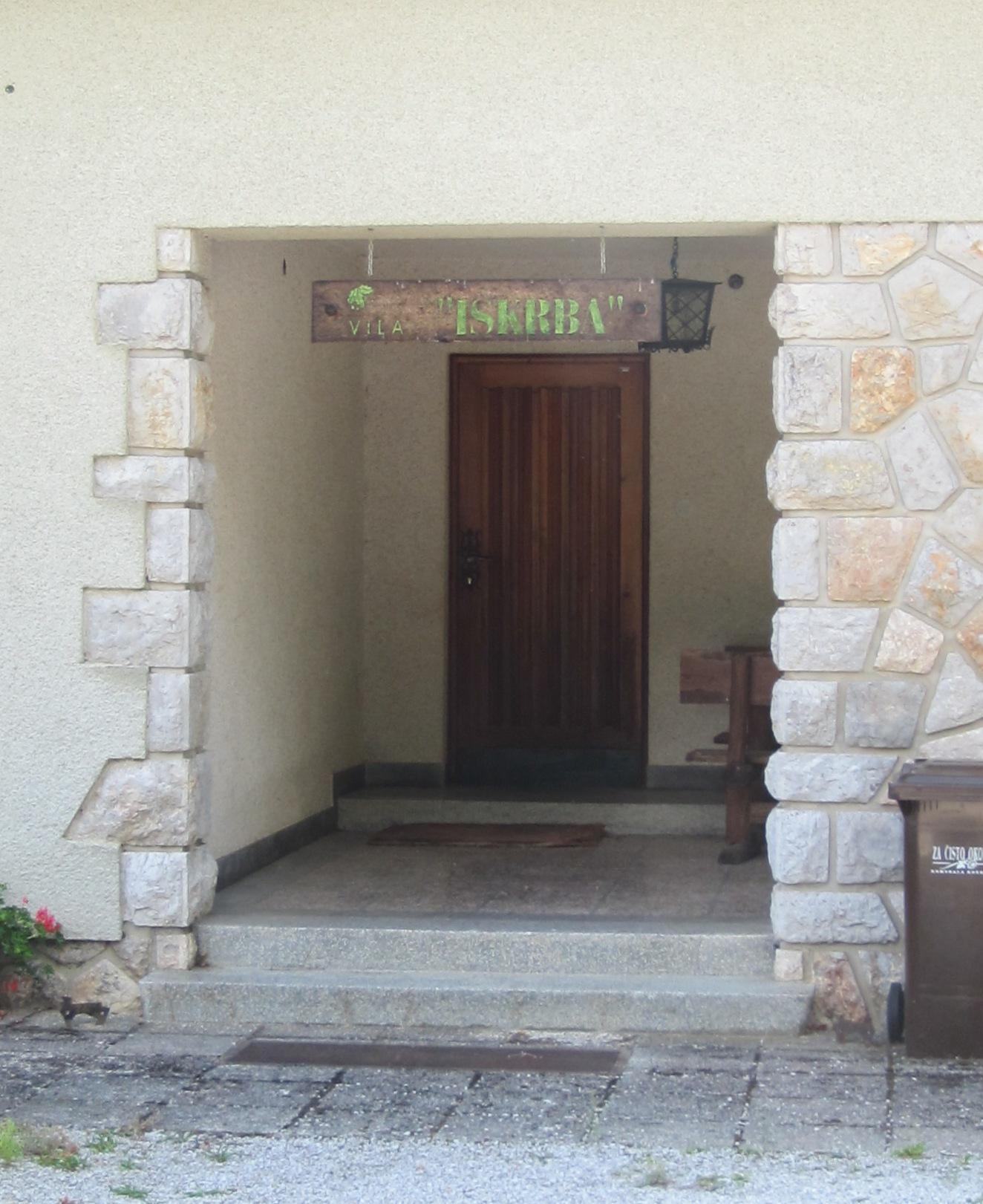
Entrance to the Iskrba Lodge
