= Troglohyphantes =

Scientific classification
- Kingdom: Animalia
- Phylum: Arthropoda
- Subphylum: Chelicerata
- Class: Arachnida
- Order: Araneae
- Infraorder: Araneomorphae
- Family: Linyphiidae
- Genus: Troglohyphantes; Joseph, 1881

Type species
- T. polyophthalmus Joseph, 1881

Species
- 134, see text

Synonyms
- Stygohyphantes Kratochvíl, 1948

Genus of spiders

Troglohyphantes is a genus of sheet weavers that was first described by G. Joseph in 1881. The genus name is a combination of the Ancient Greek τρώγλη (troglo-), meaning "cave (dweller)", and -hyphantes, a common ending for linyphiid genera.

== Species ==
As of August 2021 it contains 134 species and five subspecies, found in Europe, Africa, Siberia, Georgia, Czechia, and Iran:

- T. adjaricus Tanasevitch, 1987 – Caucasus (Russia, Georgia)
- T. affinis (Kulczyński, 1914) – Croatia, Bosnia and Herzegovina
- T. affirmatus (Simon, 1913) – Spain
- T. albicaudatus Bosmans, 2006 – Algeria
- T. albopictus Pesarini, 1989 – Italy
- T. alluaudi Fage, 1919 – Spain
- T. apenninicus Isaia, Mammola & Pantini, 2017 – Italy
- T. balazuci Dresco, 1956 – France
- T. birsteini Charitonov, 1947 – Russia, Georgia
- T. bolivarorum Machado, 1939 – Spain
- T. bolognai Brignoli, 1975 – Italy
- T. bornensis Isaia & Pantini, 2008 – Italy
- T. boudewijni Deeleman-Reinhold, 1974 – Montenegro
- T. brevipes Deeleman-Reinhold, 1978 – Bosnia and Herzegovina
- T. brignolii Deeleman-Reinhold, 1978 – Italy, Croatia
- T. bureschianus Deltshev, 1975 – Bulgaria
- T. caecus Fage, 1919 – France
- T. caligatus Pesarini, 1989 – Switzerland, Italy
- T. cantabricus Simon, 1911 – Spain
- T. caporiaccoi Brignoli, 1971 – Italy
- T. cavadinii Pesarini, 1989 – Italy
- T. cerberus (Simon, 1884) – Spain, France
- T. charitonovi Tanasevitch, 1987 – Russia
- T. cirtensis (Simon, 1910) – Algeria
- T. comottii Pesarini, 1989 – Italy
- T. confusus Kratochvíl, 1939 – Eastern Europe
- T. croaticus (Chyzer, 1894) – Eastern Europe
- T. cruentus Brignoli, 1971 – Slovenia
- T. dalmaticus (Kulczyński, 1914) – Croatia, Macedonia
- T. deelemanae Tanasevitch, 1987 – Georgia
- T. dekkingae Deeleman-Reinhold, 1978 – Bosnia and Herzegovina
  - Troglohyphantes d. pauciaculeatus Deeleman-Reinhold, 1978 – Bosnia and Herzegovina
- T. diabolicus Deeleman-Reinhold, 1978 – Slovenia
- T. dinaricus (Kratochvíl, 1948) – Croatia
- T. diurnus Kratochvíl, 1932 – Austria, Slovenia, Croatia
- T. dominici Pesarini, 1988 – Italy
- T. draconis Deeleman-Reinhold, 1978 – Macedonia
- T. drenskii Deltshev, 1973 – Bulgaria
- T. excavatus Fage, 1919 – Italy, Austria, Eastern Europe
- T. exul Thaler, 1987 – Italy
- T. fagei Roewer, 1931 – Germany, Austria, Italy
- T. fallax Deeleman-Reinhold, 1978 – Bosnia and Herzegovina
- T. fatalis Pesarini, 1988 – Italy
- T. fugax (Kulczyński, 1914) – Bosnia and Herzegovina
- T. furcifer (Simon, 1884) – Spain
- T. gamsi Deeleman-Reinhold, 1978 – Slovenia
- T. gestroi Fage, 1933 – Italy
- T. giachinoi Isaia & Mammola, 2018 – Italy
- T. giromettai (Kulczyński, 1914) – Croatia
- T. gladius Wunderlich, 1995 – Turkey
- T. gracilis Fage, 1919 – Slovenia
- T. gregori (Miller, 1947) – Czech Rep.
- T. hadzii Kratochvíl, 1934 – Bosnia and Herzegovina
- T. helsdingeni Deeleman-Reinhold, 1978 – Austria, Slovenia
- T. henroti Dresco, 1956 – France
- T. herculanus (Kulczyński, 1894) – Eastern Europe
- T. inermis Deeleman-Reinhold, 1978 – Macedonia
- T. iulianae Brignoli, 1971 – Italy
- T. jamatus Roewer, 1931 – Slovenia
- T. jeanneli Dumitrescu & Georgescu, 1970 – Romania
- T. juris Thaler, 1982 – Italy
- T. karawankorum Deeleman-Reinhold, 1978 – Austria, Slovenia
- T. karolianus Topçu, Türkes & Seyyar, 2008 – Turkey
- T. konradi Brignoli, 1975 – Italy
- T. kordunlikanus Deeleman-Reinhold, 1978 – Croatia
- T. kratochvili Drensky, 1935 – Macedonia
- T. labrada Wunderlich, 2012 – Canary Is.
- T. lanai Isaia & Pantini, 2010 – Italy
- T. latzeli Thaler, 1986 – Austria
- T. lesserti Kratochvíl, 1935 – SE Europe (Balkans)
- T. lessinensis Caporiacco, 1936 – Italy
- T. liburnicus Caporiacco, 1927 – SE Europe (Balkans)
- T. lucifer Isaia, Mammola & Pantini, 2017 – Italy
- T. lucifuga (Simon, 1884) – France, Italy, Switzerland
- T. marqueti (Simon, 1884) – Spain, France
  - Troglohyphantes m. pauciaculeatus Simon, 1929 – France
- T. microcymbium Pesarini, 2001 – Italy
- T. milleri (Kratochvíl, 1948) – Bosnia and Herzegovina
- T. montanus Absolon & Kratochvíl, 1932 – Bosnia and Herzegovina
- T. nigraerosae Brignoli, 1971 – Italy
- T. noricus (Thaler & Polenec, 1974) – Germany, Austria
- T. novicordis Thaler, 1978 – Austria
- T. numidus (Simon, 1911) – Algeria
- T. nyctalops Simon, 1911 – Spain
- T. orghidani Dumitrescu & Georgescu, 1977 – Romania
- T. oromii (Ribera & Blasco, 1986) – Canary Is.
- T. orpheus (Simon, 1884) – France
- T. paulusi Thaler, 2002 – Iran
- T. pavesii Pesarini, 1988 – Italy
- T. pedemontanus (Gozo, 1908) – Italy
- T. phragmitis (Simon, 1884) – France
- T. pisidicus Brignoli, 1971 – Turkey
- T. pluto Caporiacco, 1938 – Italy
- T. poleneci Wiehle, 1964 – Italy, Slovenia
- T. polyophthalmus Joseph, 1881 (type) – Slovenia
- T. pretneri Deeleman-Reinhold, 1978 – Montenegro, Albania
- T. pugnax Deeleman-Reinhold, 1978 – Croatia, Bosnia and Herzegovina
- T. pumilio Denis, 1959 – France
- T. pyrenaeus Simon, 1907 – France
- T. racovitzai Dumitrescu & Georgescu, 1970 – Romania
- T. regalini Pesarini, 1989 – Italy
- T. roberti Deeleman-Reinhold, 1978 – Croatia
  - Troglohyphantes r. dalmatensis Deeleman-Reinhold, 1978 – Croatia
- T. roquensis Barrientos & Fernández-Pérez, 2018 – Spain (Canary Is.)
- T. ruffoi Caporiacco, 1936 – Italy
- T. salax (Kulczyński, 1914) – Croatia, Bosnia and Herzegovina
- T. saouaf Bosmans, 2006 – Algeria, Tunisia
- T. sbordonii Brignoli, 1975 – Austria, Italy, Slovenia
- T. schenkeli (Miller, 1937) – Slovakia
- T. sciakyi Pesarini, 1989 – Italy
- T. scientificus Deeleman-Reinhold, 1978 – Italy, Slovenia
- T. similis Fage, 1919 – Slovenia
- T. simoni Fage, 1919 – France
- T. sketi Deeleman-Reinhold, 1978 – Slovenia, Croatia
- T. solitarius Fage, 1919 – France
- T. sordellii (Pavesi, 1875) – Switzerland, Italy
- T. spatulifer Pesarini, 2001 – Italy
- T. spinipes Fage, 1919 – Slovenia
- T. strandi Absolon & Kratochvíl, 1932 – Croatia
- T. subalpinus Thaler, 1967 – Germany, Austria, Slovenia, Croatia
- T. svilajensis (Kratochvíl, 1948) – Croatia
  - Troglohyphantes s. bosnicus (Kratochvíl, 1948) – Bosnia and Herzegovina
  - Troglohyphantes s. noctiphilus (Kratochvíl, 1948) – Croatia
- T. tauriscus Thaler, 1982 – Austria
- T. thaleri Miller & Polenec, 1975 – Austria, Slovenia
- T. trispinosus Miller & Polenec, 1975 – Slovenia
- T. troglodytes (Kulczyński, 1914) – Croatia, Bosnia and Herzegovina
- T. turcicus Topçu, Türkeş, Seyyar, Demircan & Karabulut, 2014 – Turkey
- T. typhlonetiformis Absolon & Kratochvíl, 1932 – Austria, Slovenia
- T. vicinus Miller & Polenec, 1975 – Slovenia
- T. vignai Brignoli, 1971 – Italy
- T. wiebesi Deeleman-Reinhold, 1978 – Croatia, Bosnia and Herzegovina
- T. wiehlei Miller & Polenec, 1975 – Austria, Eastern Europe
- T. zanoni Pesarini, 1988 – Italy
