= Troglohyphantes lucifuga =

Scientific classification
- Kingdom: Animalia
- Phylum: Arthropoda
- Subphylum: Chelicerata
- Class: Arachnida
- Order: Araneae
- Infraorder: Araneomorphae
- Family: Linyphiidae
- Genus: Troglohyphantes
- Species: T. lucifuga

Binomial name
- Troglohyphantes lucifuga (Simon, 1884)

Species of spider

Troglohyphantes lucifuga is a species of cave spider of the family Linyphiidae. Its distribution is European: France, Italy, Switzerland.

== Morphology ==
Troglohyphantes lucifuga is a small sized spider, with a body length of ca. 7mm.
