= Kultur im Gugg =

Theatre and cultural center in Braunau, Austria

Coordinates: 48°15′32″N 13°02′11″E

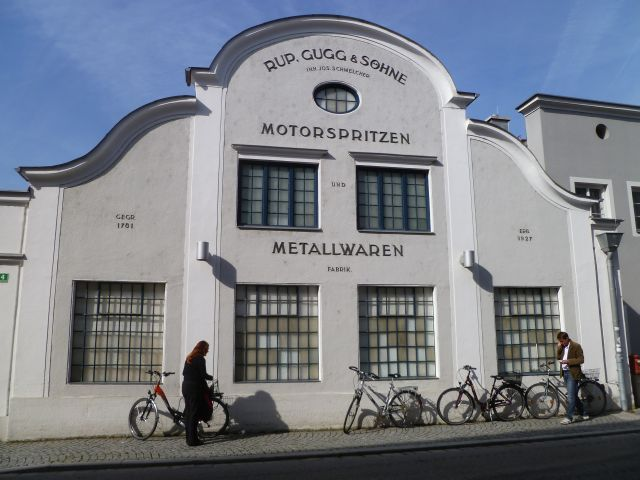
Kultur im Gugg

Kultur im Gugg is a venue for contemporary art and culture in Braunau am Inn in Austria. The building was originally a fire-fighting equipment factory.
