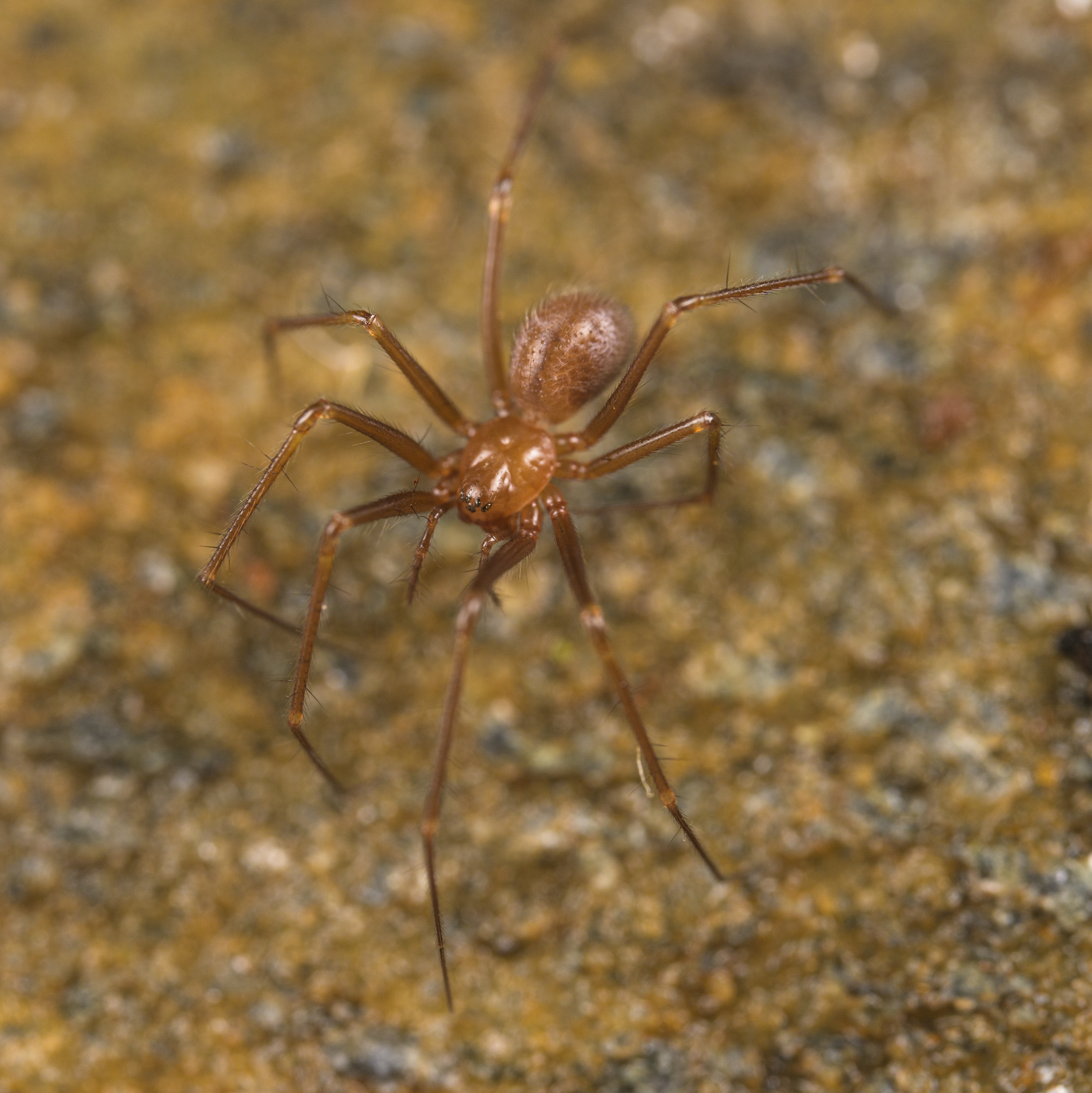

Scientific classification
- Kingdom: Animalia
- Phylum: Arthropoda
- Subphylum: Chelicerata
- Class: Arachnida
- Order: Araneae
- Infraorder: Araneomorphae
- Family: Linyphiidae
- Genus: Troglohyphantes
- Species: T. vignai

Binomial name
- Troglohyphantes vignai Brignoli, 1971

= Troglohyphantes vignai =

Species of spider

Troglohyphantes vignai is a species of cave spider of the family Linyphiidae. It is endemic to Italy.

== Morphology ==
Troglohyphantes vignai is a small sized spider with a body length ranging from 3.05 mm to 3.35 mm. It shows remarkable adaptations to the subterranean life, namely loss of pigmentation, reduction of the eye apparatus, thinning of integuments and heavy spination.

== Synonymy ==
Troglohyphantes vignai was described by Brignoli from specimens collected by Augusto Vigna Taglianti (to whom the species was dedicated) in the cave Buco di Valenza. In the same publication, Pier Marcello Brignoli also described a second Troglohyphantes species (T. rupicapra), which is distinguished from T. vignai by small morphological features. In recent years, the species validity of T. rupicapra was questioned by Pesarini, who proposed the synonymy T. rupicapra = T. vignai. Such synonymy was recently confirmed on genetic base, and its currently accepted in the World Spider Catalog.

== Distribution ==
Troglohyphantes vignai is endemic to the Western Italian Alps, distributed from the Cottian to the Maritime Alps. Populations of T. vignai are highly isolated from genetic point of view. The diversification of extant T. vignai lineages occurred during the Pleistocene glaciations.

== Habitat ==
Preferentially found in caves and other mad-made subterranean habitats. The species show a preference for prey-rich areas of the cave, where the climatic stability is higher.

== Phenology ==
Females and juveniles are found through the whole year. Males are commonly found from August to January, with a sex ratio (females:males) of 2.4:1.
