= Kočevje =

- Town
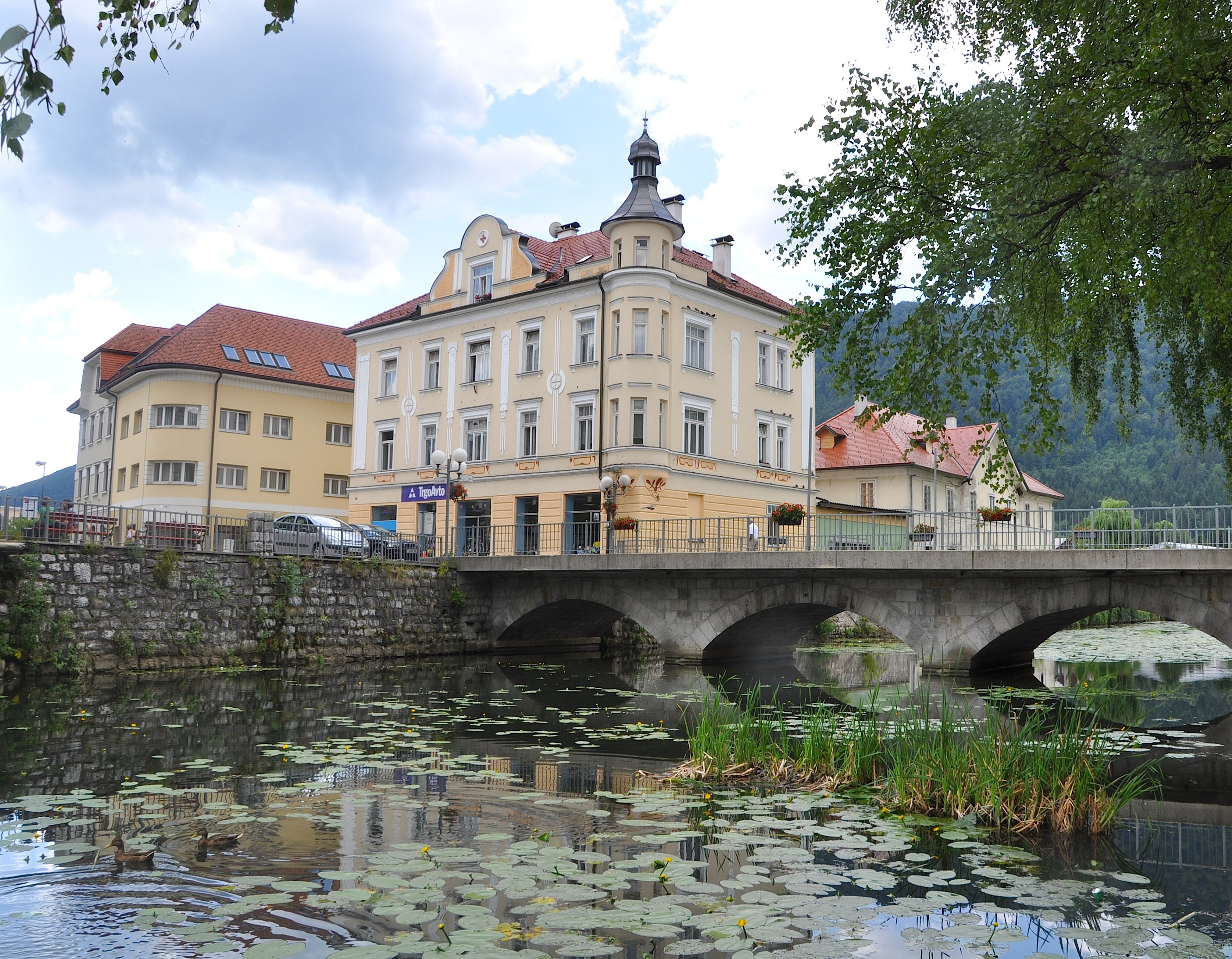
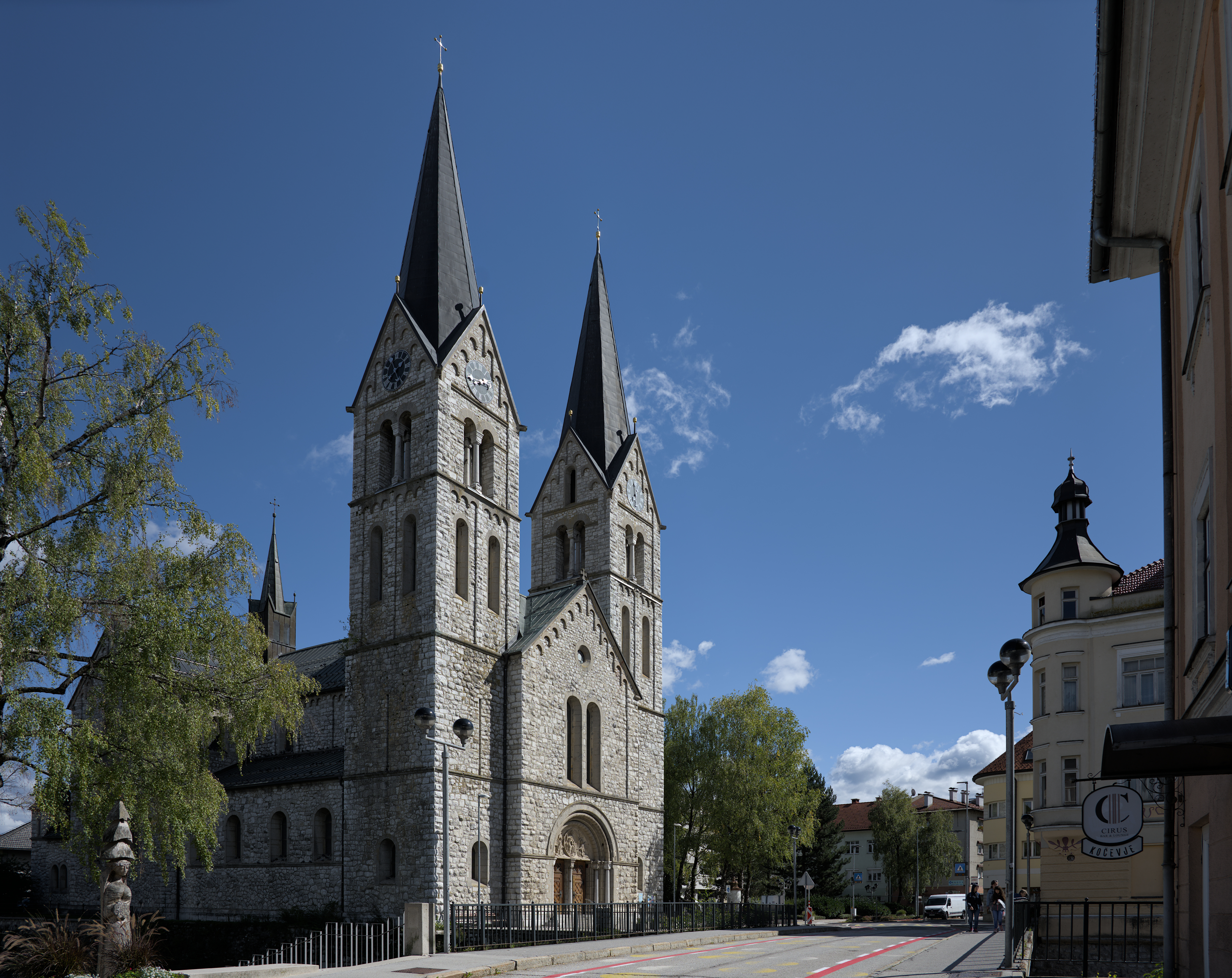
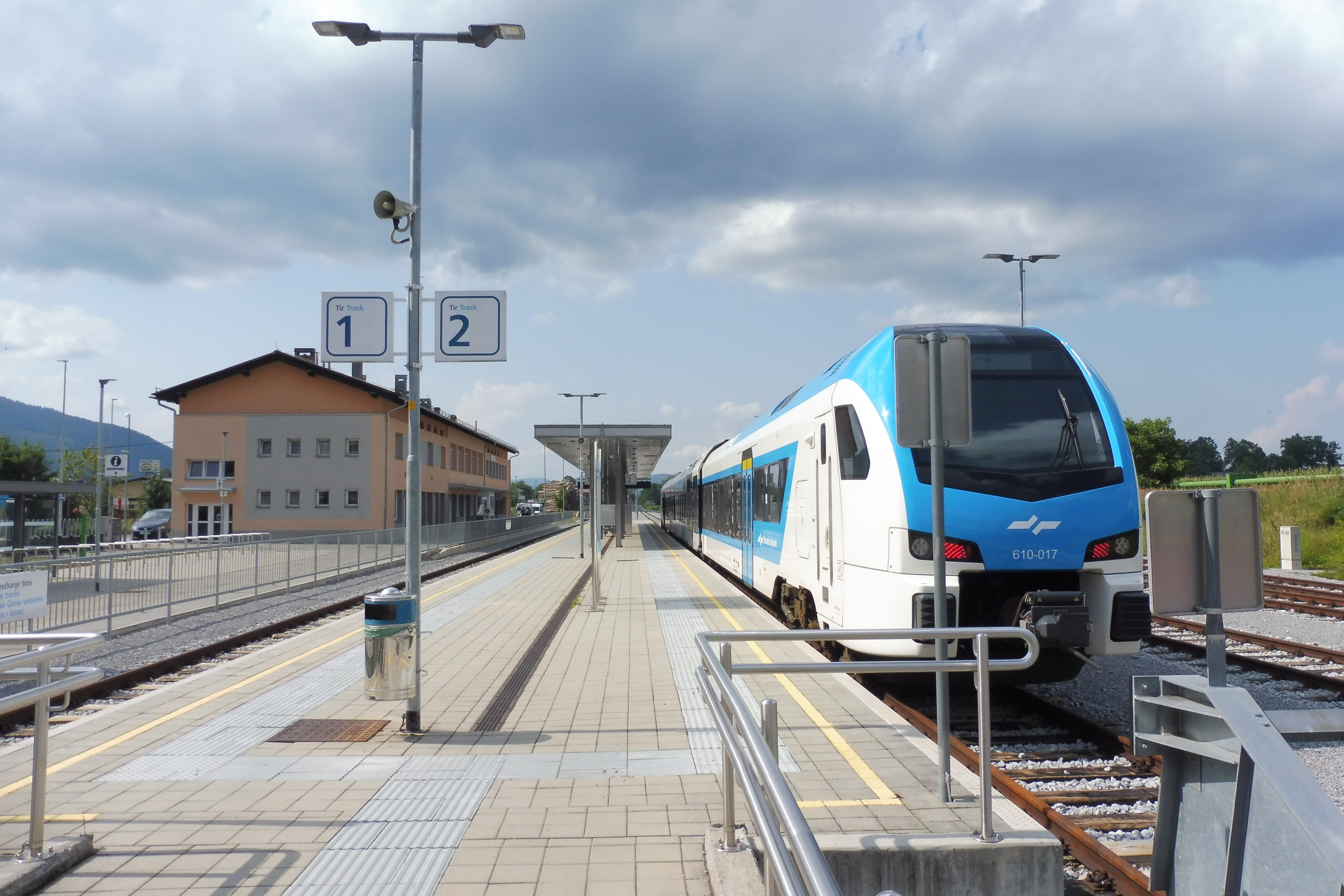
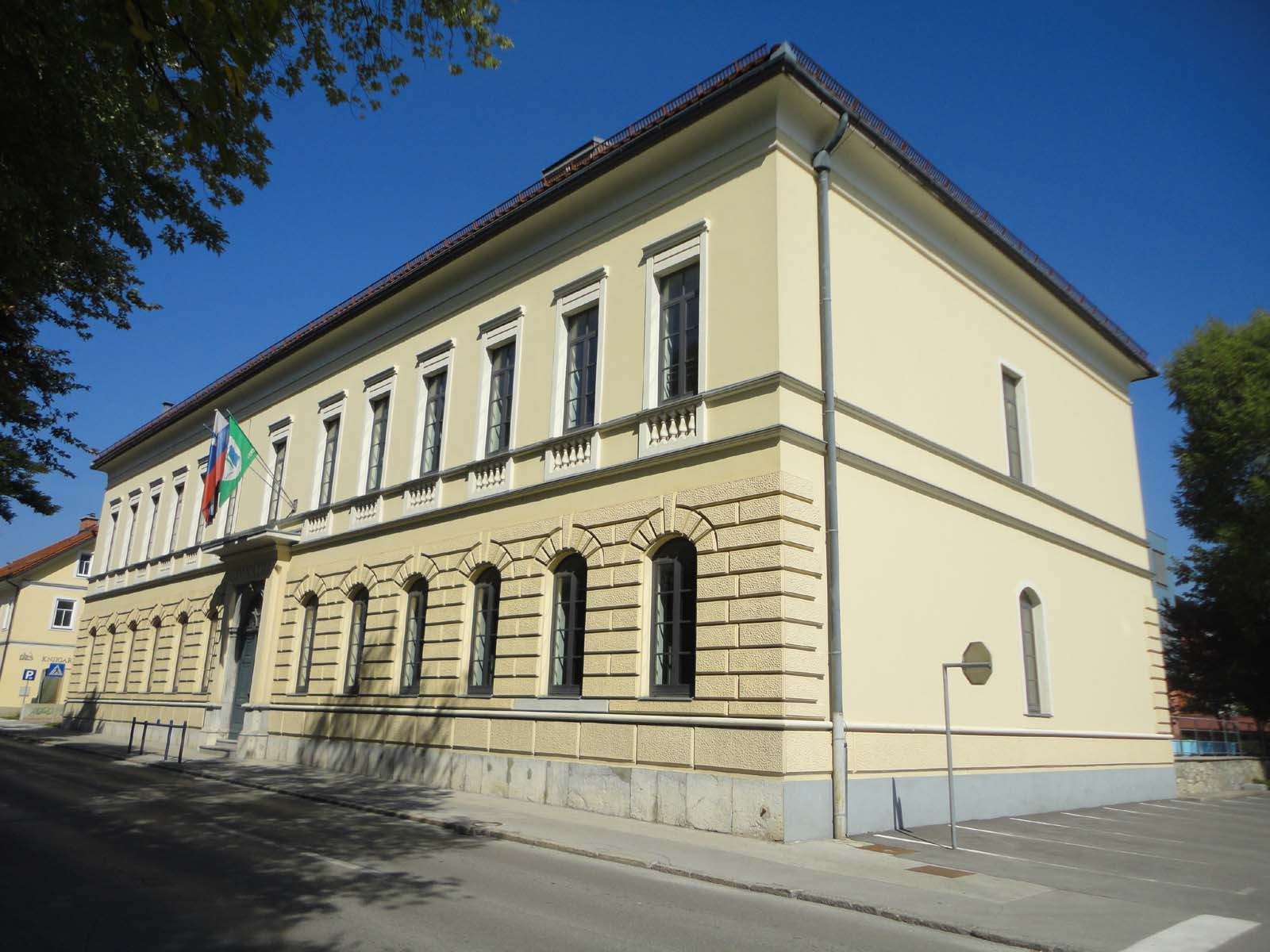
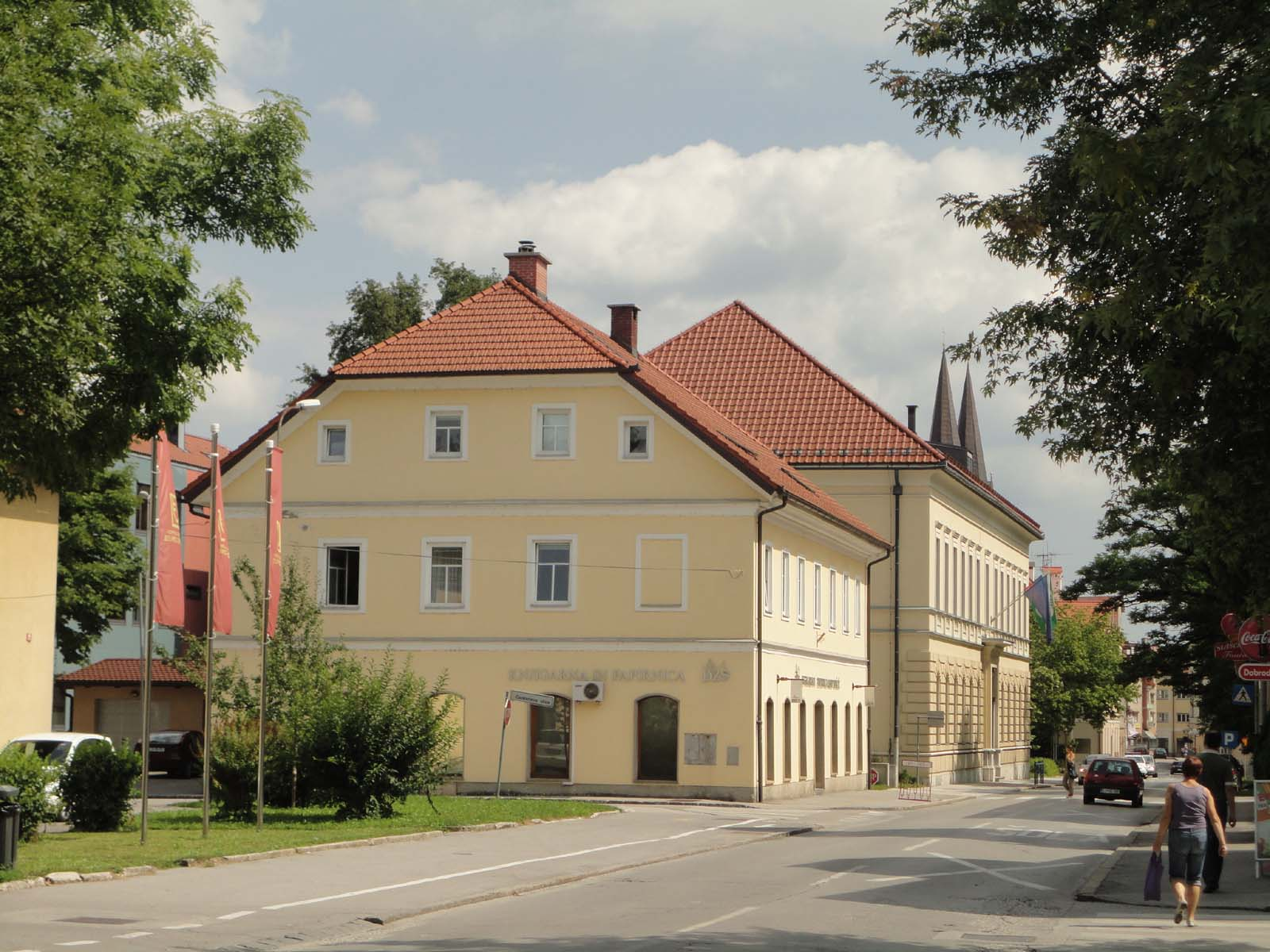
- From top, left to right: Town center, Saint Bartholomew Church, Railway Station, Gymnasium, Central Street

- Flag Coat of arms

- Location of the City of Kočevje in Slovenia
- Coordinates: 45°38′34.66″N 14°51′33.78″E
- Country: Slovenia

Government
  - Mayor: Gregor Košir

Area
  - Total: 14.14 km^{2} (5.46 sq mi)
- Elevation: 465 m (1,526 ft)

Population (2021)
  - Total: 8,113
- Time zone: UTC+01 (CET)
  - Summer (DST): UTC+02 (CEST)
- Vehicle registration: LJ

Kočevje (pronounced [kɔˈtʃéːwjɛ]; German: Gottschee; Göttscheab or Gətscheab in the local Gottscheerish dialect; Italian: Cocevie) is a town and the seat of Municipality of Kočevje in southern Slovenia.

== Geography ==
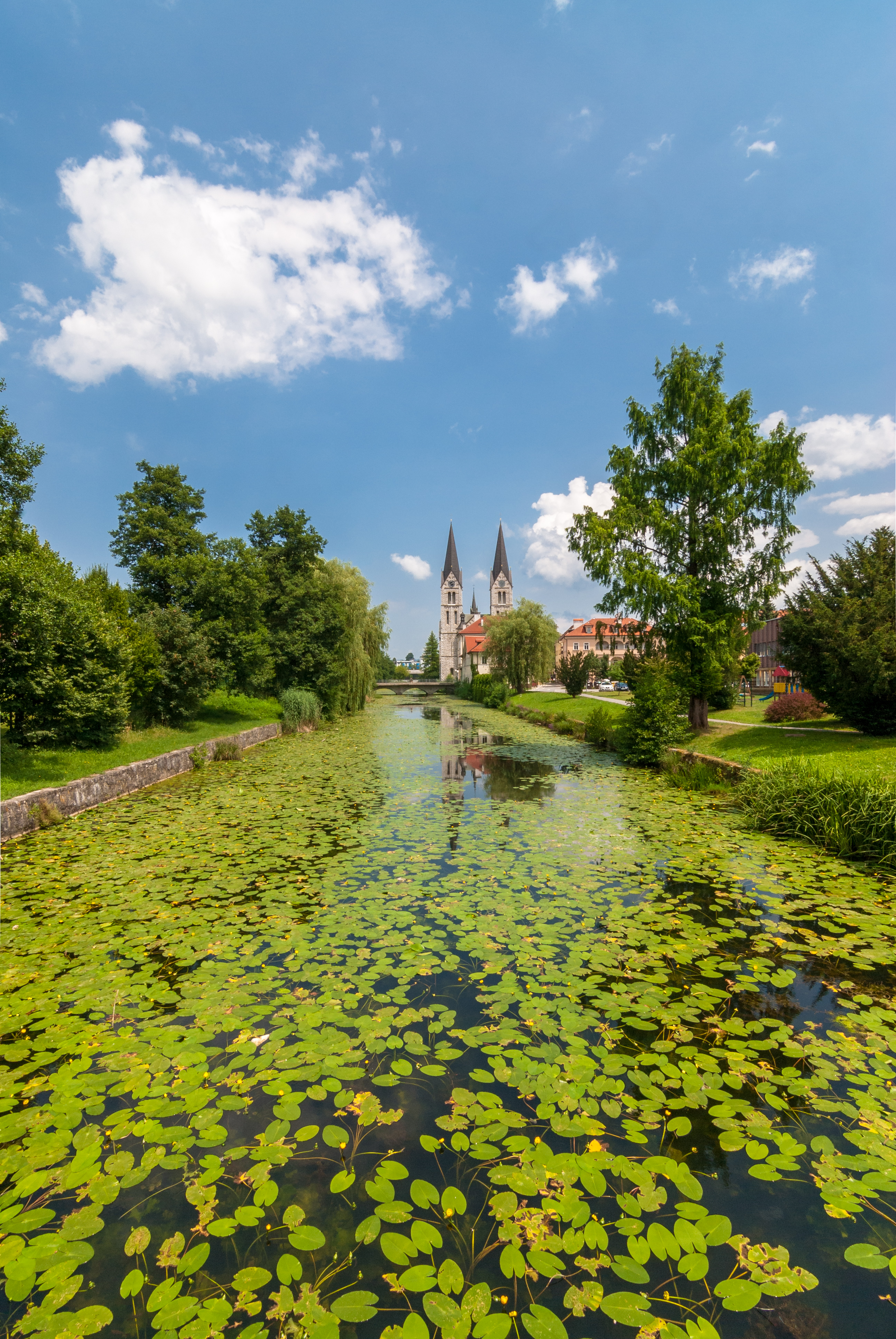
The Rinža River

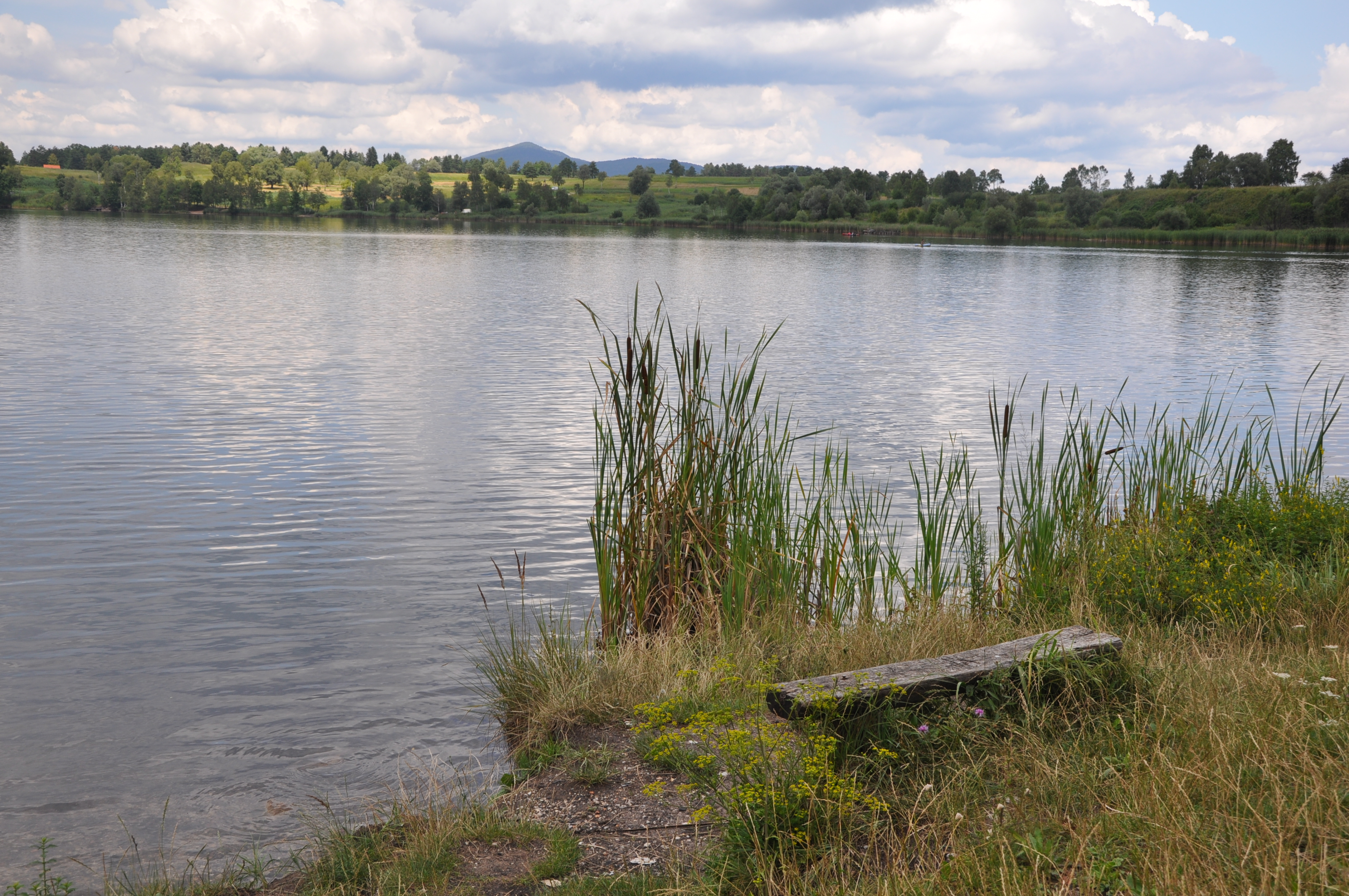
Lake Kočevje

The town is located at the foot of the Kočevski Rog karst plateau on the Rinža River in the historic Lower Carniola region. It is now part of the Southeast Slovenia Statistical Region. The Rinža River flows through the town. Lake Kočejve, a former open-pit coal mine, lies northeast of the town center.

== Climate ==
Kočevje features a humid continental climate (Dfb/Cfb).

Climate data for Kočevje, 1991–2020 normals, extremes 1951–2020
Month	Jan	Feb	Mar	Apr	May	Jun	Jul	Aug	Sep	Oct	Nov	Dec	Year
Record high °C (°F)	18.2 (64.8)	21.1 (70.0)	24.2 (75.6)	28.3 (82.9)	31.3 (88.3)	35.1 (95.2)	35.9 (96.6)	37.6 (99.7)	32.1 (89.8)	27 (81)	23.6 (74.5)	16.1 (61.0)	37.6 (99.7)
Mean daily maximum °C (°F)	4.1 (39.4)	6.3 (43.3)	10.8 (51.4)	15.6 (60.1)	20.0 (68.0)	23.9 (75.0)	26.0 (78.8)	25.9 (78.6)	20.4 (68.7)	15.5 (59.9)	9.6 (49.3)	4.5 (40.1)	15.2 (59.4)
Daily mean °C (°F)	−0.6 (30.9)	0.3 (32.5)	4.2 (39.6)	8.7 (47.7)	13.2 (55.8)	17.0 (62.6)	18.4 (65.1)	17.9 (64.2)	13.3 (55.9)	9.2 (48.6)	4.9 (40.8)	0.0 (32.0)	8.9 (48.0)
Mean daily minimum °C (°F)	−4.2 (24.4)	−4 (25)	−0.6 (30.9)	3.3 (37.9)	7.4 (45.3)	10.9 (51.6)	12.2 (54.0)	12.2 (54.0)	8.6 (47.5)	5.1 (41.2)	1.5 (34.7)	−3.3 (26.1)	4.1 (39.4)
Record low °C (°F)	−29.6 (−21.3)	−31.1 (−24.0)	−26 (−15)	−10.4 (13.3)	−6.8 (19.8)	−1.4 (29.5)	2.3 (36.1)	0.8 (33.4)	−4.1 (24.6)	−8.5 (16.7)	−20.8 (−5.4)	−23.9 (−11.0)	−31.1 (−24.0)
Average precipitation mm (inches)	80 (3.1)	97 (3.8)	87 (3.4)	109 (4.3)	123 (4.8)	129 (5.1)	113 (4.4)	117 (4.6)	160 (6.3)	161 (6.3)	155 (6.1)	123 (4.8)	1,454 (57)
Average extreme snow depth cm (inches)	8 (3.1)	13 (5.1)	4 (1.6)	0.3 (0.1)	0 (0)	0 (0)	0 (0)	0 (0)	0 (0)	0.1 (0.0)	2 (0.8)	6 (2.4)	13 (5.1)
Average precipitation days (≥ 0.1 mm)	12	11	12	14	15	15	13	12	14	15	16	14	163
Source: Slovenian Environment Agency (ARSO)

Historical population
Year	Pop.	±%
1948	2,991	—
1953	4,447	+48.7%
1961	5,891	+32.5%
1971	7,382	+25.3%
1981	9,598	+30.0%
1991	9,363	−2.4%
2002	9,027	−3.6%
2011	8,672	−3.9%
2021	8,113	−6.4%
Population size may be affected by changes in administrative divisions.

== Name ==
Kočevje was attested in written sources in 1363 as Gotsche (and as Gotsew in 1386, Kotsche in 1425, and propre Koczeuiam in 1478). The name is derived from *Hvojčevje (from hvoja 'fir, spruce'), referring to the local vegetation. The initial hv- changed to k- under the influence of German phonology. Older discredited explanations include derivation from the hypothetical common noun *kočevje 'nomadic settlement' and Slovene koča 'shack'. The former German name was Gottschee.

== History ==
In 1247 Berthold, Patriarch of Aquileia, granted the area around Ribnica within the imperial March of Carniola to the Carinthian counts of Ortenburg. When the counts had received further estates in 1336 on the wooded plateau down to Kostel on the Kolpa River from the hands of Patriarch Bertram, they called for German-speaking settlers from Carinthia and Tyrol. In the following decades they established the town of Gottschee, which was first mentioned in a 1363 deed. The settlement received market rights in 1377 and town privileges in 1471.

Until 1918, the town was part of the Austrian Empire (and part of Cisleithania after the Austro-Hungarian Compromise of 1867), in the district of the same name, as one of the 11 Bezirkshauptmannschaften in province of Carniola. The German name alone was used by the post office before 1867.

After the Second World War, a Yugoslav labor camp for political prisoners operated in Kočevje until March 1946.

=== Germans of Kočevje ===
They first settled in Carniola around 1330 from the German lands of Tyrol and Carinthia and maintained their German identity and language during their 600 years of isolation. They cleared the vast forests of the region and established villages and towns. In 1809, they resisted French occupation in the 1809 Gottscheer Rebellion. With the end of the Habsburg monarchy in 1918, Gottschee became a part of the new Kingdom of Yugoslavia. The Gottscheer thus went from being part of the ruling ethnicity of Austria-Hungary (and the ruling group in the estates of the province of Carniola itself) to an ethnic minority in a large Slavic state. With the onset of the Second World War and the Invasion of Yugoslavia their situation was worsened further.

== Landmarks ==
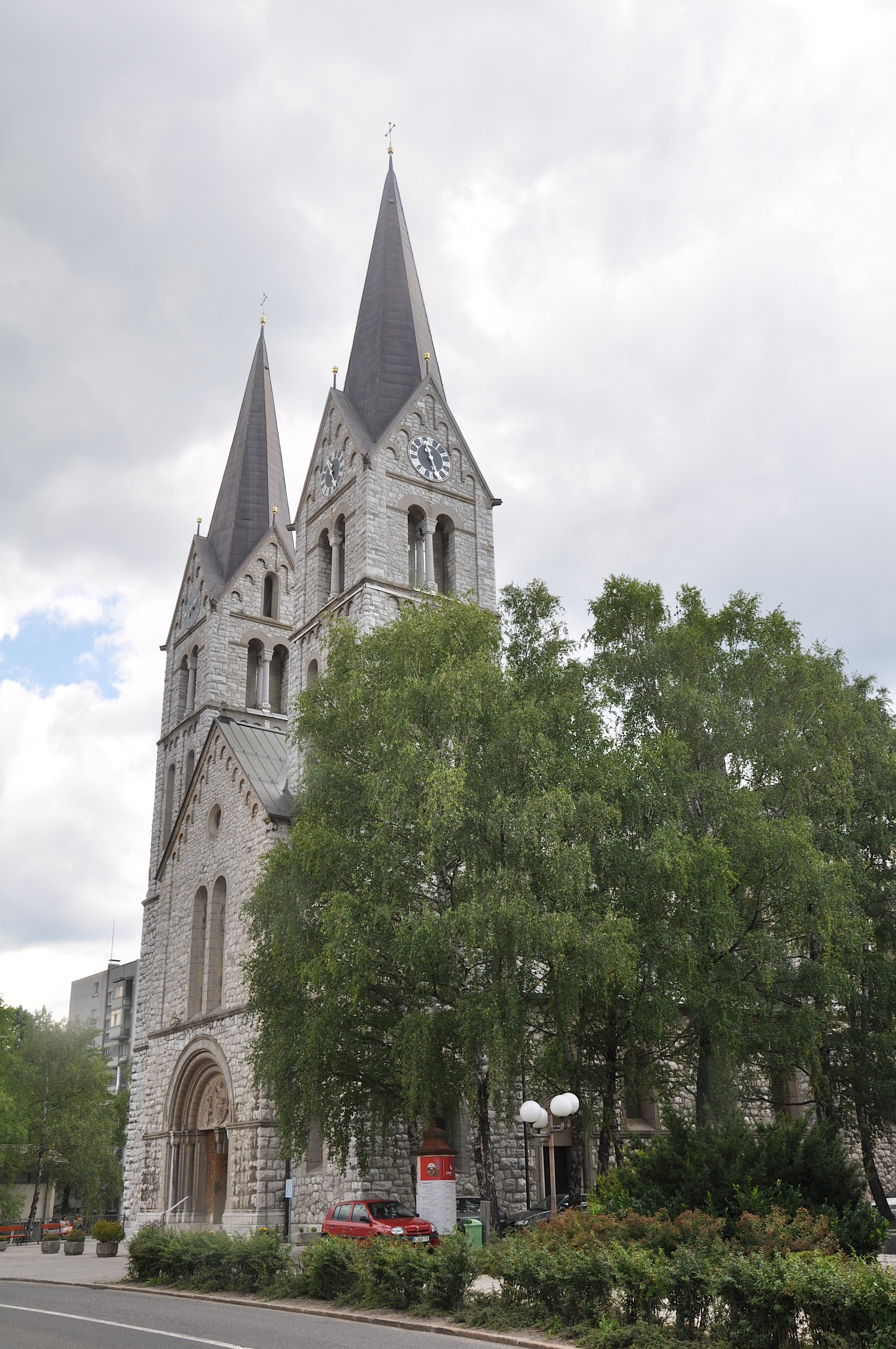
St. Bartholomew's Parish Church

The parish church in the town is dedicated to Saint Bartholomew (Slovene: Sveti Jernej) and belongs to the Roman Catholic Diocese of Novo Mesto. It is a Neo-Romanesque building erected between 1887 and 1903 on the site of an earlier church.

== Notable people ==
Notable people that were born or lived in Kočevje include:

- Stane Jarm (1931–2011), sculptor, graphic artist and teacher (worked in Kočevje)
- Matej Bor (1913–1993), poet and author
- Milan Butina (1923–1999), academy-trained painter, art teacher, art theorist
- Ivan Jurkovič (born 1952), apostolic nuncio to Russia
- Zofka Kveder (1878–1926), writer
- Viktor Parma (1858–1924), composer
- Roman Erich Petsche (1907–1993), teacher, painter, and Righteous Among the Nations
- Jože Šeško (1908–1942), secondary-school professor, social revolutionary, communist resistance fighter

== Bibliography ==
- Gauß, Karl-Markus (2001). Die sterbenden Europäer. Unterwegs zu den Sepharden von Sarajevo, Gottscheer Deutschen, Arbëreshe, Sorben und Aromunen (in German). Vienna: Zsolnay. ISBN 3-552-05158-9.
