= Renea =

Renea may refer to:

- Renea (gastropod), a genus of snails in the family Aciculidae
- Renea (junior synonym of Prionopelta), a genus of ants in the subfamily Amblyoponinae
- RENEA, the acronym for Reparti i Neutralizimit te Elementit te Armatosur, an Albanian counter-terrorist unit
- Priscilla Renea (born 1988), American singer-songwriter
- Renea Jones (born 1966), American politician
