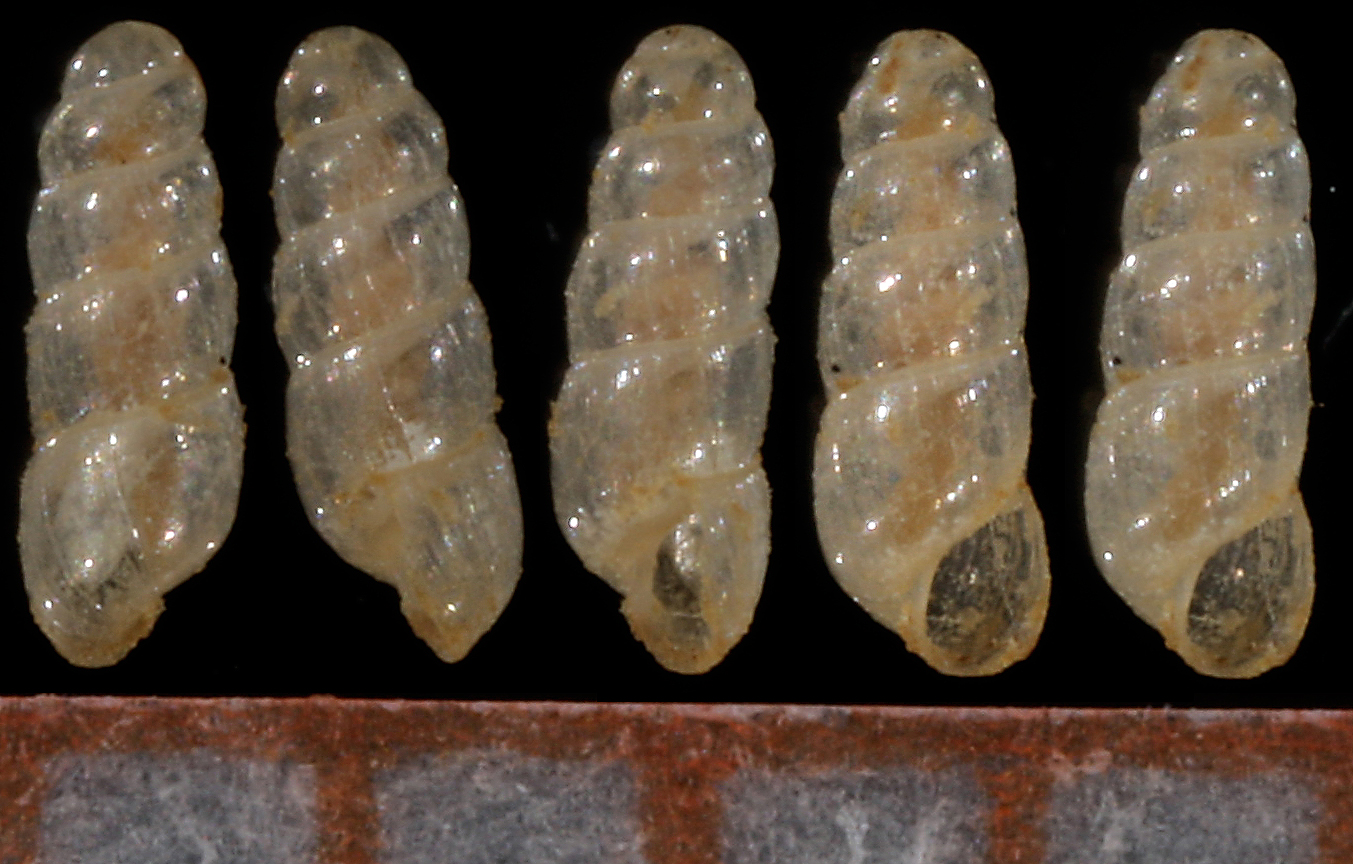
- Acicula parcelineata shells

Conservation status
- Least Concern (IUCN 3.1)

Scientific classification
- Kingdom: Animalia
- Phylum: Mollusca
- Class: Gastropoda
- Subclass: Caenogastropoda
- Order: Architaenioglossa
- Family: Aciculidae
- Genus: Acicula
- Species: A. parcelineata

Binomial name
- Acicula parcelineata (Clessin, 1911)

Synonyms
- Acme parcelineata Clessin, 1911

= Acicula parcelineata =

Species of gastropod

Acicula parcelineata is a species of small land snail with an operculum, a terrestrial gastropod mollusc in the family Aciculidae.

== Distribution ==
This species is found in the Czech Republic (in Moravia only), Slovakia, Poland, Romania, Ukraine.
