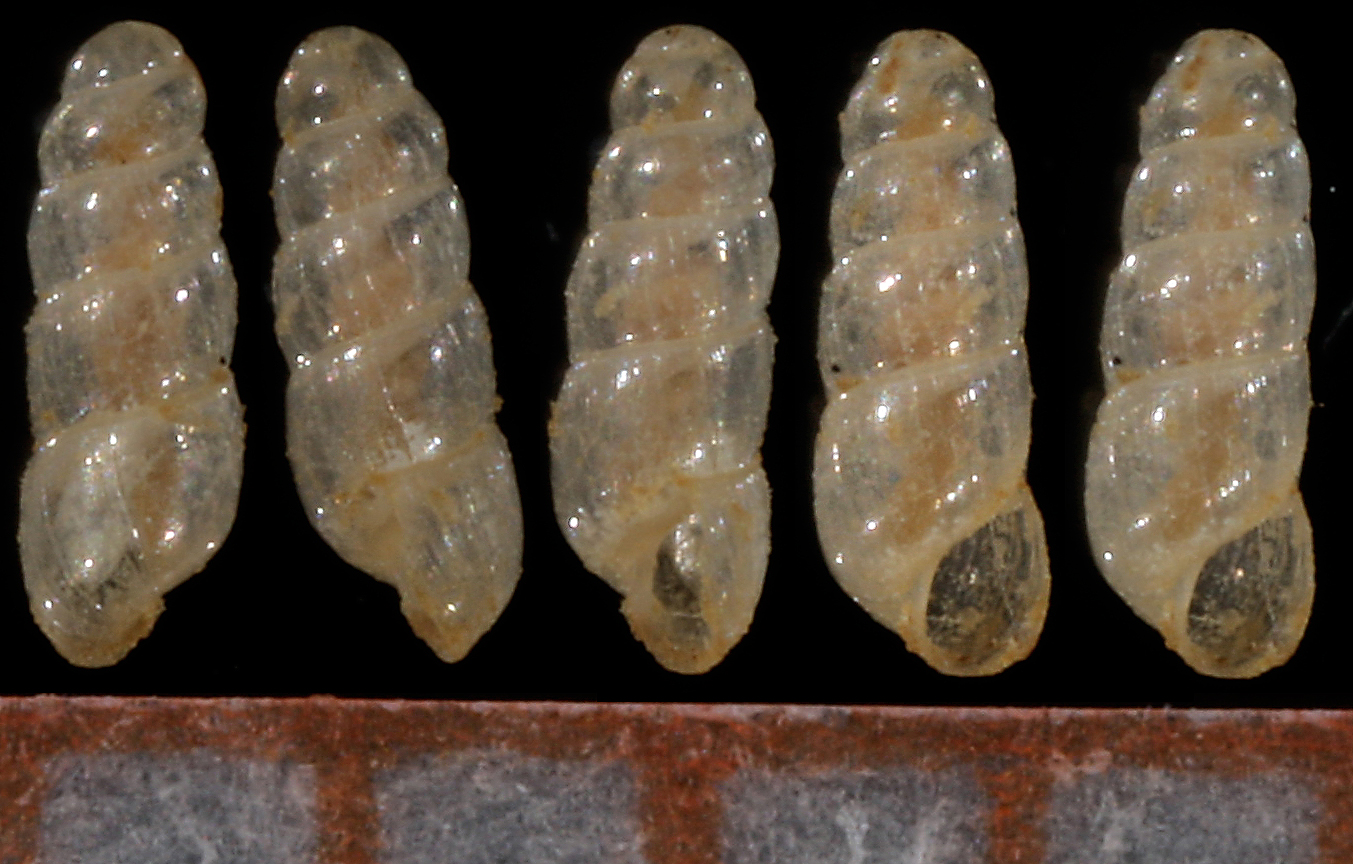
- Acicula parcelineata shells

Scientific classification
- Kingdom: Animalia
- Phylum: Mollusca
- Class: Gastropoda
- Subclass: Caenogastropoda
- Order: Architaenioglossa
- Family: Aciculidae
- Genus: Acicula; Hartmann, 1821

Type species
- Bulimus lineatus Draparnaud, 1801

Synonyms
- Acicula (Acicula) Hartmann, 1821 · accepted, alternate representation; Acme Hartmann, 1821 (Invalid: Placed on the Official Index by Opinion 344; objective synonym of Acicula Hartmann, 1821); Acme (Acicula) W. Hartmann, 1821 (Acme is invalid); Acme (Acme) W. Hartmann, 1821 · unaccepted (invalid); Acmea W. Hartmann, 1821 unavailable name (Invalid: Suppressed for the purposes of the Law of Priority by Opinion 344, 1955, Opinions and Declarations rendered by the ICZN, 10(11): 315); Pupula Charpentier, 1837 (junior synonym); Truncatella (Pupula) Charpentier, 1837

= Acicula (gastropod) =

Genus of gastropods

Acicula is a genus of very small land snails with an operculum, terrestrial gastropod mollusks in the family Aciculidae.

== Species ==
Species within the genus Acicula include:

- Acicula algerensis E. Gittenberger & Boeters, 1977
- Acicula beneckei (Andreae, 1883)
- Acicula benoiti (Bourguignat, 1864)
- Acicula corcyrensis (O. Boettger, 1883)
- † Acicula crassistoma Stworzewicz & Sołtys, 1996
- † Acicula diezi (Flach, 1889)
- Acicula disjuncta Boeters, E. Gittenberger & Subai, 1989
- Acicula douctouyrensis (Bertrand, 2004) - Aiguillette du Douctouyre
- † Acicula edlaueri Schlickum, 1970
- † Acicula filifera Sandberger, 1862
- † Acicula flachi (Clessin, 1911)
- Acicula fusca (Montagu, 1803) - point snail
- † Acicula giuntellii Harzhauser, Neubauer & Esu in Harzhauser et al., 2015
- Acicula hausdorfi Boeters, E. Gittenberger & Subai, 1989
- Acicula hierae Liberto, Reitano, R. Viviano & Sparacio, 2020
- † Acicula isselii (Flach, 1889)
- † Acicula kadolskyi Manganelli, Cianfanelli, Barbato & Benocci, 2014
- Acicula lallemanti (Bourguignat, 1864)
- Acicula letourneuxi (Bourguignat, 1864)
- † Acicula limbata Reuss, 1861
- Acicula lineata (Draparnaud, 1801) - type species, Aiguillette bordée
- Acicula lineolata (Pini, 1885)
- Acicula miaphene Subai, 2009
- † Acicula michaudiana Schlickum, 1975
- Acicula moussoni O. Boettger, 1879
- Acicula multilineata Boeters, E. Gittenberger & Subai, 1989
- † Acicula nanobelone Kadolsky, 2008
- Acicula norrisi O. Boettger, 1879
- Acicula palaestinensis Forcart, 1981
- Acicula parcelineata (Clessin, 1911)
- Acicula (Acicula) persica Subai, 1981
- † Acicula praediezi Kadolsky, 2008
- † Acicula pseudosturanii Kadolsky, 2008
- Acicula riedeli Boeters, E. Gittenberger & Subai, 1989
- † Acicula schlickumi (Schütt, 1967)
- † Acicula sturanii Schlickum & Strauch, 1979
- Acicula szigethyannae Subai, 1977
- Acicula telum Páll-Gergely, 2023
- Acicula vezzanii Bodon, 1994

Species brought into synonymy

- † Acicula bakanense Steklov, 1966: synonym of † Acicula parcelineata (Clessin, 1911) (junior subjective synonym)
- † Acicula callosa O. Boettger, 1870: synonym of † Platyla callosa (O. Boettger, 1870) (superseded combination)
- † Acicula (Acicula) irenae Schlickum, 1978: synonym of † Acicula edlaueri Schlickum, 1970
- Acicula lusitanica D. T. Holyoak & Seddon, 1985: synonym of Platyla lusitanica (D. T. Holyoak & Seddon, 1985) (original name)
- Acicula munzingerii (Jickeli, 1873): synonym of Subulina munzingerii (Jickeli, 1873)
- Acicula nekhaevi Schikov & Palatov, 2022 (interim unpublished, the original description is not Code compliant)
- Acicula spectabilis (Rossmässler, 1839): synonym of Renea spectabilis (Rossmässler, 1839) (unaccepted combination)

Nomen nudum

- † Acicula pseudocylichna De Stefani, 1880 †
