= Acicula norrisi =

Conservation status
- Vulnerable (IUCN 3.1)

Scientific classification
- Kingdom: Animalia
- Phylum: Mollusca
- Class: Gastropoda
- Subclass: Caenogastropoda
- Order: Architaenioglossa
- Family: Aciculidae
- Genus: Acicula
- Species: A. norrisi

Binomial name
- Acicula norrisi Gittenberger & Boeters, 1977

Species of gastropod

Acicula norrisi is a species of land snail in the family Aciculidae. It is native to Gibraltar. Some shells were recently found on the nearby Spanish mainland, indicating that there may be several populations there, as well.

Live specimens are not known; the species is known only from shell specimens. These have been found at four sites on Gibraltar and the new site in Spain. The animal probably lives under the soil and leaf litter.

The Spanish populations are critically endangered and one such might disappear.
