= Platyla peloponnesica =

Conservation status
- Vulnerable (IUCN 3.1)

Scientific classification
- Kingdom: Animalia
- Phylum: Mollusca
- Class: Gastropoda
- Subclass: Caenogastropoda
- Order: Architaenioglossa
- Family: Aciculidae
- Genus: Platyla
- Species: P. peloponnesica

Binomial name
- Platyla peloponnesica Boeters, Gittenberger & Subai, 1989

Species of gastropod

Platyla peloponnesica is a species of very small land snail with an operculum, a terrestrial gastropod mollusc or micromollusc in the family Aciculidae. This species is endemic to Greece.
