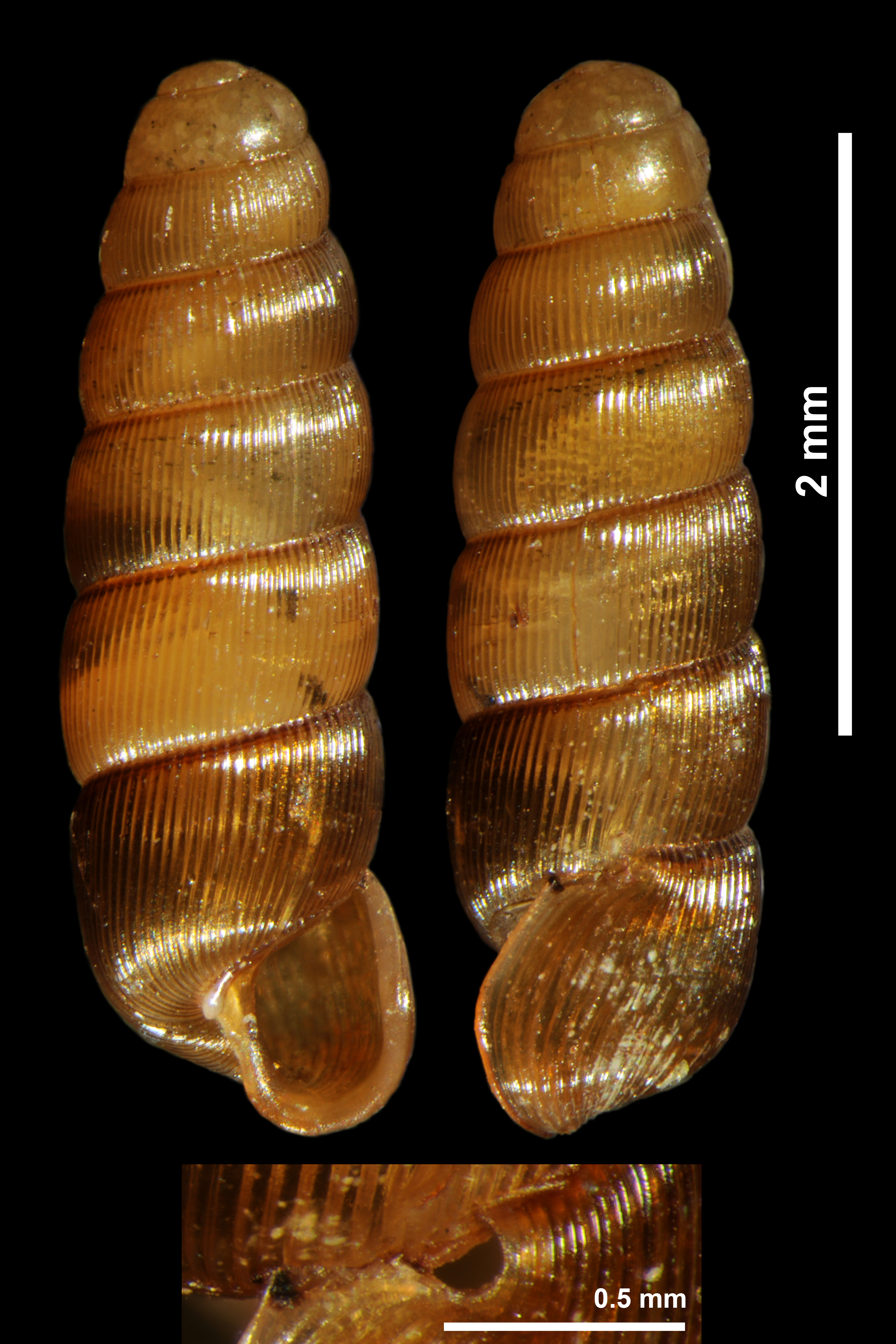
- Shell of Renea moutonii singularis (specimen at MNHN, Paris)

Conservation status
- Vulnerable (IUCN 2.3)

Scientific classification
- Kingdom: Animalia
- Phylum: Mollusca
- Class: Gastropoda
- Subclass: Caenogastropoda
- Order: Architaenioglossa
- Superfamily: Cyclophoroidea
- Family: Aciculidae
- Genus: Renea
- Species: R. moutonii
- Subspecies: R. m. singularis

Trinomial name
- Renea moutonii singularis Pollonera, 1905

Synonyms
- Caziotia singularis Pollonera, 1905 ·(basionym); Renea (Caziotia) singularis (Pollonera, 1905) (unaccepted combination and rank); Renea singularis (Pollonera, 1905); Renea singularis singularis (Pollonera, 1905)

= Renea moutonii singularis =

Species of gastropod

Renea moutonii singularis is a subspecies of land snail with an operculum, a terrestrial gastropod mollusk in the family Aciculidae. It was described by Pollonera in 1905. The common name is needle snail.

== Distribution ==
This subspecies is endemic to France. It has a very narrow distribution, being found only in the Alpes-Maritimes, in the Loup and Siagne valleys. Because of its limited distribution and rarity within its range it is considered threatened. The IUCN red list of endangered species lists it as vulnerable.

== Description ==
These snails are between 3 and 4 mm long and 1.1 to 1.3 mm wide. Their elongated shells are light brown with fine ribbing (60-70 ribs with a penultimate whorl). The apertural margin in lateral view is oblique / and (-shaped, with an exaggerated sinulus, and a P-like opening at the suture in the last quarter of the last whorl. There is no cervical callus. The apertural margin can be thick.

Renea moutonii singularis is possibly the end of an evolutionary line that begins with an almost straight apertural margin (in lateral view) towards a much more oblique and protruded margin with the needle snail having the longest sinulus along the suture.
