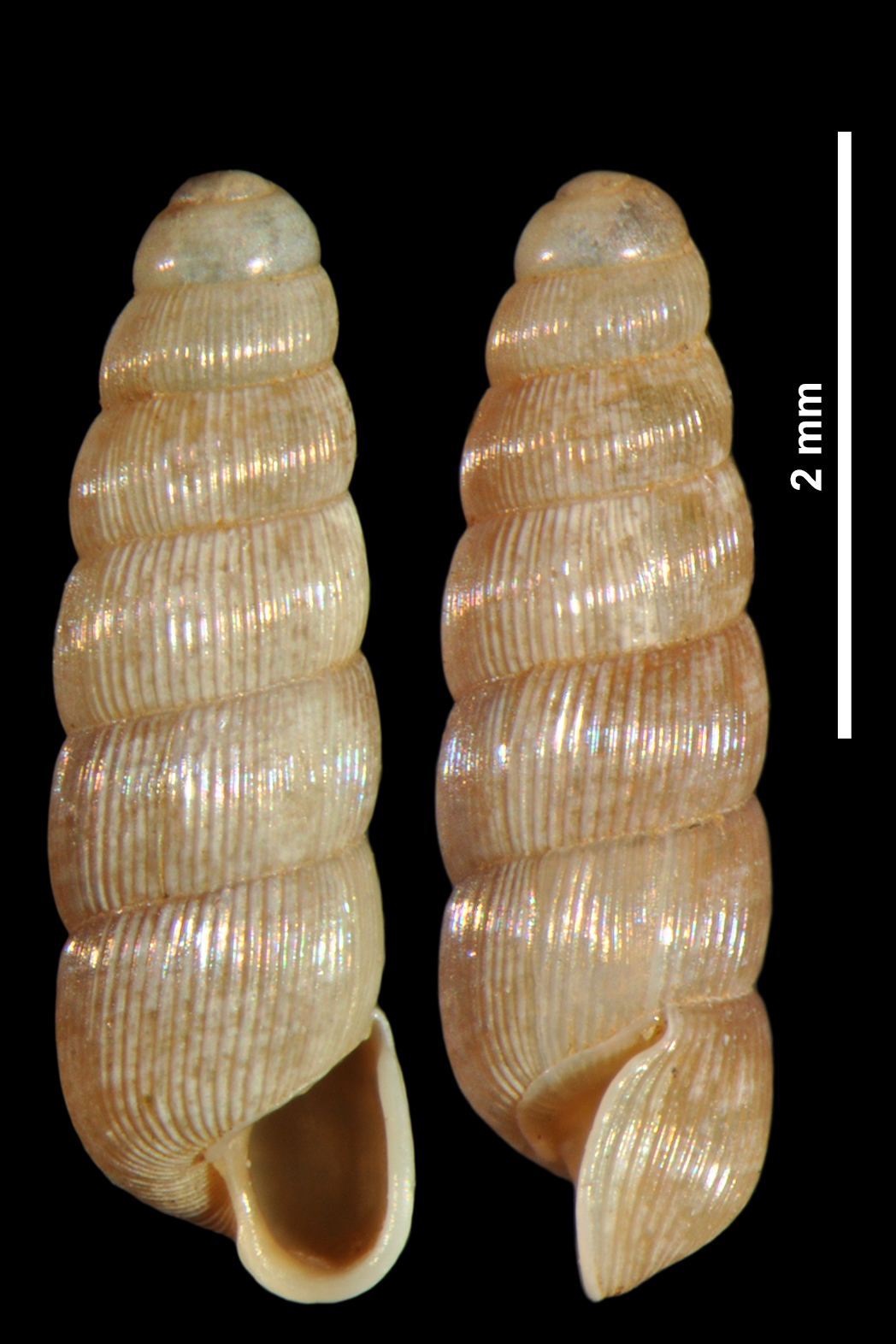
- Shell of Renea moutonii (specimen at MNHN, Paris)

Conservation status
- Near Threatened (IUCN 3.1)

Scientific classification
- Kingdom: Animalia
- Phylum: Mollusca
- Class: Gastropoda
- Subclass: Caenogastropoda
- Order: Architaenioglossa
- Superfamily: Cyclophoroidea
- Family: Aciculidae
- Genus: Renea
- Species: R. moutonii

Binomial name
- Renea moutonii (Dupuy, 1849)

Synonyms
- Acme moutonii Dupuy, 1849

= Renea moutonii =

Species of gastropod

Renea moutonii s a species of land snail with an operculum, a terrestrial gastropod mollusk in the family Aciculidae.

Subspecies

- Renea moutonii moutonii (Dupuy, 1849)
- Renea moutonii singularis (Pollonera, 1905)

== Distribution ==
This species is endemic to France and occurs in the Alpes-Maritimes,
