= Platyla microspira =

Conservation status
- Least Concern (IUCN 3.1)

Scientific classification
- Kingdom: Animalia
- Phylum: Mollusca
- Class: Gastropoda
- Subclass: Caenogastropoda
- Order: Architaenioglossa
- Superfamily: Cyclophoroidea
- Family: Aciculidae
- Genus: Platyla
- Species: P. microspira

Binomial name
- Platyla microspira (Pini, 1884)

Synonyms
- Acme microspira

Species of gastropod

Platyla microspira is a species of very small land snail with an operculum, a terrestrial gastropod mollusc or micromollusc in the family Aciculidae. This species is found in Italy and Romania.
