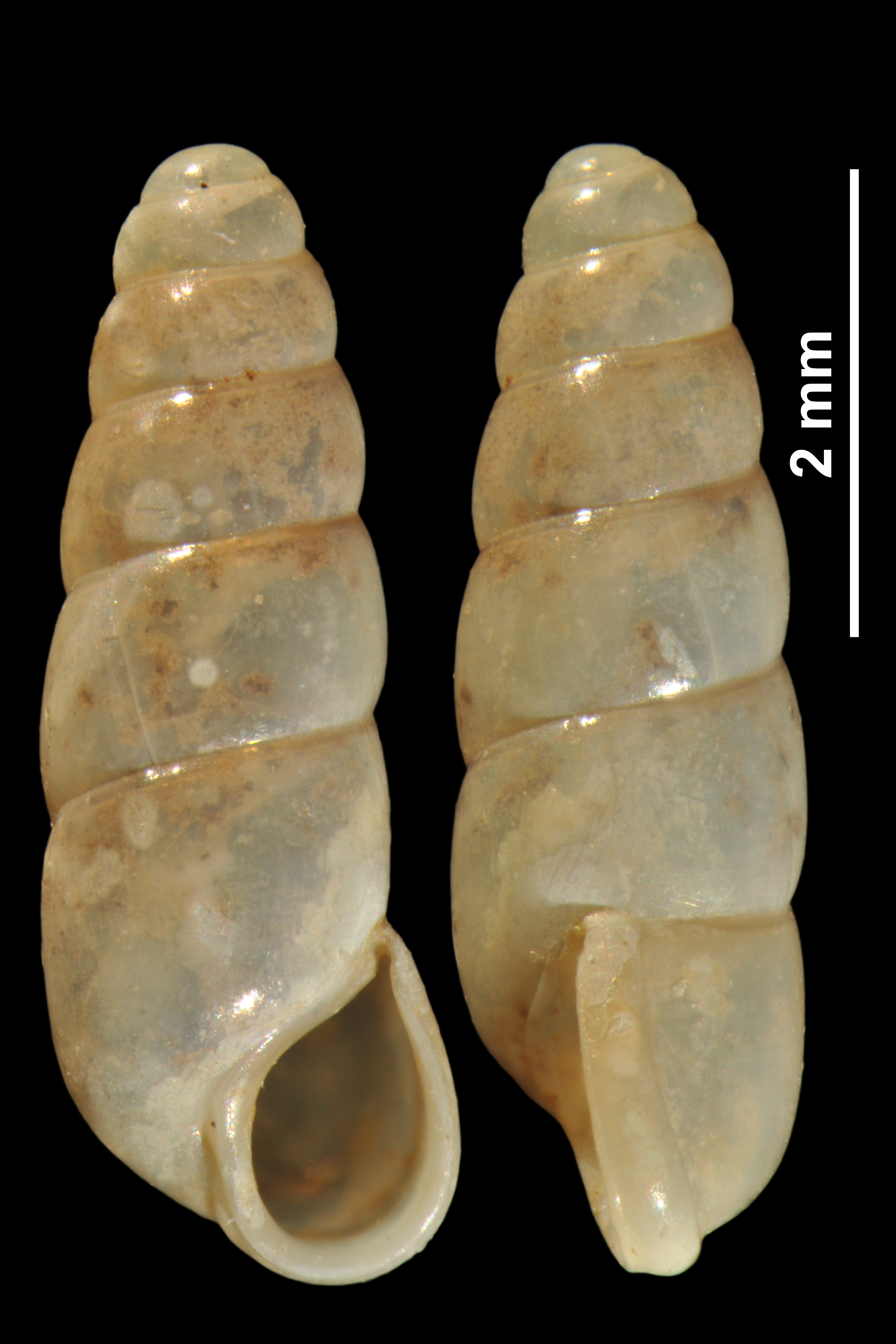
- Shell of Platyla foliniana (specimen at MNHN, Paris)

Conservation status
- Vulnerable (IUCN 3.1)

Scientific classification
- Kingdom: Animalia
- Phylum: Mollusca
- Class: Gastropoda
- Subclass: Caenogastropoda
- Order: Architaenioglossa
- Family: Aciculidae
- Genus: Platyla
- Species: P. foliniana

Binomial name
- Platyla foliniana (Nevill, 1879)

Synonyms
- Acme foliniana G. Nevill, 1879 (original combination); Acme foliniana var. emaciata G. Nevill, 1879 (variety); Acme foliniana var. pachystoma G. Nevill, 1879 (variety)

= Platyla foliniana =

Species of gastropod

Platyla foliniana is a species of very small land snail in the family Aciculidae.

== Distribution ==
It is endemic to France, where it is known only from Alpes-Maritimes.

This species lives mainly in moist deciduous forest habitat under leaf litter and ivy. It may also occur in drier habitat with a Mediterranean climate. Little is known about the life history of the species; it is mainly recorded from dead specimens. These have been found at only four locations within a total range of 16 square kilometers. Increasing urbanization in the area may be a threat to the species.
