= Acicula palaestinensis =

Conservation status
- Vulnerable (IUCN 2.3)

Scientific classification
- Kingdom: Animalia
- Phylum: Mollusca
- Class: Gastropoda
- Subclass: Caenogastropoda
- Order: Architaenioglossa
- Superfamily: Cyclophoroidea
- Family: Aciculidae
- Genus: Acicula
- Species: A. palaestinensis

Binomial name
- Acicula palaestinensis Forcart, 1981

Species of gastropod

Acicula palaestinensis is a species of very small land snail with an operculum, a terrestrial gastropod mollusk in the family Aciculidae.

This species is endemic to Israel.
