= Acicula hausdorfi =

Conservation status
- Least Concern (IUCN 3.1)

Scientific classification
- Kingdom: Animalia
- Phylum: Mollusca
- Class: Gastropoda
- Subclass: Caenogastropoda
- Order: Architaenioglossa
- Family: Aciculidae
- Genus: Acicula
- Species: A. hausdorfi

Binomial name
- Acicula hausdorfi Boeters, Gittenberger & Subai, 1989

Species of gastropod

Acicula hausdorfi is a species of very small land snail with an operculum. It is a terrestrial gastropod mollusk in the family Aciculidae.

== Distribution ==
This species is endemic to Greece. It's estimated Extent of occurrence is 972 km^{2}
