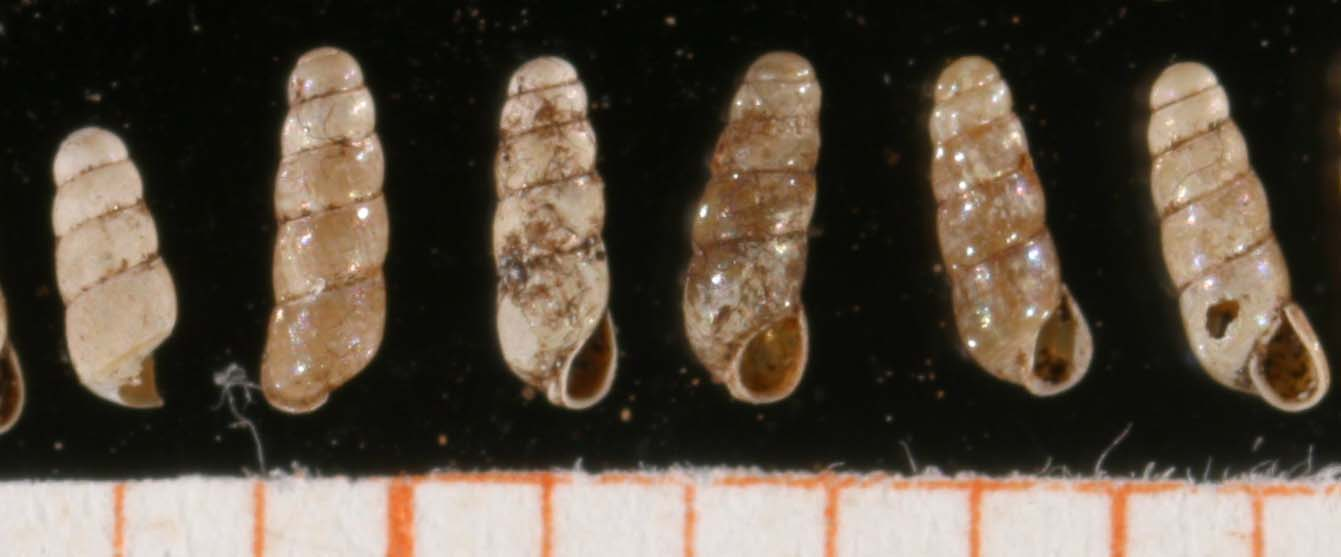

Scientific classification
- Kingdom: Animalia
- Phylum: Mollusca
- Class: Gastropoda
- Subclass: Caenogastropoda
- Order: Architaenioglossa
- Family: Aciculidae
- Genus: Platyla
- Species: P. gracilis

Binomial name
- Platyla gracilis (Clessin, 1877)

= Platyla gracilis =

Species of gastropod

Platyla gracilis is a species of gastropod belonging to the family Aciculidae.

The species is found in Central Europe.

The species has cosmopolitan distribution.
