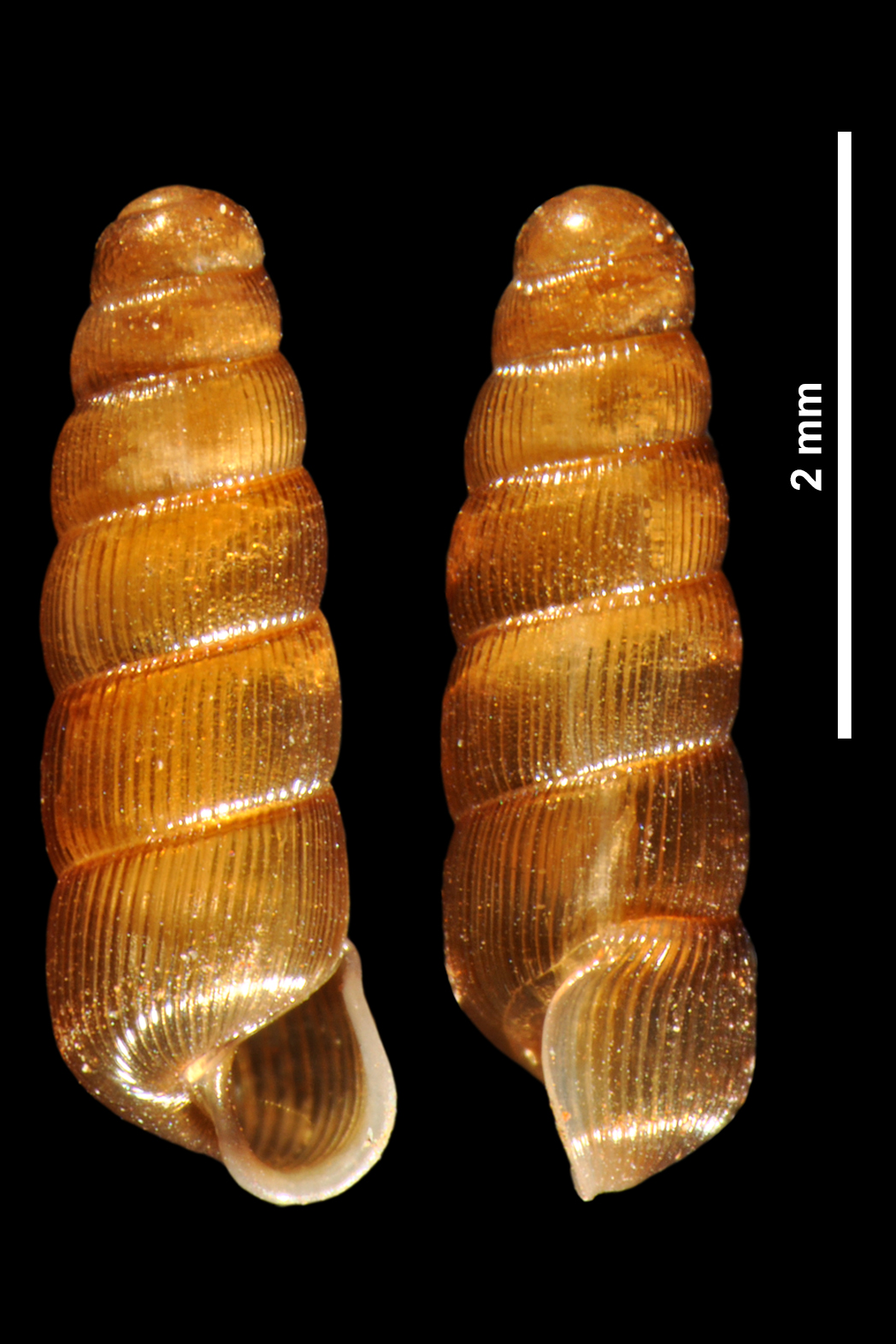
- Shell of Renea paillona (specimen at MNHN, Paris)

Conservation status
- Vulnerable (IUCN 3.1)

Scientific classification
- Kingdom: Animalia
- Phylum: Mollusca
- Class: Gastropoda
- Subclass: Caenogastropoda
- Order: Architaenioglossa
- Family: Aciculidae
- Genus: Renea
- Species: R. paillona

Binomial name
- Renea paillona Boeters & Gittenberger, 1989

= Renea paillona =

Species of gastropod

Renea paillona is a species of land snail in the family Aciculidae. It is native to France and Italy.

== Distribution ==
This snail lives in moist deciduous forest habitat under leaf litter and ivy. It is known from only four locations around Nice and just over the border in Italy. It may be threatened by urbanization in the area.
