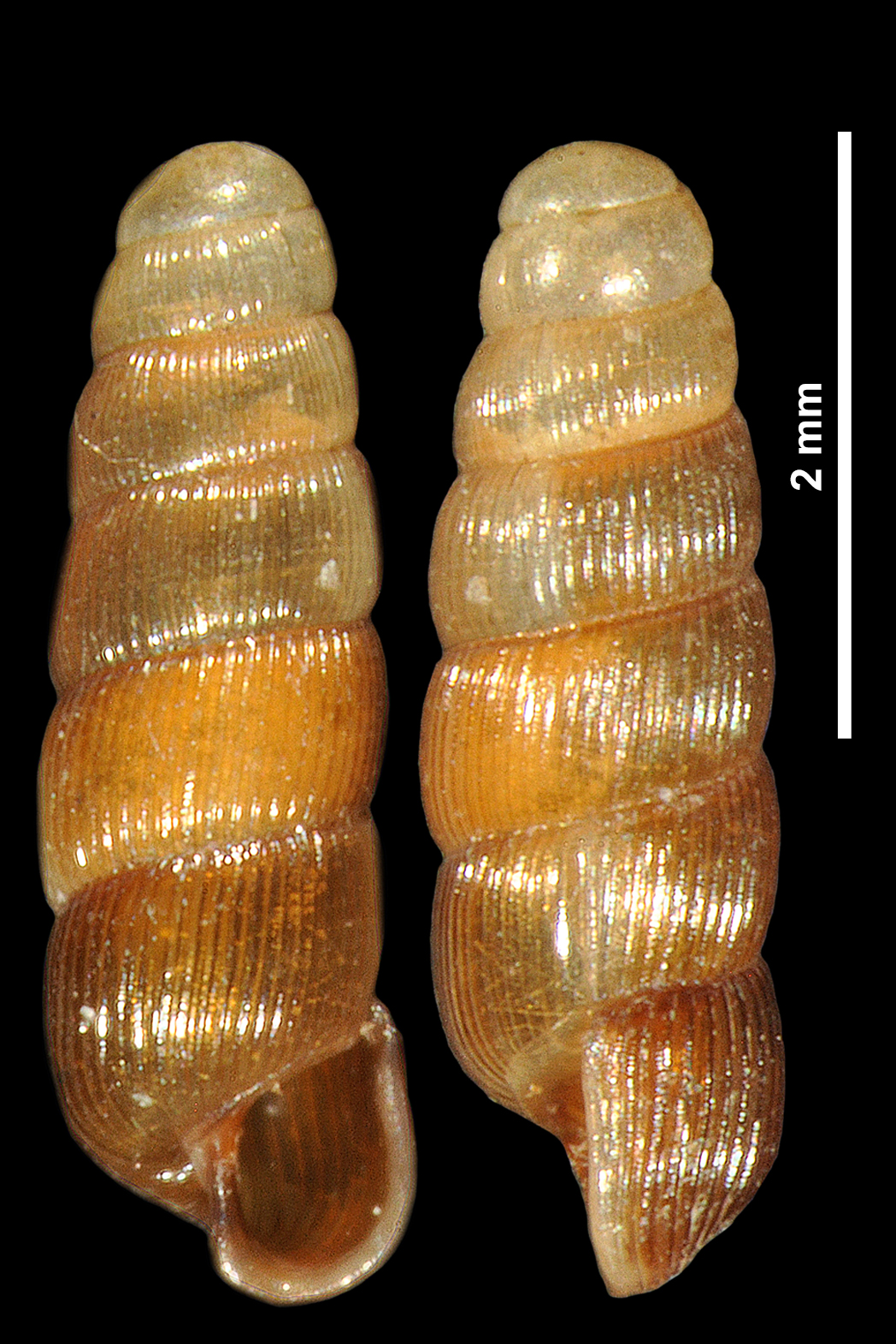
- Shell of Renea gormonti (specimen at MNHN, Paris)

Conservation status
- Endangered (IUCN 3.1)

Scientific classification
- Kingdom: Animalia
- Phylum: Mollusca
- Class: Gastropoda
- Subclass: Caenogastropoda
- Order: Architaenioglossa
- Family: Aciculidae
- Genus: Renea
- Species: R. gormonti

Binomial name
- Renea gormonti Boeters & Gittenberger, 1989

= Renea gormonti =

Species of gastropod

Renea gormonti is a species of land snail with an operculum, a terrestrial gastropod mollusk in the family Aciculidae. This species is endemic to France.

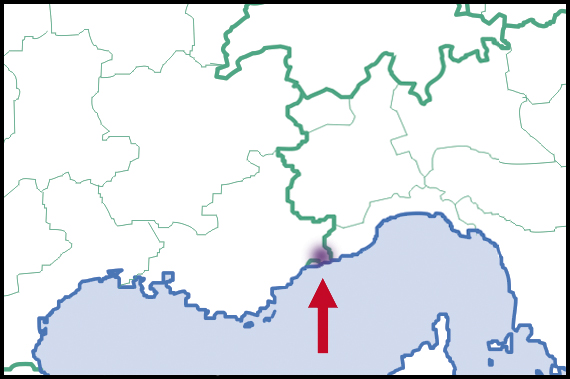
Distribution of Renea gormonti

== Distribution ==
This species occurs in the Alpes-Maritimes, France.
