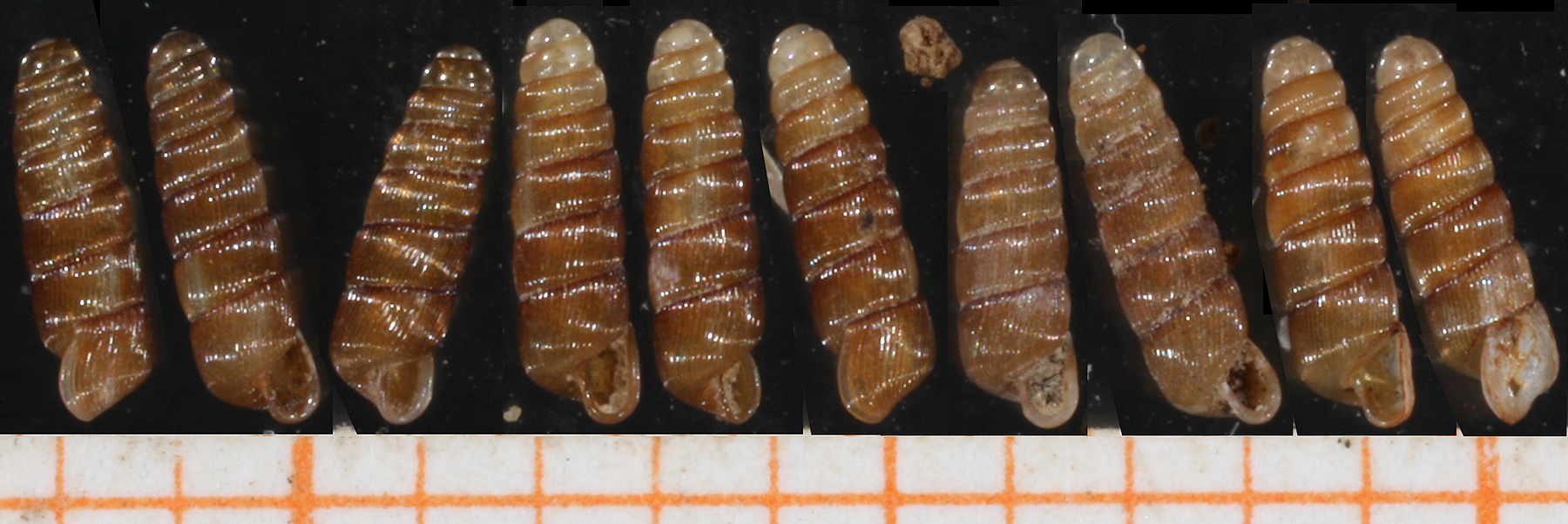

Conservation status
- Critically Endangered (IUCN 3.1)

Scientific classification
- Kingdom: Animalia
- Phylum: Mollusca
- Class: Gastropoda
- Subclass: Caenogastropoda
- Order: Architaenioglossa
- Family: Aciculidae
- Genus: Renea
- Species: R. bourguignatiana

Binomial name
- Renea bourguignatiana Nevill, 1880

= Renea bourguignatiana =

Species of gastropod

Renea bourguignatiana is a species of land snail with an operculum, a terrestrial gastropod mollusk in the family Aciculidae. The survival of this species is threatened by habitat loss.
