= Platyla orthostoma =

Conservation status
- Near Threatened (IUCN 3.1)

Scientific classification
- Kingdom: Animalia
- Phylum: Mollusca
- Class: Gastropoda
- Subclass: Caenogastropoda
- Order: Architaenioglossa
- Superfamily: Cyclophoroidea
- Family: Aciculidae
- Genus: Platyla
- Species: P. orthostoma

Binomial name
- Platyla orthostoma (Jankiewicz, 1979)

Synonyms
- Acicula (Platyla) orthostoma Jankiewicz, 1979

Species of gastropod

Platyla orthostoma is a species of very small land snail with an operculum, a terrestrial gastropod mollusc or micromollusc in the family Aciculidae. This species is endemic to Bulgaria.
