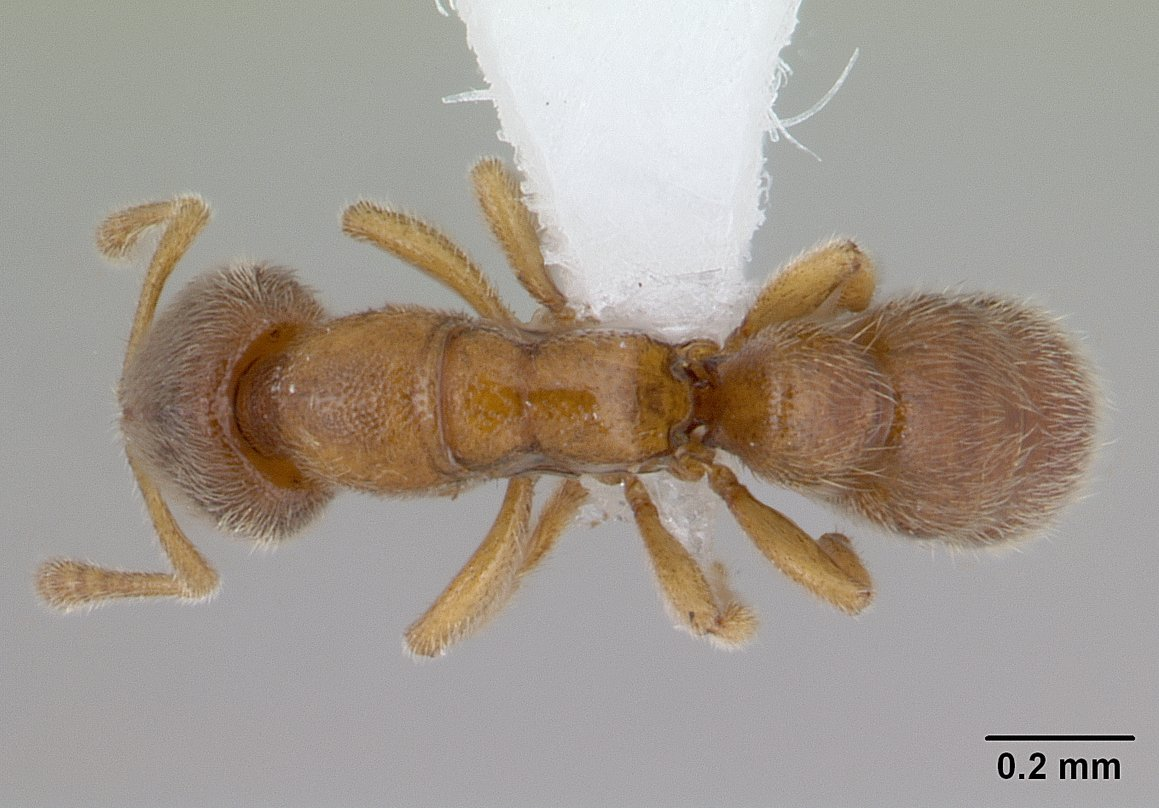

Scientific classification
- Kingdom: Animalia
- Phylum: Arthropoda
- Class: Insecta
- Order: Hymenoptera
- Family: Formicidae
- Genus: Prionopelta
- Species: P. robynmae

Binomial name
- Prionopelta robynmae Shattuck, S. O., 2008

= Prionopelta robynmae =

Species of ant

Prionopelta robynmae is a species of ant in the genus Prionopelta. It was discovered and described by Shattuck, S. O. in 2008, and is endemic to Australia.
