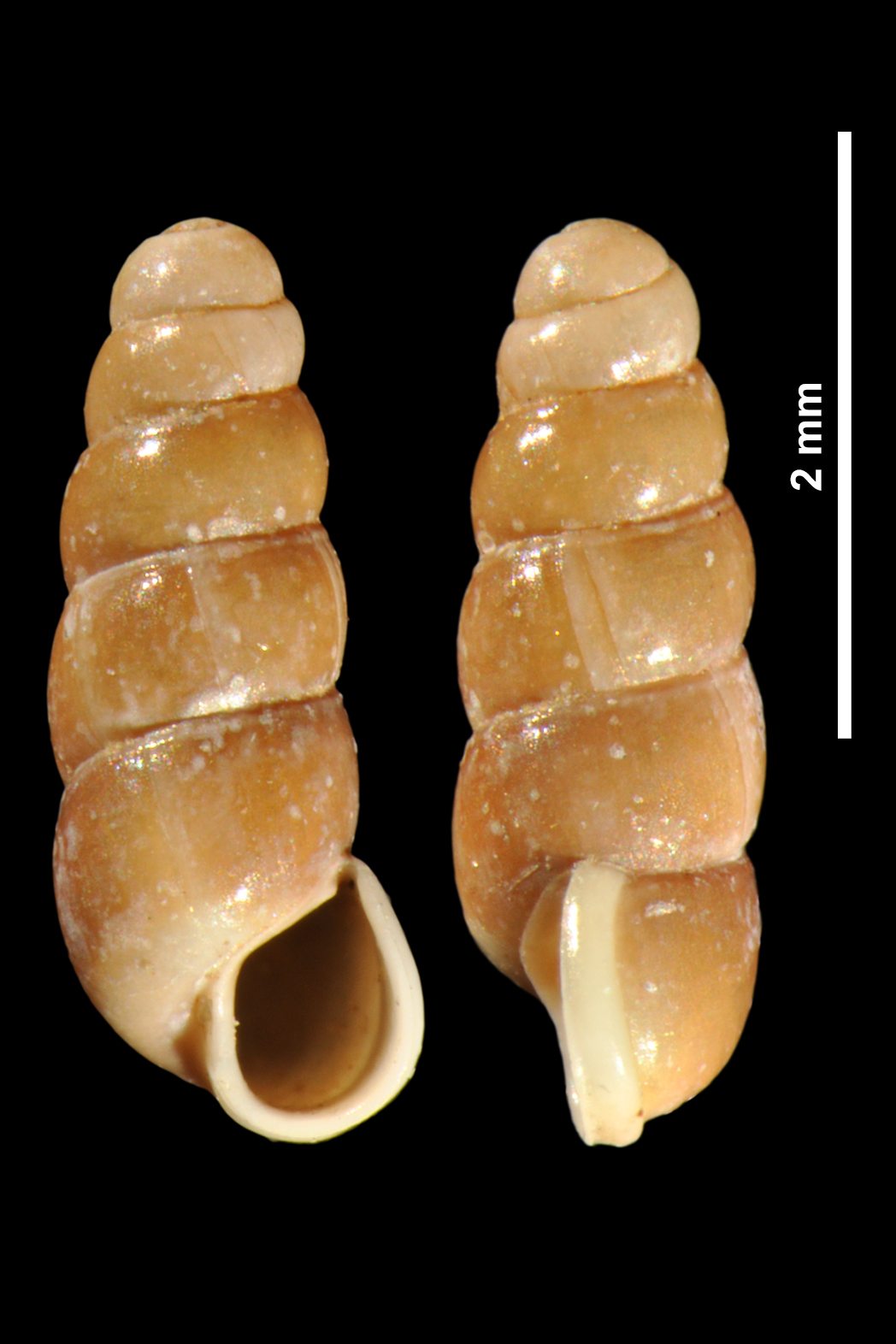
- Shells of Platyla polita (specimen at MNHN, Paris)

Conservation status
- Least Concern (IUCN 3.1)

Scientific classification
- Kingdom: Animalia
- Phylum: Mollusca
- Class: Gastropoda
- Subclass: Caenogastropoda
- Order: Architaenioglossa
- Family: Aciculidae
- Genus: Platyla
- Species: P. polita

Binomial name
- Platyla polita (Hartmann, 1840)

Synonyms
- Acicula (Platyla) polita (W. Hartmann, 1840) (unaccepted combination); † Acme (Acicula) diluviana Hocker, 1907 (junior synonym); Acme delpretei Paulucci, 1881 (junior synonym); Acme oedogyra Paladilhe, 1868 (original combination); Acme serbica Clessin, 1911 (junior synonym); Acme similis Reinhardt, 1880 (original combination); Acme similis bulgarica A. J. Wagner, 1928 (junior synonym); Acme transsilvanica A. J. Wagner, 1912 (junior synonym); Carychium lineatum C. Pfeiffer, 1828 (preoccupied); Cyclostoma lubricum Held, 1847 (junior synonym); Hyalacme beieri Käufel, 1930 (junior synonym); Platyla oedogyra (Paladilhe, 1868) (junior synonym); Platyla similis (Reinhardt, 1880) (junior synonym); Truncatella (Pupula) acicularis polita W. Hartmann, 1840 (original combination); Truncatella lubrica Held, 1847 (junior synonym)

= Platyla polita =

Species of gastropod

Platyla polita is a species of very small land snail with an operculum, a terrestrial gastropod mollusc or micromollusc in the family Aciculidae.

Subspecies

- Platyla polita polita (W. Hartmann, 1840)
- Platyla polita regina (Subai, 1977)

== Distribution ==
This species is found in the Czech Republic, Slovakia, Poland, the Netherlands, Ukraine, in alluvial sediments of the Rhône River, France and others.
