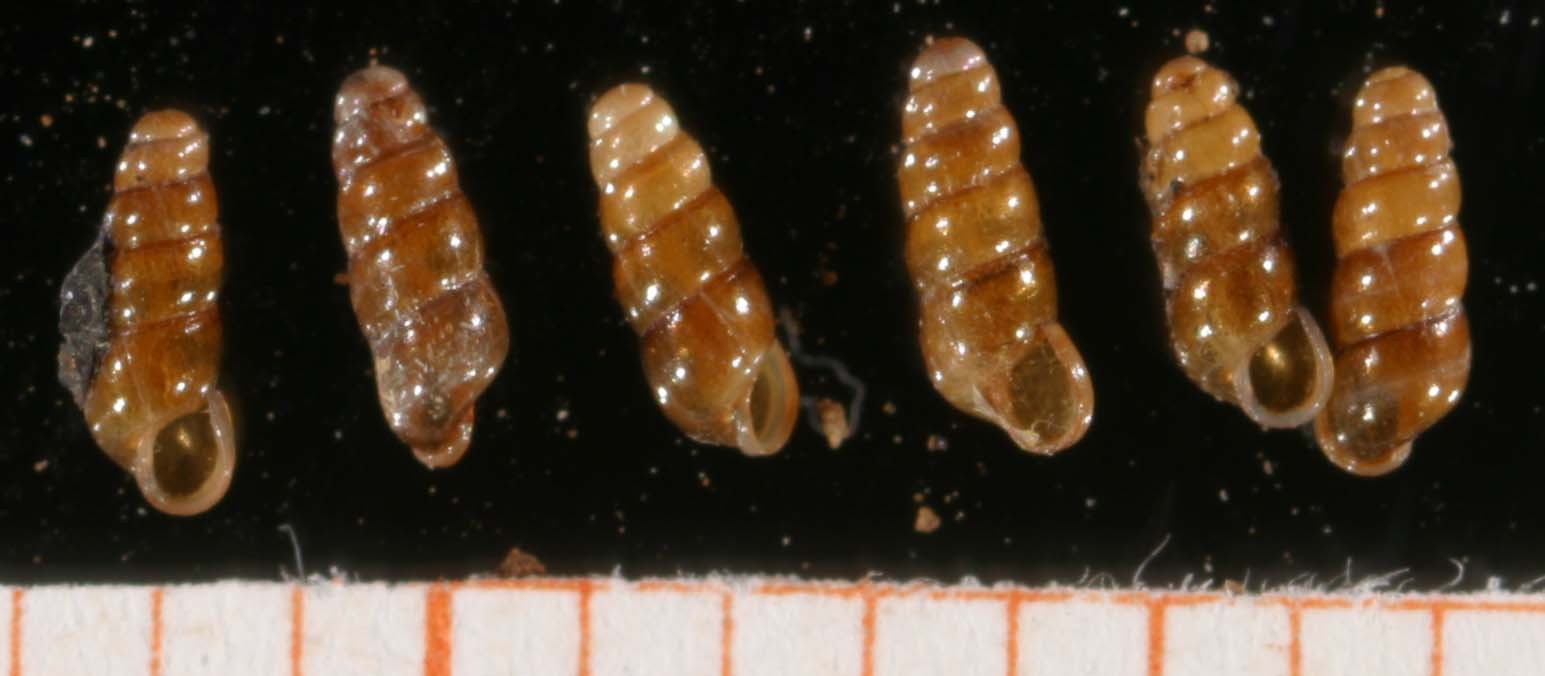
- Six shells of Platyla polita

Scientific classification
- Domain: Eukaryota
- Kingdom: Animalia
- Phylum: Mollusca
- Class: Gastropoda
- Subclass: Caenogastropoda
- Order: Architaenioglossa
- Superfamily: Cyclophoroidea
- Family: Aciculidae
- Genus: Platyla; Moquin-Tandon, 1856

Type species
- Acme dupuyi Paladilhe, 1868

Synonyms
- Acicula (Hyalacme) P. Hesse, 1917; Acicula (Platyla) Moquin-Tandon, 1856 (unaccepted rank); Acme (Hyalacme) P. Hesse, 1917 (junior synonym); Acme (Platyla) Moquin-Tandon, 1856 (original rank); Hyalacme P. Hesse, 1917

= Platyla =

Genus of land snails

Platyla is a genus of very small land snails with an operculum, terrestrial gastropod molluscs or micromolluscs in the family Aciculidae.

== Species ==
Species within the genus Platyla include:

- Platyla albanica Subai, 2012
- † Platyla alta (Clessin, 1911)
- Platyla banatica (Rossmässler, 1842)
- † Platyla beatricis (Gaál, 1910)
- † Platyla callosa (O. Boettger, 1870)
- † Platyla callosiuscula (Andreae, 1904)
- Platyla callostoma (Clessin, 1911)
- † Platyla conica (Michaud, 1862)
- Platyla cryptomena (de Folin & Bérillon, 1877)
- Platyla curtii (A. J. Wagner, 1912)
- Platyla dupuyi (Paladilhe, 1868)
- Platyla elisabethae (L. Pintér & Szigethy, 1973)
- † Platyla eocaena (Oppenheim, 1895)
- † Platyla falkneri Boeters, E. Gittenberger & Subai, 1989
- Platyla feheri Subai, 2009
- Platyla foliniana (G. Nevill, 1879)
- Platyla gracilis (Clessin, 1877)
- Platyla hedionda Torres Alba, 2012
- Platyla jankowskiana (Jackiewicz, 1979)
- Platyla jordai Altaba, 2013
- † Platyla klemmi (Schlickum & Strauch, 1972)
- Platyla lusitanica (D. T. Holyoak & Seddon, 1985)
- Platyla maasseni Boeters, E. Gittenberger & Subai, 1989
- † Platyla manganellii Harzhauser, Neubauer & Esu in Harzhauser et al., 2015
- Platyla merillaensis Quiñonero-Salgado, Ruiz Cobo & Rolán, 2017
- Platyla microspira (Pini, 1885)
- Platyla minutissima Boeters, E. Gittenberger & Subai, 1989
- Platyla orthostoma (Jackiewicz, 1979)
- Platyla peloponnesica Boeters, E. Gittenberger & Subai, 1989
- Platyla perpusilla (Reinhardt, 1880)
- Platyla pezzolii Boeters, E. Gittenberger & Subai, 1989
- Platyla pinteri (Subai, 1976)
- Platyla polita (W. Hartmann, 1840)
- Platyla procax Boeters, E. Gittenberger & Subai, 1989
- Platyla sardoa Cianfanelli, Talenti, Bodon & Manganelli, 2000
- Platyla similis (Reinhardt, 1880)
- Platyla stussineri (O. Boettger, 1884)
- Platyla subdiaphana (Bivona, 1839)
- † Platyla subfusca (Flach, 1889)
- † Platyla subpolita (Gottschick, 1921)
- Platyla talentii Bodon & Cianfanelli, 2008
- Platyla turcica Boeters, E. Gittenberger & Subai, 1989
- Platyla wilhelmi (A. J. Wagner, 1910)

Synonyms

- Platyla ceraunorum A. Reischütz, N. Steiner-Reischütz & P. L. Reischütz, 2016: synonym of Platyla similis (Reinhardt, 1880) (junior subjective synonym)
- Platyla corpulenta Subai, 2009: synonym of Platyla procax Boeters, E. Gittenberger & Subai, 1989 (junior subjective synonym)
- Platyla oedogyra (Paladilhe, 1868): synonym of Platyla polita (W. Hartmann, 1840) (junior synonym)
