= Platyla lusitanica =

Conservation status
- Endangered (IUCN 3.1)

Scientific classification
- Kingdom: Animalia
- Phylum: Mollusca
- Class: Gastropoda
- Subclass: Caenogastropoda
- Order: Architaenioglossa
- Family: Aciculidae
- Genus: Platyla
- Species: P. lusitanica

Binomial name
- Platyla lusitanica Holyoak & Seddon, 1985

Species of gastropod

Platyla lusitanica is a species of very small land snail with an operculum, a terrestrial gastropod mollusc or micromollusc in the family Aciculidae. This species is endemic to Portugal.
