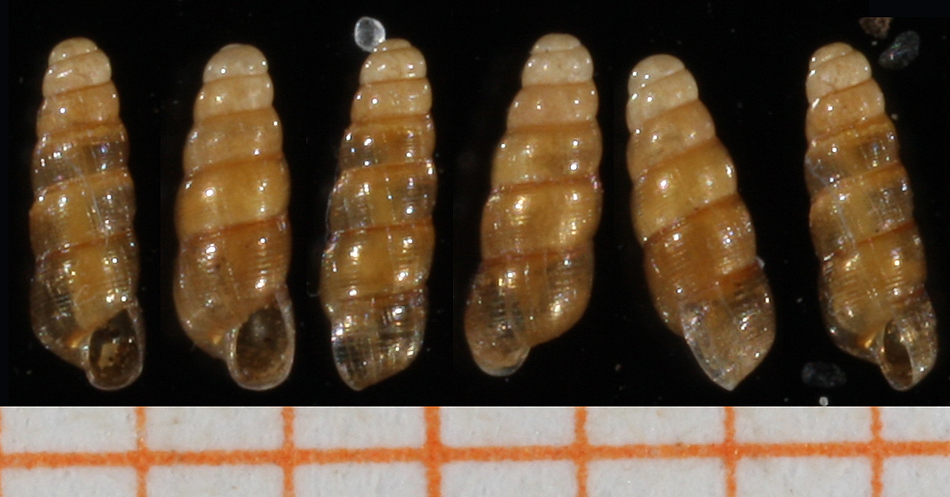
- Menkia horsti

Scientific classification
- Kingdom: Animalia
- Phylum: Mollusca
- Class: Gastropoda
- Subclass: Caenogastropoda
- Order: Architaenioglossa
- Family: Aciculidae
- Genus: Menkia; Boeters, Gittenberger & Subai, 1985

= Menkia =

Genus of land snails

Menkia is a genus of gastropods belonging to the family Aciculidae.

The species of this genus are found in Pyrenees.

Species:

- Menkia celleneuva Boeters, Gittenberger & Subai, 1985
- Menkia dewinteri Gittenberger, 1991
- Menkia horsti Boeters, Gittenberger & Subai, 1985
- Menkia rolani Gittenberger, 1991
