= Prionopelta media =

Scientific classification
- Domain: Eukaryota
- Kingdom: Animalia
- Phylum: Arthropoda
- Class: Insecta
- Order: Hymenoptera
- Family: Formicidae
- Genus: Prionopelta
- Species: P. media

Binomial name
- Prionopelta media Shattuck, S. O., 2008

Species of ant

Prionopelta media is a species of ant, discovered and described by Shattuck, S. O. in 2008. It can be found in Papua New Guinea.
