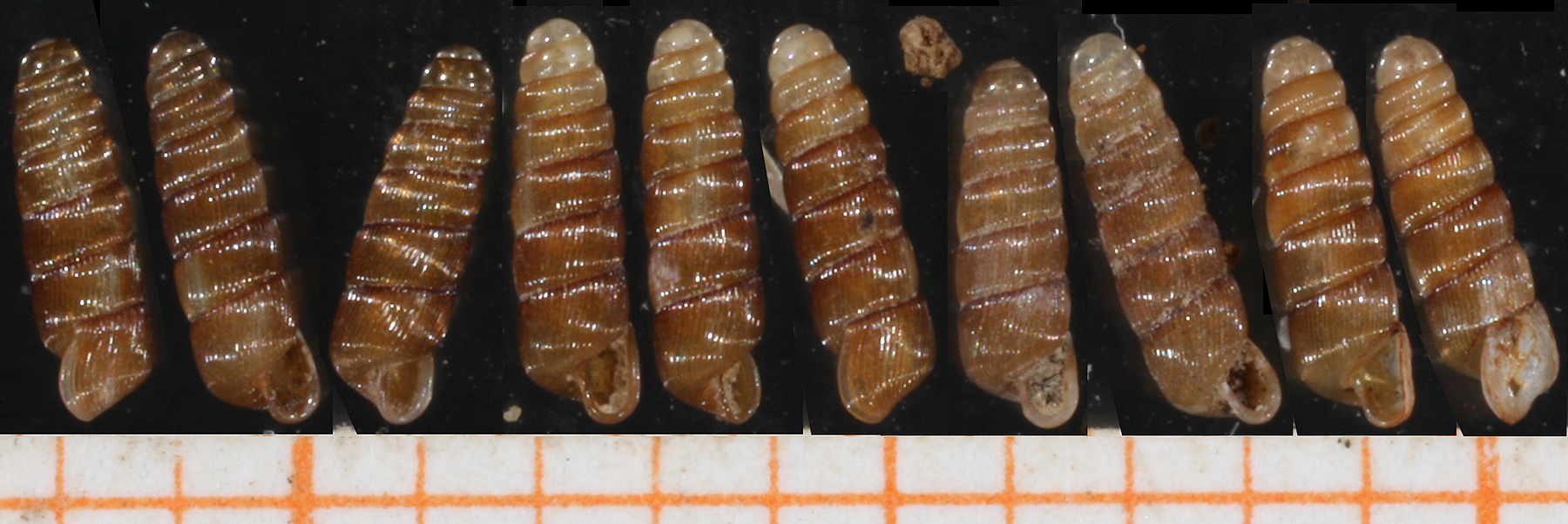

Scientific classification
- Kingdom: Animalia
- Phylum: Mollusca
- Class: Gastropoda
- Subclass: Caenogastropoda
- Order: Architaenioglossa
- Superfamily: Cyclophoroidea
- Family: Aciculidae
- Genus: Renea; Nevill, 1880

Type species
- Renea bourguignatiana G. Nevill, 1880

Synonyms
- Caziotia Pollonera, 1905; Megalacme Kobelt & Möllendorff, 1899; Microceras F. Sandberger, 1886 (Invalid: junior homonym of...); Pleuracme Kobelt, 1894 † (junior synonym); † Pseudotruncatella Andreae, 1904 (junior synonym); Renea (Caziotia) Pollonera, 1905; Renea (Pleuracme) Kobelt, 1894 (junior subjective synonym)

= Renea (gastropod) =

Genus of gastropods

Renea is a genus of air-breathing land snails with an operculum, terrestrial gastropod mollusks in the family Aciculidae.

== Species ==
Species within the genus Renea include:

- Renea berica Niero, Nardi & Braccia, 2012
- Renea bourguignatiana G. Nevill, 1880 - type species
- Renea caucasica
- Renea elegantissima (Pini, 1886)
- Renea gentilei (Pollonera, 1889)
- Renea gormonti Boeters, E. Gittenberger & Subai, 1989
- Renea kobelti (A. J. Wagner, 1910)
- † Renea leobersdorfensis (Wenz, 1921)
- † Renea microceras (A. Braun in Walchner, 1851)
- Renea moutonii (Dupuy, 1849)
- Renea paillona Boeters, E. Gittenberger & Subai, 1989
- † Renea pretiosa (Andreae, 1904)
- † Renea saccoi Ciangherotti & Esu, 2005
- Renea spectabilis (Rossmässler, 1839)
- Renea veneta (Pirona, 1865)

Synonyms

- Renea douctouyrensis Bertrand, 2004: synonym of Acicula douctouyrensis (Bertrand, 2004) (original combination)
- Renea singularis (Pollonera, 1905): synonym of Renea moutonii singularis (Pollonera, 1905)
