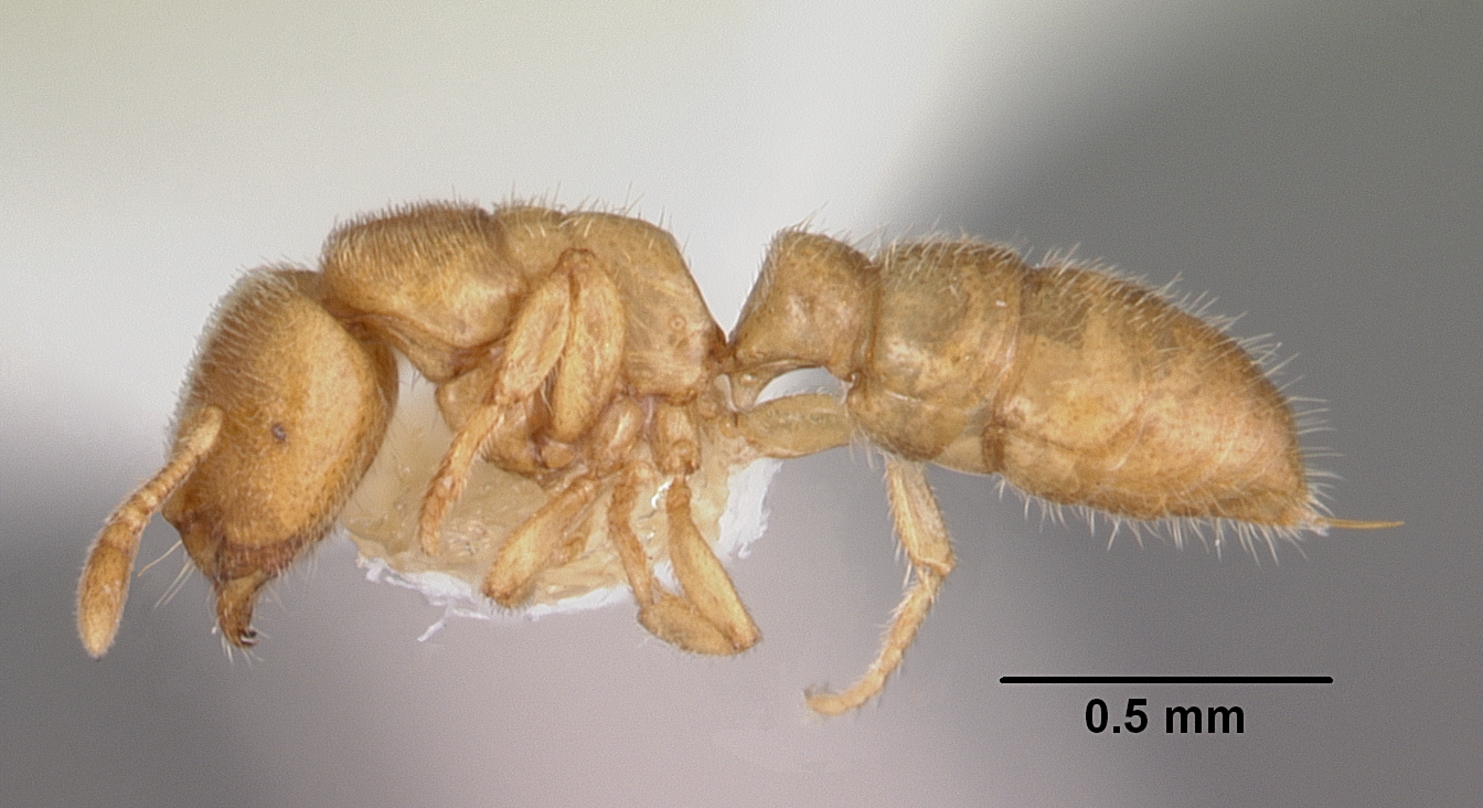
- Prionopelta punctulata worker

Scientific classification
- Domain: Eukaryota
- Kingdom: Animalia
- Phylum: Arthropoda
- Class: Insecta
- Order: Hymenoptera
- Family: Formicidae
- Subfamily: Amblyoponinae
- Tribe: Amblyoponini
- Genus: Prionopelta; Mayr, 1866

Type species
- Prionopelta punctulata Mayr, 1866

Diversity
- 15 species

Synonyms
- Examblyopone Donisthorpe, 1949; Renea Donisthorpe, 1947

= Prionopelta =

Genus of ants

Prionopelta is a genus of ants in the subfamily Amblyoponinae. Of its 15 species, four are known from Africa, five from the Americas and six from the Indo-Pacific region.

== Species ==
- Prionopelta aethiopica Arnold, 1949
- Prionopelta amabilis Borgmeier, 1949
- Prionopelta amieti Terron, 1974
- Prionopelta antillana Forel, 1909
- Prionopelta brocha Wilson, 1958
- Prionopelta descarpentriesi Santschi, 1924
- Prionopelta humicola Terron, 1974
- Prionopelta kraepelini Forel, 1905
- Prionopelta majuscula Emery, 1897
- Prionopelta marthae Forel, 1909
- Prionopelta media Shattuck, 2008
- Prionopelta modesta Forel, 1909
- Prionopelta opaca Emery, 1897
- Prionopelta punctulata Mayr, 1866
- Prionopelta robynmae Shattuck, 2008
