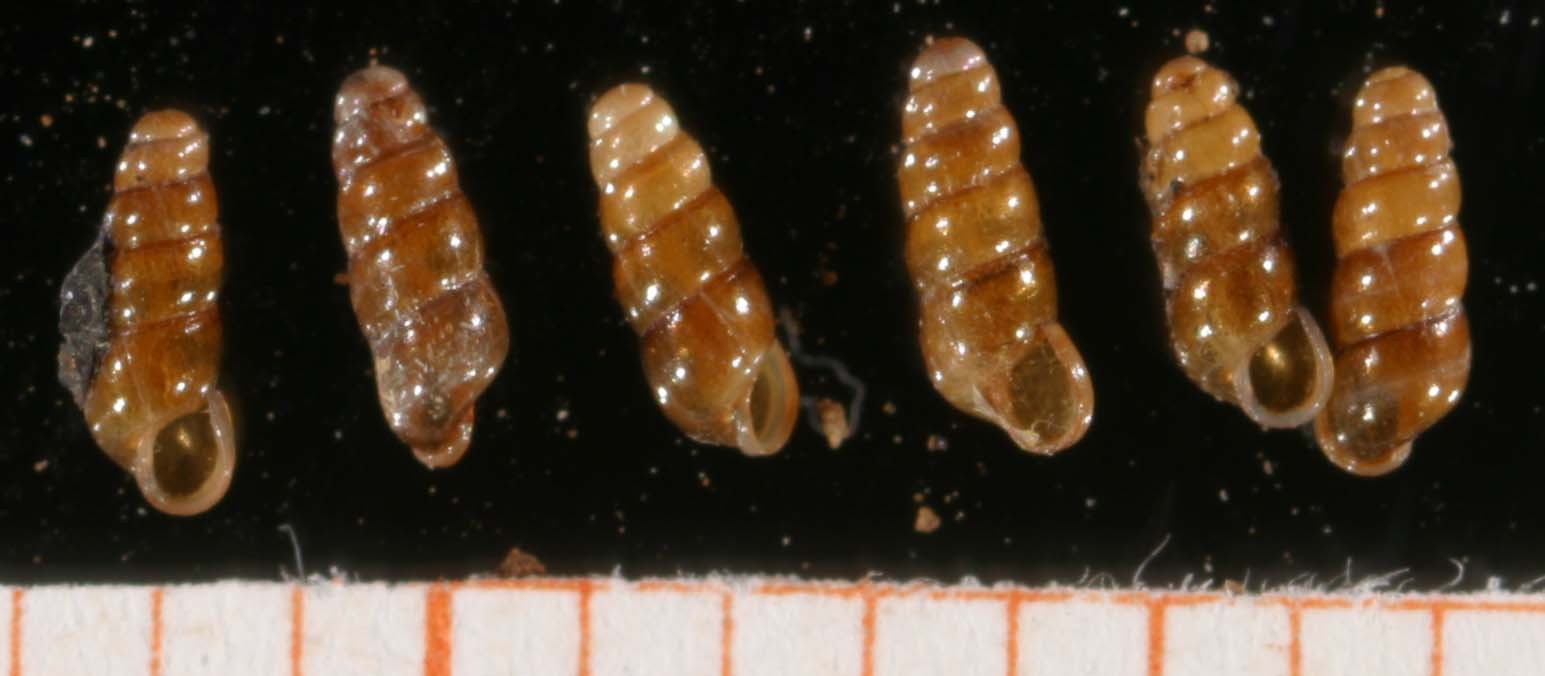
- Platyla polita

Scientific classification
- Kingdom: Animalia
- Phylum: Mollusca
- Class: Gastropoda
- Subclass: Caenogastropoda
- Order: Architaenioglossa
- Superfamily: Cyclophoroidea
- Family: Aciculidae; J. E. Gray, 1850

Synonyms
- Acmaeidae Pollonera, 1905 (inv.)

= Aciculidae =

Family of gastropods

The Aciculidae are a family of small land snails that have the Luna opercula.

Even though Aciculidae are land snails, they live in rather wet conditions, among mosses and dead leaves and they have sometimes been described as "winkles come ashore".

== Taxonomy ==
Previously this family was placed in the infraorder Littorinimorpha, in the suborder Hypsogastropoda in the order Sorbeoconcha in the taxonomy of the Gastropoda by Ponder & Lindberg (1997).

The family Aciculidae is in the informal group Architaenioglossa, belonging to the clade Caenogastropoda, (according to the taxonomy of the Gastropoda by Bouchet & Rocroi, 2005). This family has no subfamilies according to the taxonomy of the Gastropoda by Bouchet & Rocroi, 2005.

In the Taxonomy of the Gastropoda (Bouchet et al., 2017), it was placed under Cyclophoroidea.

== Genera ==
Genera within the family Aciculidae include:

- Acicula W. Hartmann, 1821 - the needle snail, type genus
- Menkia Boeters, E. Gittenberger & Subai, 1985
- Platyla Moquin-Tandon, 1856
- Renea Nevill, 1880
- Cretatortulosa gignens 2020
