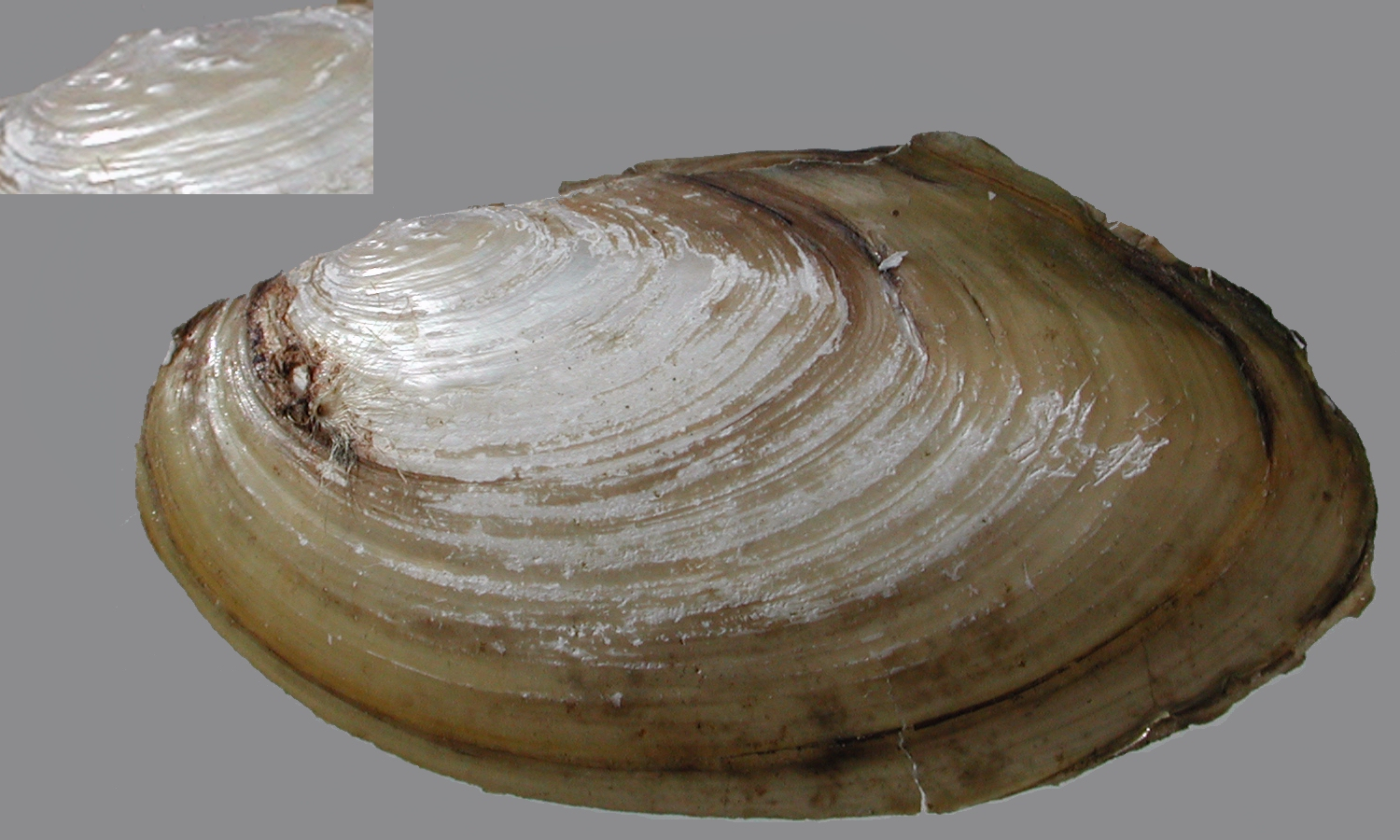
- Left valve of Pseudanodonta complanata showing close-up of rugae on the umbo

Conservation status
- Endangered (IUCN 3.1)

Scientific classification
- Kingdom: Animalia
- Phylum: Mollusca
- Class: Bivalvia
- Order: Unionida
- Family: Unionidae
- Genus: Pseudanodonta
- Species: P. complanata

Binomial name
- Pseudanodonta complanata (Rossmässler, 1835)
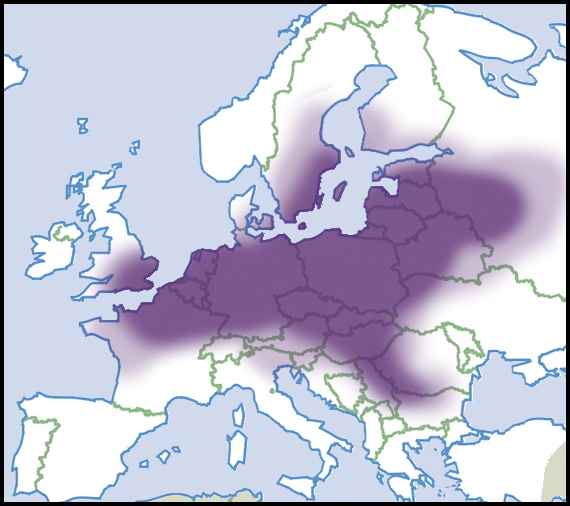
- Distribution of Pseudanodonta complanata in Europe.

Synonyms
- Anodonta complanata Rossmässler, 1835

= Depressed river mussel =

Species of bivalve

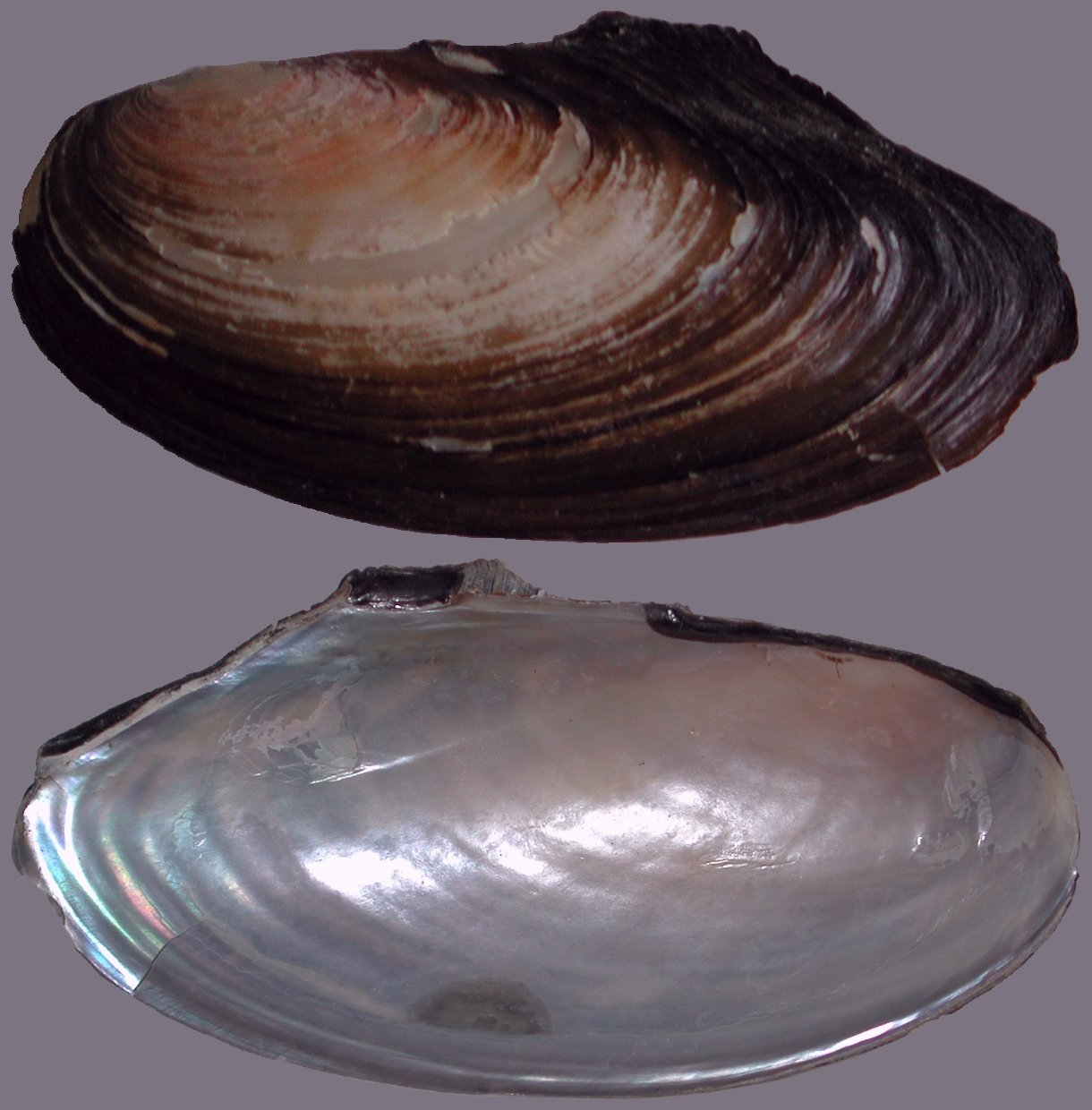
The depressed river mussel

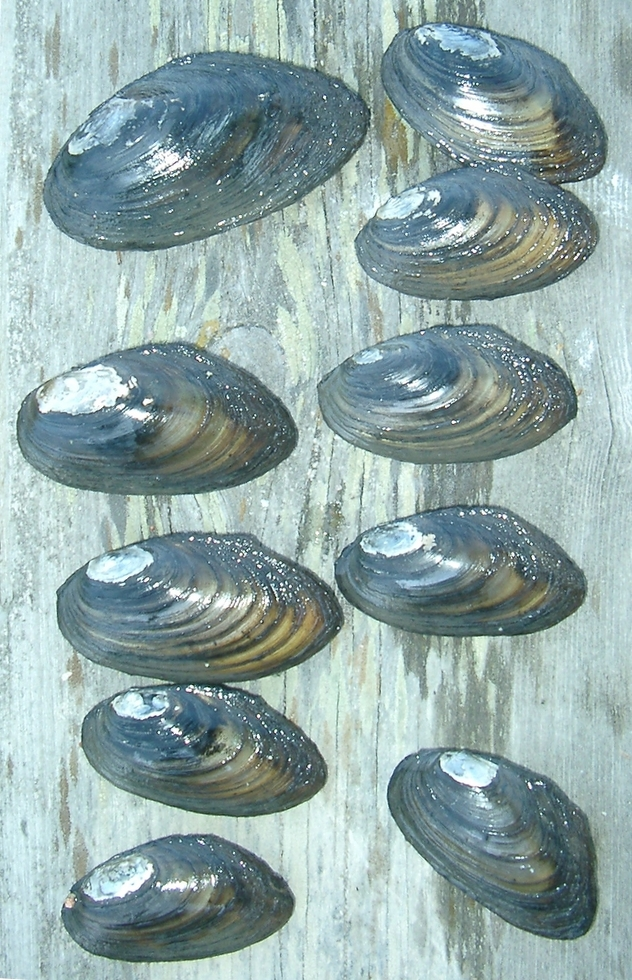
10 live individuals of the depressed river mussel

The depressed river mussel or compressed river mussel, Pseudanodonta complanata, is a species of freshwater mussel, an aquatic bivalve mollusk in the family Unionidae, the river mussels. The species name comes from the flattened shape of its shell.

This species is found throughout northern Europe, but it is endangered throughout its range.

While the survival of this species is thought to be threatened by pollution and the dredging of the slow-moving channels of water in which it lives, the species is also said to be "easily overlooked" (it can be confused with Anodonta anatina or juvenile Anodonta cygnea) and thus it may be actually be more prevalent than current records show.

== Distribution ==
Its native distribution is European. It has been recorded from:

- Czech Republic - in Bohemia, in Moravia, endangered (EN). It is endangered in Bohemia and critically endangered in Moravia.
- Estonia - present.
- Finland - not uncommon.
- Germany
  - critically endangered (vom Aussterben bedroht)
  - Listed as strictly protected species and as specially protected species in annex 1 in Bundesartenschutzverordnung.
- Netherlands - present
- Poland - endangered
- Slovakia - endangered
- United Kingdom - see Action plan for Pseudanodonta complanata, (British Isles - listed in List of endangered species in the British Isles)
- Sweden - rare
