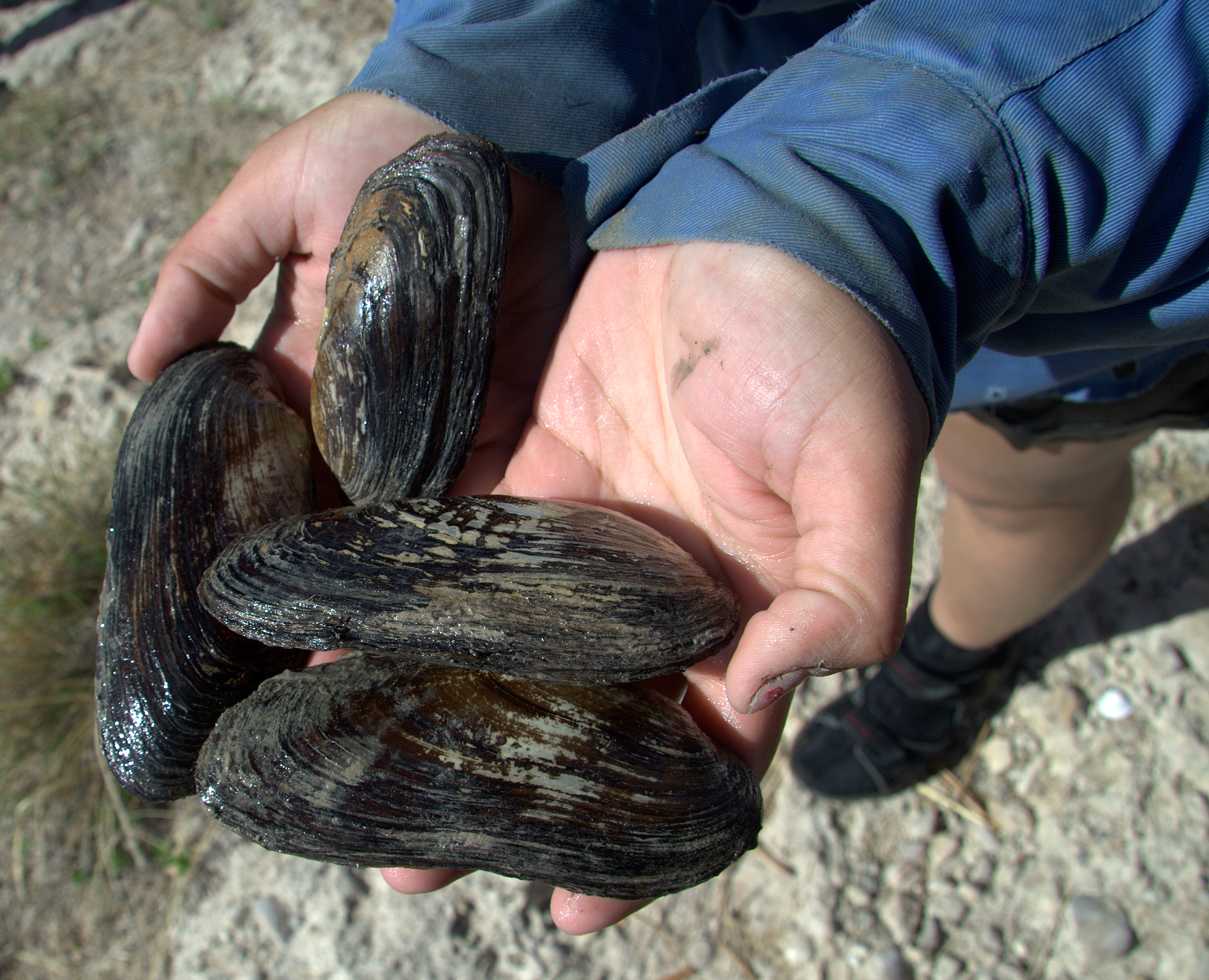
- Four live individuals of Popenaias popeii

Conservation status
- Critically Endangered (IUCN 2.3)

Scientific classification
- Kingdom: Animalia
- Phylum: Mollusca
- Class: Bivalvia
- Order: Unionida
- Family: Unionidae
- Genus: Popenaias
- Species: P. popeii

Binomial name
- Popenaias popeii (I. Lea, 1857)

Synonyms
- Popenaias popei (Lea, 1857); Popenais popeii (Lea, 1857); Unio popeii Lea, 1857

= Popenaias popeii =

Species of bivalve

Popenaias popeii, common name the Texas hornshell, is a species of freshwater mussel, an aquatic bivalve mollusk in the family Unionidae, the river mussels.

This species is found in Mexico, and in Texas and New Mexico in the United States.

== Diet and feeding ==
Following the parasitism of the glochidia larval stage, juvenile and adult Texas hornshells consume algae, detritus, and bacteria through filter feeding. They utilize their siphons to create a water current that pulls in possible food sources towards the gills, where food is then taken in and undesired particles are filtered out. P. popeii may also use deposit-feeding methods to obtain food, such as using their muscular foot to attain edible particles from the river floor.

== Parasitism and predation ==
There are currently no parasites known to specifically harm P. popeii, but they are parasitized by the organisms commonly known to feed off of Unionidae. These include parasites such as trematodes, water mites, protists and leeches. Furthermore, the nymph of Gomphus militaris, a species of dragonfly, was found to parasitize the gills of P. popeii, especially the brooding gills of females that house the glochidia larvae before release. Diversity is seen in predators of freshwater mussels like the Texas hornshell, ranging from turtles to raccoons to birds. Additionally, humans act as predators, using P. popeii for food or for making goods such as buttons.

== Habitat ==
Being part of the Unionidae, Texas hornshells are found in freshwater, specifically in rivers. To prevent from being carried downstream, P. popeii prefer habitats within the river where they can anchor to material like clay or sand. They are often found under large rocks and near areas where the current is least powerful. Furthermore, their habitats must be within a certain range of salinity, as too high of a salinity concentration can lead to detrimental outcomes including death. P. popeii inhabit areas where there are sufficient numbers of their host fish species for the glochidia larvae to attach to and parasitize. They tend to live in the portions of the river where there are the fewest barriers that would prevent glochidia from finding suitable fish hosts upon release from the female brooding gills.

== Life cycle ==
Texas hornshells do not experience direct development. They go through a developmental stage in which the larvae of P. popeii and the other freshwater mussels are referred to as glochidia. These glochidia are small, often measured in micrometers, and have rows of conical denticles on the inside of each valve. P. popeii glochidia are brooded in the gills of the female for about four to six weeks, classifying them as short-term brooders. Following release of the glochidia from the female, the larvae become obligate parasites of freshwater fishes and require a host within a few days. Laboratory studies have shown that the glochidia can parasitize a wide variety of fishes, but in nature they are primarily found to parasitize three species. These three species, C. carpio, M. congestum, and C. lutrensis, are parasitized by over 99% of P. popeii glochidia and serve as the primary dispersal method for the freshwater mussel. During the time attached to the fish host, the glochidia develop into juveniles. Upon maturation the adult P. popeii are typically immobile and long-lived.

== Distribution ==
Currently, Popenaias popeii is endemic to only a few stretches of rivers in North America. Individuals of the species can be found in the Black River in New Mexico and in portions of the Rio Grande, which extends through New Mexico, Texas, and Mexico. P. popeii scarcely populate the Black River, with living populations seen to only inhabit a 14-km stretch of the river. The Rio Grande contains a greater number of river segments with P. popeii, including Pecos River, Devil's River, and Las Moras Creek. P. popeii and various other freshwater mussels were previously more abundant in areas of the Rio Grande, with 15 species living in the river system in the late 1990s. Due to anthropogenic influence and other factors, the diversity of unionids has been reduced to approximately three species, including P. popeii. Additionally, the population size and area inhabited by P. popeii has drastically decreased, leaving only a 190-kilometre (120 mi) stretch of the Rio Grande that has a high abundance of P. popeii. A portion of the river in Laredo, Texas has the largest population of P. popeii with an estimated 8000+ Texas hornshells living there. The current fragmentation of P. popeii populations is expected to persist due to predicted habitat and climate changes.

== Conservation ==
P. popeii is currently listed as federally endangered under the Endangered Species Act of 1973, joining many other freshwater mussel species that are a conservation concern. The habitats of Texas hornshells, desert aquatic ecosystems, are highly susceptible to the major causes of biodiversity reduction seen globally. P. popeii are integral parts of the aquatic ecology where they are located, drawing support for their protection. Although the U.S. Fish and Wildlife Service's endangered classification of P. popeii is accompanied by federal protection, more research efforts are still being carried out to investigate key factors that may be useful in developing effective mitigation plans. The evolutionary differences among P. popeii populations caused by long-term fragmentation are being taken into account, meaning that conservation efforts in Black River and Rio Grande will be different and more individualized. Anthropogenic effects are also of major concern, including water and land usage that accompany the increasing human population. If not properly handled, it is predicted that distribution of P. popeii will not increase as potential habitats are altered or removed by human activity. Other ecological factors such as river management, salinity, and primary host fish management have similarly been found to influence persistence of P. popeii and thus serve as targets for mitigation.
