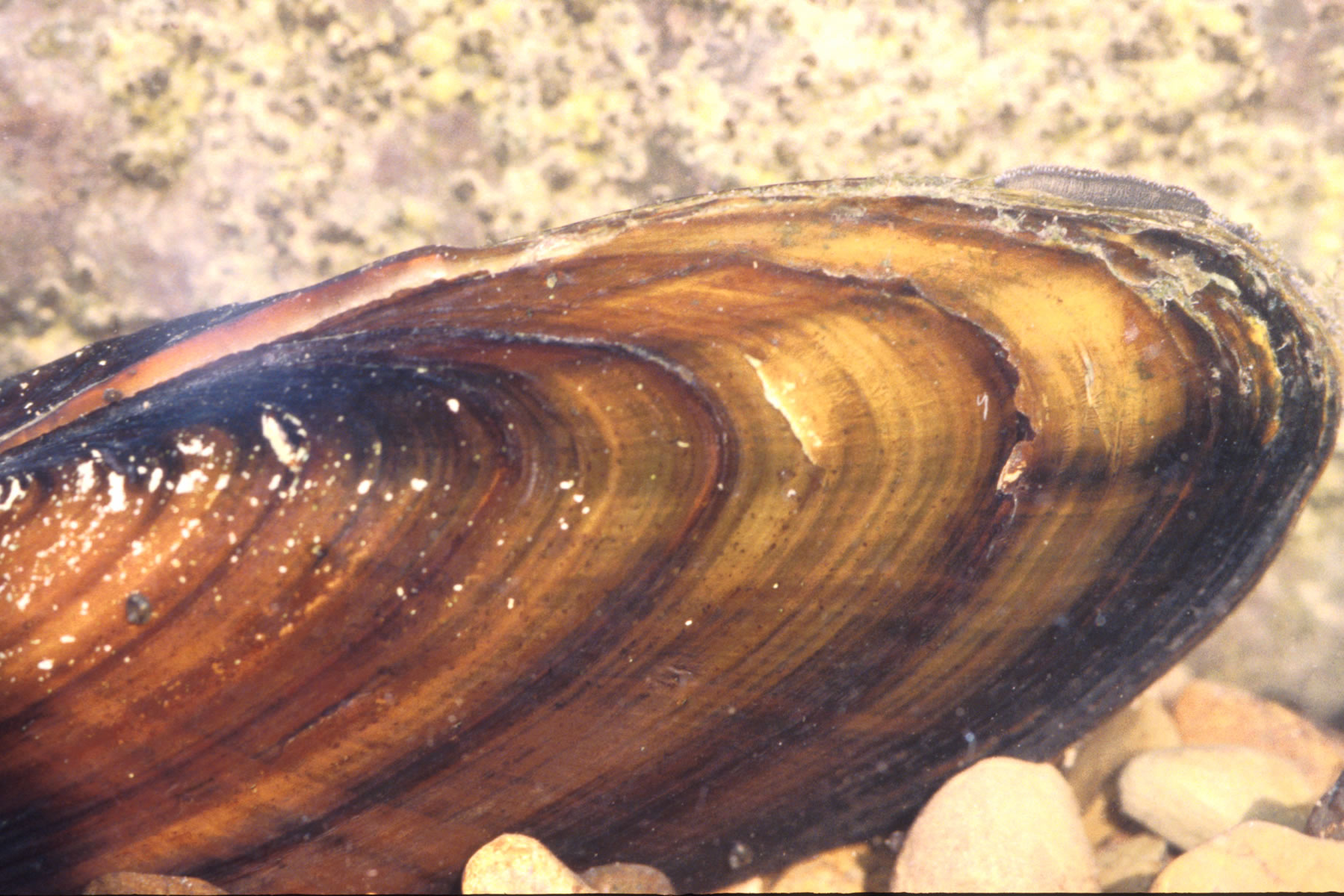

Conservation status
- Near Threatened (IUCN 3.1)

- Apparently Secure (NatureServe)

Scientific classification
- Kingdom: Animalia
- Phylum: Mollusca
- Class: Bivalvia
- Order: Unionida
- Family: Unionidae
- Genus: Ligumia
- Species: L. recta

Binomial name
- Ligumia recta Lamarck, 1819

Synonyms
- Lampsilis (Eurynia) recta (Lamarck, 1819); Lampsilis (Eurynia) recta sageri (Conrad, 1836); Lampsilis (Eurynia) rectus (Lamarck, 1819); Lampsilis (Ligumia) recta (Lamarck, 1819); Lampsilis (Ligumia) recta latissima (Rafinesque, 1820); Lampsilis recta (Lamarck, 1819); Lampsilis recta recta (Lamarck, 1819); Ligumia latissima (Rafinesque, 1820); Ligumia recta latissima (Rafinesque, 1820); Margarita (Unio) rectus (Lamarck, 1819); Margaron (Unio) rectus (Lamarck, 1819); Ptychobranchus fasciolare arquatum (Conrad, 1854); Unio (Eurynia) latissima Rafinesque, 1820; Unio angustatus cuniculus de Gregorio, 1914; Unio arquatus Conrad, 1854; Unio leprosus Miles, 1861; Unio praelongus Barnes, 1823; Unio recta Lamarck, 1819; Unio rectus (Lamarck, 1819); Unio sageri Conrad, 1836

= Ligumia recta =

Species of bivalve

Ligumia recta, or the black sandshell, is a species of freshwater mussel, an aquatic bivalve mollusk in the family Unionidae, the river mussels.

This species is found in eastern North America. It is native to the drainages of the Mississippi River, the drainages of the Great Lakes, and some Gulf Coast drainages.

The black sandshell can be up to 10 inches (25 cm) long, and is elongate and quadrate in shape. The shell is usually heavy, fairly thick, somewhat inflated and cylindrical.
