= Cyrtonaias =

Scientific classification
- Kingdom: Animalia
- Phylum: Mollusca
- Class: Bivalvia
- Order: Unionida
- Family: Unionidae
- Tribe: Lampsilini
- Genus: Cyrtonaias; Crosse & Fischer, 1894

Genus of bivalves

Cyrtonaias is a genus of freshwater mussels, aquatic bivalve mollusks in the family Unionidae.
