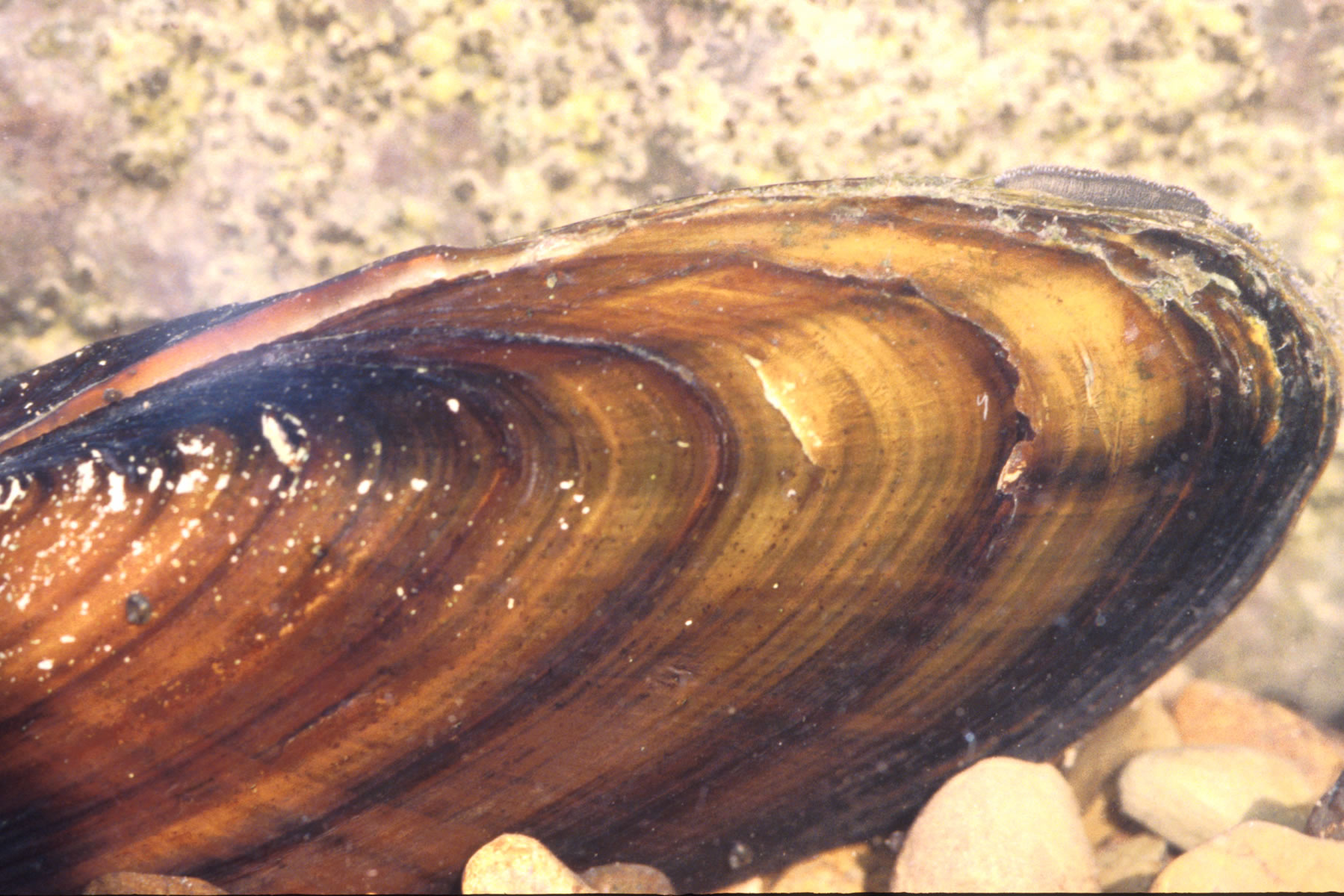
- Ligumia recta

Scientific classification
- Kingdom: Animalia
- Phylum: Mollusca
- Class: Bivalvia
- Order: Unionida
- Family: Unionidae
- Tribe: Lampsilini
- Genus: Ligumia; Swainson, 1840

Type species
- Unio recta Lamarck, 1819

Synonyms
- Lampsilis (Ligumia); Unio (Ligumia) Swainson, 1840 (original rank)

= Ligumia =

Genus of bivalves

Ligumia is a genus of freshwater mussels, aquatic bivalve mollusks in the family Unionidae.

== Species ==
Species within the genus Liguma include:

- Ligumia recta (Lamarck, 1819)

Species brought into synonymy

- Ligumia nasuta: synonym of Sagittunio nasutus (Say, 1817)
- Ligumia subrostrata (Say, 1831): synonym of Sagittunio subrostratus (Say, 1831)
