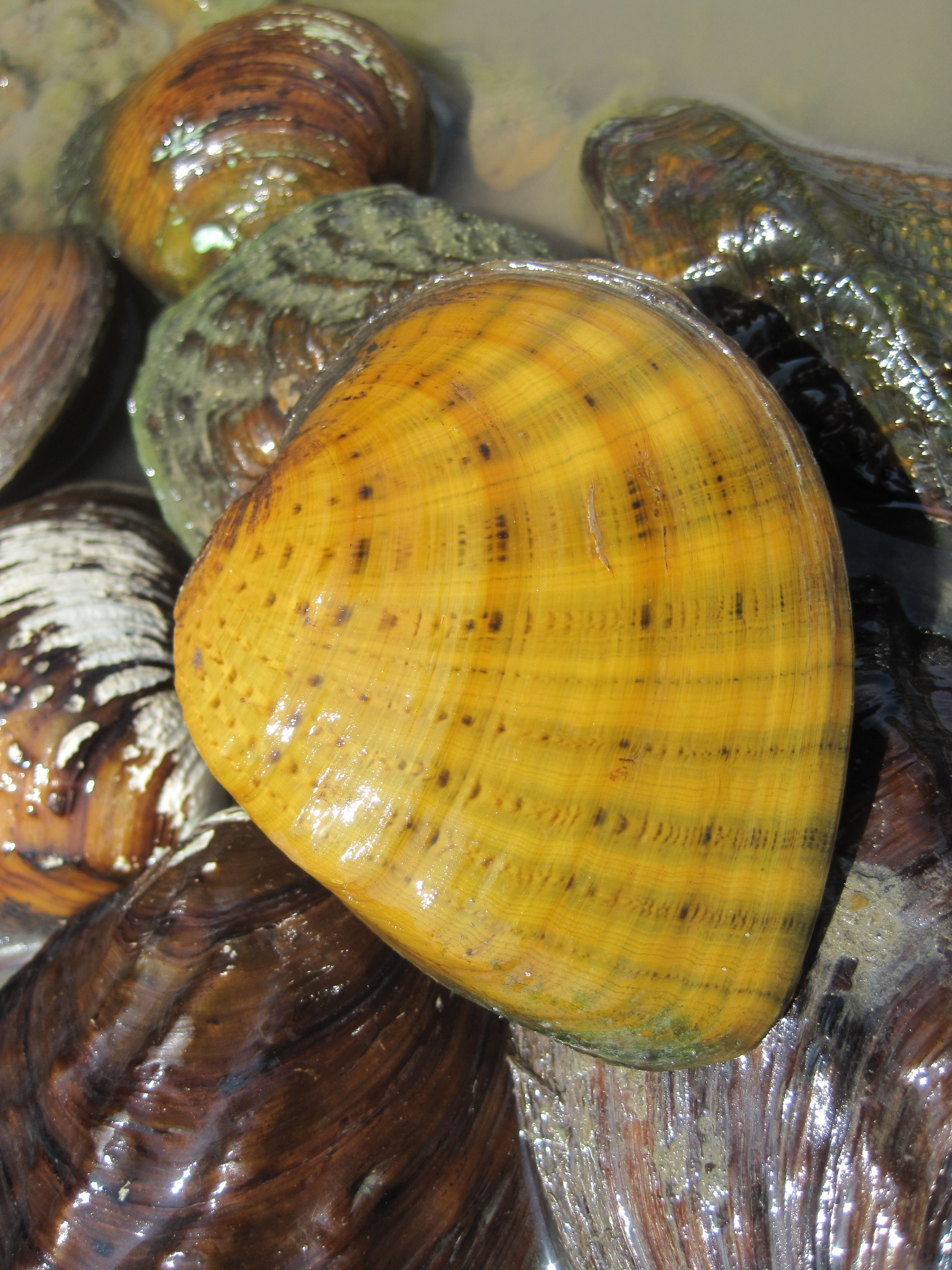
- A live individual of Ellipsaria lineolata

Conservation status
- Near Threatened (IUCN 2.3)

- Apparently Secure (NatureServe)

Scientific classification
- Kingdom: Animalia
- Phylum: Mollusca
- Class: Bivalvia
- Order: Unionida
- Family: Unionidae
- Tribe: Lampsilini
- Genus: Ellipsaria; Rafinesque, 1820
- Species: E. lineolata

Binomial name
- Ellipsaria lineolata Rafinesque, 1820

= Ellipsaria =

Species of bivalve

Ellipsaria lineolata is a species of freshwater mussel, an aquatic bivalve mollusk in the family Unionidae, the river mussels. This is the sole species in the monotypic genus Ellipsaria. This species is native to the drainage systems of the Mississippi River, the Mobile River, the Tennessee River, and the Cumberland River in the United States. It exists in the midwestern United States, and has also been observed in the east coast and as far south as the Gulf of Mexico. The common name of Ellipsaria lineolata is the Butterfly Mussel.

== Description ==
E. lineolata has a thick, fairly triangular shell with dorsal, anterior, and ventral margins that are rounded. The shells of males have a more compressed shape than that of females. Males' shells are also typically longer, growing up to 12.7 cm long compared to females, whose shells grow to around 7 cm long. The shells of most E. lineolata have a yellowish color on the outside, but some older mussels have a dark brown shell. The inside of the shell is white, and the hinge can sometimes be a dark green color. The sculpture of the beak contains double-looped, fine lines.

== Usage and conservation ==
As with several other freshwater mussel species, E. lineolata have been used to make pearl buttons. Today, E. lineolata and other mussels are sometimes used in the cultured pearl industry. This species is considered critically imperiled in some states like Louisiana and Kansas. E. lineolata lives buried in sand or gravel substrates in large rivers with fast currents. Additionally, this species has been found in reservoirs in the Tennessee River. This species is a long-term brooder and may be found gravid during any month of the year. Since the primary habitat of this species is the Mississippi River basin, the declining conditions of this habitat pose a threat to the existence of this species. The movement of fish hosts to this mussel are blocked by channelization, dams, and dredging that increase siltation in the river. The host fish for E. lineolata is Aplonditus grunniens, or the freshwater drum. E. lineolata have been increasingly affected by invasive species such as the zebra mussel, who attach to the outside of the butterfly mussel's shell in large numbers and cause suffocation.
