= Solenaia =

Scientific classification
- Kingdom: Animalia
- Phylum: Mollusca
- Class: Bivalvia
- Order: Unionida
- Family: Unionidae
- Genus: Solenaia; Conrad, 1869

Type species
- Mycetopus emarginatus Lea, 1860

Genus of bivalves

Solenaia is a genus of freshwater mussels in the family Unionidae. They have a very elongated shell that lacks dentition.

== Species ==
There is only one recognized extant species:

- Solenaia emarginata (Lea, 1860)

There is also one species only known from the fossil record:

- †Solenaia cordierii (C. H. d'Orbigny, 1837)

Many other species have been recognized before. Chinese literature sources have records of at least five different species. However, recent taxonomic work has moved most former Solenaia species to other genera, including Sinosolenaia, Parvasolenaia, and Koreosolenaia.

== Distribution ==
The only extant species, Solenaia emarginata (synonym: Solenaia khwaenoiensis) is found in Thailand in Chao Phraya and Mae Klong drainages.
