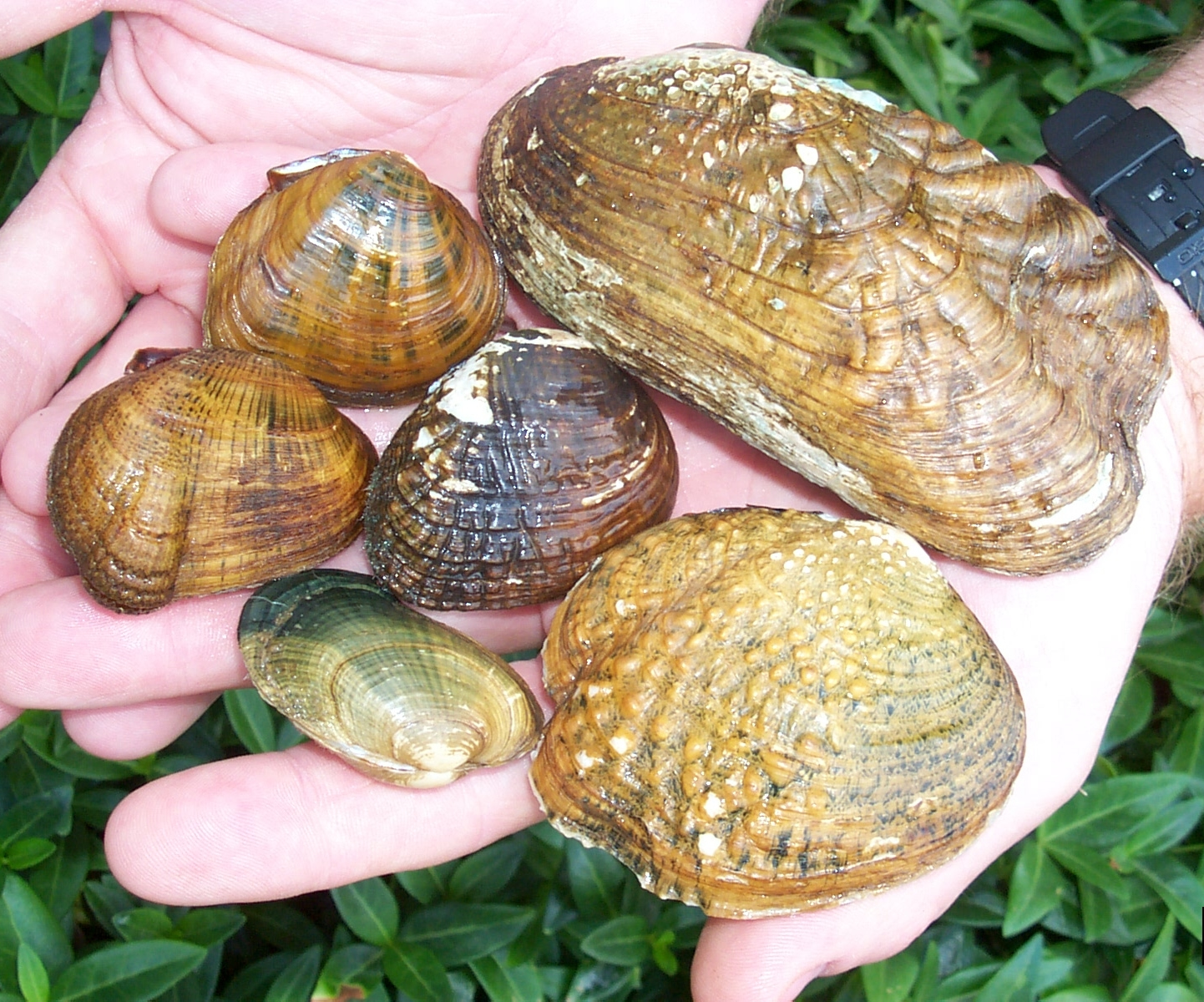
- Bottom diagonal row, left to right: Epioblasma brevidens, Epioblasma capsaeformis Middle row: Fusconaia cor, Lemiox rimosus, Quadrula intermedia Top row: Quadrula cylindrica

Scientific classification
- Kingdom: Animalia
- Phylum: Mollusca
- Class: Bivalvia
- Order: Unionida
- Family: Unionidae
- Subfamily: Ambleminae; Rafinesque, 1820

Genera
- See text

= Ambleminae =

Ambleminae Temporal range: Late Cretaceous–recent

Subfamily of freshwater mussel in the family Unionidae

Ambleminae is a subfamily of freshwater mussel in the family Unionidae. They are found throughout much of eastern North America south to Central America, although fossils are also known from Siberia. Some species have also been introduced to East Asia. They are the most speciose radiation of the Unionidae, with more than 300 species.

Fossils of this group date back to the Late Cretaceous.

== Systematics ==
The following classification is based on MolluscaBase and the MUSSEL Project database:

- Tribe Amblemini Rafinesque, 1820
  - Genus Amblema Rafinesque, 1820
  - Genus Plectomerus Conrad, 1853
  - Genus Reginaia D. C. Campbell & Lydeard, 2012
- Tribe Lampsilini Ihering, 1901
  - Genus Actinonaias Crosse & P. Fischer, 1894
  - Genus Arotonaias E. von Martens, 1900
  - Genus Atlanticoncha C. H. Smith, J. M. Pfeiffer & N. A. Johnson, 2020
  - Genus Cambarunio Watters, 2018
  - Genus Cyprogenia Agassiz, 1852
  - Genus Cyrtonaias Crosse & P. Fischer, 1894
  - Genus Delphinonaias Crosse & P. Fischer, 1894
  - Genus Disconaias Crosse & P. Fischer, 1894
  - Genus Dromus C. T. Simpson, 1900
  - Genus Ellipsaria Rafinesque, 1820
  - Genus Epioblasma Rafinesque, 1831
  - Genus Friersonia Ortmann, 1912
  - Genus Glebula Conrad, 1853
  - Genus Hamiota Roe & Hartfield, 2005
  - Genus Lampsilis Rafinesque, 1820
  - Genus Leaunio Watters, 2018
  - Genus Lemiox Rafinesque, 1831
  - Genus †Lenelliptio C. M. Kolesnikov, 1980 (Late Cretaceous of Siberia)
  - Genus Ligumia Swainson, 1840
  - Genus Medionidus C. T. Simpson, 1900
  - Genus Mesonaias Crosse & P. Fischer, 1894
  - Genus Obliquaria Rafinesque, 1820
  - Genus Obovaria Rafinesque, 1819
  - Genus Ortmanniana Frierson, 1927
  - Genus Pachynaias Crosse & P. Fischer, 1894
  - Genus Paetulunio Watters, 2018
  - Genus Potamilus Rafinesque, 1818
  - Genus Ptychobranchus C. T. Simpson, 1900
  - Genus Sagittunio Watters, 2018
  - Genus Toxolasma Rafinesque, 1831
  - Genus Truncilla Rafinesque, 1819
  - Genus Venustaconcha Frierson, 1927
  - Genus Villosa Frierson, 1927
- Tribe Pleurobemini Hannibal, 1912
  - Genus Elliptio Rafinesque, 1819
  - Genus Elliptoideus Frierson, 1927
  - Genus Eurynia Rafinesque, 1819
  - Genus Fusconaia C. T. Simpson, 1900
  - Genus Hemistena Rafinesque, 1820
  - Genus Parvaspina M. Perkins, N. A. Johnson & Gangloff, 2017
  - Genus Plethobasus C. T. Simpson, 1900
  - Genus Pleurobema Rafinesque, 1819
  - Genus Pleuronaia Frierson, 1927
- Tribe Popenaiadini Heard & Guckert, 1971
  - Genus Barynaias Crosse & P. Fischer, 1894
  - Genus Martensnaias Frierson, 1927
  - Genus Micronaias C. T. Simpson, 1900
  - Genus Nephritica Frierson, 1927
  - Genus Nephronaias Crosse & P. Fischer, 1894
  - Genus Popenaias Frierson, 1927
  - Genus Psoronaias Crosse & P. Fischer, 1894
  - Genus Psorula F. Haas, 1930
  - Genus Sphenonaias Crosse & P. Fischer, 1894
- Tribe Quadrulini Ihering, 1901
  - Genus Cyclonaias Pilsbry, 1922
  - Genus †Eonaias W. B. Marshall, 1929 (Pliocene of Texas)
  - Genus Megalonaias Utterback, 1915
  - Genus †Proparreysia Pilsbry, 1921 (Late Cretaceous of Colorado)
  - Genus †Protamblema Modell, 1957 (Late Cretaceous of Wyoming)
  - Genus Pustulosa Frierson, 1927
  - Genus Quadrula Rafinesque, 1820
  - Genus Theliderma Swainson, 1840
  - Genus Uniomerus Conrad, 1853
