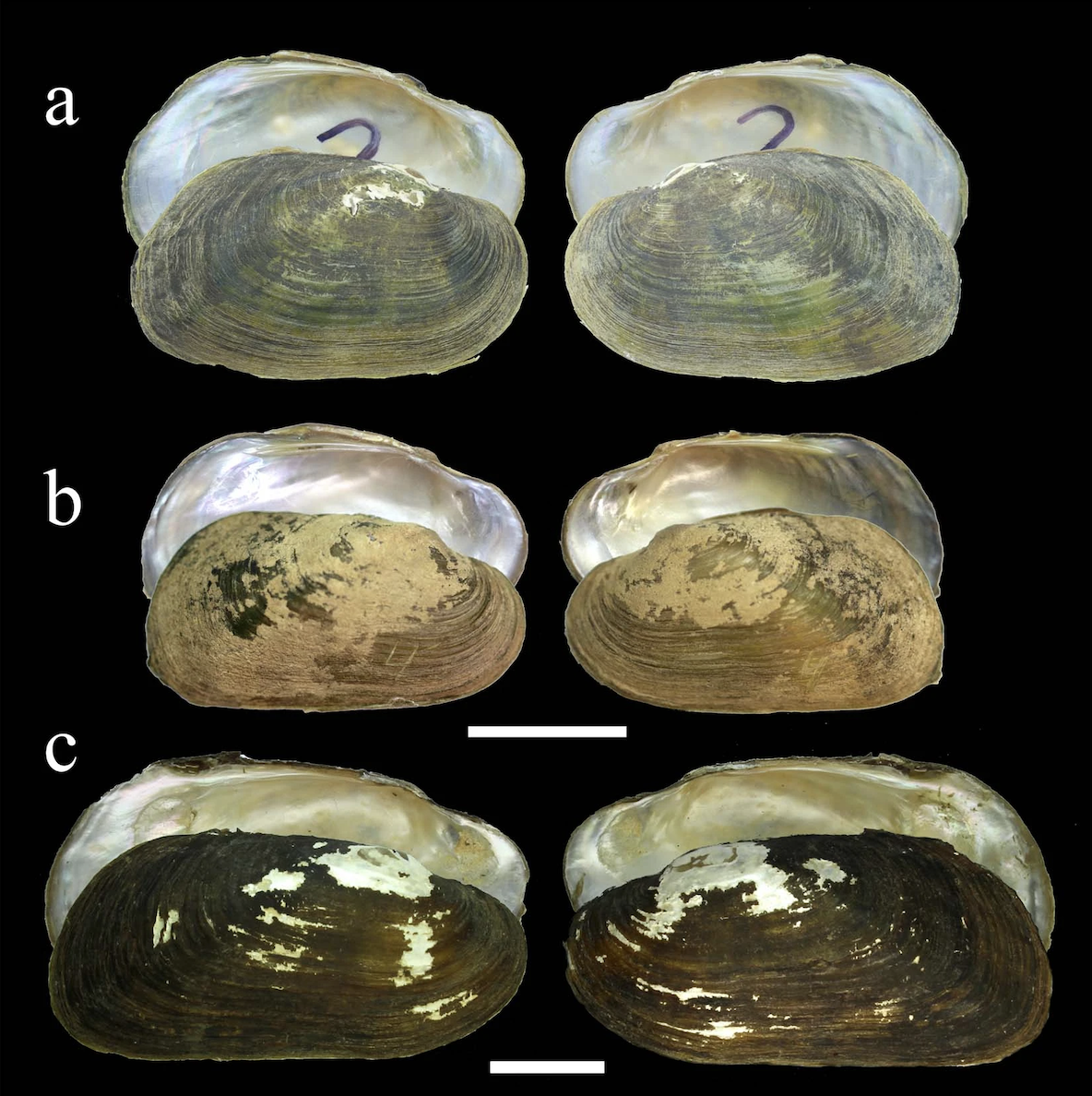
- Shell morphology of Yaukthwa species in Myanmar, photograph taken by Ekaterina S. Konoplev

Scientific classification
- Kingdom: Animalia
- Phylum: Mollusca
- Class: Bivalvia
- Order: Unionida
- Family: Unionidae
- Subfamily: Rectidentinae
- Tribe: Contradentini
- Genus: Yaukthwa; Konopleva et al., 2019

= Yaukthwa =

Genus of mussels

Yaukthwa is a genus of freshwater mussels in the family Unionidae, subfamily Rectidentinae, tribe Contradentini. The genus is endemic to the Western Indochina Subregion, with species distributed across the Ayeyarwady, Sittaung, Bago, and Salween river drainages in Myanmar and northwestern Thailand.

The genus name derives from the Burmese word yaukthwa, meaning "freshwater bivalve".

== Taxonomy ==
Yaukthwa was described by Konopleva et al. in 2019 following an integrative revision of the genus Trapezoideus Simpson, 1900. Molecular phylogenetic analyses based on mitochondrial (COI, 16S rRNA) and nuclear (28S rRNA) gene fragments demonstrated that Trapezoideus as previously circumscribed was non-monophyletic. Several of its western Indochina species formed a well-supported distinct clade, which was described as Yaukthwa gen. nov., with Yaukthwa nesemanni designated as the type species.

Yaukthwa is placed within the tribe Contradentini of the subfamily Rectidentinae, and is phylogenetically distant from related genera such as Trapezoideus, Physunio, and Contradens, which are distributed east of the Salween–Mekong drainage divide.

The genus has had the following synonymised or transferred names:

Former name	Authority	Notes
Trapezoideus nesemanni	Konopleva, Vikhrev & Bolotov, 2017	Transferred to Yaukthwa as type species
Trapezoideus panhai	Konopleva, Bolotov & Kondakov, 2017	Transferred to Yaukthwa
Trapezoideus dallianus	Frierson, 1913	Transferred to Yaukthwa
Trapezoideus zayleymanensis	Preston, 1912	Transferred to Yaukthwa
Trapezoideus peguensis	Anthony, 1865	Transferred to Yaukthwa
Indonaia rectangularis	Tapparone-Canefri, 1889	Transferred to Yaukthwa
Balwantia baniensis	Bolotov et al., 2020	Transferred to Yaukthwa

The recognised species (including all transferred species and newly found species) are:

1. Yaukthwa nesemanni (Konopleva, Vikhrev & Bolotov, 2017)
2. Yaukthwa panhai (Konopleva, Bolotov & Kondakov, 2017)
3. Yaukthwa dallianus (Frierson, 1913)
4. Yaukthwa zayleymanensis (Preston, 1912)
5. Yaukthwa peguensis (Anthony, 1865)
6. Yaukthwa paiensis (Konopleva et al., 2019)
7. Yaukthwa inlenensis (Konopleva et al., 2019)
8. Yaukthwa elongatula (Konopleva et al., 2019)
9. Yaukthwa avaensis (Bolotov et al., 2020)
10. Yaukthwa rectangularis (Tapparone-Canefri, 1889)
11. Yaukthwa baniensis (Bolotov et al., 2020)

== Distribution ==
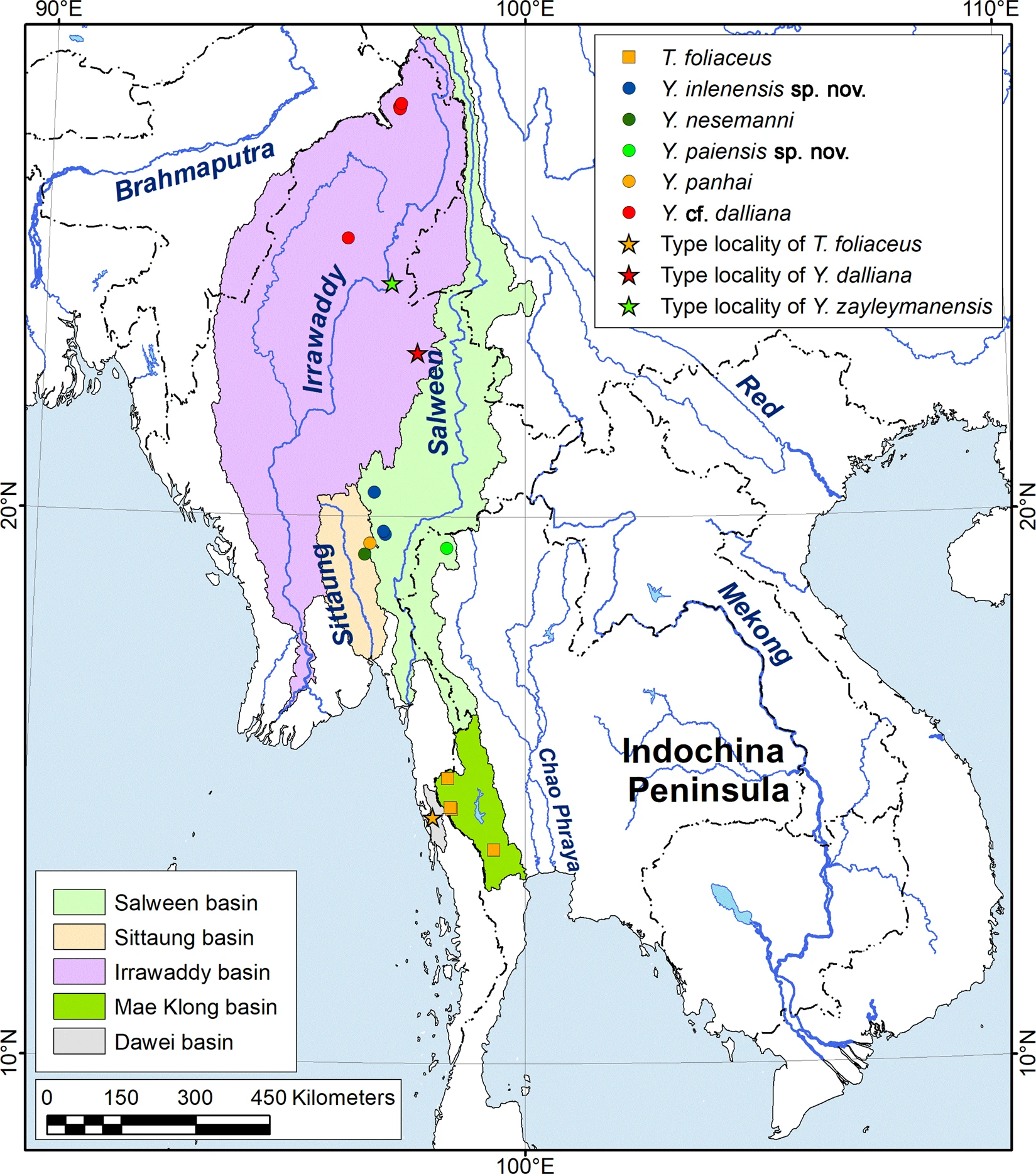
Distribution ranges of Trapezoideus foliaceus and species in the genus Yaukthwa

Yaukthwa is endemic to the Western Indochina Subregion. Species have been recorded from the Ayeyarwady, Sittaung, Bago, and Salween river drainages in Myanmar, and from the Salween Basin in northwestern Thailand. The two species described as new to science in the founding revision, Yaukthwa paiensis and Y. inlenensis, are both endemic to the Salween River basin, with Y. paiensis known from the Khong River in northwestern Thailand and Y. inlenensis from the Mway Stream tributary in Myanmar.

As part of the broader Western Indochina Subregion, the drainages inhabited by Yaukthwa, particularly the Ayeyarwady, Bago, Sittaung, and Salween, form a distinct freshwater biogeographic unit separated from the Indian Subregion to the west by the Naga Hills, Chin Hills, and Rakhine Yoma mountain ranges, and from the Sundaland Subregion to the south by the Isthmus of Kra. The genus belongs to an endemic clade of Western Indochina, where it constitutes part of a larger radiation of freshwater bivalves characterised by high levels of species-level endemism.

Many species are known only from their type localities, reflecting the limited extent of freshwater mussel sampling in the region and suggesting that further survey work may reveal additional populations or taxa.

== Morphology ==
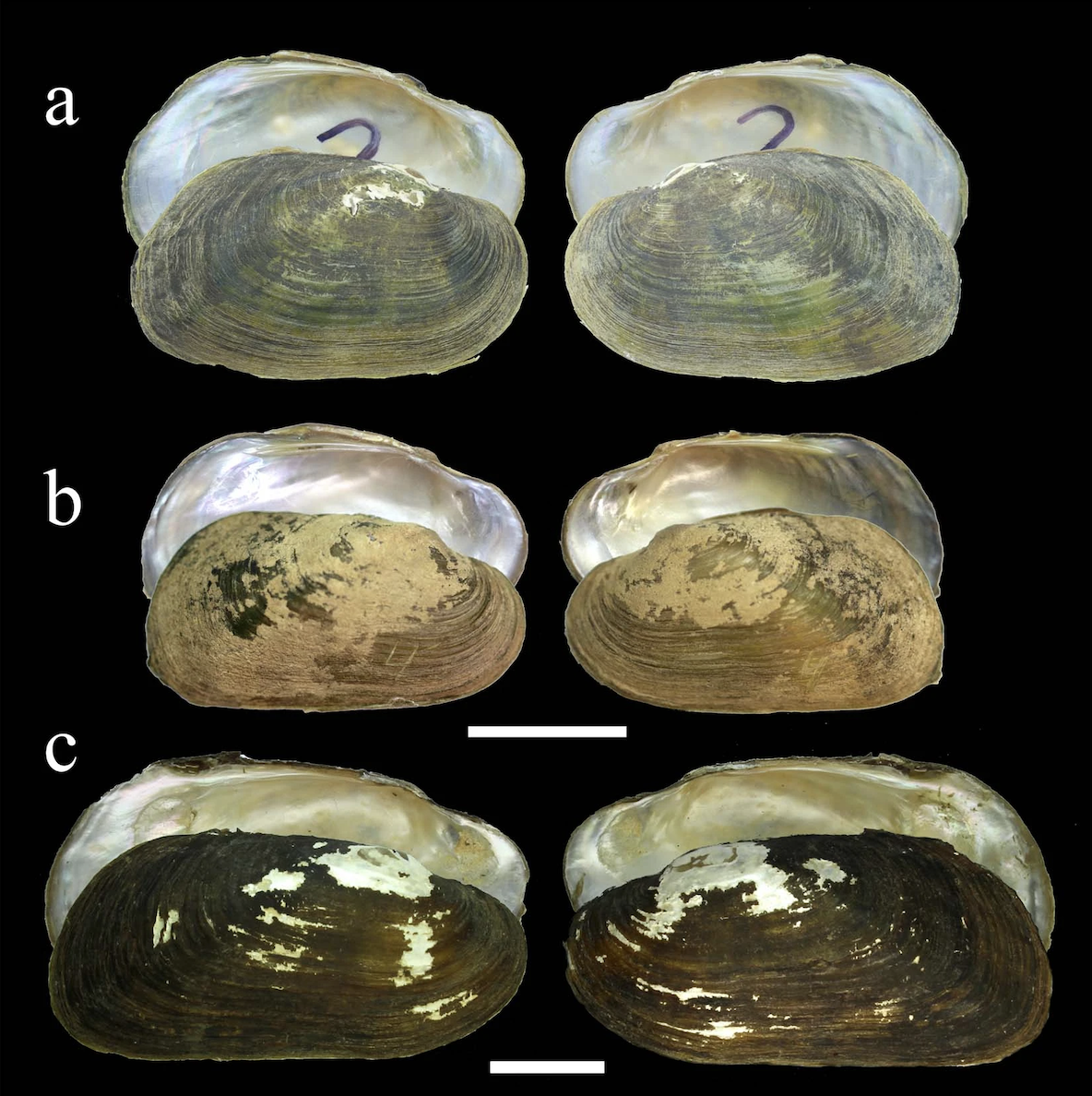
Shell of (a) Yaukthwa" cf. "dalliana, Nanuinhka Chaung River, Ayeyarwady Basin, Myanmar. (b) "Yaukthwa panhai", Kyan Hone River, Sittaung Basin, Myanmar. (c) "Yaukthwa nesemanni", Thauk Ye Kupt River, Sittaung Basin, Myanmar

Members of Yaukthwa have a medium-sized shell, transitioning from obovate in juvenile specimens to trapezoidal in adult individuals. The shell is inequilateral and rather compressed, and varies in thickness across specimens. While the genus is morphologically similar to Contradens and Trapezoideus, adult Yaukthwa can be reliably distinguished by a wider and more rounded anterior end, a straighter dorsal margin that lacks a developed wing, and a shallow posterior muscle scar. The right valve bears one lateral tooth and two linear pseudocardinal teeth, and the left valve has two curved lateral teeth and one pseudocardinal tooth. In some specimens, the teeth may be reduced, typically to a single weak tubercle-like lateral tooth and one pseudocardinal tooth per valve.

The anterior adductor muscle scar is well-developed and oval in shape. The posterior muscle scar is shallow. This is a feature that, combined with the shell outline and dental formula, forms the basis of the genus-level diagnosis. Principal component analysis of shell shape across the genus has demonstrated that the shell outlines of most Yaukthwa species broadly overlap, with the notable exception of Y. inlenensis, whose specimens form a largely distinct morphological cluster, likely reflecting its adaptation to a lacustrine environment.

== Behaviour and habitat ==
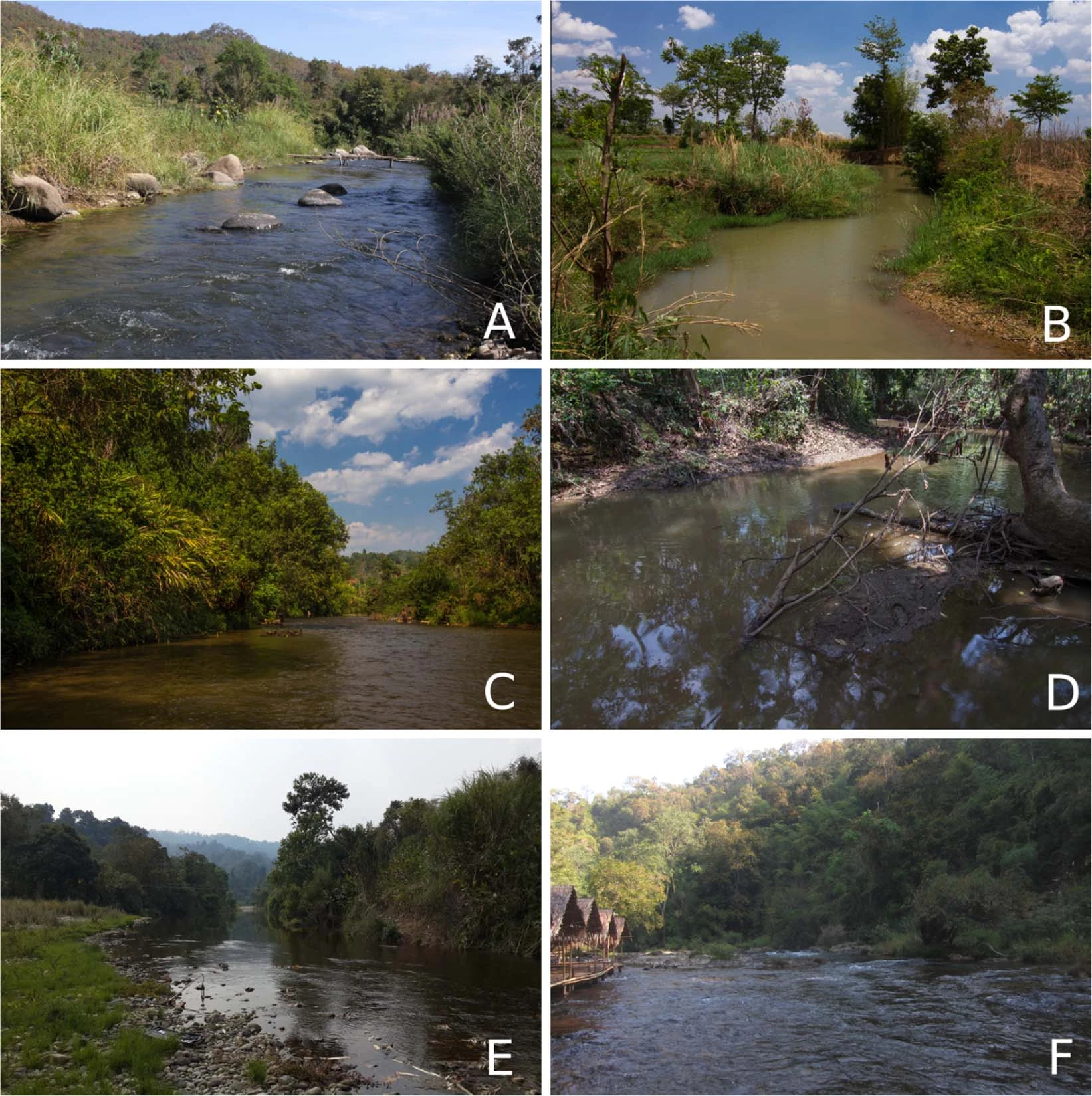
Type localities and habitats of the Yaukthwa species and habitat of Trapezoideus foliaceus

Species of Yaukthwa are predominantly found in rapidly flowing mountain streams and rivers with sandy, gravel, or clay substrates, mostly within upland portions of their respective drainages. Type localities documented in the founding revision include swift rivers in the Sittaung and Ayeyarwady basins, such as the Thauk Ye Kupt River and the Nam Shu River, consistent with a preference for lotic, high-gradient environments.

An exception to this generalisation is Yaukthwa inlenensis, which inhabits rivers and streams with moderate current and clay substrate, including tributaries and the outlet of Inle Lake in the Salween Basin. This species represents an intra-drainage endemic with a habitat preference distinct from the broader genus. Similarly, Yaukthwa elongatula, described from the Chindwin Basin, represents a further example of intra-drainage endemism within the genus.

Like other freshwater mussels, Yaukthwa species are sensitive indicators of water quality and habitat condition. Freshwater mussels more broadly have been noted to exhibit the fastest rates of human-mediated global extinction among aquatic animals, a vulnerability rooted in their reliance on stable, high-quality lotic habitats and their complex life cycles, which typically involve parasitic larvae (glochidia) on host fish.

== Conservation ==
All Yaukthwa species have restricted distribution ranges, with several known only from single localities, making the entire genus vulnerable to localised disturbance. The founding authors of the genus highlighted the need for dedicated conservation efforts by governments, local authorities, and international organisations in Myanmar and Thailand.

Primary threats to Yaukthwa include dam construction, water pollution, and deforestation, which degrade the lotic freshwater habitats on which these mussels depend. The broader context of rapid economic development and agricultural expansion in Myanmar has been identified as a driver of accelerating freshwater habitat degradation across the region, rendering a national conservation action plan for freshwater bivalves urgently necessary. Bolotov et al. (2019) noted that current knowledge of freshwater mussels in Myanmar remains incomplete, with many lineages still awaiting description, and further taxonomic research is required before a comprehensive conservation strategy can be developed.

The biogeographic research that underlies the circumscription of Yaukthwa has also highlighted Western Indochina more broadly as a freshwater biodiversity hotspot of worldwide significance, harbouring numerous narrowly endemic species across multiple aquatic invertebrate groups. The authors of successive revisionary studies have consistently underscored that the freshwater bivalve fauna of Southeast Asia is species-rich but poorly known, and that many local endemic lineages may already be on the brink of extinction due to the combined pressures of anthropogenic change and climate change impacts.
