= Disconaias =

Scientific classification
- Domain: Eukaryota
- Kingdom: Animalia
- Phylum: Mollusca
- Class: Bivalvia
- Order: Unionida
- Family: Unionidae
- Subfamily: Ambleminae
- Tribe: Lampsilini
- Genus: Disconaias; Crosse & Fischer, 1894

Genus of bivalves

Disconaias is a genus of freshwater mussels, aquatic bivalve mollusks in the family Unionidae, the river mussels.

== Species within the genus Disconaias ==
- Disconaias disca
