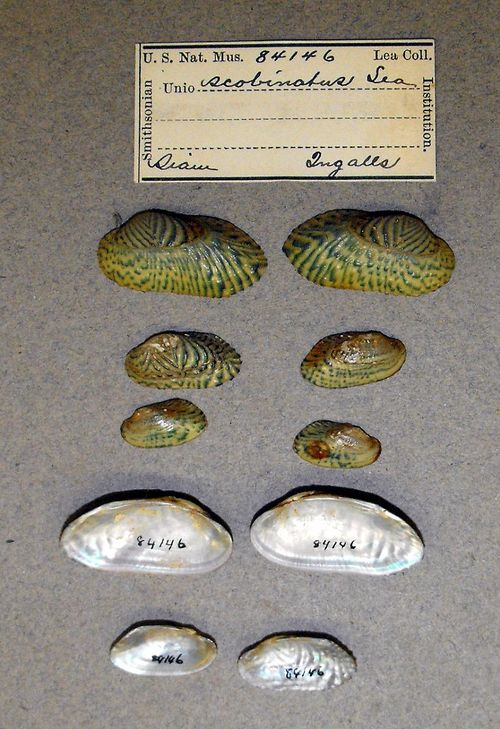
- Scabies scobinatus

Scientific classification
- Kingdom: Animalia
- Phylum: Mollusca
- Class: Bivalvia
- Order: Unionida
- Family: Unionidae
- Subfamily: Parreysiinae
- Tribe: Indochinellini
- Genus: Scabies; F.Haas, 1911

Type species
- Scabies scobinatus I.Lea, 1856

Species
- Scabies anceps Deshayes, 1876; Scabies crispata A.Gould, 1843; Scabies humilis I.Lea, 1856; Scabies mandarinus Morelet, 1864; Scabies nucleus I.Lea, 1856; Scabies phaselus I.Lea, 1856; Scabies pilata I.Lea, 1866; Scabies scobinatus I.Lea, 1856

= Scabies (bivalve) =

Genus of molluscs

Scabies is a genus of freshwater mussels found in the Indochina region. They belong to the family Unionidae, the river mussels. Members of this genus can be identified by brown zigzag patterns arranged in V- or W-shaped configurations that form grooves in their shells.

== Taxonomy ==
The genus was initially introduced as a subgenus of the genus Nodularia Conrad, 1853, and later raised to the generic level by Haas (1969).

In 2019, a study of the molecular phylogeny of the known Scabies species and two species of the Radiatula genus resulted in the transfer of R. humilis (Lea, 1856) and R. pilata (Lea, 1866) to the Scabies genus as S. humilis and S. pilata. This study also demonstrated a sufficiently large phylogenetic difference between S. songkramensis (Kongim & Panha, 2015) and the other species of the Scabies genus, so a subsequent study in 2020 placed it in its own monotypic genus Scabiellus.

In 2024, S. longata and S. chinensis were identified as junior synonyms of existing species Nodularia douglasiae and N. nuxpersicae respectively.

== Description ==
The shell of the members of this genus is relatively solid, though not especially thick, and varies in shape from elongate-oval to wedge-shaped (cuneiform) or kidney-shaped (reniform). The outer surface (periostracum) is typically yellowish to olive-green in colour and is marked with brown zigzag patterns arranged in V- or W-shaped configurations.

The hinge structure is characterised by lamelliform lateral teeth. Both valves possess two lateral teeth, as the right valve includes an additional (auxiliary) lateral tooth positioned beneath the primary one. The pseudocardinal teeth differ between valves: in the right valve, they comprise a short, low lamella situated close to the hinge margin and a prominent, deeply incised triangular tooth; in the left valve, they consist of a sharp, elevated but short lamella and a lower, deeply incised, tubercle-like tooth.

== Distribution ==
This genus is found in mainland Southeast Asia, distributed across freshwater systems in the Indochina regions. The majority of species in this genus is endemic to the Chao Phraya and Mekong River, as well as other rivers that drain into the Gulf of Thailand. S. crispata, however, is recorded from the Tavoy River, Myanmar.

Previously thought to occur in China, a 2024 study has properly clarified that the Scabies genus does not occur in China, with the two species formerly known as S. longata and S. chinesis, both endemic to China, being identified as members of another genus Nodularia.
