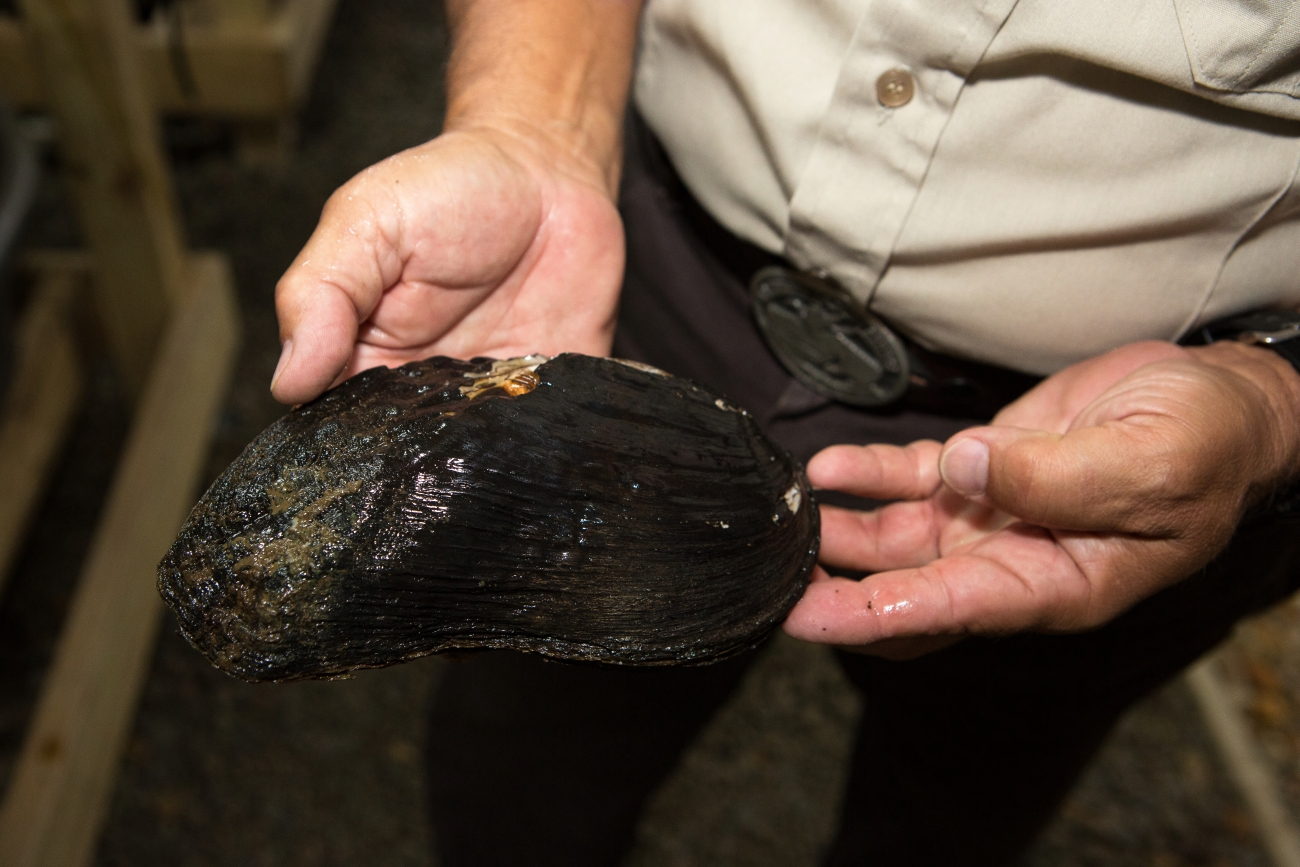

Conservation status
- Vulnerable (IUCN 3.1)

- Imperiled (NatureServe)

Scientific classification
- Kingdom: Animalia
- Phylum: Mollusca
- Class: Bivalvia
- Order: Unionida
- Family: Unionidae
- Tribe: Pleurobemini
- Genus: Elliptoideus; Frierson, 1927
- Species: E. sloatianus

Binomial name
- Elliptoideus sloatianus (I. Lea, 1840)

Synonyms
- Nephronaias sloatianus I. Lea, 1840

= Purple bankclimber =

Species of bivalve

The purple bankclimber (Elliptoideus sloatianus) is a rare and endangered species of freshwater mussel, an aquatic bivalve mollusk in the family Unionidae, the river mussels.

This species is endemic to the states of Georgia and Florida in the United States. It can be found in the Chattahoochee, Flint, and Ochlockonee rivers. Its habitats are rivers and streams. It is normally found in medium currents over sand, sand mixed with mud, or gravel substrates, swept free of silt by the current.

The threats to this mussel are habitat change, sedimentation, and water quality degradation. It is listed as threatened under the Endangered Species Act.
