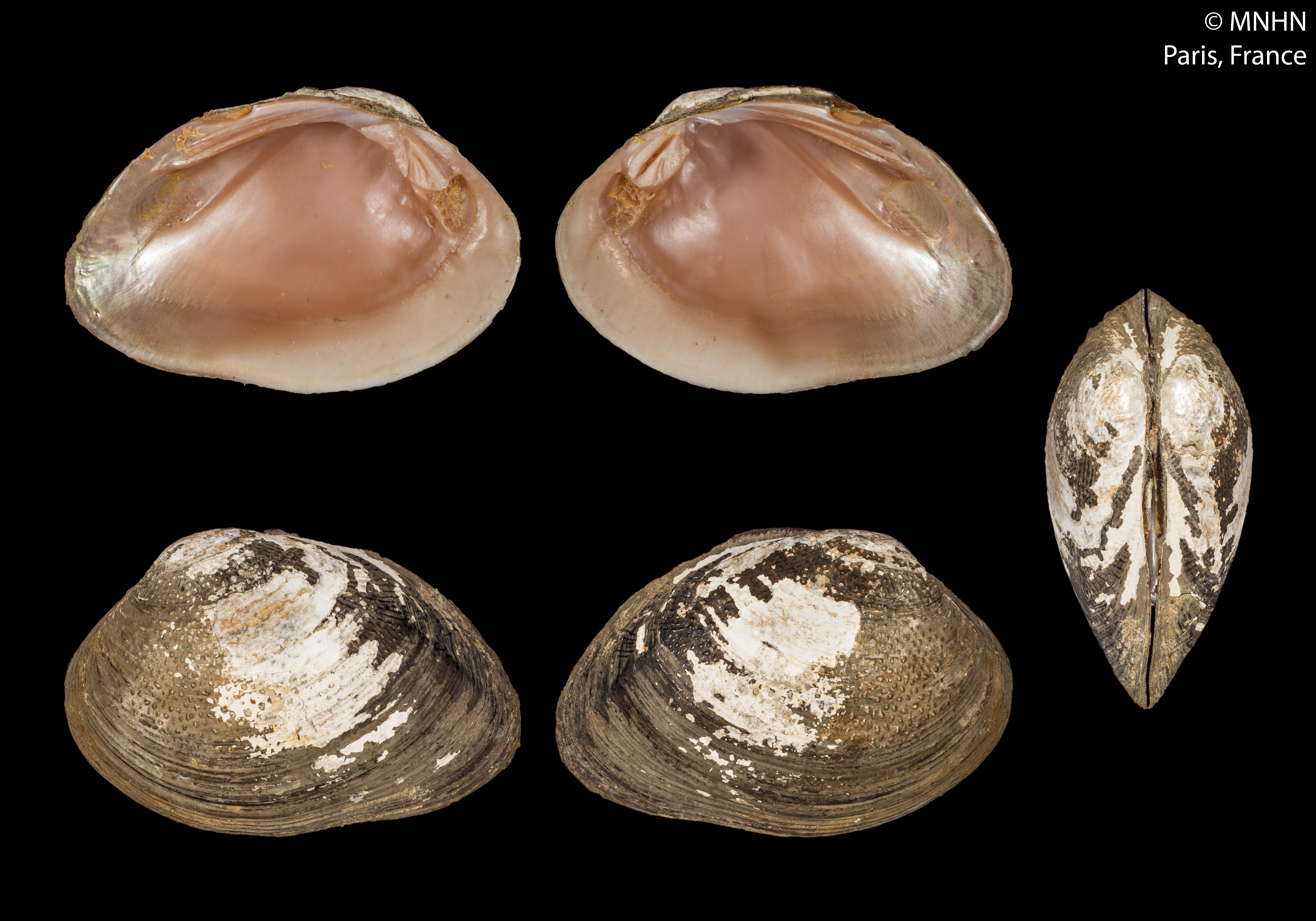
- Shell of Psoronaias semigranosa (paralectotype at MNHN, Paris)

Scientific classification
- Domain: Eukaryota
- Kingdom: Animalia
- Phylum: Mollusca
- Class: Bivalvia
- Order: Unionida
- Family: Unionidae
- Subfamily: Ambleminae
- Tribe: Popenaiadini
- Genus: Psoronaias; Crosse & P. Fischer, 1894

Type species
- Unio psoricus Morelet, 1851

Synonyms
- Unio (Psoronaias) Crosse & P. Fischer, 1894

= Psoronaias =

Genus of bivalves

Psoronaias is a genus of freshwater mussels, aquatic bivalve mollusks in the subfamily Ambleminae of the family Unionidae, the river mussels.

== Species ==
- Psoronaias crocodilorum (P.M.A. Morelet, 1849) (synonym: Unio crocodillorum P.M.A. Morelet, 1849)
- Psoronaias distincta (Crosse & P. Fischer, 1893)
- Psoronaias guatemalensis (Simpson, 1900)
- Psoronaias herrerae (Marshall, 1923)
- Psoronaias kuxensis Frierson, 1917
- Psoronaias martensi Frierson, 1927
- Psoronaias ostreata (Morelet, 1849)
- Psoronaias percompressa (E. von Martens, 1887)
- Psoronaias profunda (Simpson, 1914)
- Psoronaias quadrata (Simpson, 1914)
- Psoronaias salinarum (Haas, 1929)
- Psoronaias semigranosa (Philippi, 1843)
- Psoronaias usumasintae (Crosse & P. Fischer, 1893)

Synonyms

- Psoronaias crocodilorum (P.M.A. Morelet, 1849): synonym of Psoronaias semigranosa (Philippi, 1843)
