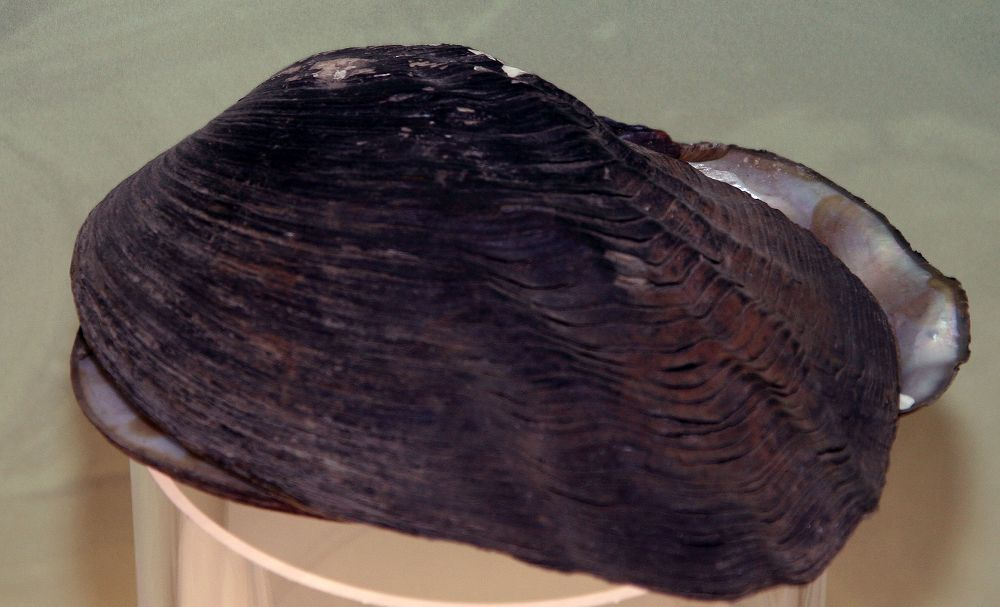
- Megalonaias nervosa

Scientific classification
- Domain: Eukaryota
- Kingdom: Animalia
- Phylum: Mollusca
- Class: Bivalvia
- Order: Unionida
- Family: Unionidae
- Tribe: Quadrulini
- Genus: Megalonaias; Utterback, 1915

= Megalonaias =

Genus of bivalves

Megalonaias is a genus of bivalves belonging to the family Unionidae.

The species of this genus are found in North America and Central America.

== Species ==
Species:

- Megalonaias nervosa (Rafinesque, 1820)
- Megalonaias nickliniana (Lea, 1834)
