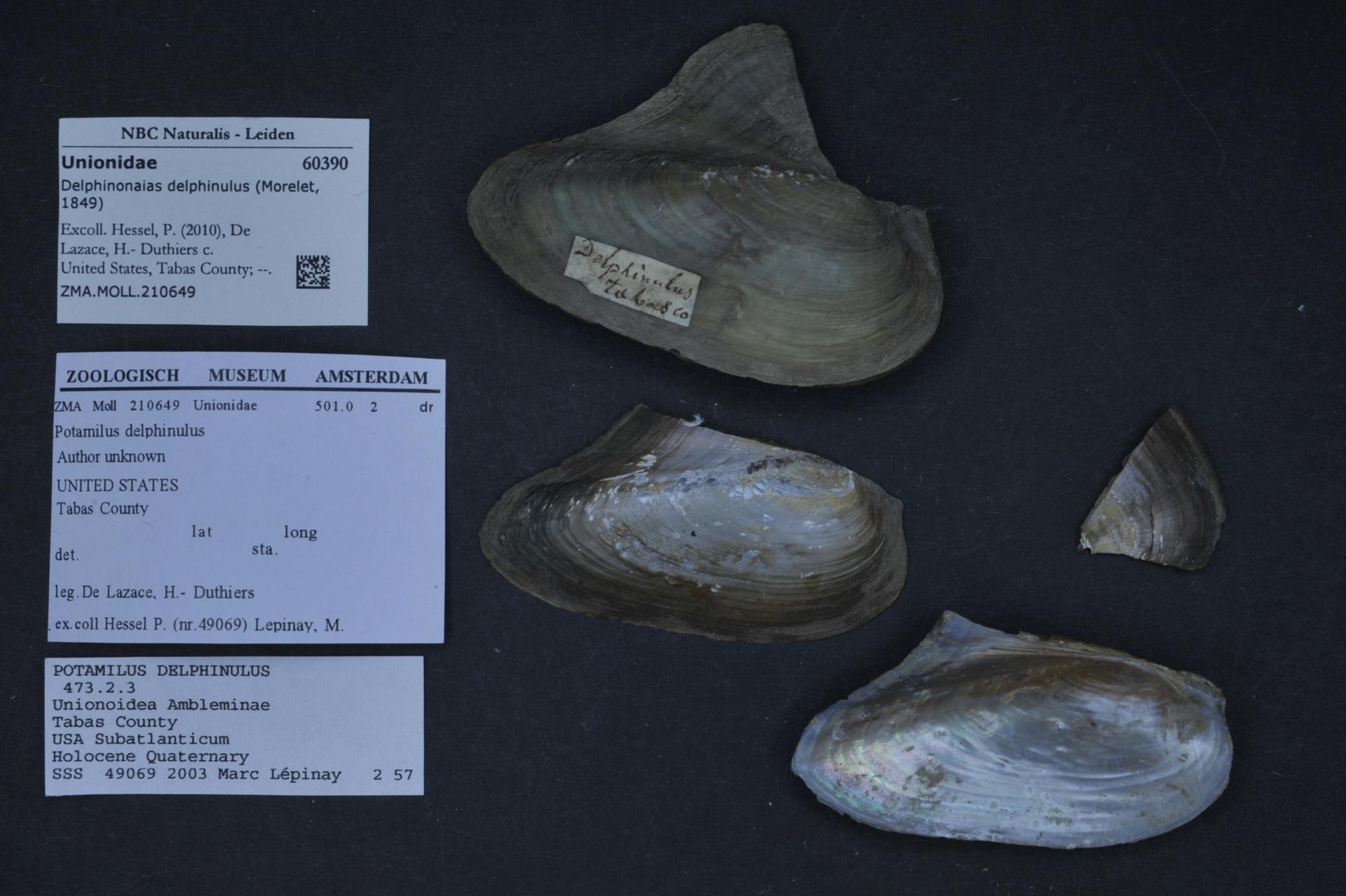
- A collection of D. delphinulus shells

Scientific classification
- Domain: Eukaryota
- Kingdom: Animalia
- Phylum: Mollusca
- Class: Bivalvia
- Order: Unionida
- Family: Unionidae
- Tribe: Lampsilini
- Genus: Delphinonaias; Crosse & Fischer, 1894

Synonyms
- Unio (Delphinonaias) Crosse & P. Fischer, 1894 (original rank)

= Delphinonaias =

Genus of bivalves

Delphinonaias is a genus of freshwater mussels, aquatic bivalve mollusks in the subfamily Ambleminae of the family Unionidae.

== Distribution ==
Species in this freshwater genus are found in Guatemala.

== Species ==
Species within the genus Cyrtonaias include:

- Delphinonaias largillierti (Philippi, 1847)
- Delphinonaias scutulata (Morelet, 1849)

Species brought into synonymy

- Delphinonaias delphinula (Morelet, 1849): synonym of Delphinonaias largillierti (Philippi, 1847) (a junior synonym)
