= Ligodonta =

Conservation status
- Critically Imperiled (NatureServe)

Scientific classification
- Kingdom: Animalia
- Phylum: Mollusca
- Class: Bivalvia
- Order: Unionida
- Family: Unionidae
- Genus: Ligodonta; M. Perkins, DeVilbiss & Whelan, 2025
- Species: L. obscura

Binomial name
- Ligodonta obscura M. Perkins, DeVilbiss & Whelan, 2025

Species of bivalve

Ligodonta obscura, the solstice creekmussel, is a species of freshwater mussel in the family Unionidae. It is the only member of the genus Ligodonta. The species is only known to live in Randolph County, North Carolina in the Little River.

== Etymology ==
The genus name Ligodonta comes from the Greek ligo-, meaning little, and -donta, meaning tooth. The species name obscura comes from the English word obscure in reference to its ability to evade discovery until 2025. The common name solstice creekmussel is named after its reproductive period centered around the winter solstice.

== Discovery ==
The mussel was first found during a routine mussel survey on the Little River. Genetic testing revealed the species was unique and additional surveys were conducted to collect more individuals. The research culminated in a paper by Michael A. Perkins, Katharine L. DeVilbiss, Nathan V. Whelan, Rachael A. Hoch, Brena K. Jones, Jason W. Mays, Heather K. Evans, and Sierra B. Benfield published August 7, 2025 that described the new genus and species.

== Taxonomy ==
Phylogenetic results place Ligodonta as a sister to Alasmidonta within the family Unionidae.

== Distribution ==
In contemporary surveys, Ligodonta obscura has been found exclusively within the mainstream of the Little River in Randolph County, North Carolina. However, it is possible that the species could exist in additional waters.
