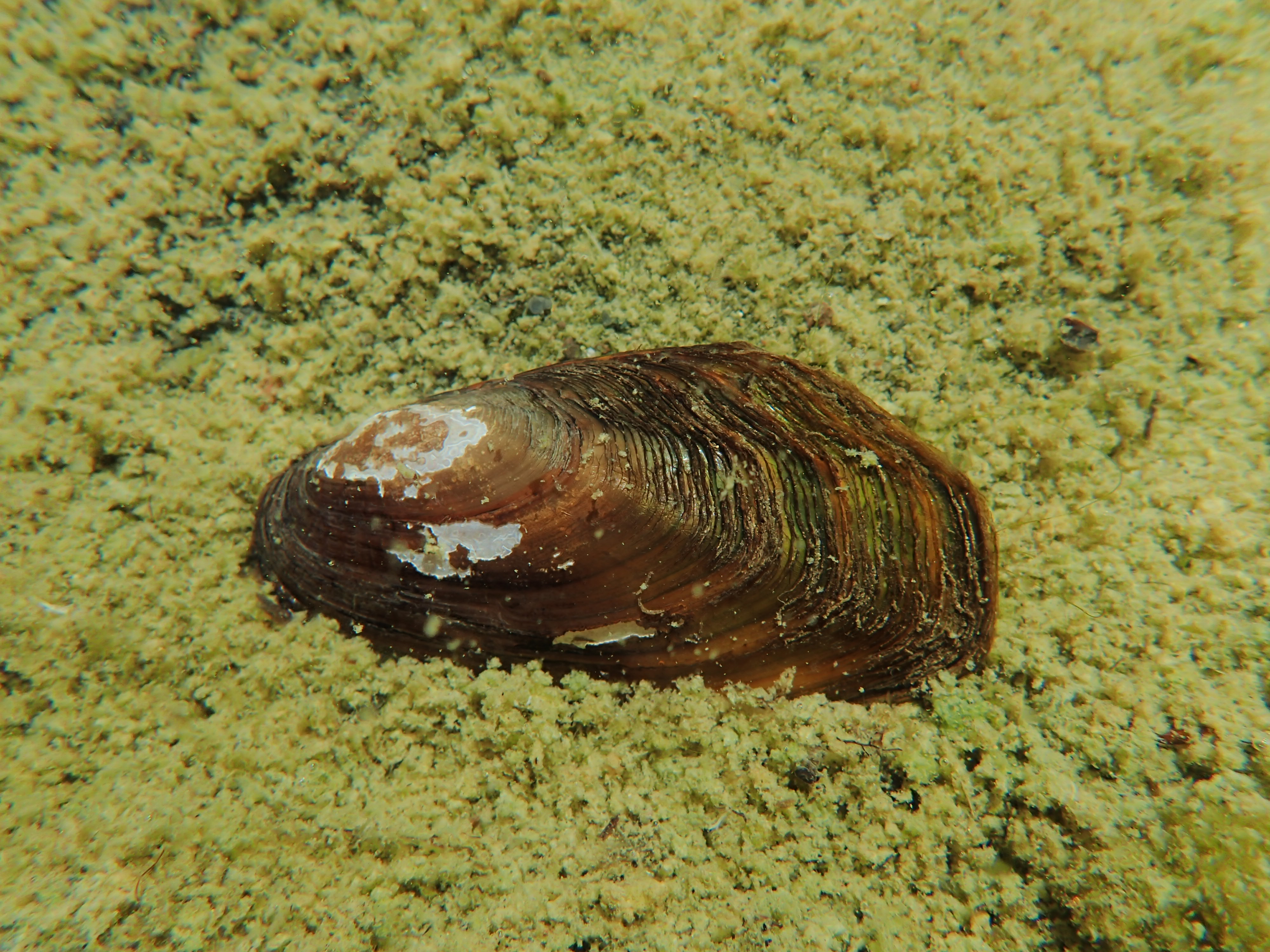
- Mature western ridged mussel

Conservation status
- Vulnerable (IUCN 3.1)

- Vulnerable (NatureServe)

Scientific classification
- Kingdom: Animalia
- Phylum: Mollusca
- Class: Bivalvia
- Order: Unionida
- Family: Unionidae
- Genus: Gonidea; Conrad, 1857
- Species: G. angulata

Binomial name
- Gonidea angulata (Lea, 1838)

= Gonidea =

Genus of bivalves

Gonidea angulata, the western ridged mussel or Rocky Mountain ridged mussel, is a species of freshwater mussel, an aquatic bivalve mollusk in the family Unionidae, the river mussels. It is the only species in the genus Gonidea.

== Description ==
Shell is 125 mm long, 65 mm high, 40 mm wide.

== Distribution ==
The western ridged mussel historically occurred in river basins spanning portions of the western states of California, Idaho, Nevada, Oregon, and Washington, and the Canadian province of British Columbia.

== Conservation status ==
The western ridged mussel has declined significantly throughout much of its range in western North America. Research indicates that the species has experienced a significant reduction in range from the historic distribution (43%), with the southern extent of the species’ range in California having contracted northward approximately 475 miles as compared to the historic range. Live western ridged mussels were not detected at 46% of the 87 sites where it historically occurred and that have been recently revisited.

In Canada, it lives in British Columbia, where the Committee on the Status of Endangered Wildlife in Canada (COSEWIC) has listed it as a species of special concern. The Canadian Species at Risk Act listed it in the List of Wildlife Species at Risk as being a species of special concern in Canada in 2003, and as endangered in 2010.
