= Tacuaremboia =

Scientific classification
- Kingdom: Animalia
- Phylum: Mollusca
- Class: Bivalvia
- Order: Unionida
- Family: Unionidae
- Genus: †Tacuaremboia; Martínez, Figueiras & Da Silva, 1993
- Species: †T. caorsii

Binomial name
- †Tacuaremboia caorsii Martínez, Figueiras & Da Silva, 1993

Fossil bivalve

Tacuaremboia is a Mesozoic freshwater bivalve of big size (about 40 cm).

Material has been found in the Tacuarembó Formation of Uruguay; its type species is Tacuaremboia caorsii.

It was one of the last genus described by Alfredo Figueiras (1915-1991).
