= Venustaconcha =

Scientific classification
- Domain: Eukaryota
- Kingdom: Animalia
- Phylum: Mollusca
- Class: Bivalvia
- Order: Unionida
- Family: Unionidae
- Tribe: Lampsilini
- Genus: Venustaconcha; Frierson, 1927

Genus of bivalves

Venustaconcha is a genus of freshwater mussels, aquatic bivalve mollusks in the family Unionidae.

== Species ==
Species within the genus Venustaconcha include:

- Venustaconcha constricta (Conrad, 1838)
- Venustaconcha ellipsiformis (Conrad, 1836)
- Venustaconcha pleasii (Marsh, 1891)
- Venustaconcha trabalis (Conrad, 1834)
- Venustaconcha troostensis (I. Lea, 1834)
