= Pseudospatha =

Conservation status
- Least Concern (IUCN 3.1)

Scientific classification
- Kingdom: Animalia
- Phylum: Mollusca
- Class: Bivalvia
- Order: Unionida
- Family: Unionidae
- Genus: Pseudospatha; Simpson, 1900
- Species: P. tanganyicensis

Binomial name
- Pseudospatha tanganyicensis (E. A. Smith, 1880)

Synonyms
- Burtonia bourguignati Bourguignat, 1886; Burtonia foai Mabille, 1901; Burtonia livingstoniana Bourguignat, 1883; Burtonia subtriangularis Bourguignat, 1886; Pseudospatha ortmanni Pilsbry & Bequaert, 1927; Pseudospatha stappersi Pilsbry & Bequaert, 1927

Genus of bivalves

Pseudospatha tanganyicensis a species of freshwater mussel, an aquatic bivalve mollusk in the family Unionidae, the river mussels. It is the only species in the genus Pseudospatha.

This species is endemic to Lake Tanganyika where found in Burundi, the Democratic Republic of the Congo, Tanzania, and Zambia. It is common and widespread in the lake.

Pseudospatha is one of three monotypic genera of freshwater mussel that are endemic to Lake Tanganyika, the others being Brazzaea and Grandidieria.
