= Glebula =

Conservation status
- Apparently Secure (NatureServe)

Scientific classification
- Kingdom: Animalia
- Phylum: Mollusca
- Class: Bivalvia
- Order: Unionida
- Family: Unionidae
- Tribe: Lampsilini
- Genus: Glebula; Conrad, 1853
- Species: G. rotundata

Binomial name
- Glebula rotundata (Lamarck, 1819)

Genus of bivalves

Glebula rotundata, the round pearlshell, is a freshwater mussel, and an aquatic bivalve mollusk in the family Unionidae. As the only species in the genus Glebula, it is unusual among unionoid mussels for its ability to tolerate brackish water.

It is found in the drainages of the Gulf Coast, as well as in Arkansas and Oklahoma.

== Description ==
The round pearlshell has a rounded shell shape, typical of its species name, and inhabits freshwater rivers and streams, though it can survive in areas with some salinity.

== Habitat and distribution ==
This species is found primarily in freshwater systems in North America, especially in regions where freshwater meets brackish water, such as estuaries.
