= Uniomerus =

Scientific classification
- Domain: Eukaryota
- Kingdom: Animalia
- Phylum: Mollusca
- Class: Bivalvia
- Order: Unionida
- Family: Unionidae
- Tribe: Quadrulini
- Genus: Uniomerus; Conrad, 1853

Genus of bivalves

Uniomerus is a genus of freshwater mussels, aquatic bivalve mollusks in the family Unionidae, the river mussels.

== Species ==
Recent species placed within the genus Uniomerus include:

- Uniomerus carolinianus (Bosc, 1801)
- Uniomerus columbensis (Lea, 1857)
- Uniomerus declivis (Say, 1831)
- Uniomerus tetralasmus (Say, 1831)

== Prehistoric species ==
- Uniomerus hanleyi
