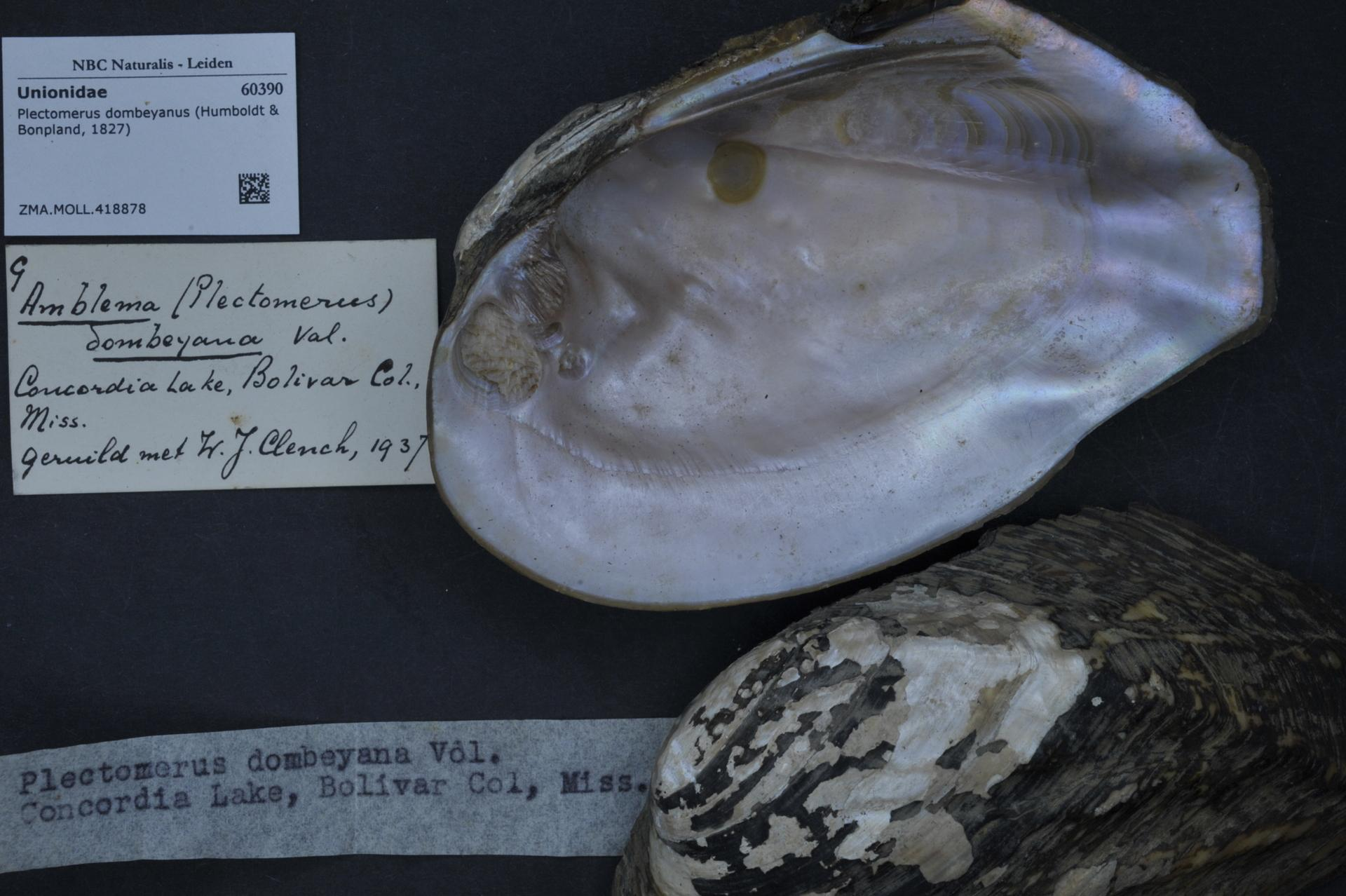

Conservation status
- Least Concern (IUCN 3.1)

- Secure (NatureServe)

Scientific classification
- Kingdom: Animalia
- Phylum: Mollusca
- Class: Bivalvia
- Order: Unionida
- Family: Unionidae
- Tribe: Amblemini
- Genus: Plectomerus; Conrad, 1853
- Species: P. dombeyanus

Binomial name
- Plectomerus dombeyanus (Valenciennes in Humboldt & Bonpland, 1827)

Synonyms
- Amblema dombeyanus; Quadrula trapezoides

= Plectomerus =

Genus of bivalves

Plectomerus is a monotypic genus of freshwater mussels in the family Unionidae, the river mussels. The sole species in the genus is Plectomerus dombeyanus. Its common name is bankclimber, as it can be found buried in steep slopes a considerable distance from water.

== Distribution ==
This species is native to the Southeastern United States, from Texas to Florida, ranging as far north as Illinois.

== Description ==
This mussel is not sexually dimorphic; the sexes appear the same. The shell is somewhat rhomboidal shaped, up to 150 millimetres (5.9 in) long. The shell is greenish brown to brown, darkening to black with age, and its nacre is usually deep purple.
