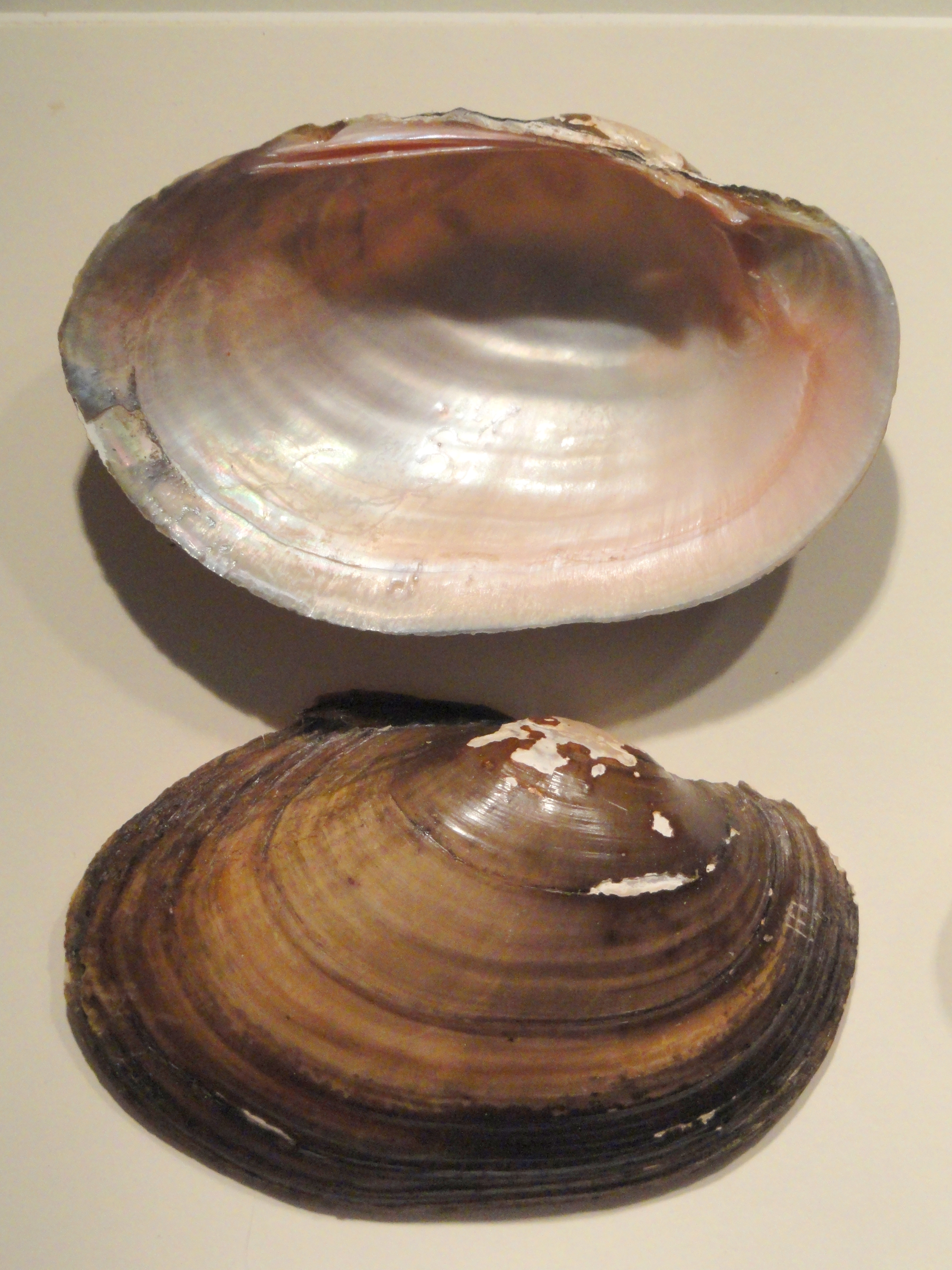

Conservation status
- Near Threatened (IUCN 3.1)

- Vulnerable (NatureServe)

Scientific classification
- Kingdom: Animalia
- Phylum: Mollusca
- Class: Bivalvia
- Order: Unionida
- Family: Unionidae
- Tribe: Lampsilini
- Genus: Atlanticoncha; Smith, Pfeiffer & Johnson, 2020
- Species: A. ochracea

Binomial name
- Atlanticoncha ochracea (Say, 1817)

Synonyms
- List: Anodonta fluviatilis (Gmelin, 1791); Lampsilis (Lampsilis) ochracea (Say, 1817); Lampsilis (Lampsilis) ochraceus (Say, 1817); Lampsilis ochracea (Say, 1817); Lampsilis rosea Rafinesque, 1820; Leptodea ochracea (Say, 1817); Ligumia ochracea (Say, 1817); Margarita (Anodonta) fluviatilis (Gmelin, 1791); Margarita (Unio) ochraceus (Say, 1817); Margaron (Anodonta) fluviatilis (Gmelin, 1791); Margaron (Unio) boydianus (Lea, 1840); Margaron (Unio) crocatus (Lea, 1841); Margaron (Unio) ochraceus (Say, 1817); Mytilus fluviatilis Gmelin, 1791; Unio boydianus Lea, 1840; Unio crocatus Lea, 1841; Unio ochraceus Say, 1817; Unio rosaceus Conrad, 1849

= Atlanticoncha =

Species of bivalve

Atlanticoncha ochracea, the tidewater mucket, is a species of freshwater mussel, an aquatic bivalve mollusc in the family Unionidae, the river mussels. Formerly classified in the now-defunct genus Leptodea, it is now considered the only member of the monotypic genus Atlanticoncha.

This species is native to the east coast of the United States and Canada (New Brunswick and Nova Scotia).
