= Hyriopsis =

Scientific classification
- Domain: Eukaryota
- Kingdom: Animalia
- Phylum: Mollusca
- Class: Bivalvia
- Order: Unionida
- Family: Unionidae
- Genus: Hyriopsis; Conrad, 1853

Genus of bivalves

Hyriopsis is a genus of bivalves belonging to the family Unionidae.

The species of this genus are found in Southeastern Asia.

Species:

- Hyriopsis altealata Haas, 1920
- Hyriopsis bialata Simpson, 1900
- Hyriopsis bogatchevi Modell, 1950
- Hyriopsis cumingii (Lea, 1852)
- Hyriopsis deccanensis (J.de C.Sowerby, 1840)
- Hyriopsis delaportei (Crosse & P.Fischer, 1876)
- Hyriopsis desowitzi Brandt, 1974
- Hyriopsis hannae Modell, 1941
- Hyriopsis khoratensis J.M.Pfeiffer, D.L.Graf, K.S.Cummings & L.M.Page, 2021
- Hyriopsis kratiensis J.M.Pfeiffer, D.L.Graf, K.S.Cummings & L.M.Page, 2021
- Hyriopsis krausi Wenz, 1932
- Hyriopsis lindholmi (Zykin, 1979)
- Hyriopsis mabutii Oyama
- Hyriopsis myersiana (I.Lea, 1856)
- Hyriopsis panhai Jeratthitikul, Paphatmethin, Zieritz, Lopes-Lima & Peng Bun Ngor, 2021
- Hyriopsis phuphaniensis J.M.Pfeiffer, D.L.Graf, K.S.Cummings & L.M.Page, 2021
- Hyriopsis sakhonensis J.M.Pfeiffer, D.L.Graf, K.S.Cummings & L.M.Page, 2021
- Hyriopsis schlegelii (Martens, 1861)
- Hyriopsis subschlegeli Haas, 1920
- Hyriopsis sulcata (Lindholm, 1932)
- Hyriopsis velthuizeni (Schepman, 1896)
