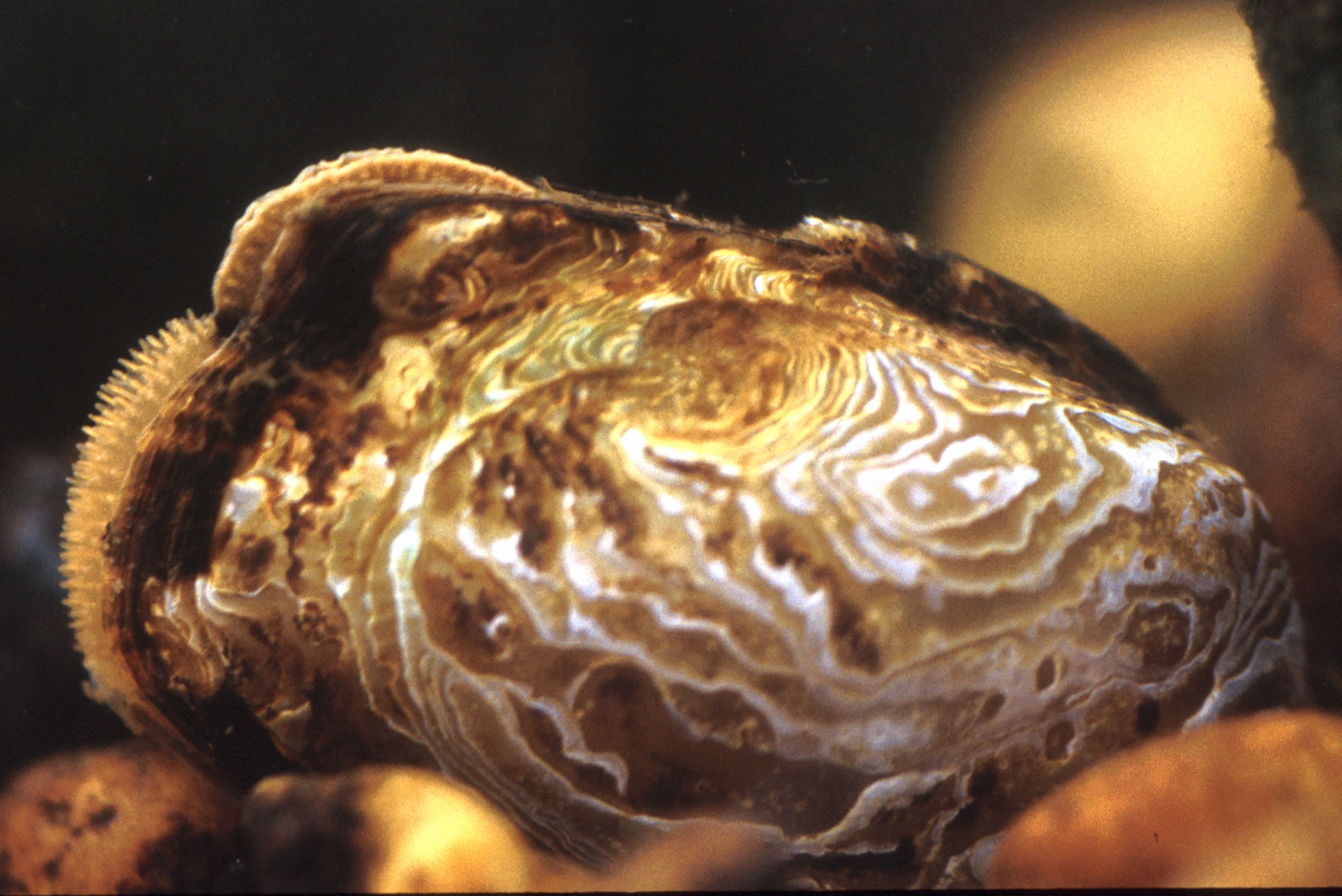
- A live individual of Pegias fabula

Conservation status
- Critically Endangered (IUCN 3.1)

- Critically Imperiled (NatureServe)

Scientific classification
- Kingdom: Animalia
- Phylum: Mollusca
- Class: Bivalvia
- Order: Unionida
- Family: Unionidae
- Tribe: Anodontini
- Genus: Pegias; Simpson, 1900
- Species: P. fabula

Binomial name
- Pegias fabula (I. Lea, 1838)

= Pegias =

Genus of bivalves

Pegias is a monotypic genus of freshwater mussels in the family Unionidae. This genus contains the single species Pegias fabula, known commonly as the littlewing pearlymussel.

== Distribution ==
The species is native to the Cumberland and Tennessee River systems in the United States, where it is present in streams in North Carolina, Kentucky, Virginia, and Tennessee. It has been a federally listed endangered species of the United States since 1988.

== Description ==
This mussel is up to 3.8 centimetres (1.5 in) long by 1.3 centimetres (0.51 in) wide. The outer surface of the shell is light greenish or dark yellowish, but it is often eroded off, leaving the shell chalky whitish in color.

== Threat of extinction ==
This mussel has been extirpated from most streams where it once occurred, including any in the state of Alabama. There are between six and twenty remaining populations, most of which contain fewer than 500 individuals.

The main threat to the species is bad water quality, especially due to acidic mine drainage. Other threats include oil and gas exploration, road construction, channeling of the rivers, logging, agriculture, and pesticides.
