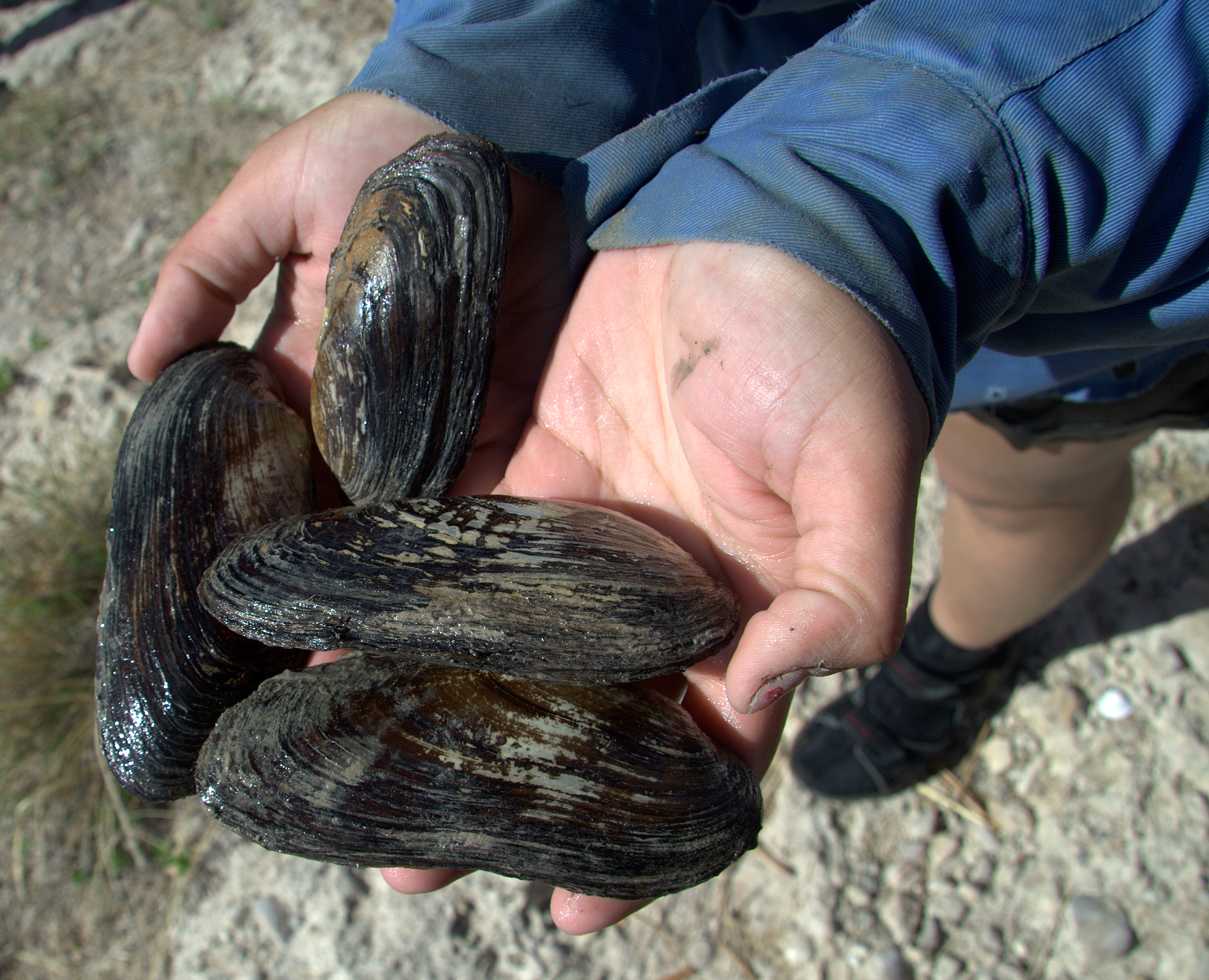
- Popenaias popeii

Scientific classification
- Domain: Eukaryota
- Kingdom: Animalia
- Phylum: Mollusca
- Class: Bivalvia
- Order: Unionida
- Family: Unionidae
- Tribe: Popenaiadini
- Genus: Popenaias; Frierson, 1927

= Popenaias =

Genus of bivalves

Popenaias is a genus of freshwater mussels, aquatic bivalve molluscs in the family Unionidae, the river mussels.

== Species ==
Species within the genus Popenaias include:

- Popenaias buckleyi
- Popenaias metallica
- Popenaias popeii
- Popenaias tehuantepecensis
