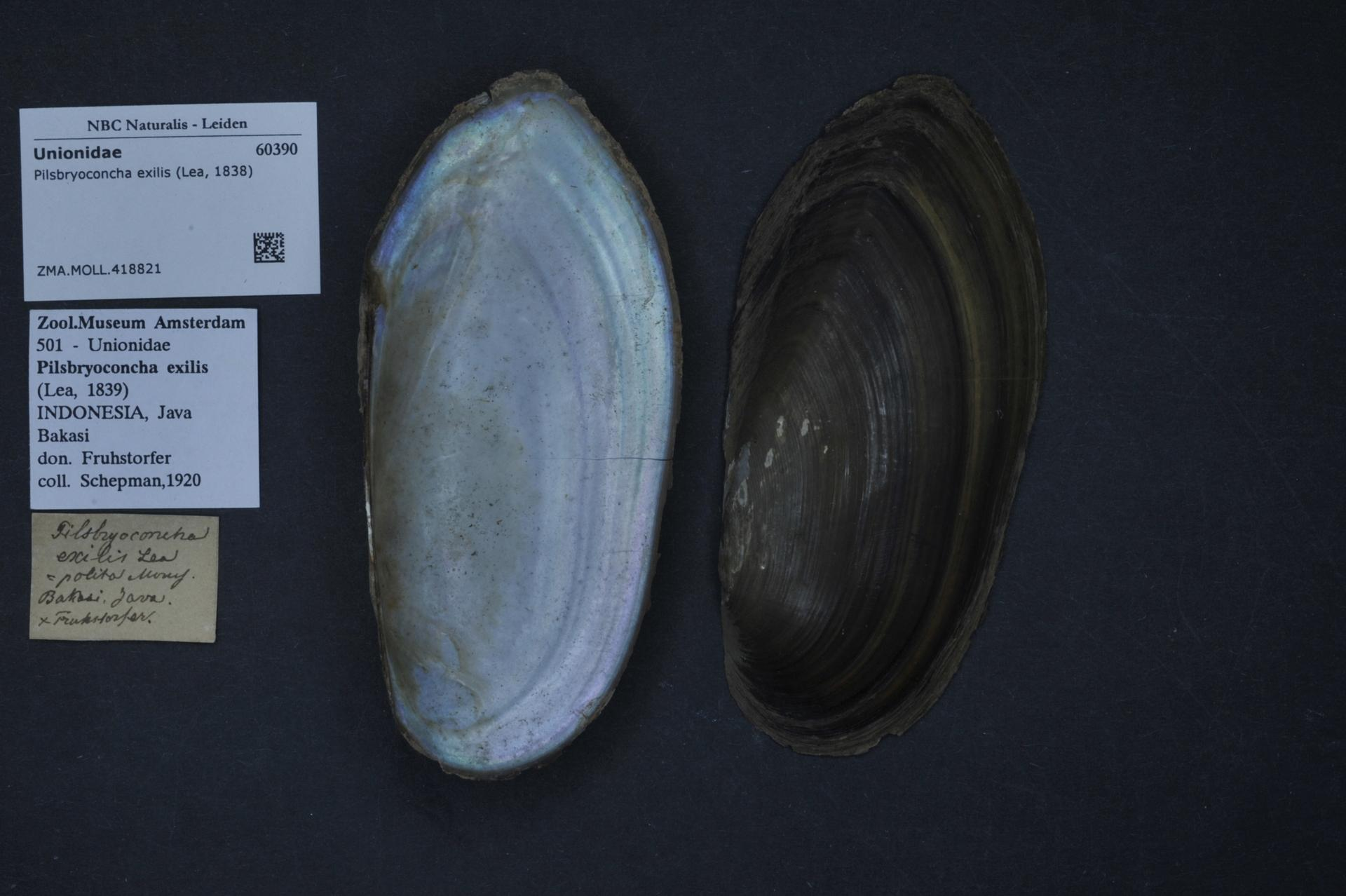
- Pilsbryoconcha exilis

Scientific classification
- Domain: Eukaryota
- Kingdom: Animalia
- Phylum: Mollusca
- Class: Bivalvia
- Order: Unionida
- Family: Unionidae
- Genus: Pilsbryoconcha; Simpson, 1900

= Pilsbryoconcha =

Genus of bivalves

Pilsbryoconcha is a genus of bivalves belonging to the family Unionidae.

The species of this genus are found in Southeastern Asia.

Species:

- Pilsbryoconcha carinifera (Conrad, 1837)
- Pilsbryoconcha compressa (Martens, 1860)
- Pilsbryoconcha exilis (I.Lea, 1838)
- Pilsbryoconcha expressa (von Martens, 1900)
- Pilsbryoconcha lemeslei (Morelet, 1875)
- Pilsbryoconcha linguaeformis Morelet, 1875
- Pilsbryoconcha suilla von Martens, 1902
