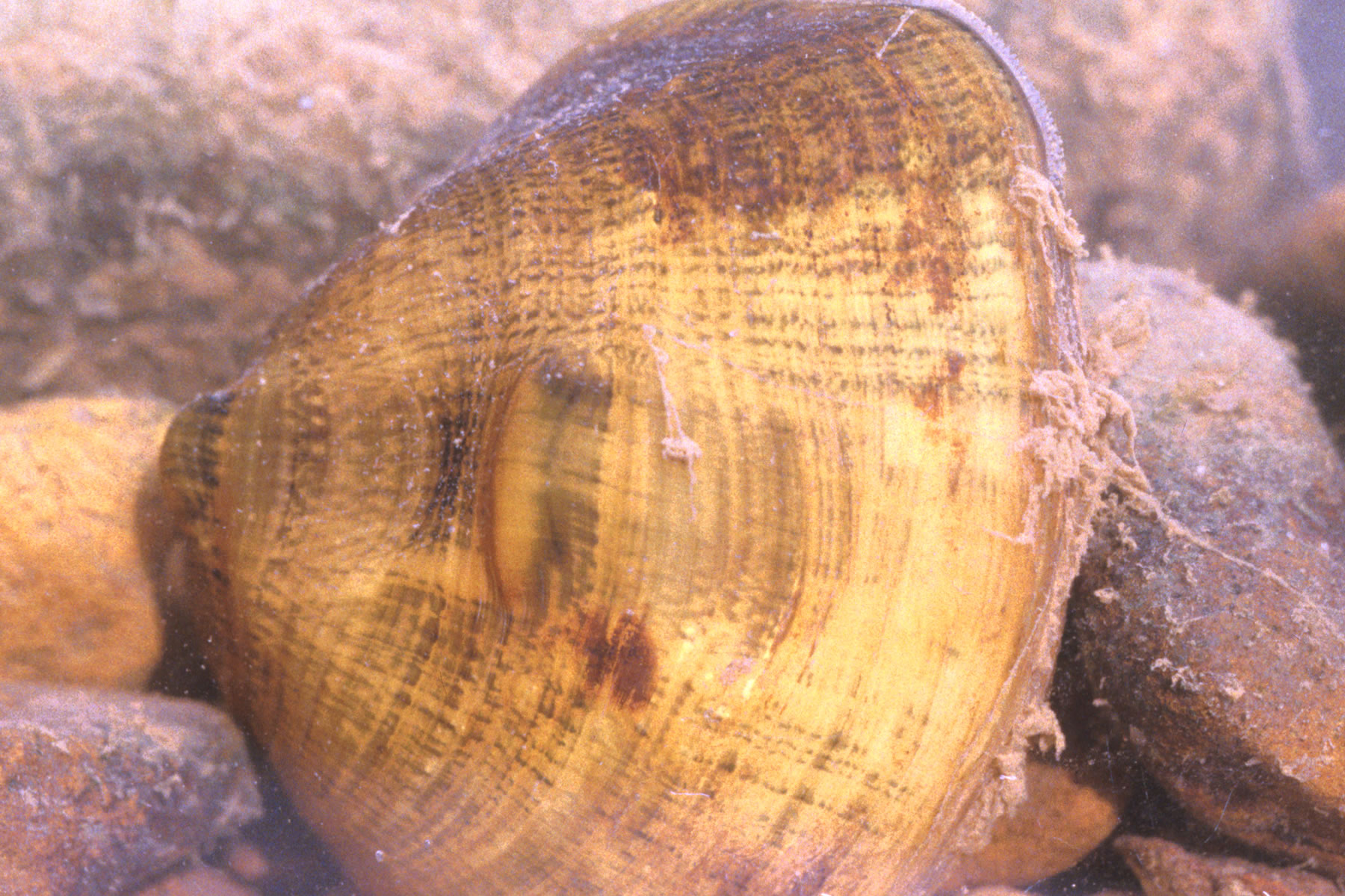

Conservation status
- Least Concern (IUCN 3.1)

- Secure (NatureServe)

Scientific classification
- Kingdom: Animalia
- Phylum: Mollusca
- Class: Bivalvia
- Order: Unionida
- Family: Unionidae
- Tribe: Lampsilini
- Genus: Obliquaria; Rafinesque, 1820
- Species: O. reflexa

Binomial name
- Obliquaria reflexa Rafinesque, 1820

= Obliquaria =

Species of bivalve

Obliquaria reflexa, commonly known as the threehorn wartyback or three-horn wartyback, is a species of freshwater mussel, an aquatic bivalve mollusk in the family Unionidae, the river mussels. It is the only species in the genus Obliquaria.
