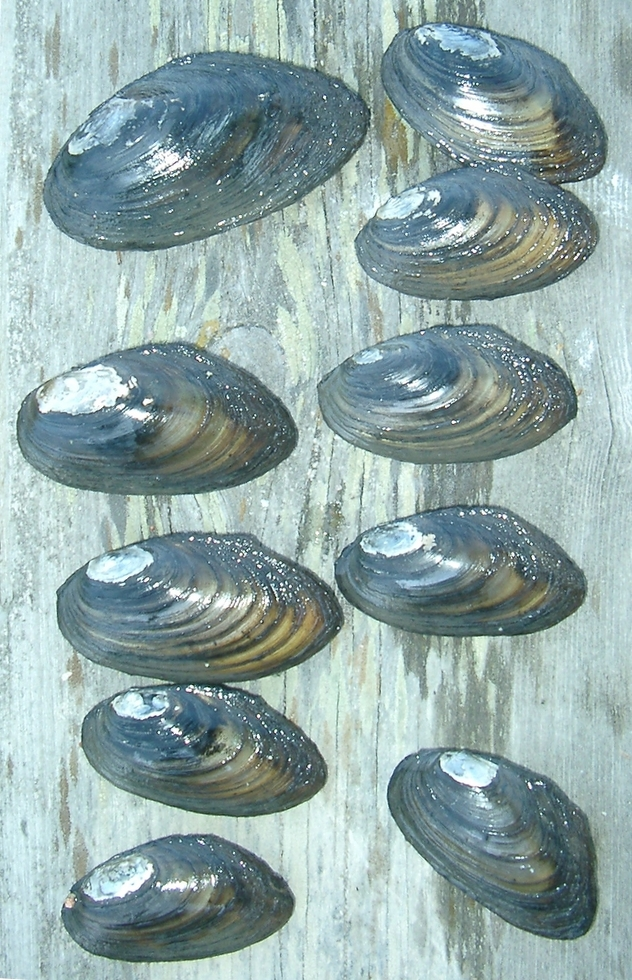
- 10 live individuals of Pseudanodonta complanata

Scientific classification
- Domain: Eukaryota
- Kingdom: Animalia
- Phylum: Mollusca
- Class: Bivalvia
- Order: Unionida
- Family: Unionidae
- Tribe: Anodontini
- Genus: Pseudanodonta; Bourguignat, 1876

Type species
- Anodonta complanata Rossmässler, 1835

Synonyms
- Anodonta (Pseudanodonta) Bourguignat, 1877; Pseudanodonta (Complanatiana) Servain, 1891 (a junior synonym); Pseudanodonta (Elongatiana) Servain, 1888 (a junior synonym); Pseudanodonta (Rayana) Servain, 1890 (a junior synonym); Pseudanodonta (Rossmassleriana) Servain, 1881 (a junior synonym); Pseudanodonta (Scrupeana) Servain, 1891 (a junior synonym); Pseudodon (Pseudanodonta) Bourguignat, 1877 (original rank)

= Pseudanodonta =

Genus of bivalves

Pseudanodonta is a genus of freshwater mussels, aquatic bivalve mollusks in the family Unionidae, the river mussels.

== Species ==
Species within this genus include:

- Pseudanodonta complanata (Rossmässler, 1835)
- Pseudanodonta middendorffi (Siemaschko, 1848): synonym of Pseudanodonta complanata (Rossmässler, 1835)
