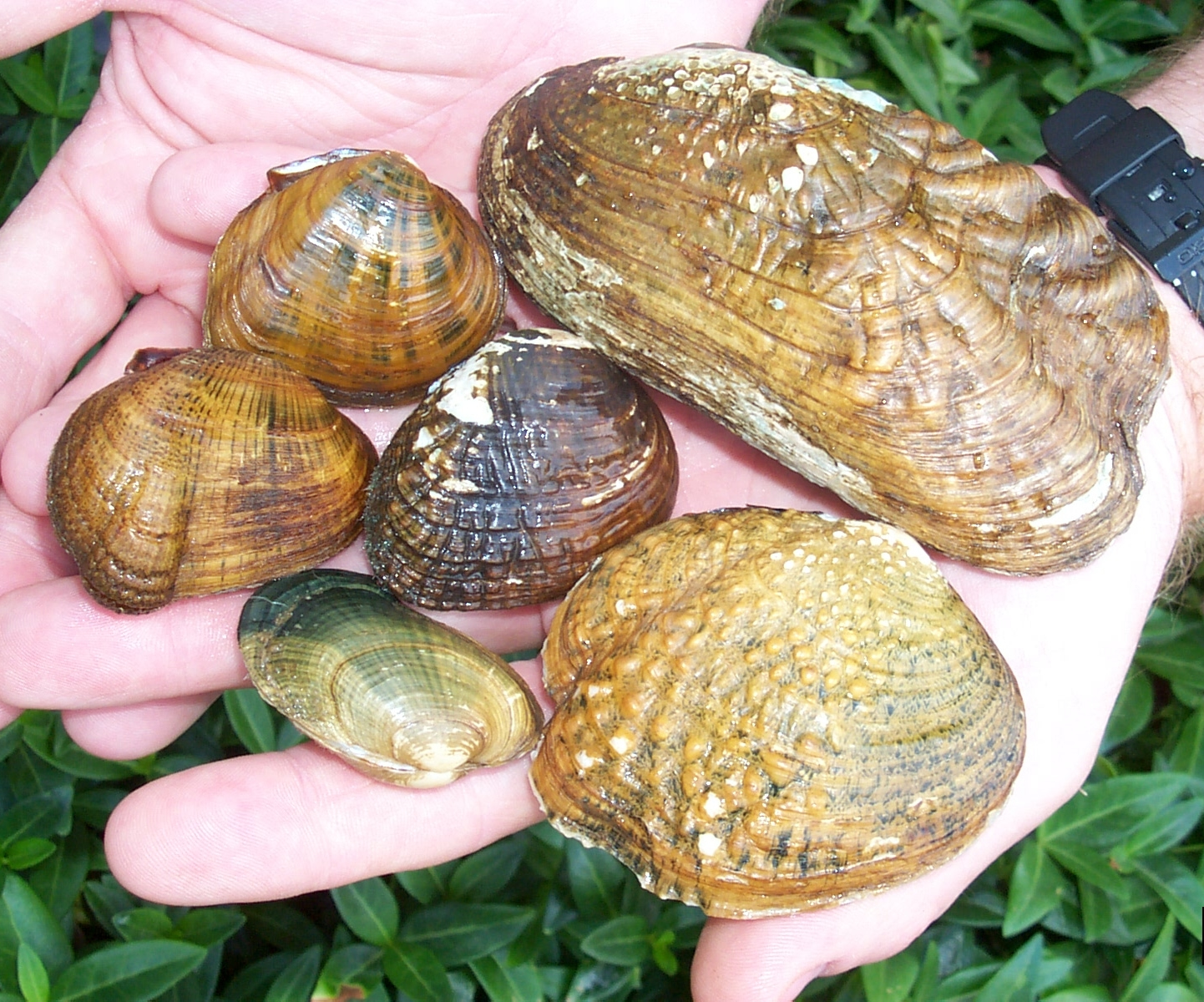
- Six endangered species of Unionidae

Scientific classification
- Kingdom: Animalia
- Phylum: Mollusca
- Class: Bivalvia
- Order: Unionida
- Superfamily: Unionoidea
- Family: Unionidae; Fleming, 1828

Genera
- See text

= Unionidae =

Unionidae Temporal range: Middle Jurassic - present, 177–0 Ma

Family of molluscs

The Unionidae are a family of freshwater mussels, the largest in the order Unionida, the bivalve molluscs sometimes known as river mussels, or simply as unionids.

The range of distribution for this family is world-wide. It is at its most diverse in North America, with about 297 recognised taxa, but China and Southeast Asia also support very diverse faunas.

Freshwater mussels occupy a wide range of habitats, but most often occupy lotic waters, i.e. flowing water such as rivers, streams and creeks.

== Origin and early diversification ==
The recent phylogenetic study reveals that the Unionidae most likely originated in Southeast and East Asia in the Jurassic, with the earliest expansions into North America and Africa (since the mid-Cretaceous) followed by the colonization of Europe and India (since the Paleocene).

== Life history ==
Unionidae burrow into the substrate, with their posterior margins exposed. They pump water through the incurrent aperture, obtaining oxygen and food. They remove phytoplankton and zooplankton, as well as suspended bacteria, fungal spores, and dissolved organic matter. Despite extensive laboratory studies, which of these filtrates unionoids actually process remains uncertain. In high densities, they have the ability to influence water clarity but filtration rates are dependent on water temperature, current velocity, and particle size and concentration. In addition, gill morphology can determine particle size filtered, as well as the rate.

== Reproduction ==
Aggressive mimicry in Lampsilis fasciola

Unionidae are distinguished by a unique and complex lifecycle. Most unionids are of separate sex, although some species, such as Elliptio complanata, are known to be hermaphroditic.

The sperm is ejected from the mantle cavity through the male's excurrent aperture and taken into the female's mantle cavity through the incurrent aperture. Fertilised eggs move from the gonads to the gills (marsupia) where they further ripen and metamorph into glochidia, the first larval stage. Mature glochidia are released by the female and then attach to the gills, fins, or skin of a host fish. A cyst is quickly formed around the glochidia, and they stay on the fish for several weeks or months before they fall off as juvenile mussels, which then bury themselves in the sediment.

Some of the species in the Unionidae, notably in the Lampsilini tribe, have evolved a remarkable reproductive strategy. The edge of the female's body that protrudes from the valves of the shell develops into an imitation of a small fish complete with markings and false eyes. This decoy moves in the current and attracts the attention of real fish. Some fish see the decoy as prey, while others see a conspecific, i.e. a member of their own species. Whatever they see, they approach for a closer look and the mussel releases huge numbers of larvae from her gills, dousing the inquisitive fish with her tiny, parasitic young. These glochidial larvae are drawn into the fish's gills, where they attach and trigger a tissue response that forms a small cyst in which the young mussel resides. It feeds by breaking down and digesting the tissue of the fish within the cyst.

Sex is determined by a region located on the mitochondrial DNA, the male open reading frame (M-ORF) and female open-reading frame (F-ORF). Hermaphroditic mussels lack these regions and contain a female-like open-reading frame dubbed hermaphroditic open-reading frame (H-ORF). In many mussels, the hermaphroditic state is ancestral and the male sex evolved later. This region of the mitochondria also may be responsible for the evolution of doubly uniparental inheritance seen in freshwater mussels.

== Taxonomy ==
=== Genera by taxonomic order ===
The following classification is based on MolluscaBase and the MUSSEL Project database:

- Subfamily Ambleminae
  - Tribe Lampsilini
    - Genus Epioblasma
    - Genus Lampsilis
    - Genus Potamilus
    - Genus Actinonaias
    - Genus Cambarunio
    - Genus Obovaria
    - Genus Toxolasma
    - Genus Medionidus
    - Genus Ptychobranchus
    - Genus Disconaias
    - Genus Leaunio
    - Genus Venustaconcha
    - Genus Cyrtonaias
    - Genus Hamiota
    - Genus Sagittunio
    - Genus Truncilla
    - Genus Villosa
    - Genus Arotonaias
    - Genus Cyprogenia
    - Genus Delphinonaias
    - Genus Ortmanniana
    - Genus Pachynaias
    - Genus Atlanticoncha
    - Genus Dromus
    - Genus Ellipsaria
    - Genus Friersonia
    - Genus Glebula
    - Genus Lemiox
    - Genus Ligumia
    - Genus Obliquaria
    - Genus Paetulunio
  - Tribe Pleurobemini
    - Genus Elliptio
    - Genus Pleurobema
    - Genus Fusconaia
    - Genus Plethobasus
    - Genus Pleuronaia
    - Genus Parvaspina
    - Genus Elliptoideus
    - Genus Eurynia
    - Genus Hemistena
  - Tribe Popenaiadini
    - Genus Nephronaias
    - Genus Psoronaias
    - Genus Barynaias
    - Genus Popenaias
    - Genus Sphenonaias
    - Genus Micronaias
    - Genus Nephritica
    - Genus Reticulatus
    - Genus Martensnaias
  - Tribe Quadrulini
    - Genus Cyclonaias
    - Genus Theliderma
    - Genus Uniomerus
    - Genus Quadrula
    - Genus Megalonaias
    - Genus Tritogonia
  - Tribe Amblemini
    - Genus Amblema
    - Genus Reginaia
    - Genus Plectomerus
- Subfamily Unioninae
  - Tribe Anodontini
    - Subtribe Alasmidontina
      - Genus Alasmidonta
      - Genus Lasmigona
      - Genus Ligodonta
      - Genus Pyganodon
      - Genus Utterbackiana
      - Genus Strophitus
      - Genus Utterbackia
      - Genus Anodontoides
      - Genus Arcidens
      - Genus Pseudodontoideus
      - Genus Pegias
      - Genus Simpsonaias
    - Subtribe Cristariina
      - Genus Sinanodonta
      - Genus Buldowskia
      - Genus Cristaria
      - Genus Anemina
      - Genus Beringiana
      - Genus Pletholophus
      - Genus Simpsonella
      - Genus Amuranodonta
    - Subtribe Anodontina
      - Genus Anodonta
      - Genus Pseudanodonta
  - Tribe Unionini
    - Genus Unio
    - Genus Nodularia
    - Genus Aculamprotula
    - Genus Acuticosta
    - Genus Cuneopsis
    - Genus Inversiunio
    - Genus Pseudobaphia
    - Genus Rhombuniopsis
    - Genus Lepidodesma
    - Genus Pseudocuneopsis
    - Genus Schistodesmus
    - Genus Arcuneopsis
    - Genus Diaurora
    - Genus Middendorffinaia
    - Genus Protunio
  - Tribe Lanceolariini
    - Genus Lanceolaria
- Subfamily Gonideinae
  - Tribe Pseudodontini
    - Subtribe Pilsbryoconchina
      - Genus Sundadontina
      - Genus Monodontina
      - Genus Pilsbryoconcha
      - Genus Bineurus
      - Genus Thaiconcha
      - Genus Namkongnaia
      - Genus Nyeinchanconcha
    - Subtribe Pseudodontina
      - Genus Pseudodon
  - Tribe Contradentini
    - Genus Lens
    - Genus Yaukthwa
    - Genus Physunio
    - Genus Trapezoideus
    - Genus Pressidens
    - Genus Solenaia
  - Tribe Lamprotulini
    - Genus Lamprotula
    - Genus Potomida
    - Genus Schepmania
    - Genus Discomya
    - Genus Pronodularia
  - Tribe Rectidentini
    - Genus Hyriopsis
    - Genus Ensidens
    - Genus Ctenodesma
    - Genus Elongaria
    - Genus Khairuloconcha
    - Genus Prohyriopsis
    - Genus Rectidens
  - Tribe Gonideni
    - Genus Ptychorhynchus
    - Genus Sinosolenaia
    - Genus Inversidens
    - Genus Leguminaia
    - Genus Parvasolenaia
    - Genus Gonidea
    - Genus Koreosolenaia
    - Genus Microcondylaea
    - Genus Obovalis
    - Genus Pseudodontopsis
  - Tribe Chamberlainini
    - Genus Sinohyriopsis
    - Genus Chamberlainia
    - Genus Caudiculatus
- Subfamily Parreysiinae
  - Tribe Coelaturini
    - Genus Coelatura
    - Genus Nitia
    - Genus Nyassunio
    - Genus Prisodontopsis
    - Genus Brazzaea
    - Genus Grandidieria
    - Genus Moncetia
    - Genus Pseudospatha
  - Tribe Indochinellini
    - Genus Indonaia
    - Genus Scabies
    - Genus Radiatula
    - Genus Harmandia
    - Genus Indochinella
    - Genus Scabiellus
    - Genus Unionetta
  - Tribe Lamellidentini
    - Genus Lamellidens
    - Genus Trapezidens
    - Genus Arcidopsis
  - Tribe Leoparreysiini
    - Genus Leoparreysia
  - Tribe Parreysiini
    - Genus Parreysia
    - Genus Balwantia
- Genus Haasodonta (subfamily incertae sedis)
- Genus Germainaia (subfamily incertae sedis)
- Genus Tacuaremboia (subfamily incertae sedis)
- Subfamily Modellnaiinae
  - Genus Modellnaia

=== Genera by alphabetic order and region ===
Widespread

- Anodonta
- Potomida
- Unio

Africa

- Brazzaea
- Coelatura
- Germainaia
- Grandidieria
- Mweruella
- Nitia
- Nyassunio
- Prisodontopsis
- Pseudospatha

Central America and Mexico

- Arotonaias
- Barynaias
- Cyrtonaias
- Delphinonaias
- Disconaias
- Friersonia
- Martensnaias
- Micronaias
- Nephritica
- Nephronaias
- Pachynaias
- Popenaias
- Psoronaias
- Psorula
- Reticulatus
- Sphenonaias

Eastern Asia

- Aculamprotula
- Acuticosta
- Anemina
- Arconaia
- BineurusC. T. Simpson, 1900
- Caudiculatus
- Chamberlainia
- Contradens
- Cristaria
- Ctenodesma
- Cuneopsis
- Discomya
- Elongaria
- Ensidens
- Harmandia
- Hyriopsis
- Inversidens
- Inversiunio
- Lamprotula
- Lanceolaria
- Lepidodesma
- Modellnaia
- Monodontina Conrad, 1853
- Nodularia
- Oxynaia
- Physunio
- Pilsbryoconcha
- Pressidens
- Prohyriopsis
- Pronodularia
- Protunio
- Pseudobaphia
- Pseudodon
- Ptychorhynchus
- Rectidens
- Rhombuniopsis
- Scabies
- Schepmania
- Schistodesmus
- Simpsonella
- Sinanodonta
- Solenaia
- Sundadontina Bolotov et al., 2020
- Thaiconcha Bolotov et al., 2020
- Unionetta

Europe

- Microcondylaea
- Pseudanodonta

India

- Arcidopsis
- Lamellidens
- Parreysia
- Radiatula
- Trapezoideus
- Yaukthwa

Middle East

- Leguminaia
- Pseudodontopsis

New Guinea

- Haasodonta

North America

- Actinonaias
- Alasmidonta
- Amblema
- Anodontoides
- Arcidens
- Cyprogenia
- Dromus
- Ellipsaria
- Elliptio
- Elliptoideus
- Epioblasma
- Fusconaia
- Glebula
- Gonidea
- Hamiota
- Hemistena
- Lampsilis
- Lasmigona
- Lemiox
- Leptodea
- Ligumia
- Medionidus
- Megalonaias
- Obliquaria
- Obovaria
- Pegias
- Plectomerus
- Plethobasus
- Pleurobema
- Pleuronaia
- Potamilus
- Psoronaias Crosse & P. Fischer, 1894
- Ptychobranchus
- Pyganodon
- Quadrula
- Reginaia
- Rotundaria
- Simpsonaias
- Strophitus
- Theliderma
- Toxolasma
- Truncilla
- Uniomerus
- Utterbackia
- Venustaconcha
- Villosa

South America

- Tacuaremboia

== Fossilization and taphonomic implications ==
In large enough quantities, unionid shells can have enough of an impact on environmental conditions to affect the ability of organic remains in the local environment to fossilize. For example, in the Dinosaur Park Formation, fossil hadrosaur eggshell is rare because the breakdown of tannins from local coniferous vegetation would have caused the ancient waters to become acidic. Eggshell fragments are present in only two microfossil sites, both of which are dominated by the preserved shells of invertebrate life, including unionids. The slow dissolution of these shells releasing calcium carbonate into the water raised the water's pH high enough to prevent the eggshell fragments from dissolving before they could be fossilized.
