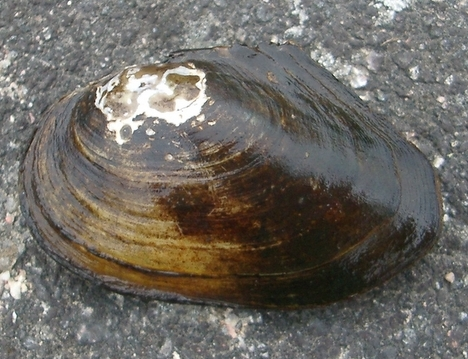
- A live duck mussel, Anodonta anatina

Scientific classification
- Kingdom: Animalia
- Phylum: Mollusca
- Class: Bivalvia
- Order: Unionida
- Family: Unionidae
- Tribe: Anodontini
- Genus: Anodonta; Lamarck, 1799

= Anodonta =

Anodonta Temporal range: Cretaceous–Recent

Genus of bivalves

Anodonta is a genus of freshwater mussels in the family Unionidae, the river mussels.

== Species (and previous species) ==
Species in this genus include:

- Anodonta anatina Linné, 1758 – duck mussel
- Anodonta beringiana Middendorff, 1851 – Yukon floater; now Beringiana beringiana
- Anodonta californiensis I. Lea, 1852 – California floater
- Anodonta cataracta Say, 1817 – eastern floater; now Pyganodon cataracta
- Anodonta cowperiana I. Lea, 1840 – barrel floater
- Anodonta cygnea Linné, 1758 – swan mussel
- Anodonta dejecta Lewis, 1875 – woebegone floater; synonym for A. californiensis
- Anodonta gibbosa Say, 1824 – inflated floater; now Pyganodon gibbosa
- Anodonta hartfieldorum J. D. Williams, Bogan & Garner, 2009- Cypress Floater
- Anodonta heardi M. E. Gordon and Hoeh, 1995 – Apalachicola floater; now Utterbackia heardi
- Anodonta imbecillis Say, 1829 – Paper pondshell ; now Utterbackia imbecillis
- Anodonta implicata Say, 1829 – alewife floater; now Utterbackiana implicata
- Anodonta kennerlyi I. Lea, 1860 – western floater
- Anodonta nuttalliana Lea, 1838 – winged floater
- Anodonta oregonensis I. Lea, 1838 – Oregon floater
- Anodonta peggyae Johnson, 1965 – Florida floater; now Utterbackia peggyae
- Anodonta pseudodopsis Locard, 1883 – synonym for A. anatina
- Anodonta suborbiculata Say, 1831 - flat floater; now Utterbackiana suborbiculata
- Anodonta wahlamatensis I. Lea, 1838 – Willamette floater; synonym for Anodonta nuttalliana
