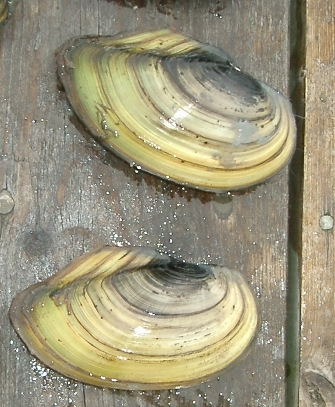

Conservation status
- Least Concern (IUCN 3.1)

Scientific classification
- Kingdom: Animalia
- Phylum: Mollusca
- Class: Bivalvia
- Order: Unionida
- Family: Unionidae
- Genus: Anodonta
- Species: A. cygnea

Binomial name
- Anodonta cygnea (Linnaeus, 1758)
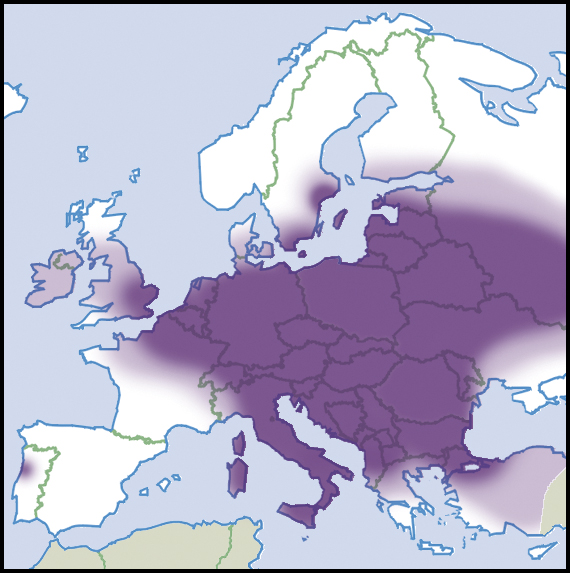
- Distribution of Anodonta cygnea in Europe.

= Swan mussel =

Species of bivalve

The swan mussel, Anodonta cygnea, is a large species of freshwater mussel, an aquatic bivalve mollusc in the family Unionidae, the river mussels.

Because of its morphological variability and its wide range of distribution, there are over 500 synonyms for this species.

== Shell description ==
The shell is thin but large (approximately 10 to 20 cm) and rather flat, even at the umbo. The shell color is often pale greenish or brownish. It differs from Anodonta anatina in being larger shell with straighter, more parallel dorsal and ventral margins; the growth lines of the inner, oldest part of the shell are finer and shallower, and reach the margin.

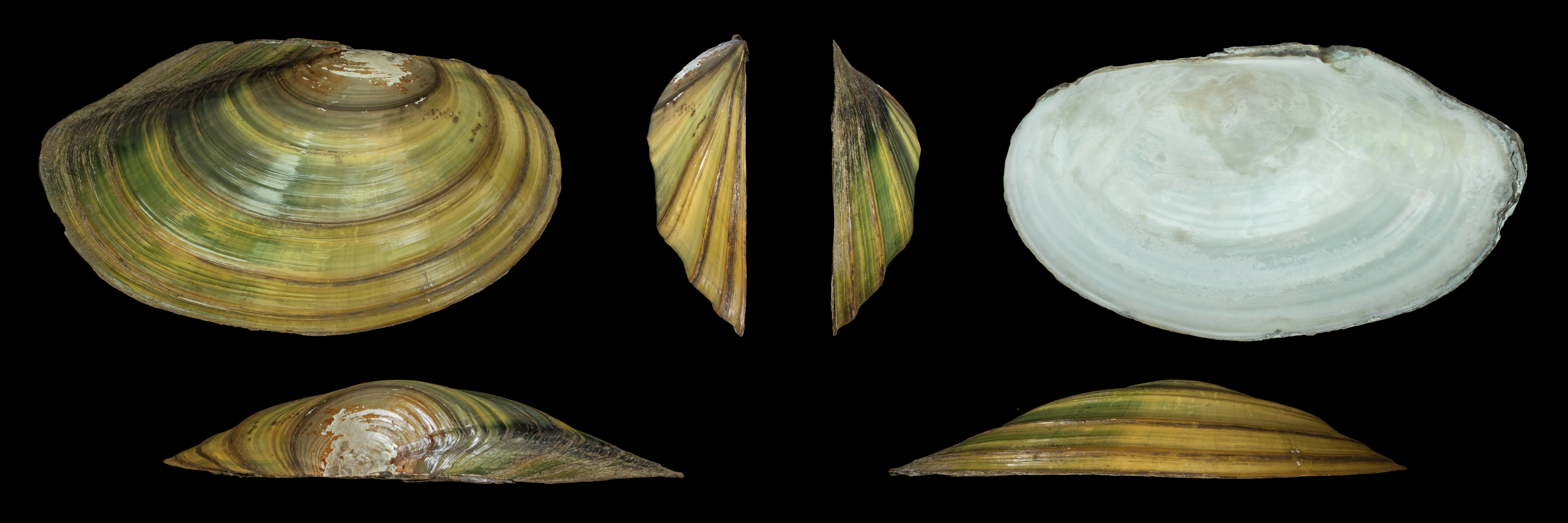
Right valve

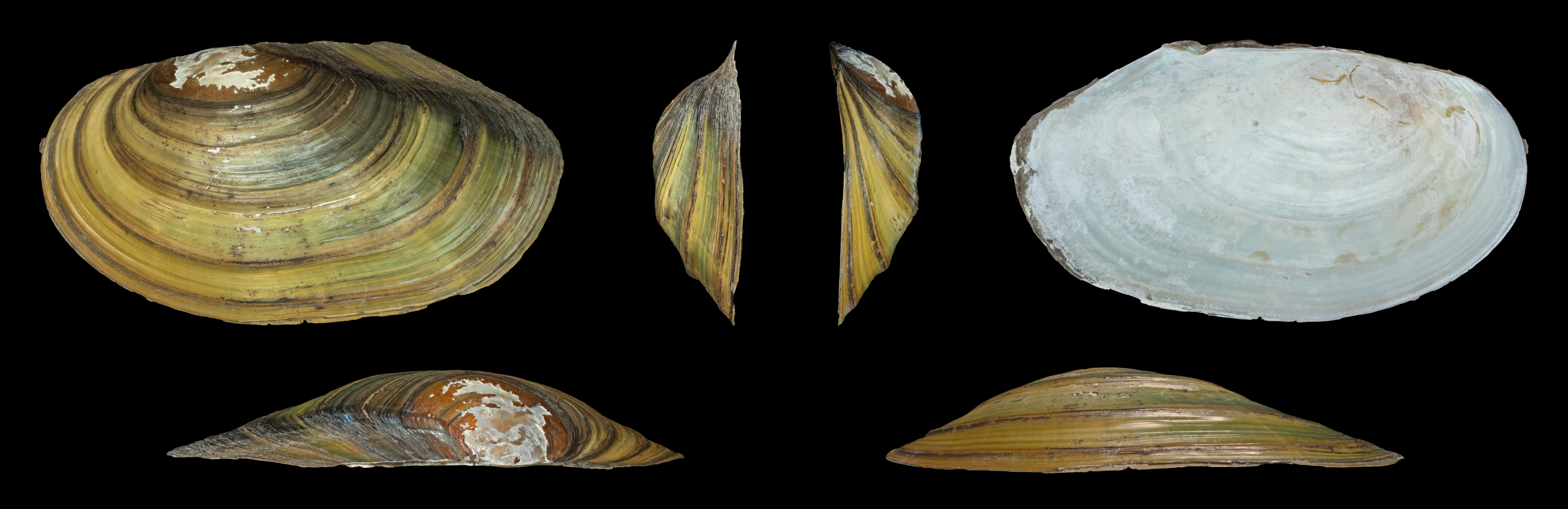
Left valve

== Distribution ==
Its native distribution is European-Siberian. The geographical distribution of this species is from the British Isles east to Siberia, and south into northern Africa.

- Croatia
- Czech Republic – in Bohemia, in Moravia, vulnerable (VU); Czech code, Decree for implementation, No. 395/1992 Sb. (and No. 175/2006 Sb.) – highly threatened species
- Germany– highly endangered (stark gefährdet); listed as a specially protected species in annex 1 in Bundesartenschutzverordnung
- The Netherlands
- Poland – endangered
- Slovakia
- Sweden – quite rare
- Great Britain and Ireland
- Italy
- Portugal
- Denmark
- Philippines

== Habitat ==
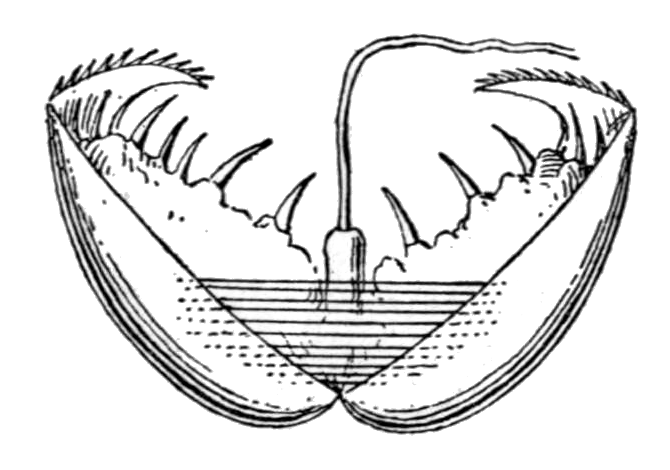
Drawing of the glochidium larva of the swan mussel

This species is found in rivers and lakes. They have a strong pungent odor and are used by carp fishermen as bait.
