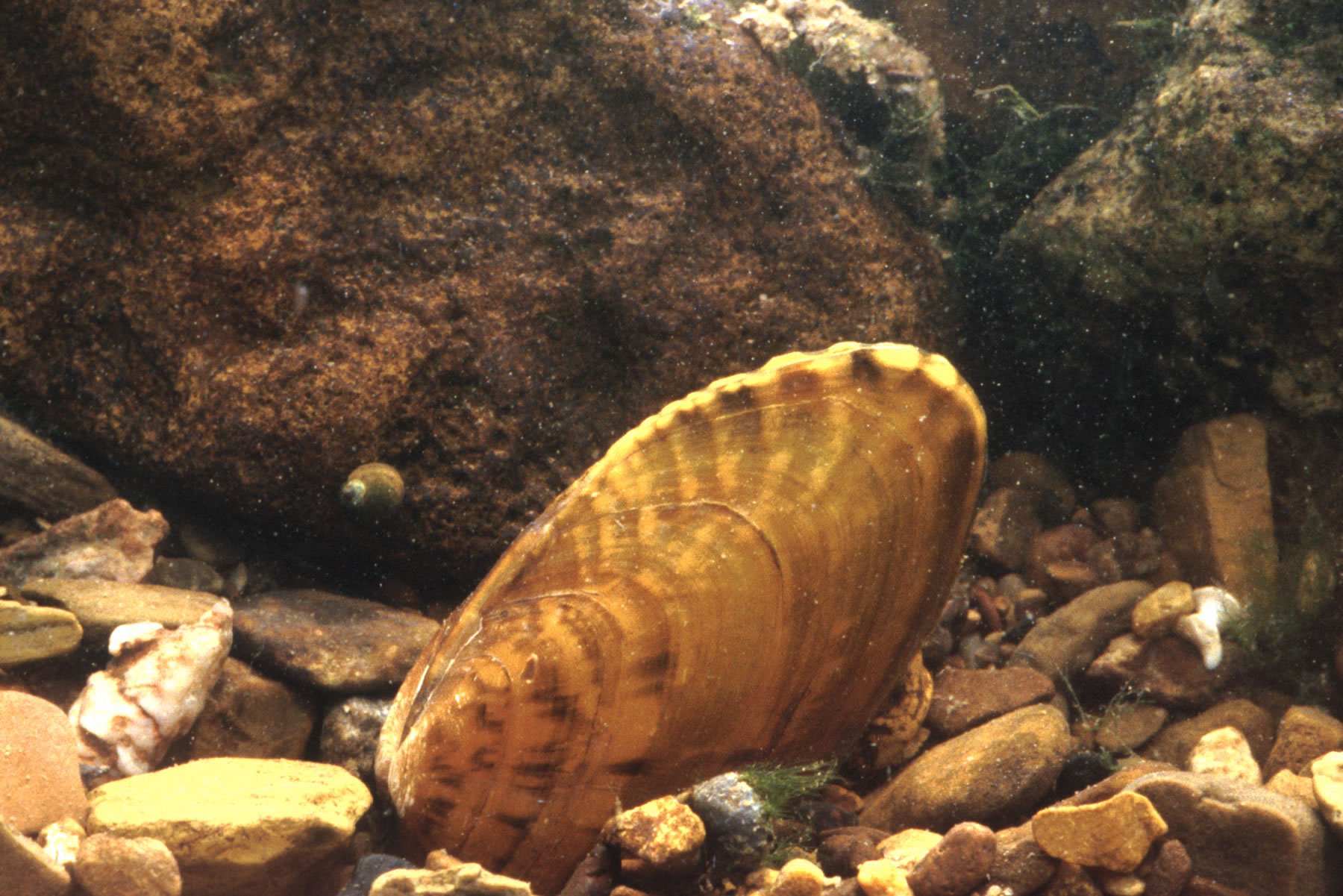

Conservation status
- Near Threatened (IUCN 2.3)

- Imperiled (NatureServe)

Scientific classification
- Kingdom: Animalia
- Phylum: Mollusca
- Class: Bivalvia
- Order: Unionida
- Family: Unionidae
- Genus: Ptychobranchus
- Species: P. subtentum

Binomial name
- Ptychobranchus subtentum (Say, 1825)

= Ptychobranchus subtentum =

Species of bivalve

Ptychobranchus subtentum, also known as the fluted kidneyshell, is a species of freshwater mussel, an aquatic bivalve mollusk in the family Unionidae, the river mussels.

This species is endemic to the drainages of the Cumberland River and the Tennessee River in the United States.

== Reproduction ==
All Unionidae are known to use the gills, fins, or skin of a host fish for nutrients during the larval glochidia stage. Ptychobranchus subtentum enclose their larvae in a membranous capsule that resembles the pupae of black flies. When a fish bites the capsule bait, the Ptychobranchus subtentum larvae are forced out through the mimic capsule's "eyes" and then attach to the gills of the host fish.

Host species of this bradytictic mussel include Etheostoma obeyense, Etheostoma rufilineatum, Etheostoma flabellare, Etheostoma caeruleum and Cottus carolinae.

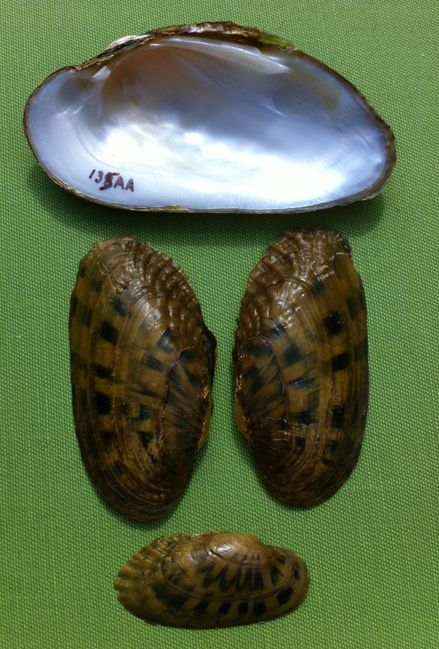
Shell morphology
