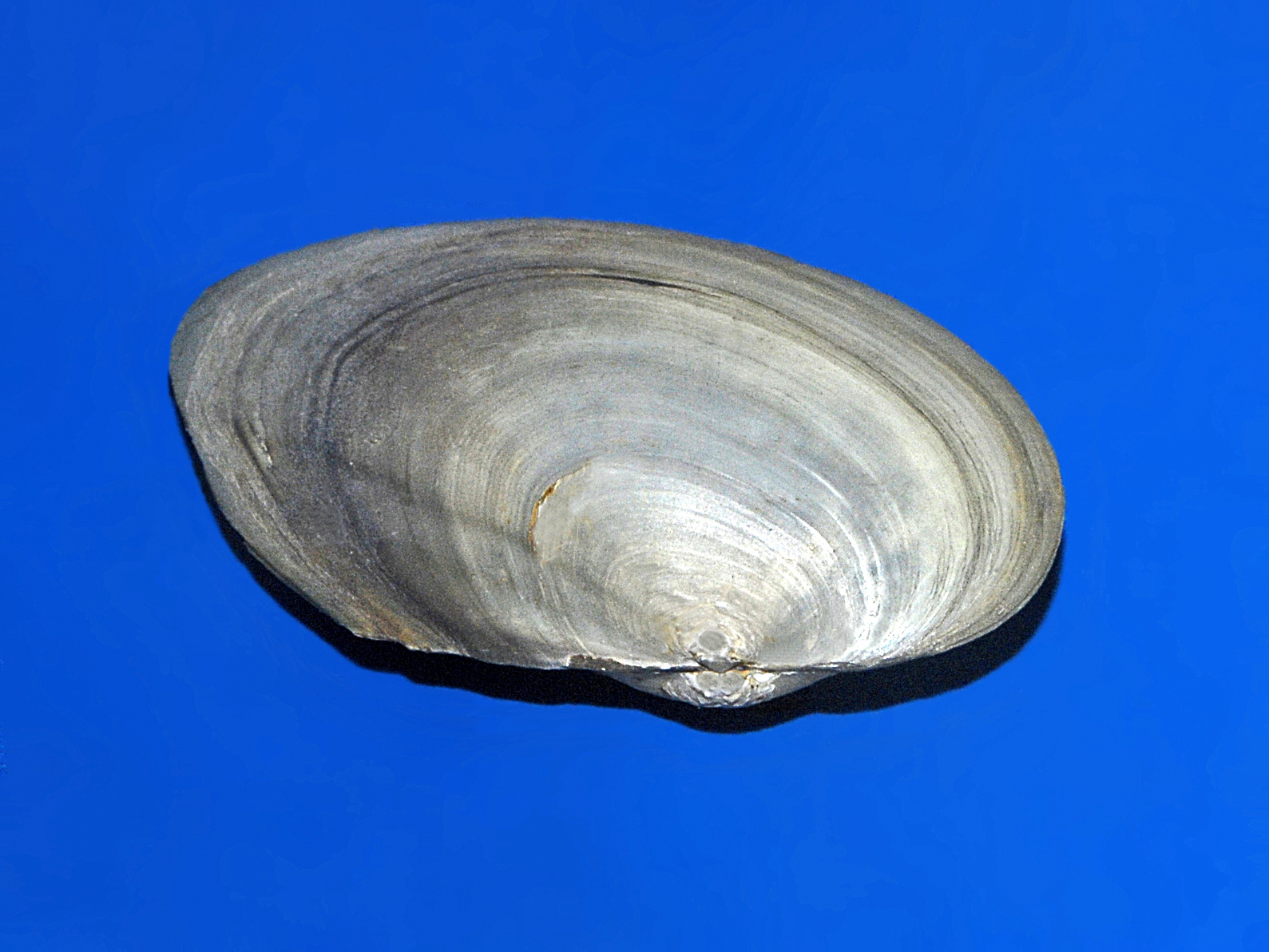
- The pearly interior of a valve of Pyganodon cataracta at the Museo Civico di Storia Naturale di Milano

Conservation status
- Least Concern (IUCN 3.1)

- Secure (NatureServe)

Scientific classification
- Kingdom: Animalia
- Phylum: Mollusca
- Class: Bivalvia
- Order: Unionida
- Family: Unionidae
- Genus: Pyganodon
- Species: P. cataracta

Binomial name
- Pyganodon cataracta (Say, 1817)

Synonyms
- List: Anodonta cataracta Say, 1817; Anodonta cataracta subsp. cataracta Say, 1817; Anodonta cataracta subsp. marginata Say, 1817; Anodonta marginata Say, 1817; Anodonta atra Rafinesque, 1820; Anodonta cuneata Rafinesque, 1820; Anodonta digonota Rafinesque, 1831; Anodonta teres Conrad, 1834; Anodonta excurvata DeKay, 1843; Anodonta virgulata Lea, 1857; Anodonta dariensis Lea, 1858; Anodonta williamsii Lea, 1862; Anodonta tryonii Lea, 1862; Anodonta doliaris Lea, 1863; Pyganodon marginata (Say, 1817)

= Pyganodon cataracta =

Species of bivalve

Pyganodon cataracta, formerly Anodonta cataracta, is a species of large freshwater mussel, an aquatic bivalve mollusc in the family Unionidae, the river mussels. Its common name is the eastern floater.

== Subspecies ==
- Pyganodon cataracta subsp. cataracta
- Pyganodon cataracta subsp. marginata

== Description ==
Pyganodon cataracta can reach a size of 10–15 centimetres (3.9–5.9 in).

== Distribution and habitat ==
This mussel is present in freshwater habitats along the Atlantic coast of North America, ranging from Alabama to some parts of Canada. It is typically found in soft-bottomed ponds, rivers and small lakes.

== Taxonomy ==
Like many other of its relatives, the eastern floater was thought to be in the genus Anodonta, but was since moved to other genera such as Pyganodon, Utterbackia, and more.
