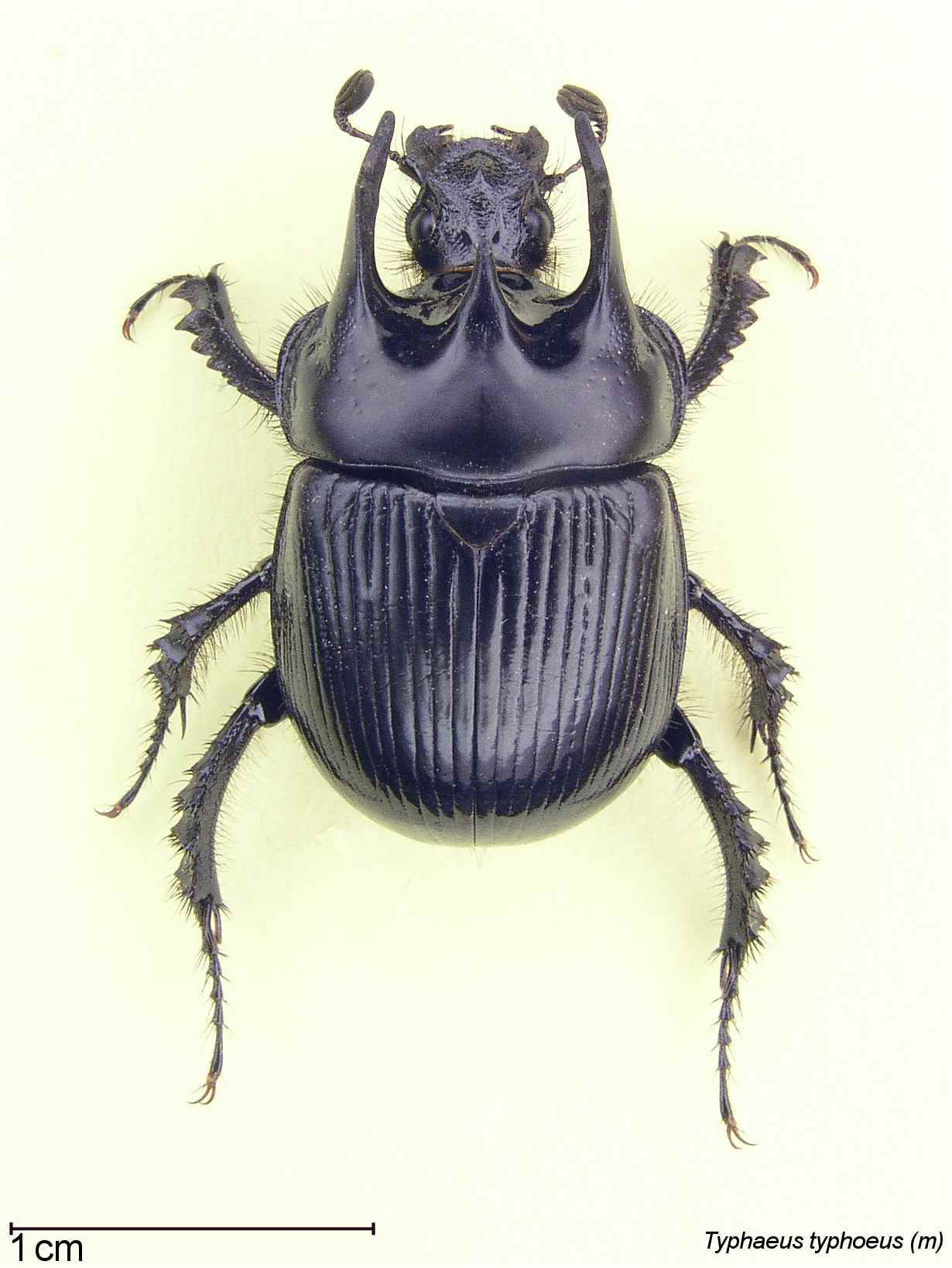
- Typhaeus typhoeus male

Scientific classification
- Kingdom: Animalia
- Phylum: Arthropoda
- Clade: Pancrustacea
- Class: Insecta
- Order: Coleoptera
- Suborder: Polyphaga
- Infraorder: Scarabaeiformia
- Family: Geotrupidae
- Genus: Typhaeus
- Species: T. typhoeus

Binomial name
- Typhaeus typhoeus (Linnaeus, 1758)

= Typhaeus typhoeus =

Species of beetle

Typhaeus typhoeus, the minotaur beetle, is a beetle in the family Geotrupidae, also referred to as earth-boring dung beetles. They are native to Europe. The beetle is named after the Typhon, a giant of Greek mythology.

== Appearance ==
Minotaur beetles grow to 15 to 24 mm in length. Their bodies are black and slightly shiny all over, stout and dome-shaped. On the elytra are longitudinal grooves with punctures. There are numerous small spines on each leg. The species clearly exhibits sexual dimorphism. Characteristic of the males are three horn-like outgrowths on the pronotum. The two outer protrusions are long, while the one in the middle is short. The females instead have a few pointed humps here.

== Occurrence ==
The minotaur beetle is found in certain regions of Europe and North Africa. It lives in sandy, sunny areas of pine forests or in sandy moorland. They are rare elsewhere. In Germany, the minotaur beetle is an "especially protected" species and is protected under the Bundesartenschutzverordnung (BArtSchV).

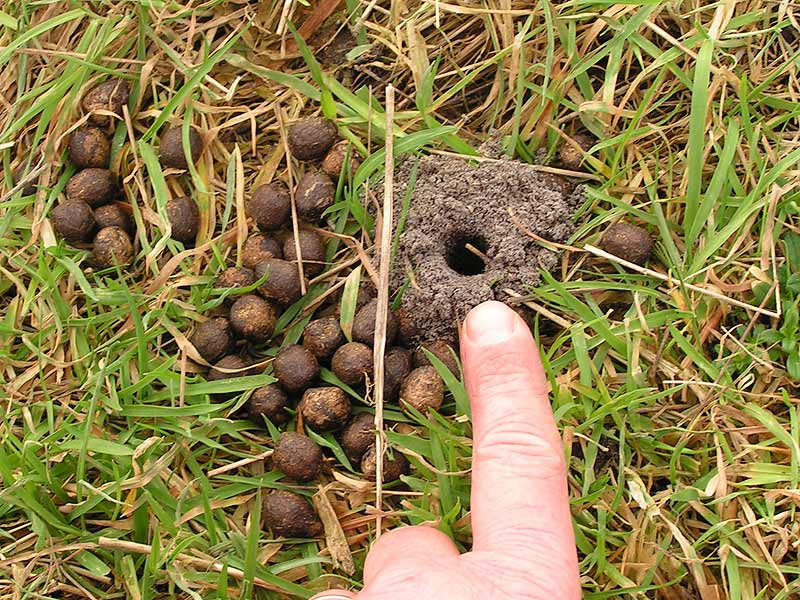
brood chamber entrance

== Literature ==
- Karl Wilhelm Harde, František Severa, Edwin Möhn: Der Kosmos Käferführer: Die mitteleuropäischen Käfer. Franckh-Kosmos Verlags-GmbH & Co, Stuttgart 2000, ISBN 3-440-06959-1
