= Ptychobranchus occidentalis =

Conservation status
- Near Threatened (IUCN 2.3)

- Vulnerable (NatureServe)

Scientific classification
- Kingdom: Animalia
- Phylum: Mollusca
- Class: Bivalvia
- Order: Unionida
- Family: Unionidae
- Genus: Ptychobranchus
- Species: P. occidentalis

Binomial name
- Ptychobranchus occidentalis (Conrad, 1836)

Species of bivalve

Ptychobranchus occidentalis is a species of freshwater mussel in the family Unionidae, the river mussels. It is endemic to the United States, where it is known from Arkansas, Kansas, Louisiana, Missouri, and Oklahoma. Its common name is Ouachita kidneyshell.

This mussel packages its larvae, or glochidia, in a membranous conglutinate which resembles a small prey item. When a fish comes to investigate this lure, the glochidia attach to its gills and use it as a host during their development.
