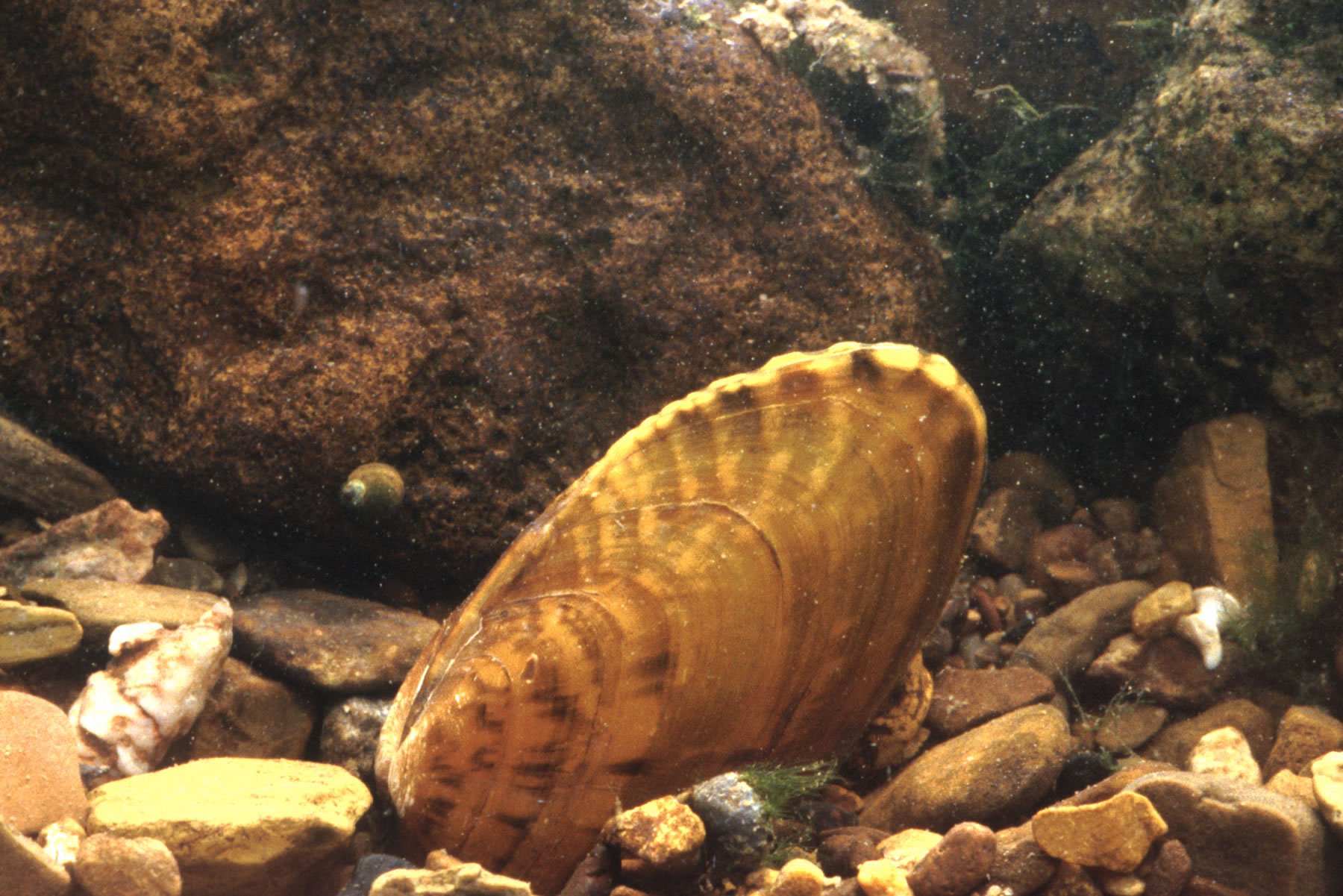
- Ptychobranchus subtentum

Scientific classification
- Domain: Eukaryota
- Kingdom: Animalia
- Phylum: Mollusca
- Class: Bivalvia
- Order: Unionida
- Family: Unionidae
- Tribe: Lampsilini
- Genus: Ptychobranchus; Simpson, 1900

= Ptychobranchus =

Genus of bivalves

Ptychobranchus is a genus of freshwater mussels in the family Unionidae. They are endemic to North America, and are mainly found in the Midwest and southeastern United States as well as Ontario, Canada. Several members of the genus are considered endangered species.

The genus is characterized by folded gills of the female that accommodate larvae packages, thus the meaning of the genus name, "folded gills". She produces one conglutinate in each demibranch of the gills. Members of this genus are long-term brooders and hold their eggs over winter.

Species of this genus package their larvae, known as glochidia, in conglutinates that resemble prey items such as aquatic insects, fish fry, or fish eggs. The lures are intended to attract fish that the glochidia can use as hosts during development. When squeezed, the conglutinate will rupture, allowing the larvae to parasitically attach to the fish.

Species include:

- Ptychobranchus fasciolaris – kidneyshell
- Ptychobranchus foremanianus – rayed kidneyshell
- Ptychobranchus greenii – triangular kidneyshell
- Ptychobranchus jonesi – southern kidneyshell
- Ptychobranchus occidentalis – Ouachita kidneyshell
- Ptychobranchus subtentum – fluted kidneyshell
