= Anodonta pseudodopsis =

Conservation status
- Endangered (IUCN 3.1)

Scientific classification
- Kingdom: Animalia
- Phylum: Mollusca
- Class: Bivalvia
- Order: Unionida
- Family: Unionidae
- Genus: Anodonta
- Species: A. pseudodopsis

Binomial name
- Anodonta pseudodopsis Locard, 1883

Synonyms
- Gabillotia pseudodopsis

Species of bivalve

Anodonta pseudodopsis is a species of medium-sized freshwater mussel, an aquatic bivalve mollusc in the family Unionidae, the river mussels. It is now no longer accepted as a species, instead, being synonymous with A. anatina.

== Distribution ==
This species is found only within the basin of the Orontes River, in Syria, Turkey, and possibly Lebanon. It was last seen in Gölbaşı Lake. Its survival is threatened by water extraction, pollution, wetland draining, and the construction of dams.
