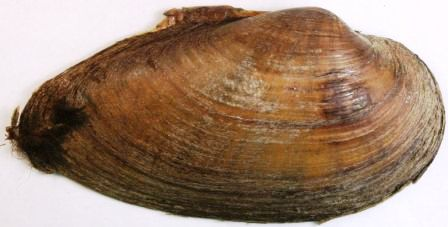

Conservation status
- Least Concern (IUCN 3.1)

Scientific classification
- Kingdom: Animalia
- Phylum: Mollusca
- Class: Bivalvia
- Order: Unionida
- Family: Unionidae
- Genus: Unio
- Species: U. tumidus

Binomial name
- Unio tumidus Philipsson in Retzius, 1788
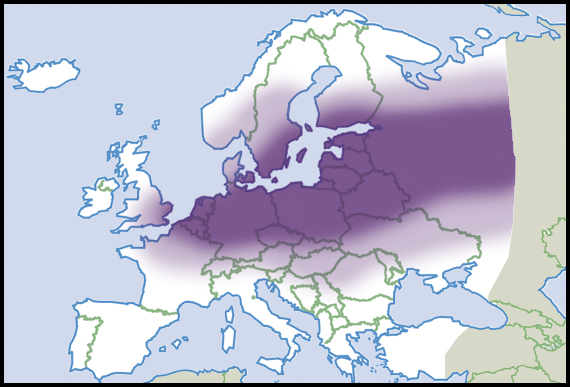
- Distribution of Unio tumidus in Europe.

= Unio tumidus =

Swollen river mussel

Species of bivalve

Unio tumidus, the swollen river mussel, is a species of freshwater mussel, an aquatic bivalve mollusc in the family Unionidae, the river mussels.

Subspecies

- † Unio tumidus ludwigi Wenz, 1922

== Synonyms ==
- Mya depressa Donovan, 1801 (a junior synonym)
- Mysca solida W. Turton, 1822 junior subjective synonym
- Unio (Tumidusiana) tumidus Philipsson, 1788 ·
- Unio (Unio) conus Spengler, 1793 ·
- Unio (Unio) muelleri Rossmässler, 1838 (a junior synonym)
- Unio (Unio) tumidus Philipsson, 1788 ·
- Unio conus Spengler, 1793 ·
- Unio gerstfeldtianus Clessin, 1880 · (a junior synonym)
- Unio inflata Hecart, 1833 (unavailable; a junior homonym of Unio inflatus Studer, 1820)
- Unio lauterborni F. Haas, 1909 (a junior synonym)
- Unio limosus var. maxima Mörch, 1864 (a junior synonym)
- Unio muelleri Rossmässler, 1838 ·
- Unio ovalis (Montagu, 1803) ·
- Unio rhenanus Kobelt, 1886 (a junior synonym)
- Unio tumidus gerstfeldtianus Clessin, 1880 (a junior synonym)
- Unio tumidus ilekensis Kobelt, 1911 (a junior synonym)
- Unio tumidus var. bashkiricus Zhadin, 1938 (a junior synonym)
- Unio tumidus var. borysthenensis Kobelt, 1880 (a junior synonym)
- Unio tumidus var. corrosus Zelebor, 1851 (a junior synonym)
- Unio tumidus var. falcatulus Drouët, 1881 (a junior synonym)
- Unio tumidus var. fridmani Zhadin, 1938 (a junior synonym)
- Unio tumidus var. heckingi Colbeau, 1868 (a junior synonym)
- Unio tumidus var. kobeltianus Zhadin, 1938 ·
- Unio tumidus var. limicola Mörch, 1864 (a junior synonym)
- Unio tumidus var. moltschanovi Zhadin, 1938 (a junior synonym)
- Unio tumidus var. okae Kobelt, 1911 (invalid; junior homonym of Unio...)
- Unio tumidus var. picta Mörch, 1864 ·
- Unio tumidus var. rohrmanni Kobelt, 1880 (a junior synonym)
- Unio tumidus var. saccatus Rossmässler, 1858 (a junior synonym)

== Distribution ==
Its native distribution is European.

- Croatia
- Czech Republic - in Bohemia, in Moravia, vulnerable (VU)
- Germany
  - Germany - high endangered (Stark gefährdet)
  - Germany - Listed as a specially protected species in annex 1 in Bundesartenschutzverordnung.
- Latvia
- Lithuania - vulnerable
- Netherlands
- Poland
- Slovakia
- Sweden
- British Isles - in England
