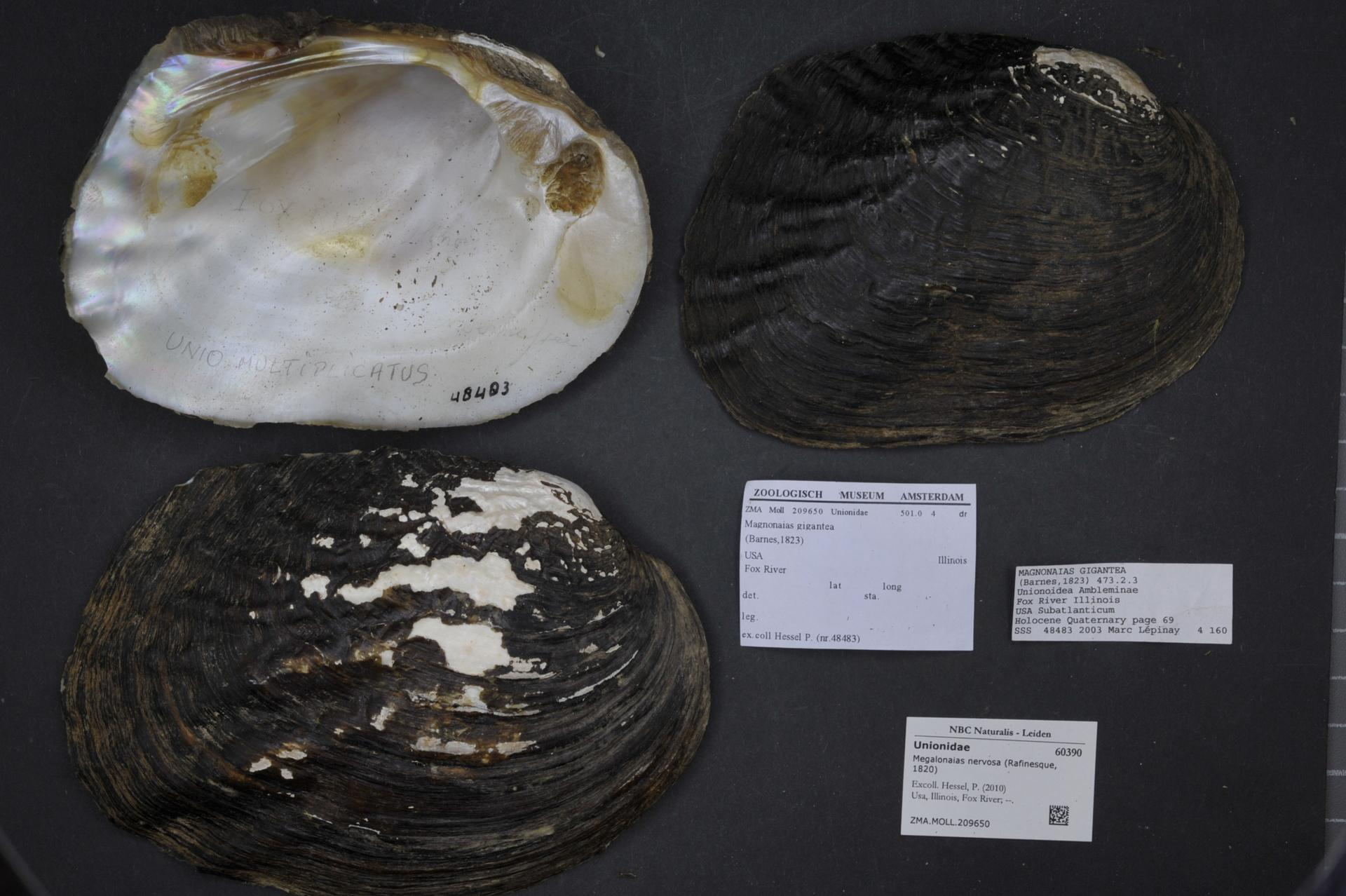
- Museum specimen

Conservation status
- Least Concern (IUCN 3.1)

- Secure (NatureServe)

Scientific classification
- Kingdom: Animalia
- Phylum: Mollusca
- Class: Bivalvia
- Order: Unionida
- Family: Unionidae
- Genus: Megalonaias
- Species: M. nervosa

Binomial name
- Megalonaias nervosa (Rafinesque, 1820)

= Megalonaias nervosa =

Species of bivalve

Megalonaias nervosa, the washboard, is a freshwater mussel species in the family Unionidae.

== Description ==
The shell is divided into two valves that are hinged. Shell is thick and rectangular in shape and can be compressed or inflated; umbos do not extend above the hinge line (Cicerello, R. and Schuster, G. 2003). The cardinal teeth are large and serrated, while the lateral teeth are long and curved. Shell color ranges from dark brown to black and is covered with small bumps and has fluted ridges: nacre is white to gray color.

== Life cycle ==
Megalonaias nervosa mussels are sexually mature around 8 years of age, they are late tachytictic breeders. From July to October the males are mature, while they female contain eggs from August through October. Megalonaias nervosa males release sperm and the females collect the sperm through the incurrent siphon. The eggs are fertilized internally. Megalonaias nervosa has a parasitic larva stage called glochidia, the mussel uses a lure to attract fish and then releases the glochidia when the fish is close enough. The glochidia latch onto the gills or fins of the fish and remain there feeding of the blood of the fish until the glochidia reach the juvenile stage. Known host species for Megalonaias nervosa include longnose gar, largemouth bass, yellow perch, longear sunfish, bluegill, slender-head darter, and log perch (O'Dee, S. and Watters, T. 1998). Parent mussel provides no care once the glochidia are released. Megalonaias nervosa are filter feeders, waste is released through the excurrent siphon. They are sedentary creatures and are anchored to the substrate or buried in the substrate. Studies had shown water temperature plays a role in reproduction, if the water temperature is too low, the mussels will not reproduce.

== Habitat ==
Megalonaias nervosa can be found in small or larger rivers and in a variety of substrate including mud, sand, or gravel. Although Megalonaias nervosa is of least conservation concern, mussels have suffered from habitat loss caused by pollution, invasive species and impoundment of water. Megalonaias nervosa reproduction rate has decreased in some areas due to low water temperature.

== Range ==
Megalonaias nervosa can be found in the Mississippi drainage, in the Gulf drainage from Ochlockonee River system west of the Rio Grande, and extends into northeastern Mexico. Does not occur in Canada.

Megalonaias nervosa is similar to Amblema plicata and Arcidens confragosus.
