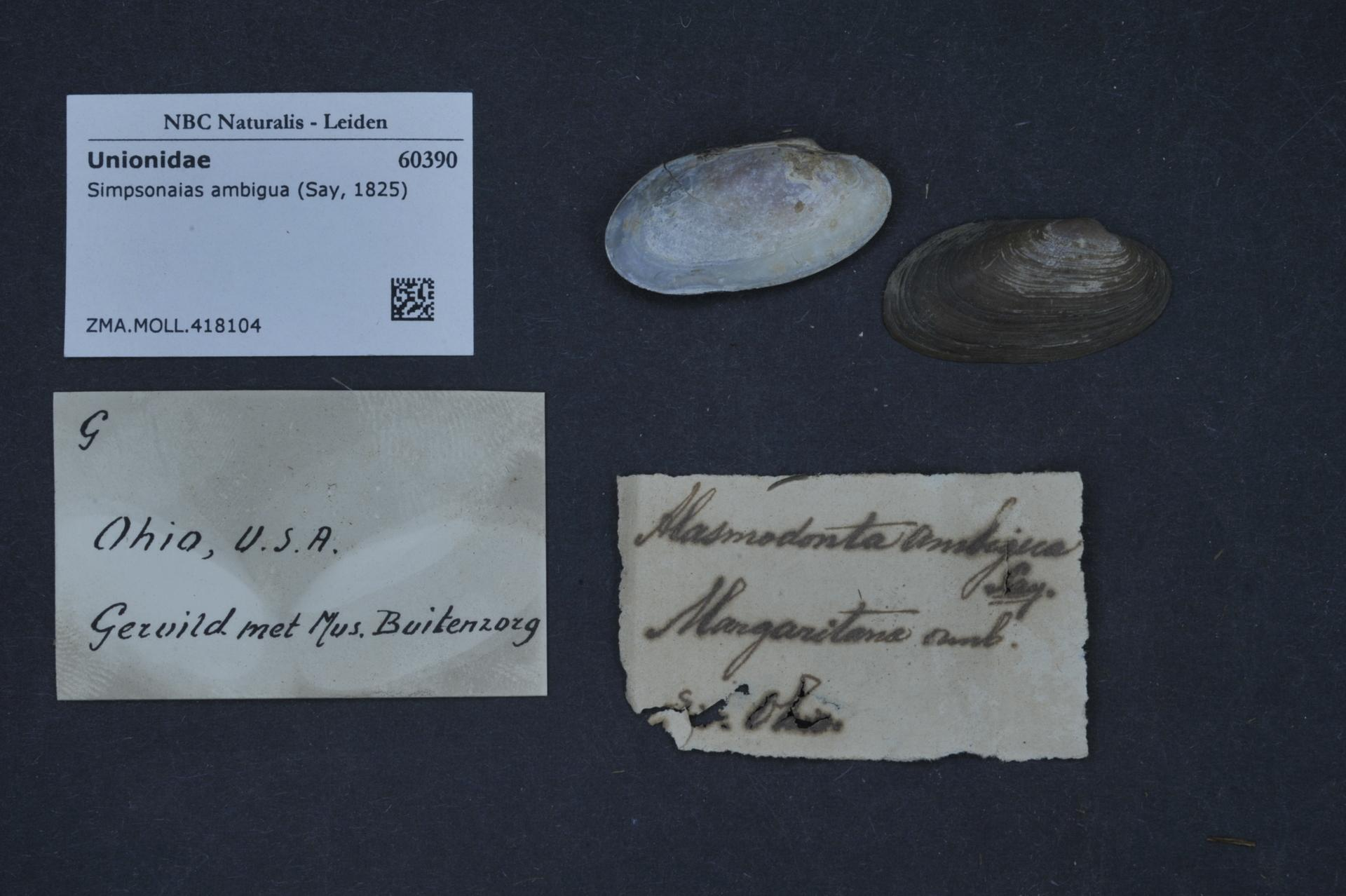

Conservation status
- Vulnerable (IUCN 3.1)

- Critically Imperiled (NatureServe)

Scientific classification
- Kingdom: Animalia
- Phylum: Mollusca
- Class: Bivalvia
- Order: Unionida
- Family: Unionidae
- Tribe: Anodontini
- Genus: Simpsonaias; Frierson, 1914
- Species: S. ambigua

Binomial name
- Simpsonaias ambigua (Say, 1825)

Synonyms
- Alasmodonta ambigua Say, 1825; Hemilastena ambigua (Say, 1825); Simpsoniconcha ambigua (Say, 1825); Unio hildrethianus Lea, 1834; Margarita (Unio) hildrethianus (Lea, 1834); Margaron (Margaritana) hildrethiana (Lea, 1834)

= Salamander mussel =

Species of bivalve

Simpsonaias ambigua, the salamander mussel or mudpuppy mussel, is a species of bivalve in the family Unionidae. It is unique among freshwater mussels in using mudpuppies as its glochidial host.

== Ecology ==
Salamander mussels are a freshwater mussel species notable for their obligate parasitic relationship with the mudpuppy salamander (Necturus maculosus). Its larvae (glochidia) attach to the gills of mudpuppies, where they receive necessary nutrients and dispersal, eventually metamorphosing before dropping off into suitable benthic substrate. The species tends to occur in low-density populations, often associated with mudpuppy parameters such as population size and microhabitats that support them (e.g., refugia such as flat rocks and crevices). Adult S. ambigua typically inhabit clean, well-oxygenated, fine-sand or silt substrates in medium- to large-sized rivers with stable flow.

Like many freshwater mussels, S. ambigua contributes to ecosystem processes such as nutrient cycling and substrate stabilization. By filtering suspended particles, individuals improve water clarity and support aquatic food webs.

== Distribution ==
The historical range of the salamander mussel includes the Mississippi, Ohio, and Great Lakes drainages, spanning 25 U.S. states and parts of southern Ontario, Canada. Adult S. ambigua typically inhabit clean, well-oxygenated, fine-sand or silt substrates in medium- to large-sized rivers with stable flow. It has been documented in rivers such as the Wabash, Maumee, Ohio, and Tennessee, though it is now considered rare or extirpated from much of its former range.

Recent records show persistence in several areas once thought to have lost populations. For example, S. ambigua was rediscovered in Illinois using environmental DNA (eDNA) analysis, and continues to occupy isolated sites in southern Ontario, where populations exhibit small size structure and low density but evidence of continued reproduction. A 2020 record from the Harpeth River in Tennessee extended the known distribution within the lower Cumberland system.

== Conservation ==
The Salamander Mussel is considered rare throughout its range, listed as a Special Concern in most U.S. states and Threatened in Canada. Recovery is limited by the species’ dependence on both pristine benthic habitats and healthy populations of its mudpuppy salamander host. Modern molecular and habitat-based tools are increasingly used to aid in the detection and management of the species. Environmental DNA (eDNA) surveys have confirmed its persistence in regions where it was previously thought extirpated, including Illinois and Ontario. Research continues to refine methods for identifying suitable habitats and assessing the ecological conditions that support viable populations.

== Threats ==
Major threats to the Salamander Mussel include habitat degradation, pollution, and declines in its amphibian host. Channelization, sedimentation, and dam construction have reduced suitable substrates and altered natural flow regimes, limiting available habitat. Runoff from agricultural and industrial activities further degrades water quality, negatively affecting both the mussel and the mudpuppy host. Declines in mudpuppy populations, linked to pollution and habitat loss, directly limit mussel reproduction and dispersal. Surviving mussel populations are often small and isolated, leaving them vulnerable to stochastic events and local extirpation.
