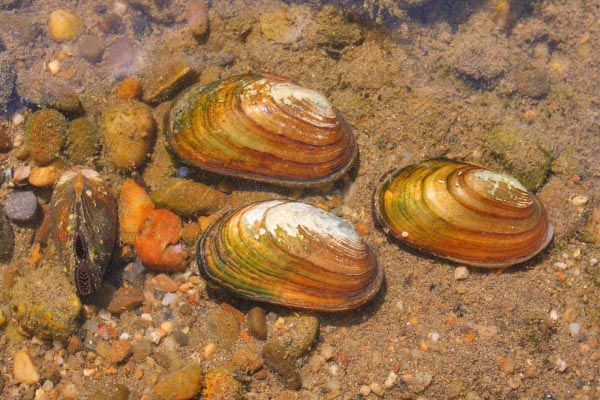
- Unio crassus

Scientific classification
- Domain: Eukaryota
- Kingdom: Animalia
- Phylum: Mollusca
- Class: Bivalvia
- Order: Unionida
- Family: Unionidae
- Subfamily: Unioninae; Rafinesque, 1820

Genera
- See text

= Unioninae =

Subfamily of freshwater mussels

Unioninae is a subfamily of freshwater mussels in the family Unionidae. This superfamily has a wide distribution, being found throughout Eurasia, North America (including Central America) and Africa.

== Systematics ==
The following classification is based on MolluscaBase and the MUSSEL Project database:

- Tribe Anodontini Rafinesque, 1820
  - Genus Alasmidonta Say, 1818
  - Genus Anodonta Lamarck, 1799
  - Genus Anodontoides C. T. Simpson, 1898
  - Genus Arcidens C. T. Simpson, 1900
  - Genus †Cyclanodonta Starobogatov, 1970
  - Genus Lasmigona Rafinesque, 1831
  - Genus †Modelliella Starobogatov, 1970
  - Genus Pegias C. T. Simpson, 1900
  - Genus Pseudanodonta Bourguignat, 1877
  - Genus Pseudodontoideus Frierson, 1927
  - Genus Pyganodon Crosse & P. Fischer, 1894
  - Genus †Sichuanoconcha X.-Z. Liu, 1984
  - Genus Simpsonaias Frierson, 1914
  - Genus Simpsonella Cockerell, 1903
  - Genus Strophitus Rafinesque, 1820
  - Genus Utterbackia F. C. Baker, 1927
  - Genus Utterbackiana Frierson, 1927
- Tribe Cristariini Lopes-Lima, Bogan & Froufe, 2017
  - Genus Amuranodonta Moskvicheva, 1973
  - Genus Anemina F. Haas, 1969
  - Genus Beringiana Starobogatov in Zatravkin, 1983
  - Genus Buldowskia Moskvicheva, 1973
  - Genus Cristaria Schumacher, 1817
  - Genus Pletholophus C. T. Simpson, 1900
  - Genus Sinanodonta Modell, 1945
- Tribe Lanceolariini Froufe, Lopes-Lima & Bogan, 2017
  - Genus Lanceolaria Conrad, 1853
- Tribe Lepidodesmini Huang & Wu in Huang et al. 2019
  - Genus Lepidodesma C. T. Simpson, 1896
- Tribe Middendorffinaiini Lopes-Lima, Bolotov & Bogan, 2020
  - Genus Middendorffinaia Moskvicheva & Starobogatov, 1973
- Tribe Nodulariini Starobogatov & Zatravkin, 1987
  - Genus Cuneopsis C. T. Simpson, 1900
  - Genus Inversiunio Habe, 1991
  - Genus Nodularia Conrad, 1853
  - Genus Pseudocuneopsis X. Huang, Y. Dai, Z. Chen & X. Wu, 2022
  - Genus Schistodesmus C. T. Simpson, 1900
  - Genus Tchangsinaia Starobogatov, 1970
- Tribe Unionini Rafinesque, 1820
  - Genus Aculamprotula X.-P. Wu, Y.-L. Liang, H.-Z. Wang & S. Ouyang, 1999
  - Genus Acuticosta C. T. Simpson, 1900
  - Genus †Betekeia Starobogatov, 1970
  - Genus Diaurora Cockerell, 1903
  - Genus †Heterunio Lindholm, 1932
  - Genus †Modellinaia Starobogatov, 1970
  - Genus †Palindonaia Modell, 1950
  - Genus †Pristinunio Starobogatov, 1970
  - Genus Protunio P. Haas, 1913
  - Genus Pseudobaphia C. T. Simpson, 1900
  - Genus Rhombuniopsis F. Haas, 1920
  - Genus †Rumanunio Starobogatov, 1970
  - Genus †Sculptunio Lindholm, 1932
  - Genus †Sibirunio Starobogatov, 1970
  - Genus †Tuberunio Lindholm, 1932
  - Genus Unio Philipsson, 1788

The MUSSEL Project database and ITIS instead only divide the subfamily into five tribes, with Anodontini having three subtribes.
