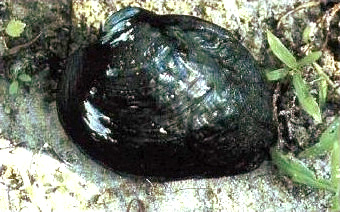
- A live individual of Arcidens wheeleri

Conservation status
- Endangered (IUCN 3.1)

- Critically Imperiled (NatureServe)

Scientific classification
- Kingdom: Animalia
- Phylum: Mollusca
- Class: Bivalvia
- Order: Unionida
- Family: Unionidae
- Genus: Arcidens
- Species: A. wheeleri

Binomial name
- Arcidens wheeleri Ortmann & Walker, 1912

Synonyms
- Arkansia wheeleri

= Arcidens wheeleri =

Ouachita rock pocketbook

Species of bivalves

Arcidens wheeleri is a species of freshwater mussels in the family Unionidae, the river mussels. Its common names are the Ouachita rock pocketbook and Wheeler's pearly mussel. The former monotypic genus of Arkansia was named for the state of Arkansas, where the mussel was first discovered.

This is a federally listed endangered species of the United States.

== Distribution ==
This species is native to Arkansas, Oklahoma, and Texas in the United States, which have only four or five small, isolated populations. Of the remaining populations, only the one located in the Kiamichi River in Oklahoma is viable.

== Description ==
This mussel is not sexually dimorphic; the sexes appear the same. The shell is somewhat rounded or oval, up to 112 millimetres (4.4 in) long by 60 millimetres (2.4 in) wide by 87 millimetres (3.4 in) high. The shell is brown or black, lustrous and iridescent. The nacre is part pink and part white or bluish.
