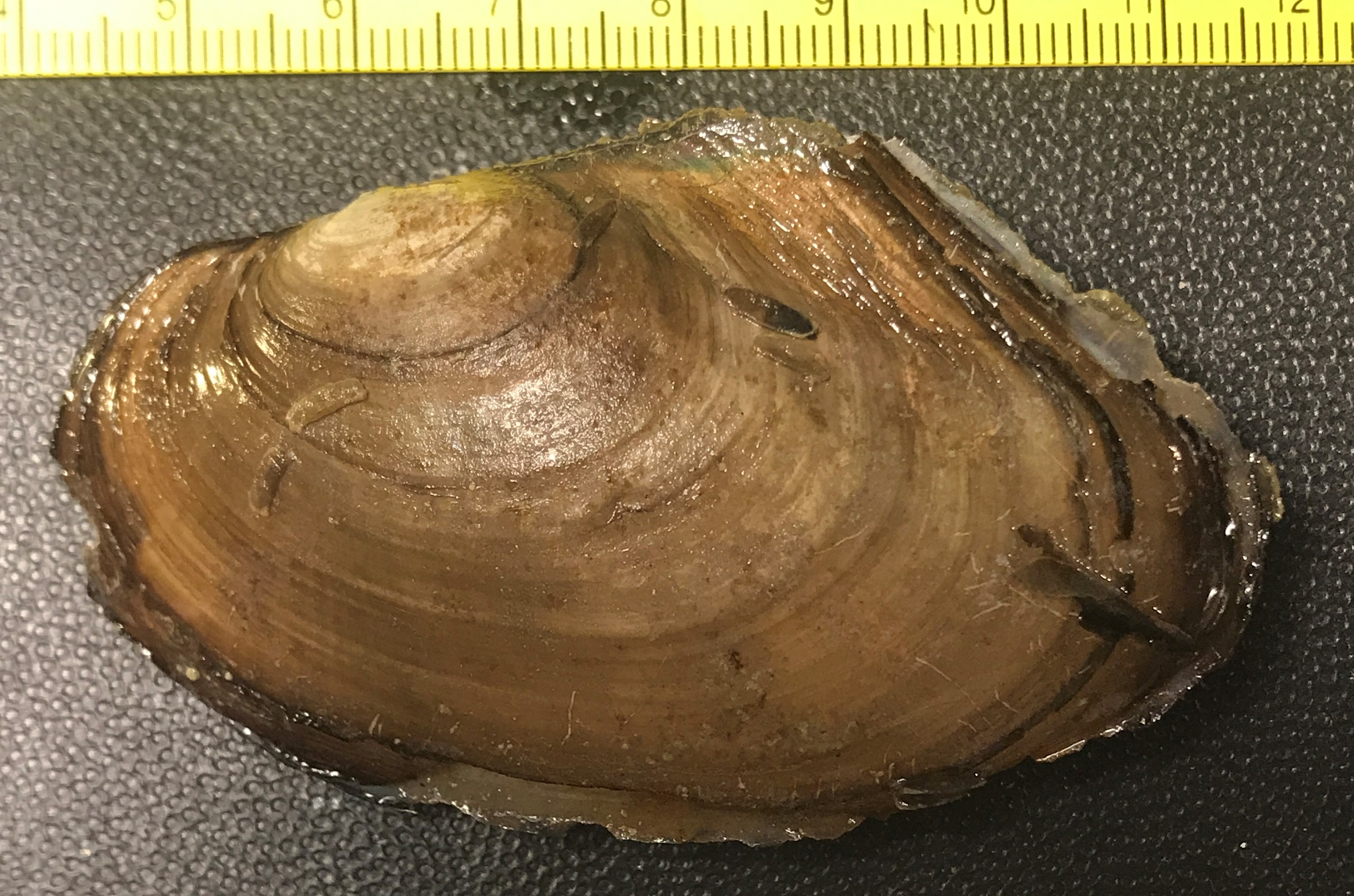

Conservation status
- Vulnerable (IUCN 3.1)

- Imperiled (NatureServe)

Scientific classification
- Kingdom: Animalia
- Phylum: Mollusca
- Class: Bivalvia
- Order: Unionida
- Family: Unionidae
- Genus: Anodonta
- Species: A. nuttalliana

Binomial name
- Anodonta nuttalliana Lea 1838

Synonyms
- Anodonta idahoensis (Hemphill, 1891); Anodonta marginata wahlamatensis I. Lea, 1838; Anodonta nuttaliana (misspelling); Anodonta nuttalliana idahoensis Hemphill, 1891; Anodonta rotundovata Trask, 1855; Anodonta triangularis Trask, 1855; Anodonta wahlamatensis I. Lea, 1838; Anodonta wahlametensis I. Lea, 1838; Margarita (Anodonta) nuttalliana (I. Lea, 1838); Margarita (Anodonta) wahlamatensis (I. Lea, 1838); Margaron (Anodonta) nuttalliana (I. Lea, 1838); Margaron (Anodonta) wahlamatensis (I. Lea, 1838)

= Winged floater =

Species of bivalve

The winged floater (Anodonta nuttalliana) is a species of freshwater mussel, an aquatic bivalve mollusk.

== Taxonomy ==
The species was first described in 1838 by Isaac Lea, along with two similar-looking shells from one location in the lower Willamette River: A. oregonensis (Oregon floater) and A. wahlamatensis (Willamette floater). The latter is currently treated as synonymous with A. nuttalliana.

== Description ==
The shell of the winged floater is quite thin, and elliptical or ovate, with the back dorsal showing the prominent "wing" shape. The nacre has white or blue-tinged tone. Individuals may reach a size of up to 4.25 inches (10.8 cm).

== Distribution and habitat ==
The winged floater lives buried in the sandy or muddy bottom of lakes and rivers, most frequently at low elevations. The species occurs in California, Oregon, Washington, and the southern parts of British Columbia. Historical records from Utah are of uncertain status.
