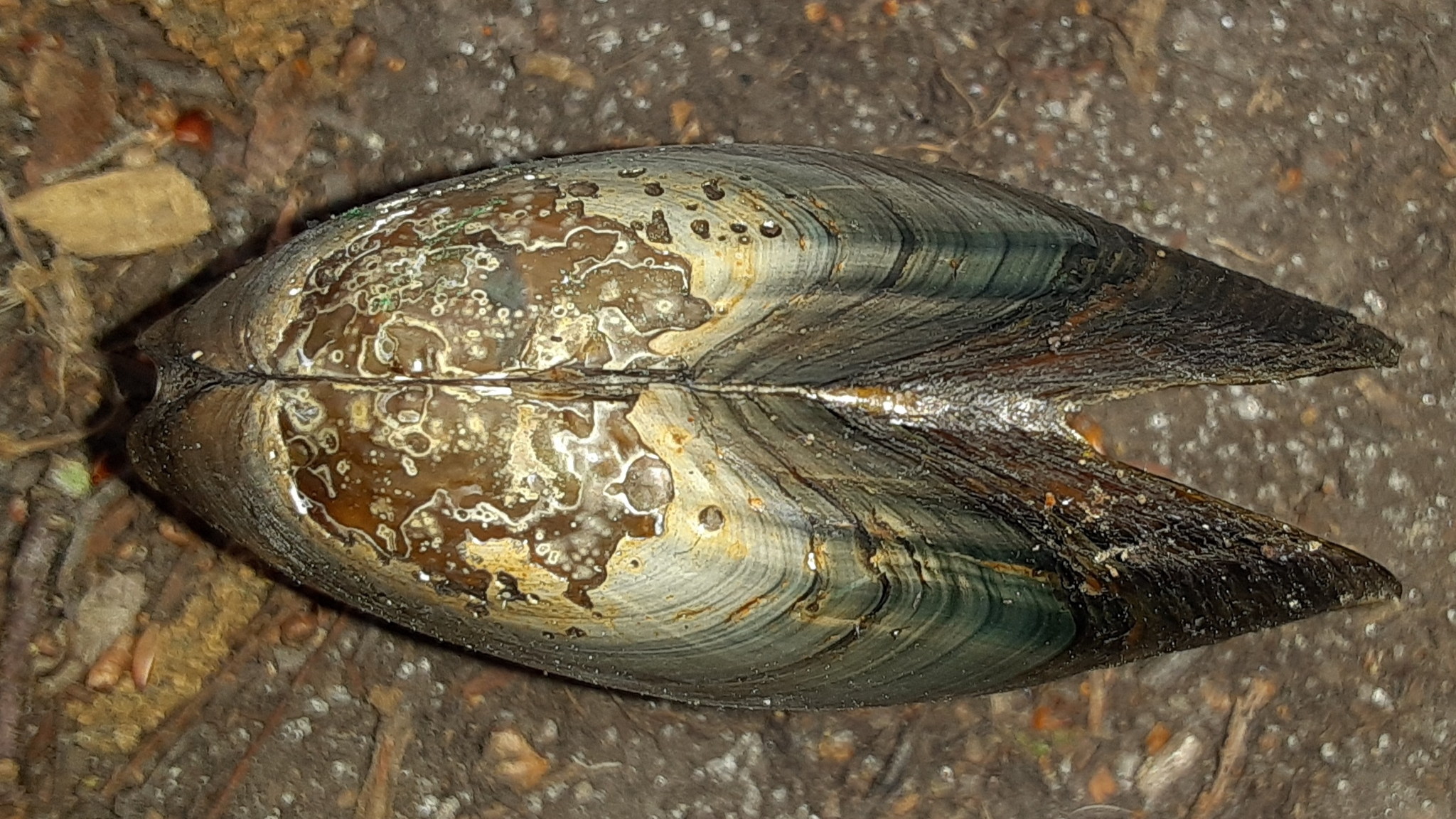

Conservation status
- Least Concern (IUCN 3.1)

- Secure (NatureServe)

Scientific classification
- Kingdom: Animalia
- Phylum: Mollusca
- Class: Bivalvia
- Order: Unionida
- Family: Unionidae
- Genus: Utterbackia
- Species: U. imbecillis

Binomial name
- Utterbackia imbecillis (Say, 1829)

Synonyms
- Anodon horda Gould, 1855; Anodonta (Lastena) ohiensis horda (Gould, 1855); Anodonta (Utterbackia) imbecilis (Say, 1829); Anodonta henryana Lea, 1860; Anodonta henryiana Lea, 1857; Anodonta imbecillis Say, 1829; Anodonta incerta Lea, 1834; Anodonta phalena De Gregorio, 1914; Margarita (Anodonta) incerta (Lea, 1834); Margaron (Anodonta) henryana (Lea, 1857); Margaron (Anodonta) imbecillis (Say, 1829); Utterbackia henryana (Lea, 1857); Utterbackia imbecilis (Say, 1829); Utterbackia imbecillis var. fusca Baker, 1927

= Utterbackia imbecillis =

Species of bivalve

Utterbackia imbecillis, commonly known as the paper pondshell, papershell, or paper floater, is a species of freshwater mussel in the family Unionidae. Native to North America, it is a widespread species distributed in much of the eastern United States as well as Ontario and Quebec in Canada and Tamaulipas in Mexico.

== Taxonomy and history ==
This species was described by Thomas Say in 1829 as Anodonta imbecillis, based on a type specimen from the Wabash River in New Harmony, Indiana. This type specimen, and most of Say's other material, is believed to be lost, however, a neotype designated by Fritz Haas in 1930 is held in the collection of the Naturmuseum Senckenberg in Germany. The specific epithet imbecillis is derived from the Latin word imbecillus, meaning "feeble" or "weak", in reference to the unusually thin and fragile shell of this species.

Frank Collins Baker erected the genus Utterbackia for this species in 1927, combining the binomial as Utterbackia imbecillis. Baker noted that, unlike mussels in the genus Anodonta, U. imbecillis is hermaphroditic, has unusually flat umbones, and is not an obligate parasite in the glochidia stage.

In English, this species is commonly known as the paper pondshell, papershell, or paper floater, while in French it is commonly known as Utterbackie papyracée.

== Description ==
It is characterized by its unusually thin shell, from which it derives its species name, meaning "fragile".

== Distribution and habitat ==
Utterbackia imbecillis has a large range across eastern North America, including the provinces of Quebec and Ontario in Canada and the states of Alabama, Arkansas, Florida, Georgia, Illinois, Indiana, Iowa, Kansas, Kentucky, Louisiana, Maryland, Michigan, Minnesota, Mississippi, Missouri, Nebraska, New Mexico, New York, North Carolina, Ohio, Oklahoma, Pennsylvania, South Carolina, South Dakota, Tennessee, Texas, Virginia, West Virginia, and Wisconsin and the District of Columbia in the United States. The southernmost point of its range extends to the state of Tamaulipas in northeastern Mexico. It is a freshwater species that inhabits both natural and artificial lakes, ponds, creeks, rivers, and reservoirs, preferring a sandy or muddy substrate.
