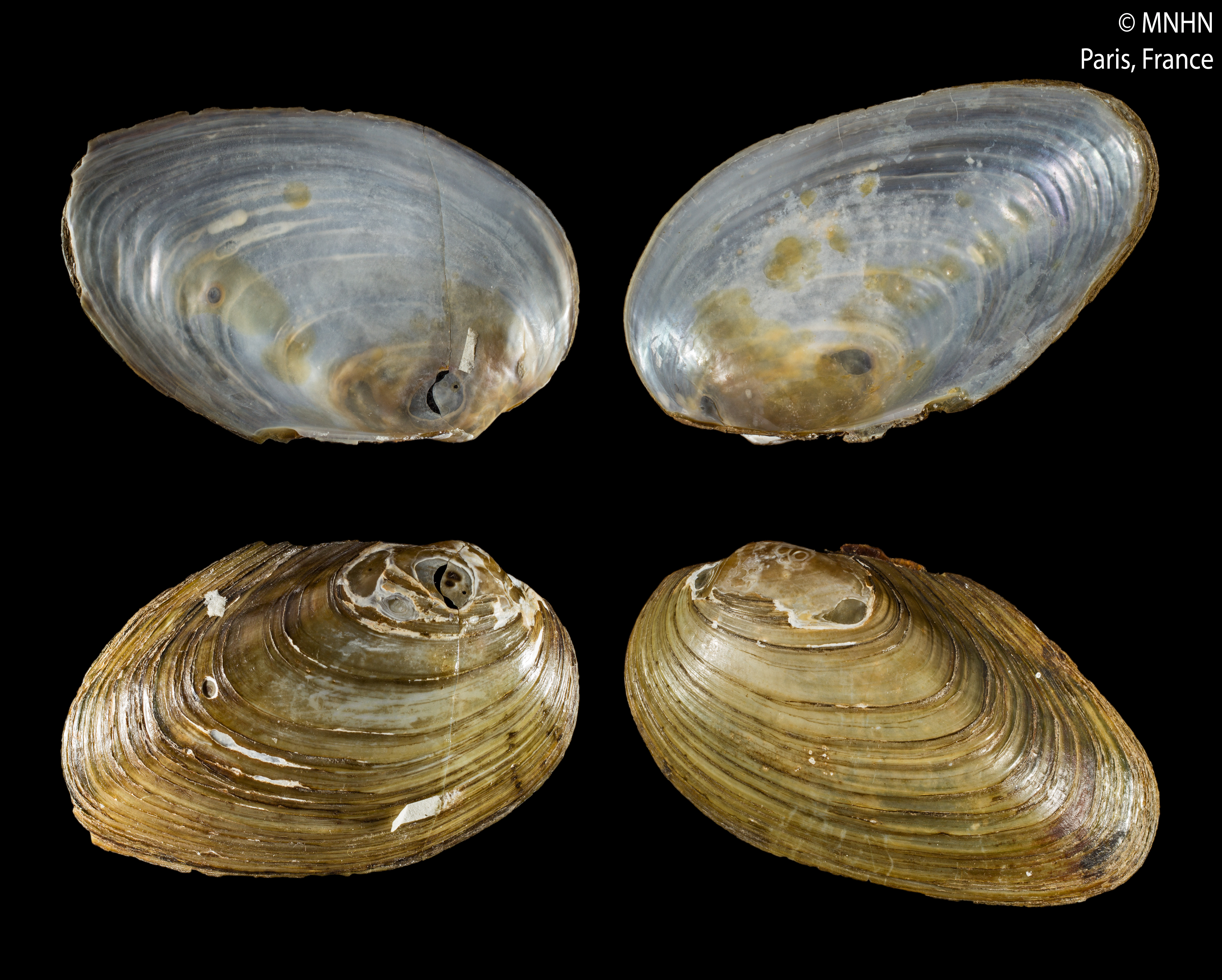
- Shell of Pyganodon fragilis (paralectotype at MNHN, Paris)

Scientific classification
- Domain: Eukaryota
- Kingdom: Animalia
- Phylum: Mollusca
- Class: Bivalvia
- Order: Unionida
- Family: Unionidae
- Subfamily: Unioninae
- Tribe: Anodontini
- Genus: Pyganodon; Crosse & Fischer, 1894

Synonyms
- Anodonta (Flexiplis) Rafinesque, 1831; Anodonta (Pyganodon) Crosse & P. Fischer, 1894; Flexiplis Rafinesque, 1831; Flexiptis Rafinesque, 1831

= Pyganodon =

Genus of bivalves

Pyganodon is a genus of freshwater mussels, aquatic bivalve mollusks in the subfamily Unioninae of the family Unionidae, the river mussels.

== Species within the genus Pyganodon ==
- Pyganodon cataracta (Say, 1817)
- Pyganodon fragilis (Lamarck, 1819)
- Pyganodon gibbosa (Say, 1824)
- Pyganodon grandis (Say, 1829)
- Pyganodon lacustris (I. Lea, 1857)

Synonyms

- Pyganodon implicata (Say, 1829): synonym of Utterbackiana implicata (Say, 1829)
- Pyganodon lugubris (Say, 1829): synonym of Pyganodon grandis (Say, 1829)
- Pyganodon marginata (Say, 1817): synonym of Pyganodon cataracta (Say, 1817)
- Pyganodon simpsonaia (I. Lea, 1861): synonym of Pyganodon grandis (Say, 1829)
- Pyganodon simpsoniana (I. Lea, 1861): synonym of Pyganodon grandis (Say, 1829)
