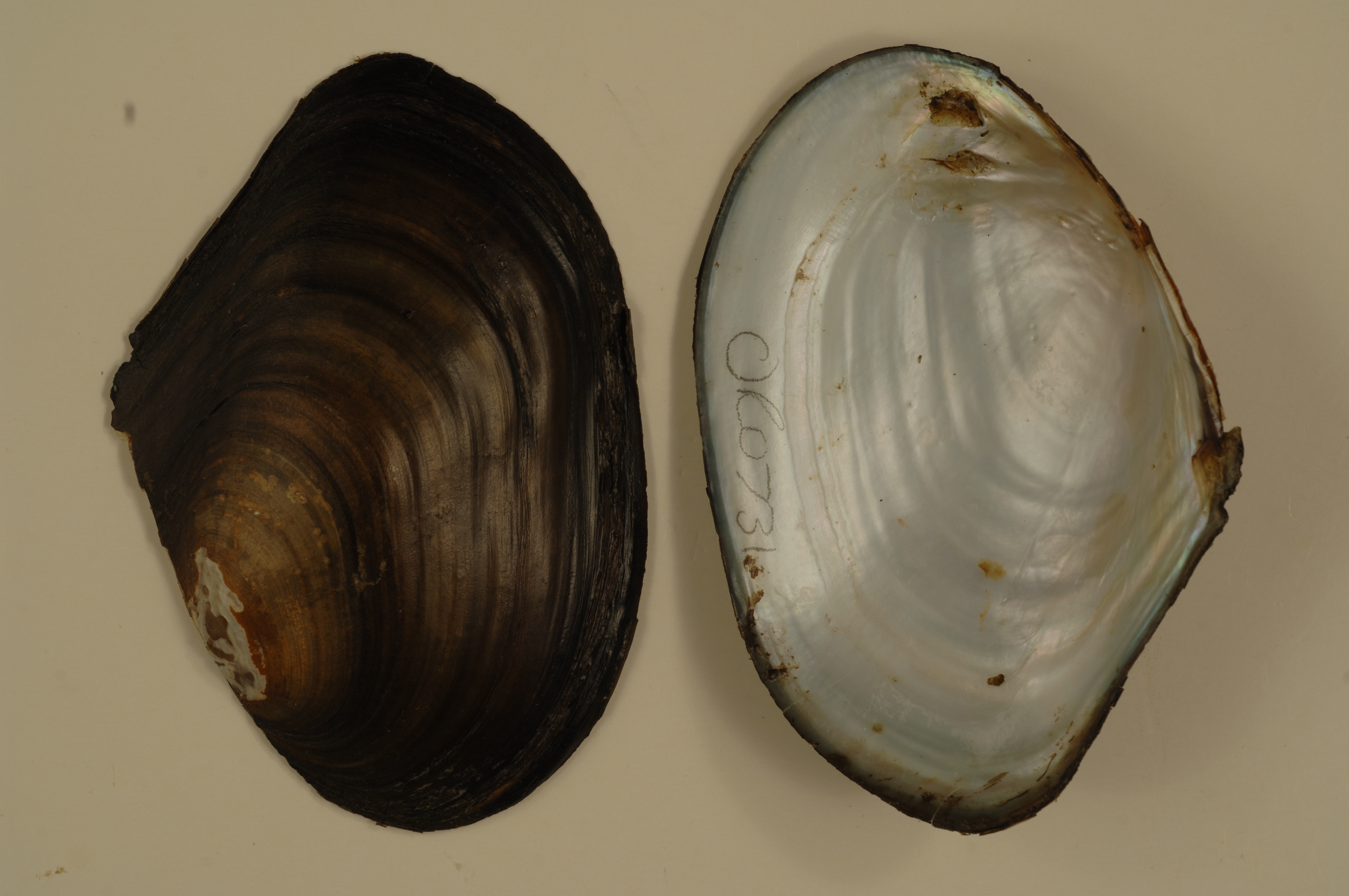

Conservation status
- Vulnerable (IUCN 3.1)

- Vulnerable (NatureServe)

Scientific classification
- Kingdom: Animalia
- Phylum: Mollusca
- Class: Bivalvia
- Order: Unionida
- Family: Unionidae
- Genus: Anodonta
- Species: A. californiensis

Binomial name
- Anodonta californiensis (Lea, 1852)

Synonyms
- Anodonta nuttalliana (Lea, 1838)

= Anodonta californiensis =

California floater

Species of bivalve

Anodonta californiensis, the California floater, is a species of freshwater mussel, an aquatic bivalve mollusk in the family Unionidae, the river mussels.

== Description ==
Anodonta californiensis have thin, elliptical shells and can reach a size of 5 inches (130 mm). They are very similar to A. nuttalliana, and recent studies believe the two may actually be part of the same clade. The two were thought to be distinguishable by the prominent dorsel wing which was lacking in the California floater.

== Distribution ==
The range of the California floater may include Idaho, California, Utah, Washington, Arizona, Wyoming, Nevada, and Mexico. The exact range is unclear and may overlap with A. nuttalliana.
