= Middendorffinaia mongolica =

Scientific classification
- Domain: Eukaryota
- Kingdom: Animalia
- Phylum: Mollusca
- Class: Bivalvia
- Order: Unionida
- Family: Unionidae
- Subfamily: Unioninae
- Tribe: Middendorffinaiini; Lopes-Lima, Bolotov, & Bogan, 2020
- Genus: Middendorffinaia; Moskvicheva & Starobogatov, 1973
- Species: M. mongolica

Binomial name
- Middendorffinaia mongolica (Middendorff, 1850)

Synonyms
- Margaritana mongolica (Middendorff, 1850) superseded combination; Middendorffinaia (Middendorffinaia) alimovi Bogatov, 2012; Middendorffinaia (Middendorffinaia) mongolica (Middendorff, 1850); Middendorffinaia (Pseudopotomida) dulkeitiana Moskvicheva & Starobogatov, 1973; Middendorffinaia (Pseudopotomida) hassanica Moskvicheva & Starobogatov, 1973; Middendorffinaia (Pseudopotomida) martensi Moskvicheva & Starobogatov, 1973; Middendorffinaia (Pseudopotomida) shadini Moskvicheva & Starobogatov, 1973; Middendorffinaia (Pseudopotomida) sujfunensis Moskvicheva & Starobogatov, 1973; Middendorffinaia (Pseudopotomida) weliczkowskii Moskvicheva & Starobogatov, 1973; Middendorffinaia (Suifunio) sujfunensis Moskvicheva & Starobogatov, 1973; Middendorffinaia alimovi Bogatov, 2012; Middendorffinaia arsenievi Moskvicheva & Starobogatov, 1973; Middendorffinaia dulkeitiana Moskvicheva & Starobogatov, 1973; Middendorffinaia maihensis Moskvicheva, 1973; Middendorffinaia shadini Moskvicheva & Starobogatov, 1973; Middendorffinaia ussuriensis Moskvicheva & Starobogatov, 1973; Unio crassus mongolicus Middendorff, 1850 superseded rank and combination; Unio douglasiae var. mongolicus Middendorff, 1850 superseded rank and combination; Unio mongolicus Middendorff, 1850 original combination

Species of bivalve

Middendorffinaia mongolica, formerly Middendorffinaia shadini, is a species of unionid mussel endemic to South Primorye, Russia. Its specific name honours Russian zoologist Vladimir Zhadin. Middendorffinaia shadini inhabits the river Razdolnaya, its tributaries Rakovka, Olenevka, Komarovka and Kiparisovka, as well as rivers Artemovka, Barabashevka and some parts of the rivers Tesnaya and Gladkaya.

== Conservation status ==
Middendorffinaia shadini is listed in the Red Book of Russia and, particularly, in the Red Book of Primorsky Krai. Middendorffinaia shadini is sensitive to water pollution and soil contamination.
