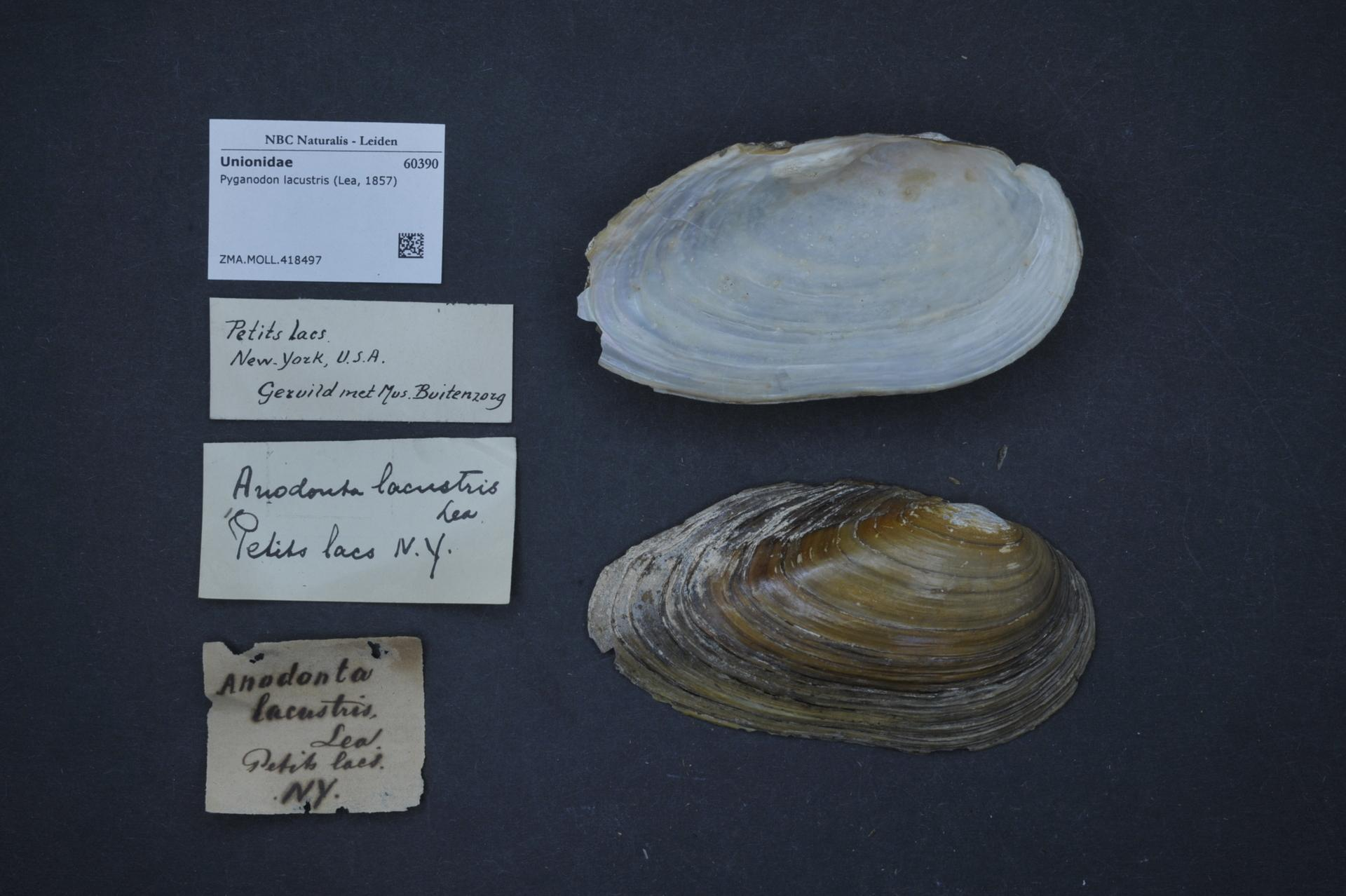

Conservation status
- Least Concern (IUCN 3.1)

- Apparently Secure (NatureServe)

Scientific classification
- Kingdom: Animalia
- Phylum: Mollusca
- Class: Bivalvia
- Order: Unionida
- Family: Unionidae
- Genus: Pyganodon
- Species: P. lacustris

Binomial name
- Pyganodon lacustris (Lea, 1857)

= Pyganodon lacustris =

Species of bivalve

Pyganodon lacustris is a species of freshwater mussel, an aquatic bivalve mollusk in the family Unionidae, the river mussels. It is endemic to the United States, where it is known to occur in Illinois, Ohio, Michigan, New York, Indiana and Wisconsin. It may also occur in the Great Lakes and into Canada, however its full range has not been fully assessed. It is commonly called the lake floater.

== Description ==
Pyganodon lacustris varies in size with the largest found to be around 20 centimeters (8 inches) with an average of around 10 centimeters (4 inches). They have an elliptical shape and is generally long and thin. The ventral is straight to slightly curved and color ranges from yellow-green in adolescence to dark brown or black in adulthood.
