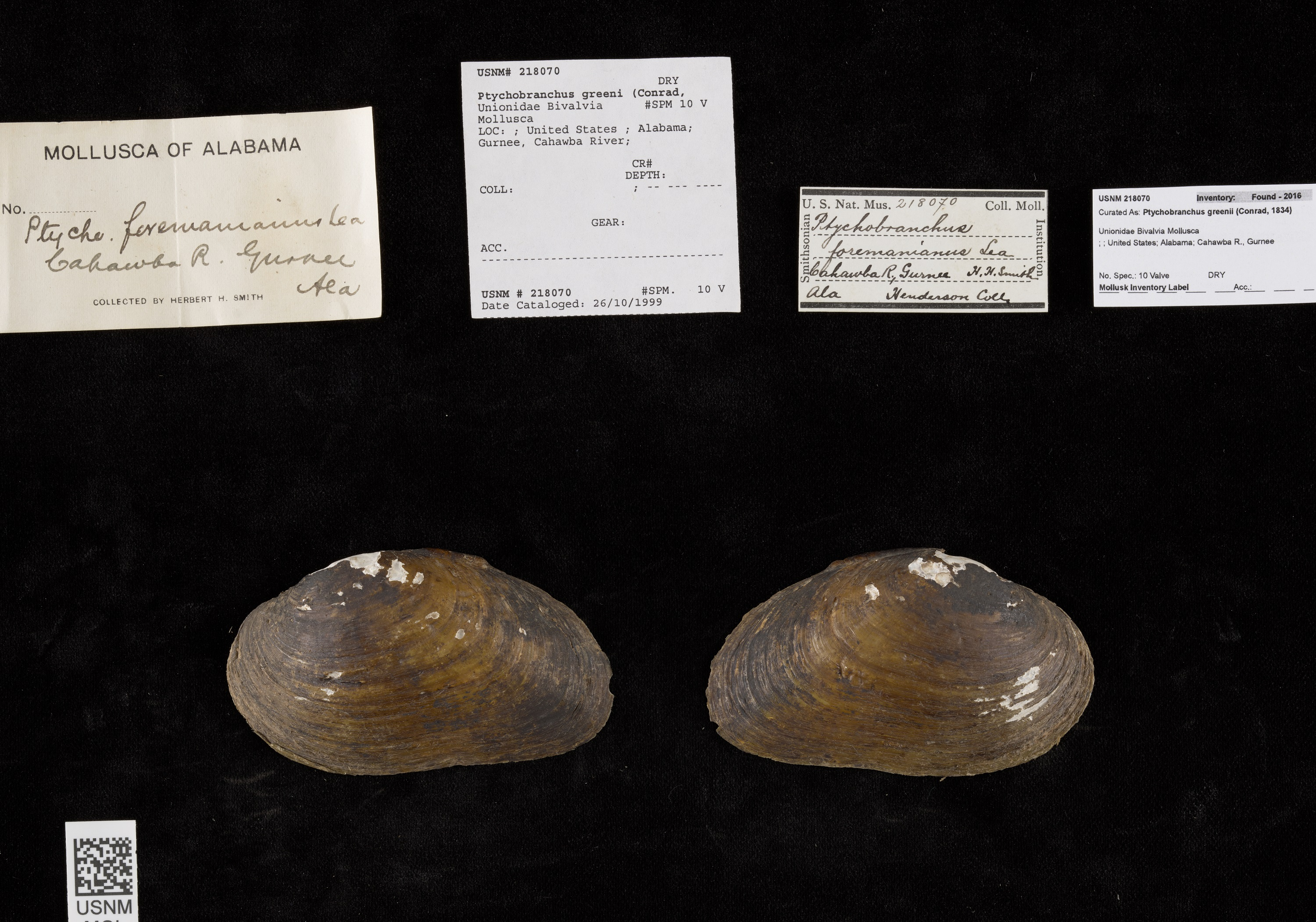

Conservation status
- Endangered (IUCN 3.1)

- Critically Imperiled (NatureServe)

Scientific classification
- Kingdom: Animalia
- Phylum: Mollusca
- Class: Bivalvia
- Order: Unionida
- Family: Unionidae
- Genus: Ptychobranchus
- Species: P. greenii

Binomial name
- Ptychobranchus greenii (Conrad, 1834)

Synonyms
- List: Unio brumbyanus; Unio brumbleyanus; Unio flavescens; Unio foremanianus; Unio greenii; Unio simplex; Unio trinacrus; Unio woodwardianus; Unio woodwardius

= Triangular kidneyshell =

Species of bivalve

The triangular kidneyshell (Ptychobranchus greenii) is a species of freshwater mussel, in the family Unionidae, the river mussels. It is endemic to Alabama in the United States, where it is known from several rivers and streams in the Mobile River Basin. It is a federally listed endangered species of the United States.

== Taxonomy ==
It was first described by Timothy Abbott Conrad in 1834. The specific name, according to Conrad, is "dedicated to my friend Jacob Green, M. D., Professor of Chemistry in Jefferson College, a gentleman well known as a contributor to Conchology." It was placed in Ptychobranchus by Simpson, 1900, due to the folded gills of the female that accommodate larvae packages, thus the meaning of the genus name, "folded gills".

== Description ==
This aquatic bivalve mollusc is somewhat oval in shape and may reach 10 cm (4 inches) in length. It is yellow to yellow-brown in color. The shell is quite variable in appearance and may be confused with some species of Pleurobema.

== Geography ==
This mussel was known from the Black Warrior River and tributaries, the Coosa River and its tributaries, and the Cahaba River. When it was placed on the Endangered Species List in 1993 it was limited to some tributaries of the Black Warrior River and the Conasauga River in the Coosa River drainage. Any remaining specimens in the Cahaba River are now treated as members of another species, Ptychobranchus foremanianus. It is extirpated from the main Black Warrior River, but it is present in at least two tributaries, which are protected within Bankhead National Forest.

== Habitat ==
It prefers shoals, reefs, and riffles with rapid currents in high-quality, clear streams.

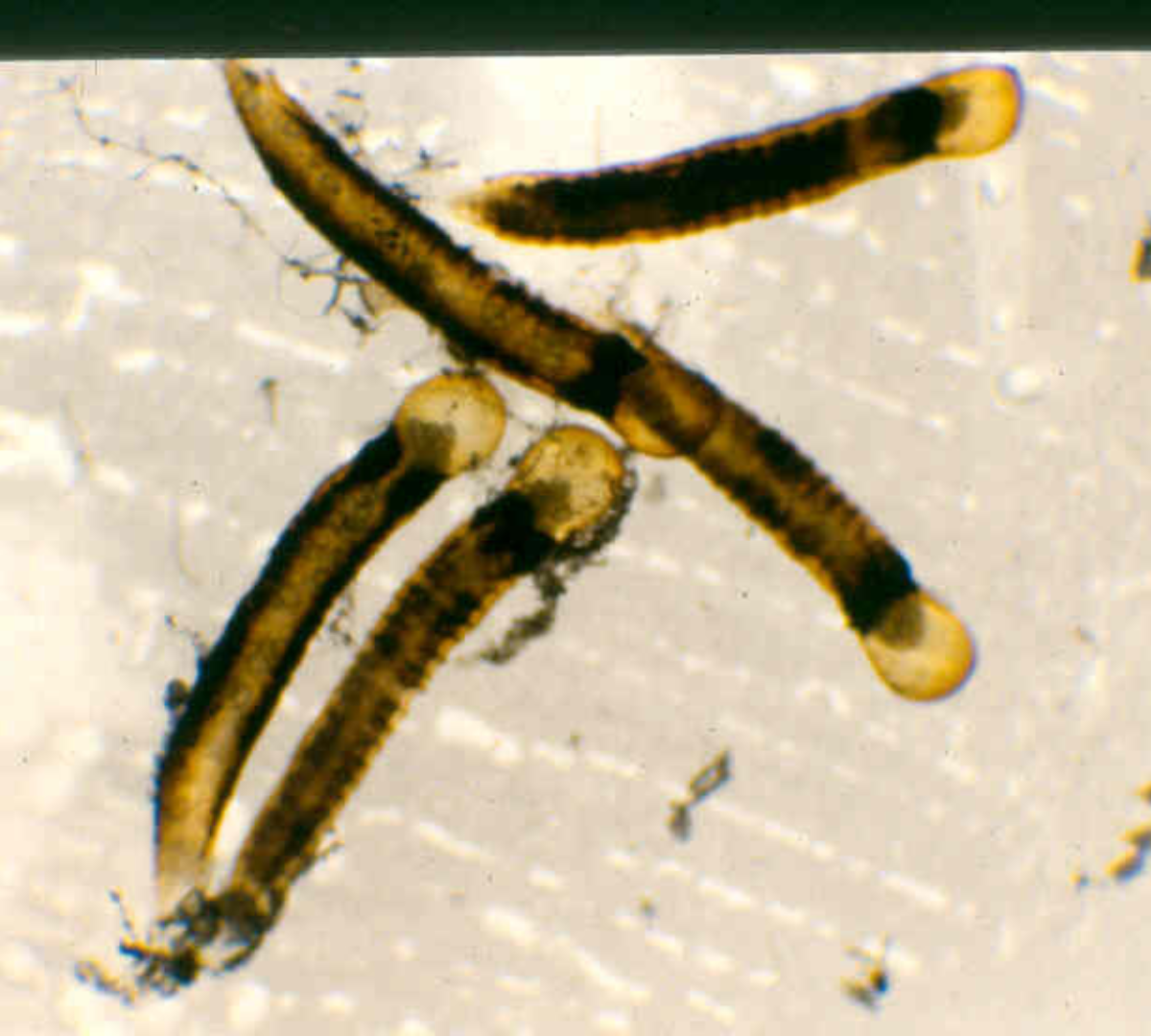
larvae packages of the triangular kidneyshell that mimic fly larvae

== Reproduction ==
The species is a long-term brooder, and holds its eggs over winter as they develop. In spring or summer the female releases her larvae, termed glochidia, glued together in packets called conglutinates. The conglutinate has a sticky filament that adheres to rocks and other surfaces to prevent it from being washed away. The conglutinate resembles a fly larva, or perhaps a fish egg, and appears appetizing to fish. When the conglutinate is squeezed, such as when a fish bites, it opens and releases the glochidia, which then lodge in the fish's gills as parasites. They develop into juvenile mussels and drop out of the fish, burying themselves in the stream bottom to further develop into adults. Many other mussels in family Unionidae have a similar process.

The warrior darter (Etheostoma bellator), Tuskaloosa darter (Etheostoma douglasi), and blackbanded darter (Percina nigrofasciata) have been identified as primary fish hosts for this species.

== Conservation ==
It is listed as Endangered under the Endangered Species Act. It is listed as Endangered on the IUCN Red List and G1 Critically Imperiled by NatureServe.

Alterations of river systems due to dams, sedimentation and soil erosion, agricultural and pesticide run-off, and water pollution are major threats to this species and most freshwater mussels.

Sediment and algal growth are threats to the species' reproduction, as they limit the ability of the larval packages to adhere to rocks and other substrate, and prevent fish from seeing them as they would in clear waters. In addition, studies have shown that many threatened freshwater mussels prefer deeper and faster-flowing streams, a habitat that dams and sediment accumulation destroy.
