= Sinanodonta beringiana =

Conservation status
- Least Concern (IUCN 3.1)

- Apparently Secure (NatureServe)

Scientific classification
- Kingdom: Animalia
- Phylum: Mollusca
- Class: Bivalvia
- Order: Unionida
- Family: Unionidae
- Genus: Sinanodonta
- Species: S. beringiana

Binomial name
- Sinanodonta beringiana (Middendorff, 1851)

Synonyms
- Anodonta beringiana Middendorff, 1851

Species of freshwater mussel

Sinanodonta beringiana, the Yukon floater, is a freshwater mussel, an aquatic bivalve mollusk in the family Unionidae, the river mussels.

Previously, Sinanodonta beringiana was classified as Anodonta beringiana.

Sinanodonta beringiana has a thin but strong shell. It resides in Alaska, the Yukon, the Aleutian Islands and Eastern Asia in the sandy and gravel bottoms of streams and lakes. They grow as parasites in host fish species and then drop off once they are mature and live for 20-40+ years. Once grown, they feed on phytoplankton and zooplankton, and are a main food source for otters and muskrat. Their conservation status is Secure, and recent research studying the effects of rising temperatures on S. beringiana shows that they are growing more quickly due to earlier and increased ice melting.

== Shell description ==
The shell is thin but strong and about twice as long as it is wide. It can grow up to 8.25 inches, is elliptical in shape, and has no teeth. The posterior portion of the valves has no wings.

In the juvenile phase, the shell's exterior is olive green. Once the mussel reaches maturity it turns to a darker, nearly black color. The surface will become rough with growth lines as the mussel ages. The interior of the shell ranges from gray to a dull blue color.

== Habitat and distribution ==
Yukon floaters can be found in Alaska, the Yukon Territories, the Aleutian Islands, and Kamachatka in Eastern Asia. Their habitats are the sandy and gravel bottoms of lakes, slow rivers, and streams

This species is difficult to identify, leading to misunderstandings of the origins of the species. Originally it was thought to come from the Fraser and Columbia river systems of British Columbia, but new records have not confirmed this. Furthermore, records of this species in Oregon and Washington are difficult to confirm and its presence there is undetermined.

== Life history ==
Males release sperm into the water, and aided by a light current find their way to the female which will siphon them up to fertilize them. The fertilized eggs will incubate in the female's gills until they hatch into larvae. They are then released and attach themselves parasitically to host fish. The host fish of S. beringiana are sockeye salmon, Chinook salmon, and three-spined stickleback. The larvae will attach to the gills of the host fish and gain nutrients through a thread gland. Glochidia will develop in the host fish until they reach a juvenile stage, where they will then attach themselves to the substrate of the water body they are released into. Larvae are typically found in host fish between May and August.

Yukon floaters live 20 to 40+ years. Due to their long lifespans and their dependence on host fish, they are considered bioindicators of the health of the waterways in which they live.

This species is an abundant food source for otters and muskrat and was once used by indigenous Alaskans for food, jewelry, and tools.

== Conservation status ==
Its global status is G4, or 'Apparently Secure'. This was last reviewed in 2007 and is in need of a global status review. In Yukon territory it is considered S2, or 'Imperiled'. In Alaska and Aleutian Islands it is considered S3, or 'Vulnerable'.

== Research ==
In an Alaskan lake, S. beringiana were observed in a 2010 study to investigate the effects of climatic warming trends on freshwater mussels and high elevation aquatic systems. They determined that mussels grow the fastest in the warmest months. Increased growth is due to factors that higher temperatures create, such as warmer air temperatures, and earlier melting of ice. The warming of waters allows for rapid growth of phytoplankton and zooplankton, a main food source for S. beringiana. The study concluded that these mussels have grown more quickly in recent years than years before.
