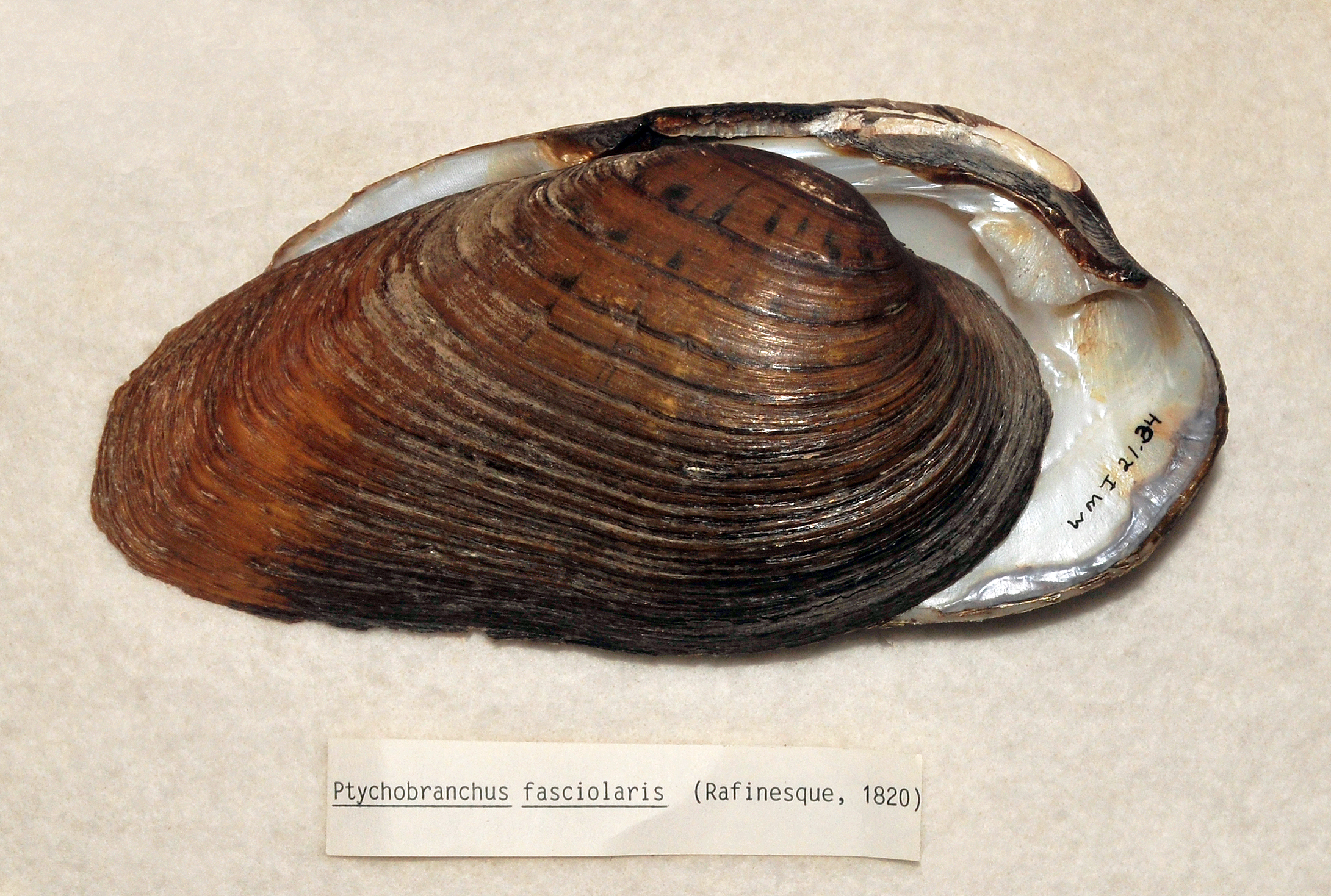

Conservation status
- Near Threatened (IUCN 3.1)

- Apparently Secure (NatureServe)

Scientific classification
- Kingdom: Animalia
- Phylum: Mollusca
- Class: Bivalvia
- Order: Unionida
- Family: Unionidae
- Genus: Ptychobranchus
- Species: P. fasciolaris

Binomial name
- Ptychobranchus fasciolaris (Rafinesque, 1820)

= Ptychobranchus fasciolaris =

Species of mollusc

Ptychobranchus fasciolaris is a species of freshwater mussel in the family Unionidae, the river mussels. Its common name is kidneyshell.

== Distribution and conservation status ==
This species is native to eastern North America, where its range includes much of the Mississippi River system. It is found in the drainages of the Ohio, Tennessee, and Cumberland Rivers.

The Canadian Species at Risk Act listed it in the List of Wildlife Species at Risk as an endangered species of Canada. In Canada the mussel is limited to Ontario, where it only remains in the Sydenham and Ausable Rivers and Lake Saint Clair. United States populations are more stable than those of Ontario.

== Reproduction ==
The larvae, or glochidia, of Unionidae are known to use the gills, fins, or skin of a host fish for nutrients during their development. Ptychobranchus fasciolaris enclose their glochidia in a membranous capsule called a conglutinate that resembles an insect larva or small fish. When a host fish bites the capsule bait, the Ptychobranchus fasciolaris glochidia attach to its gills, where they feed.
