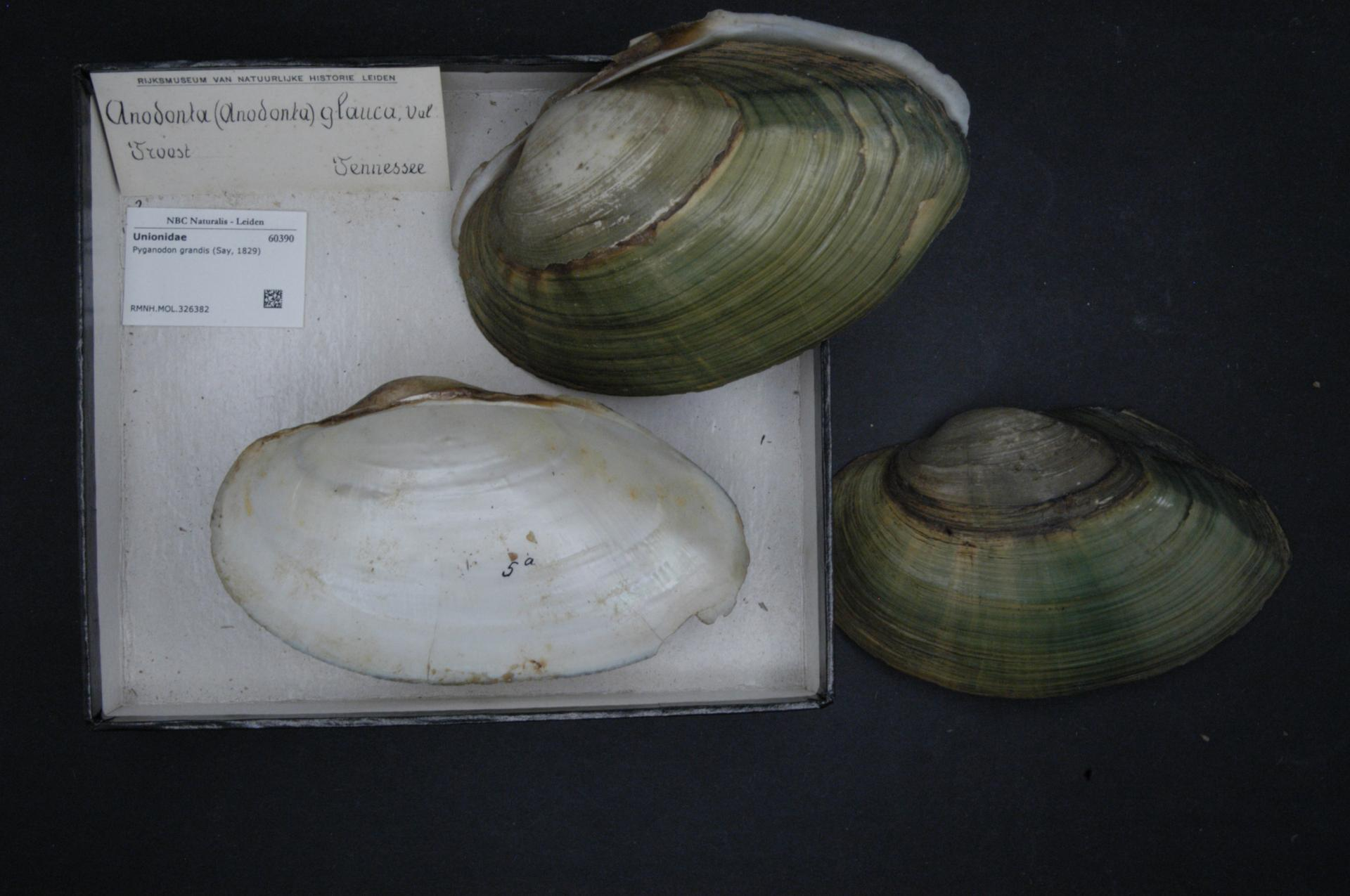

Conservation status
- Least Concern (IUCN 3.1)

- Secure (NatureServe)

Scientific classification
- Kingdom: Animalia
- Phylum: Mollusca
- Class: Bivalvia
- Order: Unionida
- Family: Unionidae
- Genus: Pyganodon
- Species: P. grandis

Binomial name
- Pyganodon grandis (Say, 1829)

Synonyms
- List: Anodonta grandis Say, 1829; Anodonta grandis subsp. grandis Say, 1829; Anodonta grandis subsp. simpsoniana Lea, 1861; Anodonta grandis subsp. corpulenta Cooper, 1834; Anodonta lugubris Say, 1829; Anodonta inflata Rafinesque, 1831; Anodonta stewartiana Lea, 1834; Symphynota benedictensis Lea, 1834; Anodonta corpulenta Cooper, 1834; Anodonta plana Lea, 1834; Anodonta declivis Conrad, 1834; Anodonta gigantea Lea, 1838; Anodonta ovata Lea, 1838; Anodonta salmonia Lea, 1838; Anodonta decora Lea, 1838; Anodonta pepinianus Lea, 1838; Anodonta harpethensis Lea, 1840; Anodonta footiana Lea, 1840; Anodonta maryattana Lea, 1840; Anodonta globosa Lea, 1841; Anodonta virens Lea, 1852; Anodonta linnaeana Lea, 1852; Anodonta opaca Lea, 1852; Anodonta lewisii Lea, 1857; Anodonta danielsii Lea, 1858; Anodonta gesnerii Lea, 1858; Anodonta texasensis Lea, 1859; Anodonta kennicottii Lea, 1861; Anodonta simpsoniana Lea, 1861; Anodonta leonensis Lea, 1862; Anodonta dallasiana Lea, 1863; Anodonta bealei Lea, 1863; Anodon subangulata J.G. Anthony, 1865; Anodon subinflata J.G. Anthony, 1865; Anodon imbricata J.G. Anthony, 1865; Anodon micans J.G. Anthony, 1865; Anodon opalina J.G. Anthony, 1865; Anodon mcnielii J.G. Anthony, 1866; Anodon subgibbosa J.G. Anthony, 1866; Anodon inornata J.G. Anthony, 1866; Anodon nopalatensis Sowerby, 1867; Margaron benedictii Lea, 1870; Anodonta sulcata Küster, 1873; Anodonta somersii Call, 1880; Anodonta houghtonensis Currier in DeCamp, 1881; Anodonta grijalvae Morelet, 1884; Anodonta tabascensis Morelet, 1884; Anodonta dakota Frierson, 1910; Anodonta dakotana Utterback, 1915; Anodonta inflata subsp. viridis Rafinesque, 1831; Anodonta inflata subsp. fuscata Rafinesque, 1831; Anodonta inflata subsp. zonalis Rafinesque, 1831

= Pyganodon grandis =

Species of bivalve

Pyganodon grandis, or the giant floater, is a species of freshwater mussel, an aquatic bivalve mollusk in the family Unionidae, the river mussels. This species is fast-growing, large, and has a short lifespan. It is variable and widespread across the United States and southeastern Canada.

Original description (Say 1829): "Shell very large, subovate; disk unequally wrinkled and undulated transversely, dark yellowish brown; umbo elevated; beak slightly elevated, with generally, two or three small sinuous, acute undulations; hinge margin slightly arquated, sometimes nearly rectilinear, somewhat angulated at its anterior termination, thence the edge descends by a nearly rectilinear, or slightly concave line to the anterior margin, which is considerably narrowed; sinus of the hinge margin concave; posterior margin widely rounded; within white margined, particularly before, with dusky."
