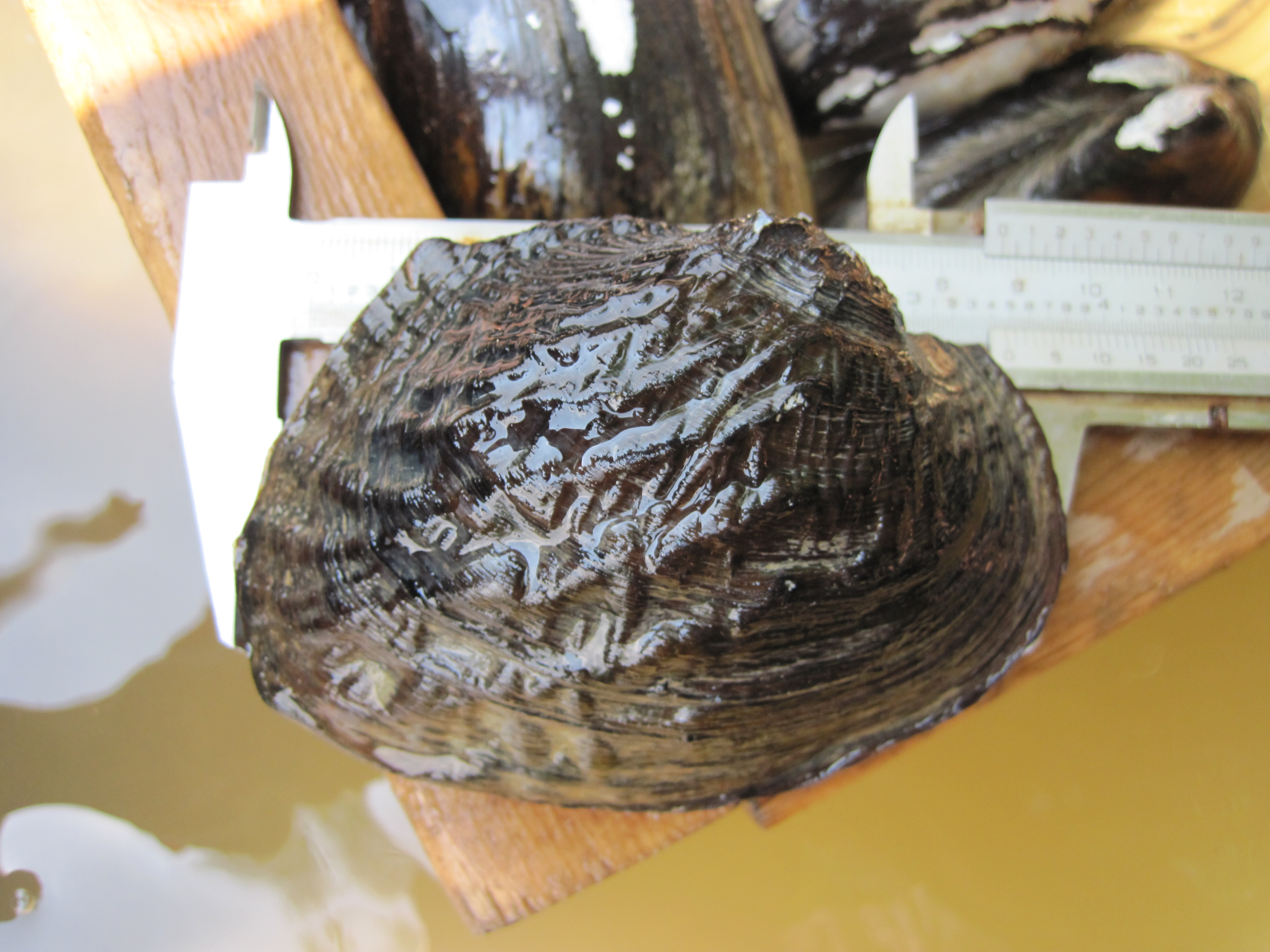
- A live individual of Arcidens confragosus

Scientific classification
- Domain: Eukaryota
- Kingdom: Animalia
- Phylum: Mollusca
- Class: Bivalvia
- Order: Unionida
- Family: Unionidae
- Tribe: Anodontini
- Genus: Arcidens (Simpson, 1900)

= Arcidens =

Genus of bivalves

Arcidens is a genus of freshwater mussels, aquatic bivalve molluscs in the family Unionidae, the river mussels.

== Species ==
Species within the genus Arcidens include:

- Arcidens confragosus
- Arcidens wheeleri
