= Pyganodon gibbosa =

Conservation status
- Near Threatened (IUCN 3.1)

Scientific classification
- Kingdom: Animalia
- Phylum: Mollusca
- Class: Bivalvia
- Order: Unionida
- Family: Unionidae
- Genus: Pyganodon
- Species: P. gibbosa

Binomial name
- Pyganodon gibbosa (Say, 1824)

Species of bivalve

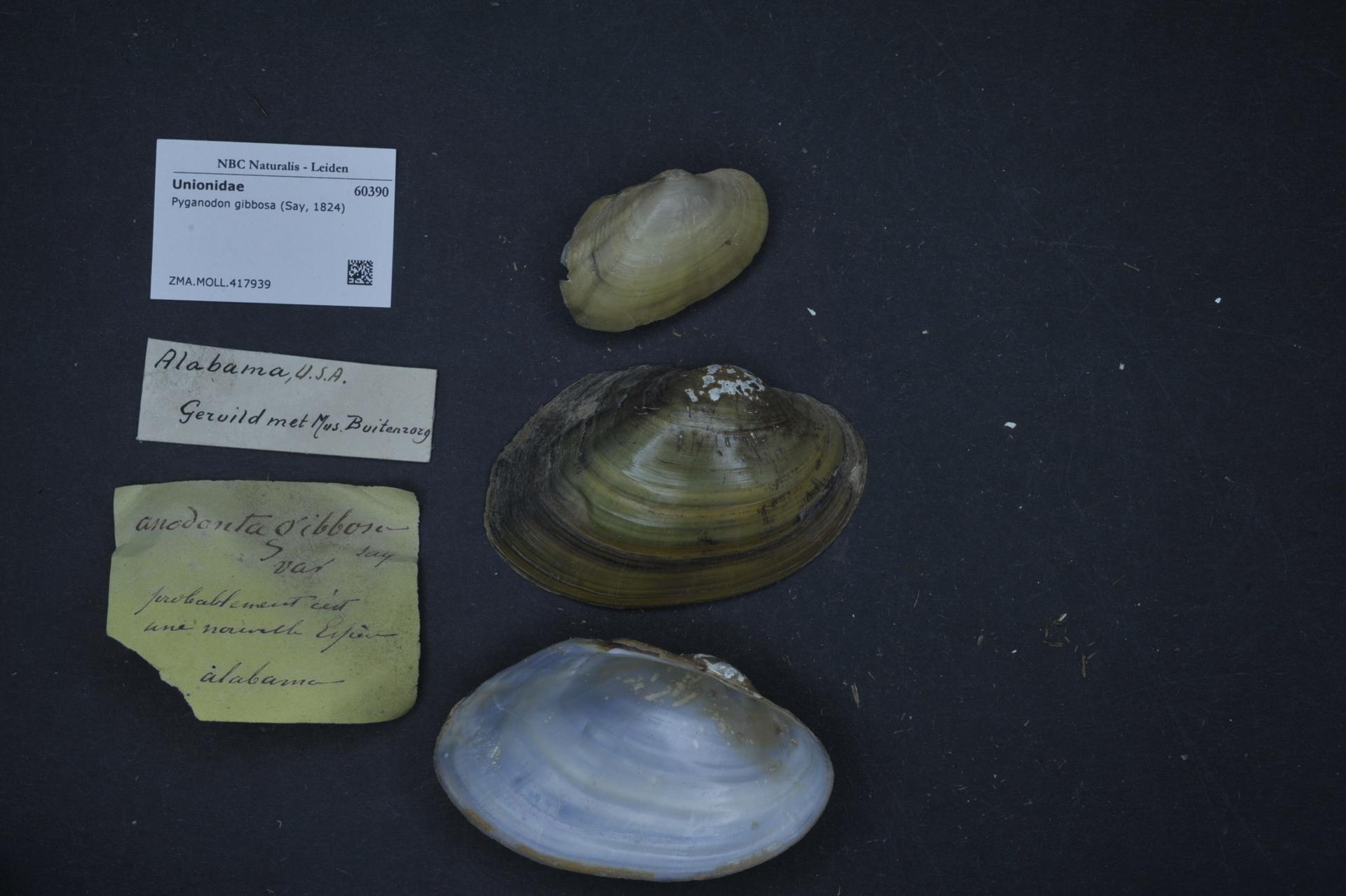

Pyganodon gibbosa is a species of freshwater mussel, an aquatic bivalve mollusk in the family Unionidae, the river mussels.

This species is endemic to the Altamaha River basin in Georgia of the United States.
