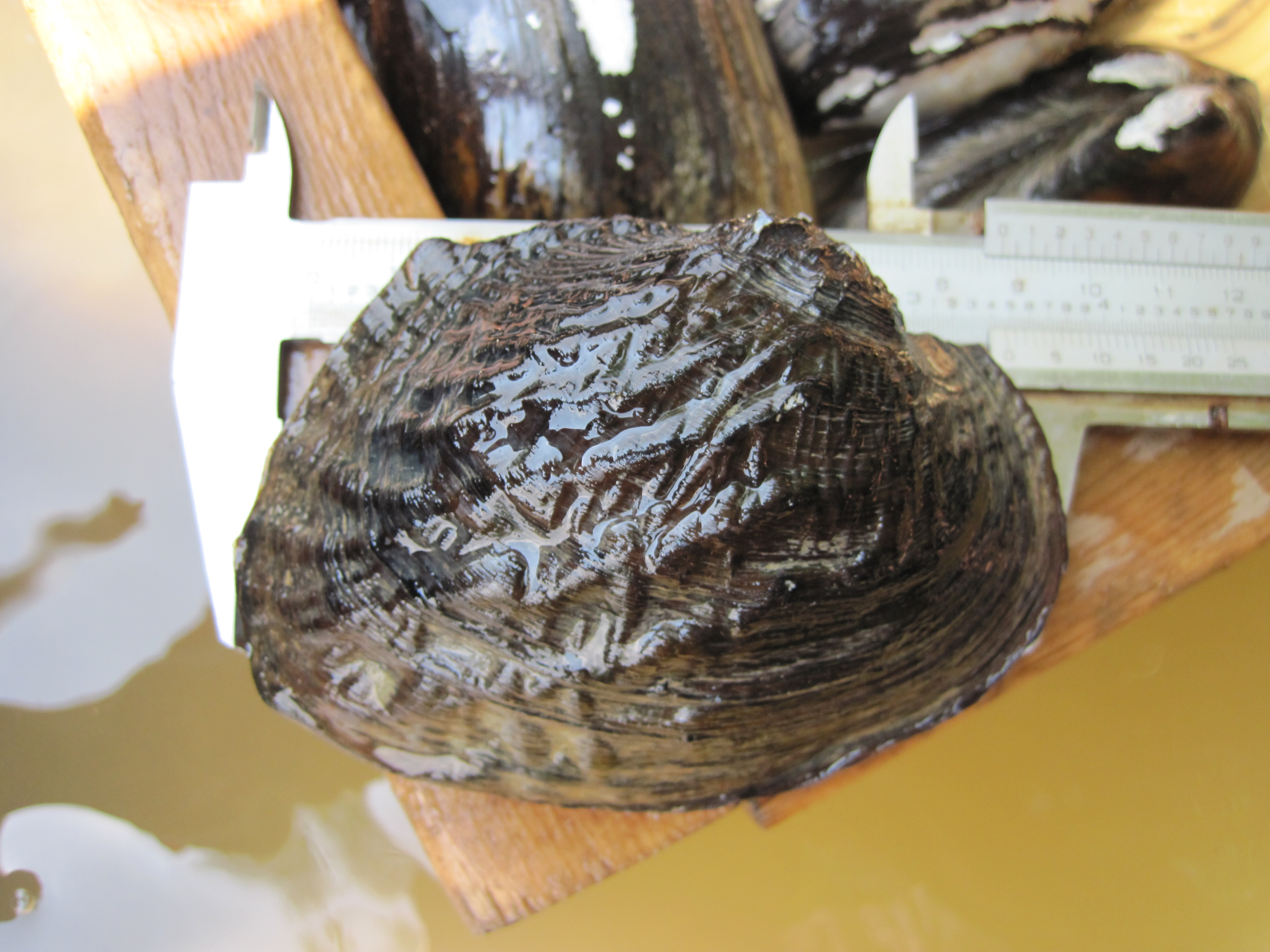
- A live individual of Arcidens confragosus

Conservation status
- Least Concern (IUCN 3.1)

- Apparently Secure (NatureServe)

Scientific classification
- Kingdom: Animalia
- Phylum: Mollusca
- Class: Bivalvia
- Order: Unionida
- Family: Unionidae
- Genus: Arcidens
- Species: A. confragosus

Binomial name
- Arcidens confragosus (Say, 1829)

Synonyms
- Alasmidonta confragosus (basionym); Margaritana confragosus; Complanaria confragosus; Baphia confragosus; Unio confragosus

= Arcidens confragosus =

Rock pocketbook

Species of bivalves

Arcidens confragosus is a species of freshwater mussels in the family Unionidae, the river mussels. It is commonly known as the rock pocketbook, but also has many other common names: bastard, black pocketbook, grandmaw, queen, and rockshell.

== Distribution ==
This species is widespread in central parts of the United States: it occurs in the Mississippi River drainage and in coastal rivers draining to the Gulf of Mexico, from the Colorado River in Texas east to the Mobile River System in Alabama.

== Description ==
The shell is "pyriform" or pear-shaped, heavily sculptured, but fairly thin, up to 15 centimetres (5.9 in) long. The shell is green to dark brown. The nacre is white, iridescent.
