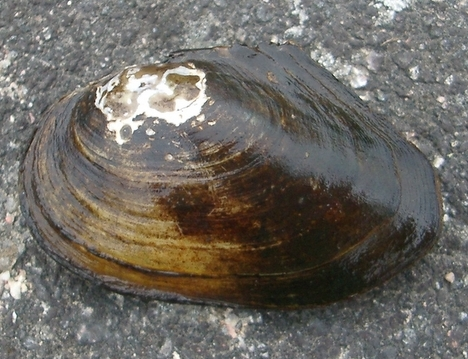
- A live individual of the duck mussel, Anodonta anatina

Conservation status
- Least Concern (IUCN 3.1)

Scientific classification
- Kingdom: Animalia
- Phylum: Mollusca
- Class: Bivalvia
- Order: Unionida
- Family: Unionidae
- Genus: Anodonta
- Species: A. anatina

Binomial name
- Anodonta anatina (Linnaeus, 1758)

Subspecies
- A. a. anatina (L., 1758); A. a. attenuata Held, 1836; A. a. radiata (O.F.Müller, 1774)
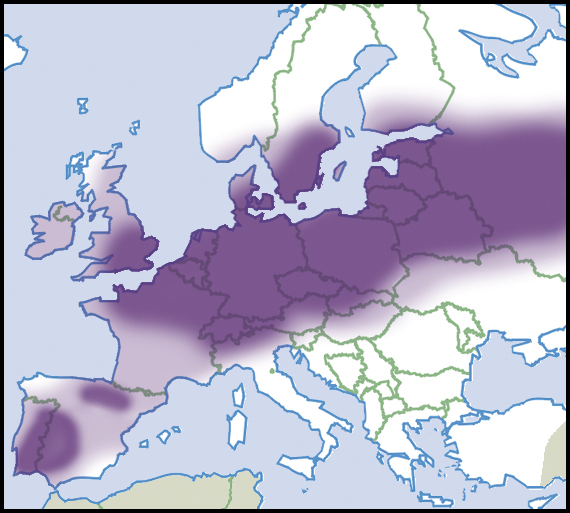
- Distribution of Anodonta anatina in Europe.

Synonyms
- Anodonta piscinalis Nilsson, 1823

= Duck mussel =

Species of bivalve

The duck mussel (Anodonta anatina) is a species of freshwater mussel in the family Unionidae, the river mussels.

== Description ==
See Animalbase below (external link).

Right and left valve of the same specimen:

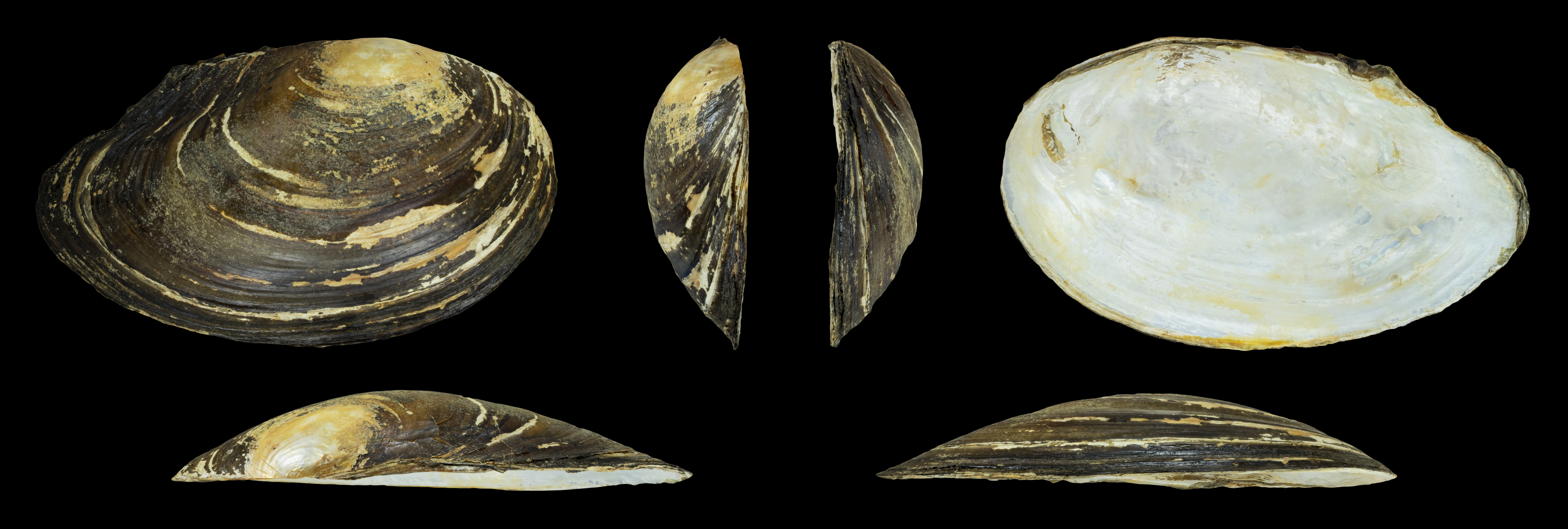
Right valve

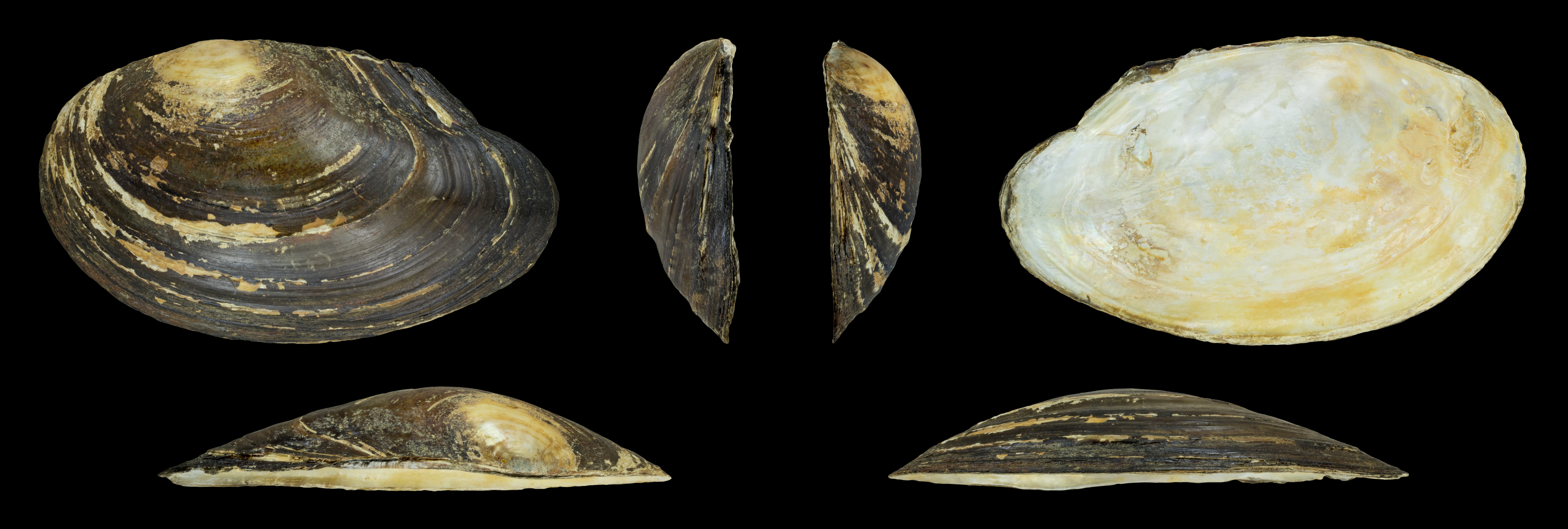
Left valve

== Distribution ==
The native distribution of this species is European-Siberian.

- Croatia
- Czech Republic – in Bohemia, in Moravia, least concern (LC)
- Germany – (Arten der Vorwarnliste) Listed as specially protected species in annex 1 of the Bundesartenschutzverordnung.
- Great Britain
  - Isle of Man – National Biodiversity Data Centre, Ireland found at Lhen mouth (1922–25) and at Guilcagh (1985). Not protected by Wildlife Act 1990.
- Ireland – recorded through much of the country
- Netherlands – yes
- Russia – Northwest European Russia to Siberia
- Slovakia
- Sweden – it is the most widely distributed large freshwater bivalve in Sweden
- Spain
- Finland
