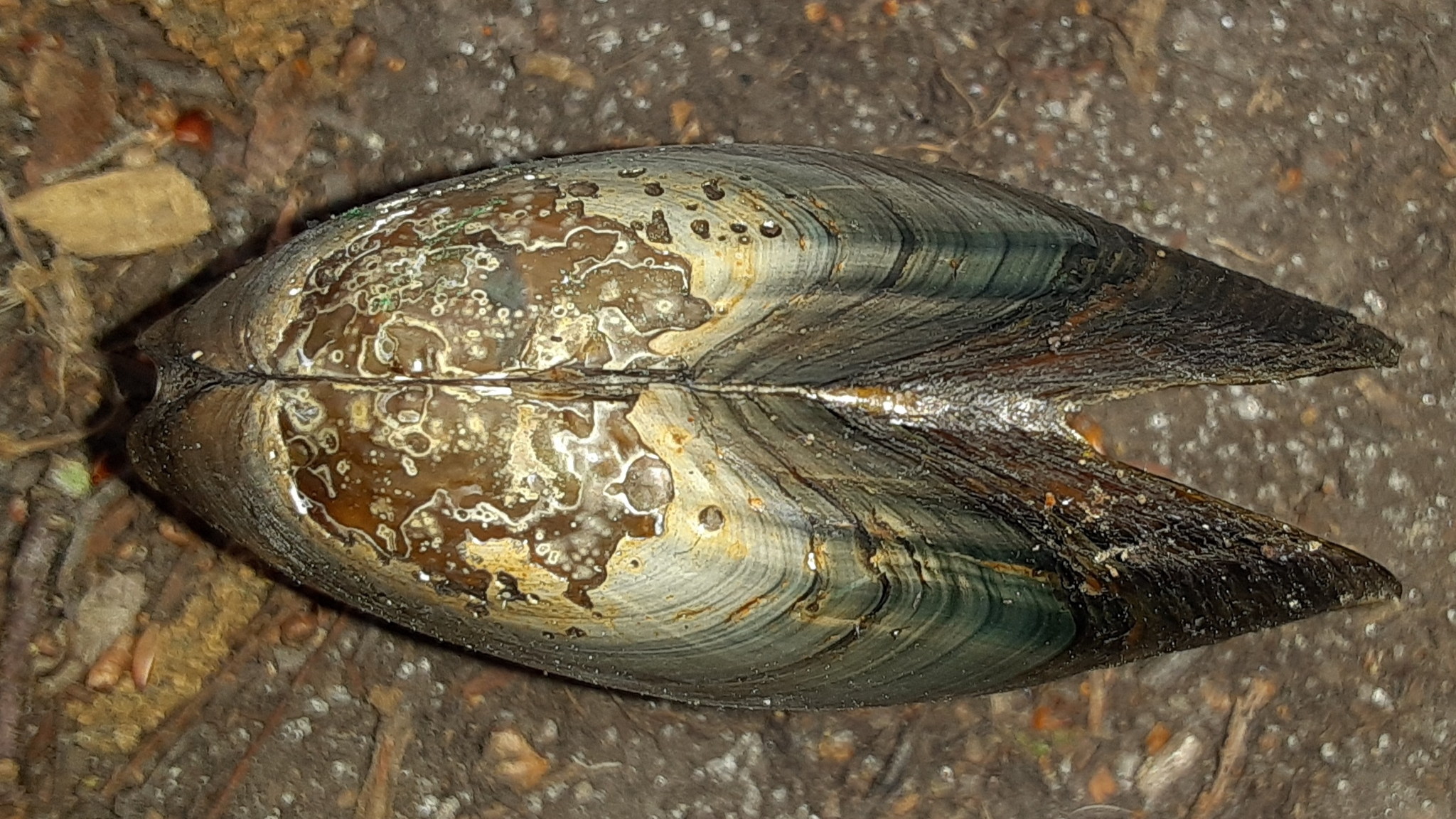
- Utterbackia imbecillis

Scientific classification
- Kingdom: Animalia
- Phylum: Mollusca
- Class: Bivalvia
- Order: Unionida
- Family: Unionidae
- Tribe: Anodontini
- Genus: Utterbackia; Baker, 1927

Type species
- Anodonta imbecilis Say, 1829

Species
- U. imbecillis (Say, 1829); U. peggyae (Johnson, 1965); U. peninsularis Bogan & Hoeh, 1995

Synonyms
- Anodonta (Utterbackia) Baker, 1927; Nayadina De Gregorio, 1914; Utterbachia Baker, 1927

= Utterbackia =

Genus of bivalves

Utterbackia is a genus of freshwater mussels, aquatic bivalve mollusks in the family Unionidae.

== Taxonomy and history ==
Utterbackia was erected in 1927 by Frank Collins Baker with Anodonta imbecillis (now Utterbackia imbecillis) as the type and sole species. The genus was named in honor of William Irvin Utterback, who authored several works on freshwater mussels.

== Species ==
This genus includes the following species:

- Utterbackia imbecillis (Say, 1829)
- Utterbackia peggyae (Johnson, 1965)
- Utterbackia peninsularis Bogan & Hoeh, 1995

Species formerly placed in this genus include:

- Utterbackia couperiana (Lea, 1840) and Utterbackia dunlapiana (Lea, 1842) – now accepted as Utterbackiana couperiana (Lea, 1840)
- Utterbackia hartfieldorum (Williams, Bogan & Garner, 2009) – now accepted as Utterbackiana hartfieldorum (Williams, Bogan & Garner, 2009)
- Utterbackia heardi (Gordon & Hoeh, 1995) – now accepted as Utterbackiana heardi (Gordon & Hoeh, 1995)
- Utterbackia suborbiculata (Say, 1831) – now accepted as Utterbackiana suborbiculata (Say, 1831)
