= Bundesartenschutzverordnung =

German federal regulation

The Federal Species Protection Regulations, first adopted on 19 December 1986, is a set of federal regulations in Germany. These regulations protect wild plants and animals. They are the implementing rules promulgated by the government to give force to the Federal Nature Conservation Act which passed on 1 January 1977. With the passage of new legislation, it became necessary to update the regulations. The current version of these laws dates from 16 February 2005. Annex 1 of these regulations lists the protected plants and animals. The protected species should not be confused with the Red Lists of animal and plant species in danger of extinction.
