= Glochidium =

Larvae of bivalves

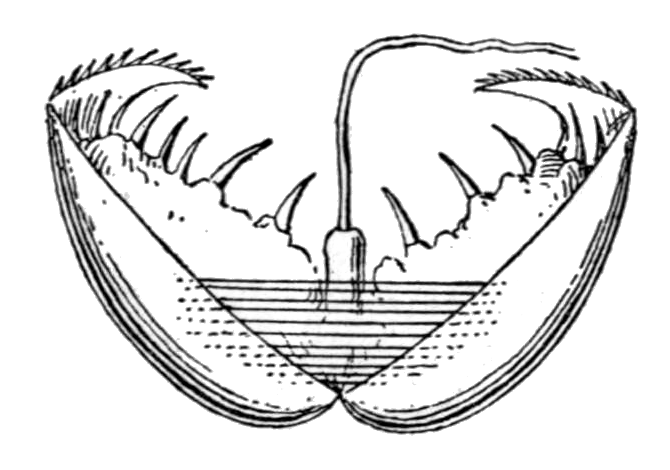
A drawing of the glochidium of the swan mussel (Anodonta cygnea). The larva is 0.35 mm long

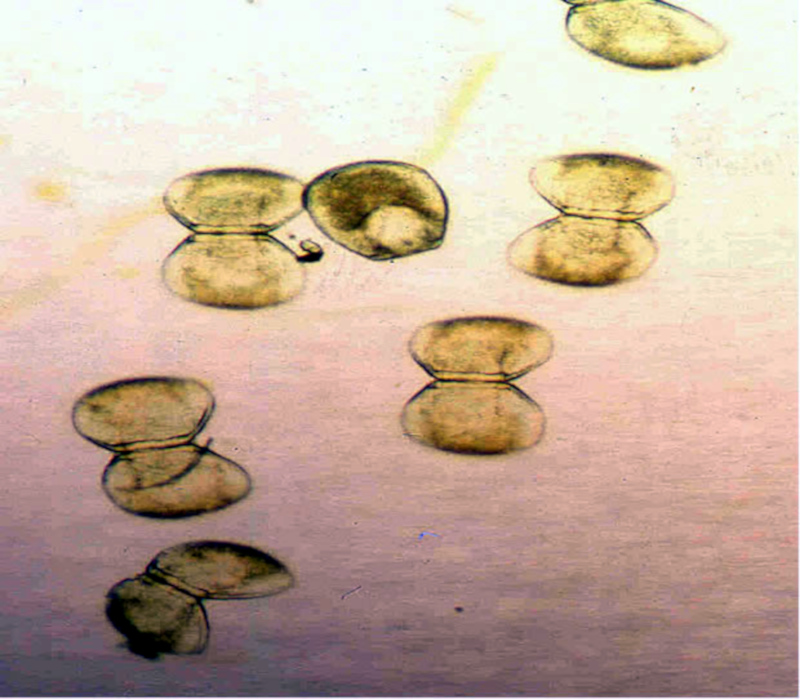
Glochidia of the mussel Lampsilis higginsii

The glochidium (plural glochidia) is a microscopic larval stage of some freshwater mussels, aquatic bivalve mollusks in the families Unionidae and Margaritiferidae, the river mussels and European freshwater pearl mussels.

These larvae are tiny and are typically between 100 and 200 micrometers, or approximately a third of the size of a grain of salt. They can be round or have hooks, attaching to the gills, fins and scales of fish (for example to the gills of a fish host species) for a period before they detach, fall to the substrate and take on the typical form of a juvenile mussel. Since a fish is active and free-swimming, this process helps distribute the mussel species to potential areas of habitat that it could not reach any other way.

Before the origin of this larval form was understood, they were described as "parasitic worms" on the fish host, although under normal circumstances, glochidia do not harm fish. Overexposure or heavy infections of glochidia may however greatly decrease the host's ability to respire. This is because the tissue which is heavily covered in glochidia will eventually convert to scar tissue and lose functionality.

Some mussels in the Unionidae, such as Ptychobranchus fasciolaris and P. greenii, release their glochidia in mucilaginous packets called conglutinates. The conglutinate has a sticky filament that allows it to adhere to the substrate so it is not washed away. There is also an even more specialized way of dispersal known as a super-conglutinate. The super-conglutinate resembles an aquatic fly larva or a fish egg, complete with a dark area that looks like an eyespot, and it is appetizing to fish. When a fish consumes it, it breaks up, releasing the glochidia. Mussels that produce conglutinates and super-conglutinates are often gill parasites, the glochidia attaching to the fish gills to continue their development into juveniles.

== See also ==
- Trochophore
- Veliger
