= Heelsplitter =

Heelsplitter is a common name that may refer to several species of North American freshwater mussels in the genera Lasmigona and Potamilus. The term refers to the sharp edge of the mussels' shells and, when referring to a specific species, is frequently preceded by a distinguishing word.

Species commonly known as heelsplitters include:

- Lasmigona alabamensis, commonly known as the Alabama heelsplitter
- Lasmigona complanata, commonly known as the white heelsplitter
- Lasmigona compressa, commonly known as the creek heelsplitter
- Lasmigona decorata, commonly known as the Carolina heelsplitter
- Lasmigona etowaensis, commonly known as the Etowah heelsplitter
- Lasmigona holstonia, commonly known as the Tennessee heelsplitter
- Potamilus alatus, commonly known as the pink heelsplitter
- Potamilus amphichaenus, commonly known as the Texas heelsplitter
- Potamilus inflatus, commonly known as the inflated heelsplitter
- Potamilus streckersoni, commonly known as the Brazos heelsplitter
