= List of non-marine mollusks of the Indiana Dunes =

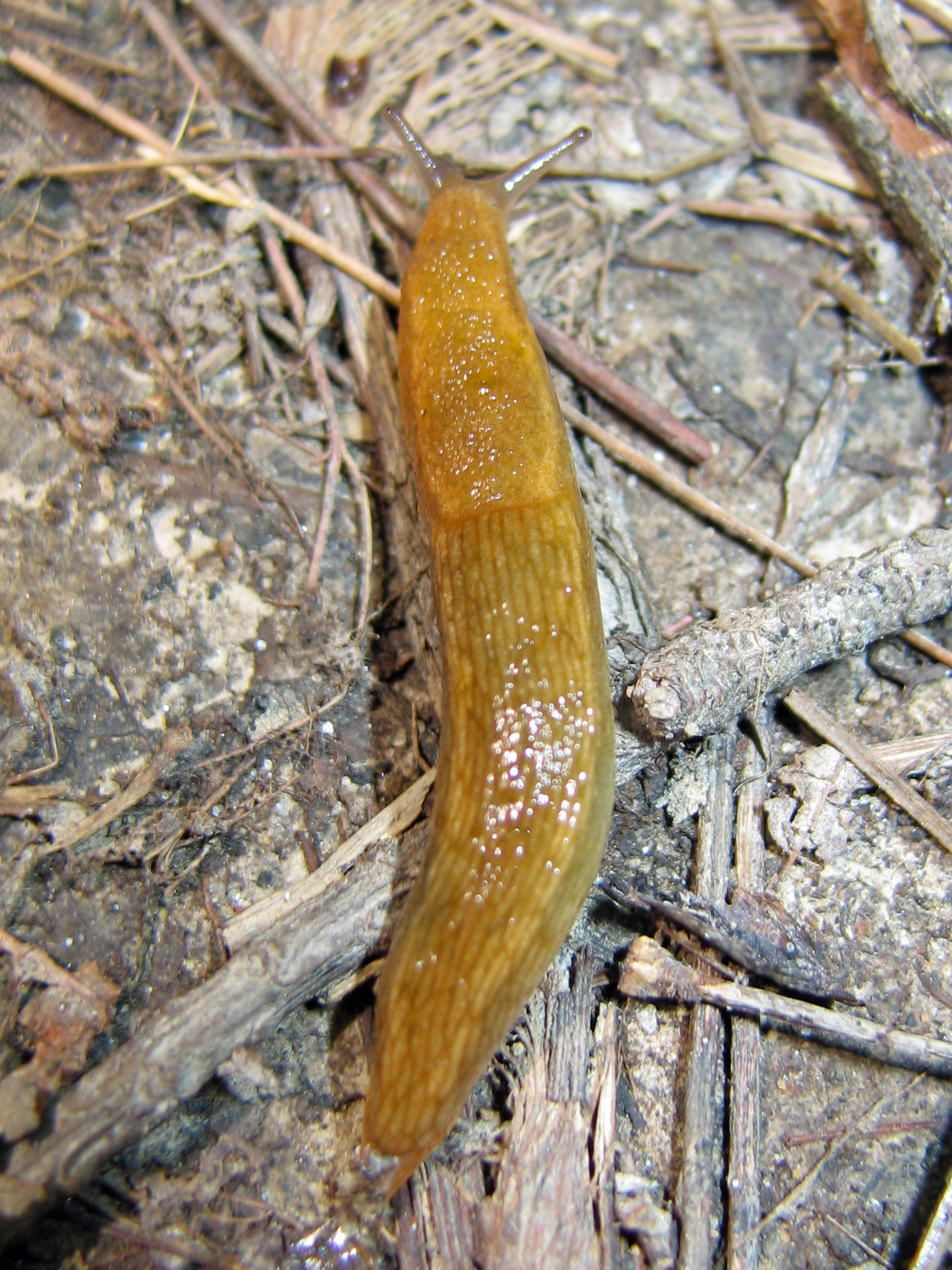
A slug at the Indiana Dunes

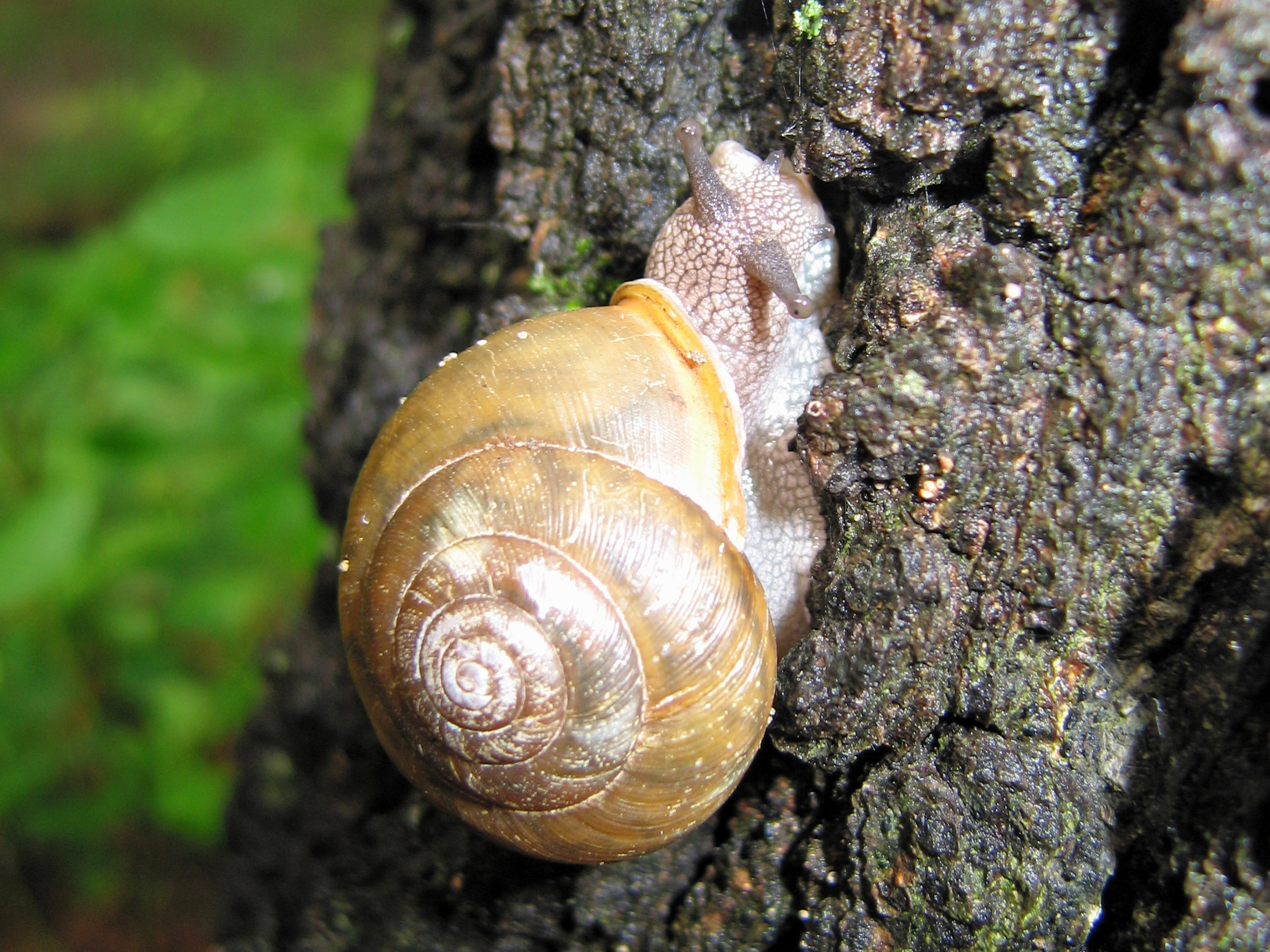
A snail at the Indiana Dunes

This is a list of the non-marine mollusks of the Indiana Dunes. Indiana Dunes National Park is a National Park Service unit on the shore of Lake Michigan in the state of Indiana, United States. A BioBlitz took place there on May 15 and 16, 2009. During that time, a list of organisms was compiled which included land and freshwater mollusks. 46 species of snails and slugs (non-marine gastropods) were found, as well as 20 species of freshwater bivalves, freshwater clams and mussels.

== List of gastropod species ==
=== Freshwater snails in alphabetical order ===
1. Amnicola limosus – a very small freshwater snail with a gill
2. Aplexa hypnorum = Aplexa elongata – small sinistral, air-breathing freshwater snail
3. Campeloma decisum – pointed campeloma, freshwater snail
4. Gyraulus parvus - rams horn snail, freshwater snail
5. Helisoma anceps – two-ridge rams horn snail
6. Menetus dilatatus – a small rams horn snail
7. Physella gyrina – an air breathing sinistral snail
8. Planorbella campanulata - a rams horn snail
9. Planorbella trivolvus – small aquatic snail
10. Planorbula armigera – ramshorn snail
11. Pleurocera acuta - hornsnail
12. Pomatiopsis lapidaria
13. Promenetus exacuous - small rams horn snail
14. Stagnicola caperatus – an air-breathing pond snail
15. Stagnicola elodes - an air-breathing pond snail
16. Valvata perdepressa – freshwater snail with a gill, valve snail

=== Land snails and slugs in alphabetical order ===
1. Anguispira alternata – flamed tigersnail
2. Arion sp. – land slug
3. Arion subfuscus – land slug
4. Catinella vermeta – land snail
5. Cochlicopa lubrica – glossy pillar
6. Deroceras laeve – land slug, pest to agriculture
7. Euchemotrema sp. – small snail
8. Euchemotrema froeteruum
9. Fossaria obrussa also known as Lymaea obrussa
10. Gastrocopta armifera - armed snaggletooth, land snail
11. Gastrocopta contracta - micromollusk, land snail
12. Gastrocopta similis - micromollusk, land snail
13. Glyphyalinia indentata - micromollusk, land snail
14. Haplotrema concavum
15. Helicodiscus parallelus – compound coil snail, land snail
16. Hoyia sheldoni in the family Hydrobiidae
17. Ariophanta laevipes - Laevapex fuscus
18. Limax maximus - great gray slug
19. Mesodon thyroides (=? Mesodon thyroidus)
20. Nesovitrea electrina - land snail
21. Novisuccinea ovalis- an ambersnail
22. Oxyloma sp. - an ambersnail
23. Pallifera fosteri - the foster mantle slug
24. Philomycus carolinianus – terrestrial land slug
25. Pupoides albilabris – a minute land snail
26. Strobilops aeneus - a minute land snail
27. Vallonia excentrica – a minute land snail common in Europe
28. Vertigo sp. - minute land snail
29. Zonitoides arboreus – land snail found in, but not indigenous to the Czech Republic, Great Britain, Slovakia and various greenhouses in other countries
30. Zonitoides nitidus – small land snail found mostly in Europe, but also in other countries

== List of bivalve species in alphabetical order ==
1. Amblema plicata - the threeridge, a freshwater mussel
2. Anodontoides sp. - a freshwater mussel
3. Corbicula fluminea - the Asian clam, introduced
4. Dreissena polymorpha - the zebra mussel, an invasive introduced species
5. Elliptio dilatata - spike mussel or lady finger
6. Fusconaia flava - a freshwater mussel
7. Lampsilis cardium - a freshwater mussel
8. Lasmigona complanata - the white heelsplitter
9. Lasmigona compressa - the creek heelsplitter
10. Lasmigona costata - heelsplitter
11. Musculium sp. - a freshwater clam
12. Pisidium sp. - a pea clam
13. Pleurobema sintoxia - the round pigtoe
14. Quadrula pustulosa - the pimpleback
15. Quadrula quadrula - the mapleleaf
16. Sphaerium occidentale - a fingernail clam
17. Sphaerium simile - a fingernail clam
18. Strophitus undulatus - a freshwater mussel
19. Venustaconcha ellipsiformis - the ellipse, a freshwater mussel
20. Villosa iris - the rainbow mussel
