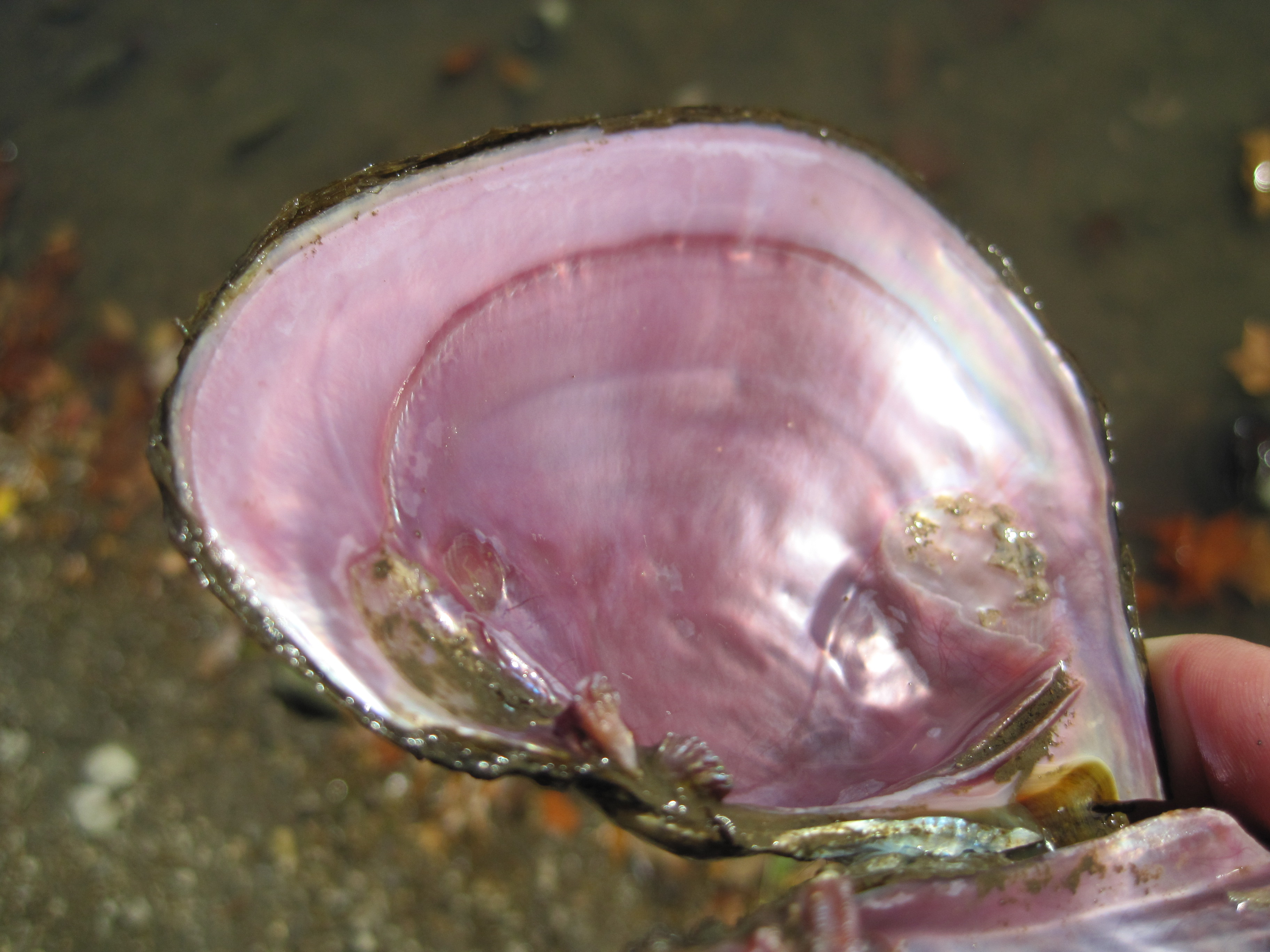
- Interior of the left valve of Potamilus ohiensis, showing the pink nacre

Conservation status
- Least Concern (IUCN 3.1)

- Secure (NatureServe)

Scientific classification
- Kingdom: Animalia
- Phylum: Mollusca
- Class: Bivalvia
- Order: Unionida
- Family: Unionidae
- Genus: Potamilus
- Species: P. ohiensis

Binomial name
- Potamilus ohiensis (Rafinesque, 1820)

= Potamilus ohiensis =

Species of bivalve

Potamilus ohiensis, the pink papershell, is a species of freshwater mussel, an aquatic bivalve mollusk in the family Unionidae. It is also known as the papershell or fragile heelsplitter, and is similar to the Leptodea fragilis and Potamilus alatus species.

== Description ==
The pink papershell has a thin, compressed, elongate shell, with rounded anterior and posterior ends. The surface is shiny, and brown or olive green in color. The nacre is pink or purple. These freshwater mussels grow as large as 7 inches (18 cm) in length. They generally live in large rivers, with mud, sand or silt bottoms. Fish known as the freshwater drum and white crappie act as hosts for the glochidia larvae of P. ohiensis.
