= Alabama heelsplitter =

The phrase Alabama heelsplitter has been used as a common name for two different species of American river mussels, freshwater bivalves, both of which can be found in Alabama. The two species are:

- Lasmigona alabamensis or Lasmigona complanata alabamensis, still known as the "Alabama heelsplitter"
- Potamilus inflatus, now known as the "Inflated heelsplitter"; this species was previously sometimes called "Alabama heelsplitter"; the common name was changed to avoid confusion
