= Skirted hornsnail =

Conservation status
- Near Threatened (IUCN 3.1)

- Imperiled (NatureServe)

Scientific classification
- Kingdom: Animalia
- Phylum: Mollusca
- Class: Gastropoda
- Subclass: Caenogastropoda
- Order: incertae sedis
- Family: Pleuroceridae
- Genus: Pleurocera
- Species: P. pyrenella

Binomial name
- Pleurocera pyrenella (Conrad, 1834)

Synonyms
- Melania planogyra Anthony, 1854; Melania pyrenella Conrad, 1834; Melania spinalis Lea, 1845; Pleurocera conradi Tryon, 1865

Species of gastropod

The skirted hornsnail, scientific name Pleurocera pyrenella, is a species of freshwater snail with an operculum, an aquatic gastropod mollusc in the family Pleuroceridae. This species is endemic to the United States.
