= Rugged hornsnail =

Conservation status
- Vulnerable (IUCN 2.3)

- Vulnerable (NatureServe)

Scientific classification
- Kingdom: Animalia
- Phylum: Mollusca
- Class: Gastropoda
- Subclass: Caenogastropoda
- Order: incertae sedis
- Family: Pleuroceridae
- Genus: Pleurocera
- Species: P. alveare

Binomial name
- Pleurocera alveare (Conrad, 1834)

Synonyms
- List: Io alveare (Conrad, 1834); Melania abscida Anthony, 1860; Melania alveare Conrad, 1834; Melania formosa Conrad, 1835; Melania grossa Anthony, 1860; Melania pernodosa Lea, 1845; Melania producta Lea, 1843; Melania pumila Lea, 1845; Melania torquata Lea, 1843; Pleurocera plicatum Tryon, 1863; Trypanostoma lesleyi Lea, 1864

Species of gastropod

The rugged hornsnail, scientific name Pleurocera alveare, is a species of freshwater snail with an operculum, an aquatic gastropod mollusk in the family Pleuroceridae. This species is endemic to the United States.
