= Anodontoides radiatus =

Conservation status
- Near Threatened (IUCN 3.1)

- Imperiled (NatureServe)

Scientific classification
- Kingdom: Animalia
- Phylum: Mollusca
- Class: Bivalvia
- Order: Unionida
- Family: Unionidae
- Genus: Anodontoides
- Species: A. radiatus

Binomial name
- Anodontoides radiatus (Conrad, 1834)

Synonyms
- Alasmodonta radiata Conrad, 1834; Margaritana elliottii Lea, 1858; Margaritana elliptica Lea, 1859; Anodonta showalterii Lea, 1860

Species of bivalve

Anodontoides radiatus is a species of freshwater mussel, an aquatic bivalve mollusk in the family Unionidae, the river mussels. In 2018, Smith, Johnson, Pfeiffer and Gangloff placed this species in genus Strophitus on the basis of morphological and molecular features. As of 2023, it is under review for listing under the Endangered Species Act of 1973.

== Distribution ==
This species is endemic to the United States.
