= Megalodiscus temperatus =

Scientific classification
- Kingdom: Animalia
- Phylum: Platyhelminthes
- Class: Trematoda
- Order: Plagiorchiida
- Family: Cladorchiidae
- Genus: Megalodiscus
- Species: M. temperatus

Binomial name
- Megalodiscus temperatus (Stafford, 1905)

Species of flatworm

Megalodiscus temperatus is a Digenean in the phylum Platyhelminthes. This parasite belongs to the Cladorchiidae family and is a common parasite located in the urinary bladder and rectum of frogs. The primary host is frogs and the intermediate hosts of Megalodiscus temeperatus are freshwater snails in the genus Helisoma.

== Morphology ==
Megalodiscus temperatus are flukes that contain a pair of posterior fluid filled pouch located in the oral sucker with a posterior sucker that is equal to the largest width of the body. The tegumental surface of this parasite contains various rows of indentations. The patterns of the indentation merge into several areas into folds with ridges that represent the posterior and genital pores.

== Reproduction ==
The reproduction of Megalodiscus temperatus are displayed in the stomach and rectum of frogs and tadpoles. The snails that are diffused with miracidia releases cercariae into the water to penetrate the skin of frogs. The frogs regularly cast off the outer layers of the skin which results in their exposure to metaceriae. The metaceriae remains in the rectum of the frog and matures in the time span of four months. Tadpoles are less commonly infected, but when infected they are infected by the ingestion of cercaria. Through the process of metaphorphosis, Megalodiscus temperatus travels primarily from the anterior to the posterior of the rectum.

== Geographical range ==
Megalodiscus temperatus are commonly prevalent in the high altitude regions of the United States.

== Life cycle ==
- The adult worms live in the rectum of frogs or in the pyloric ceca of several species of fish including trout, sunfish and bass.
- Eggs are laid fully embryonated containing miracidia that enter the first intermediate hosts.
- In Megalodiscus temperatus, the hepatopancreas of snails is finally parasitized, whereas in the gills of fingernail clams are penetrated.
- In both hosts miracidia transform into mother sporocysts, which give rise to 2–3 generations.
- The last one produces with a pharyngeal pouch.
- The ocellated cercariae escape daily from infected intermediate hosts and attach to the skin of tadpoles or frogs and enter the muscles where they encyst and grow to be infectious.

== Transmission ==
Megalodiscus temperatus preferentially infects snails-its first intermediate host, tadpoles, and frogs-its definitive host. Thus, environments harboring M. temperatus include streams, ponds, and bodies of water. Snails, commonly Helisoma trivolvis, H. antosum and H. campanulata, acquire infection by way of miracidia penetration. Upon embryonated egg deposition into aqueous environments from feces of adult flukes in the large intestine of tadpoles and rectum of frogs, miracidia penetrate snails and undergo three generations of rediae in the liver-the third producing and releasing an immature cercariae into the tissues of the snail host. Daily shedding of mature cercariae opportunistically encyst on the skin of tadpoles and adult frogs, particularly the dark spots of the fore and hindlegs. Tadpoles then become infected by ingestion of such encysted metacercariae or inhalation of free cercariae and attach onto the large intestine and become gravid. During the process of metamorphosis, the process at which tadpoles structurally mature into adult frogs, flukes migrate superiorly into the small intestine, as far as possible as to elude being dispensed. As the intestine shortens after metamorphosis and adolescent frogs begin development of a protein diet, the remaining flukes return to the rectum. Infection in adult frogs may also occur by ingestion of metacercariae.

== Diagnosis ==
Infection by M. temperatus may be identified by examining miracidia on snails, dead cercariae or formed metacercariae on tadpoles, and/or rectal flukes in adult frogs via dissection.

== Treatment ==
Based on the similar tegument integrity of M. temperatus, in comparison with other anthelmintics, Praziquantel (PZQ) may be used as treatment to combat infection.

== Disease control ==
Vulnerable populations in North America susceptible to M. temperatus infection include snails-first definitive hosts, tadpoles, and frogs-definitive hosts to the parasite. Localized in the hepatopancreas of snails, large intestine of tadpoles, and rectum of adult frogs, means of disease control include: random and periodic testing of vulnerable species populations for infection, controlling both snail and frog populations, and/or controlling saturated ecosystems infected with M. temperatus via pesticides, introduction of new species to combat transmission and minimize both transmission prevalence and incidence of infection.
