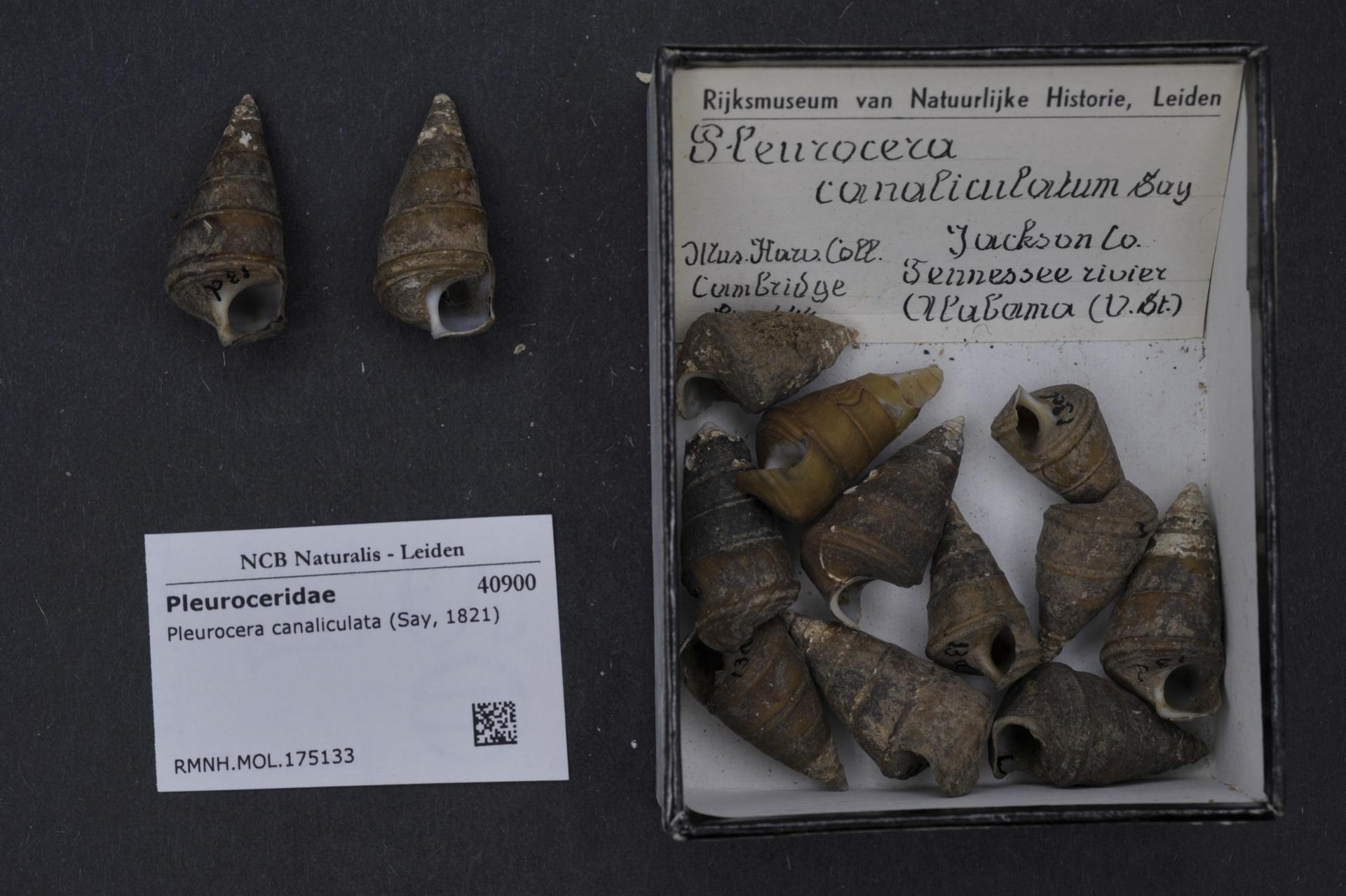
- Pleurocera canaliculata shells

Conservation status
- Secure (NatureServe)

Scientific classification
- Kingdom: Animalia
- Phylum: Mollusca
- Class: Gastropoda
- Subclass: Caenogastropoda
- Order: incertae sedis
- Family: Pleuroceridae
- Genus: Pleurocera
- Species: P. canaliculata

Binomial name
- Pleurocera canaliculata (Say, 1821)

Synonyms
- List: Cerithidea (Ceriphasia) sulcata Swainson, 1840; Gyrotoma curvata (Lea, 1843); Io modesta Lea, 1862; Io robusta Lea, 1862; Io spillmanii Lea, 1862; Melania altipeta Anthony, 1854; Melania arata Lea, 1843; Melania auriscalpium Menke, 1828; Melania canaliculata Say, 1821; Melania conica Say, 1821; Melania curvata Lea, 1843; Melania elevata Say, 1821; Melania elongata Lea, 1831; Melania exarata Menke, 1828; Melania exarata Lea, 1841; Melania excurata Conrad, 1834; Melania excurtata Hannibal, 1912; Melania excurvata Wheatley, 1845; Melania eximia Anthony, 1854; Melania fastigiata Anthony, 1854; Melania filum Lea, 1845; Melania incrassata Anthony, 1854; Melania infrafasciata Anthony, 1860; Melania iostoma Anthony, 1860; Melania ligata Menke, 1828; Melania lugubris Lea, 1845; Melania nigrostoma Reeve, 1861; Melania ordiana Lea, 1843; Melania ponderosa Anthony, 1860; Melania rorata Reeve, 1860; Melania sayi Deshayes, 1832; Melania spurca Lea, 1845; Melania undulata Say, 1829; Melania valida Anthony, 1860; Pleurocera affine (Lea, 1864); Pleurocera alabamense (Lea, 1862); Pleurocera altipetum (Anthony, 1854); Pleurocera canaliculata alabamensis (Lea, 1862); Pleurocera canaliculata excurata (Conrad, 1834); Pleurocera canaliculata filum (Lea, 1845); Pleurocera canaliculata undulata (Say, 1829); Pleurocera parkerii Tryon, 1873; Pleurocera quadrosa Rafinesque, 1831; Strombus sayi Wood, 1828; Trypanostoma affine Lea, 1864; Trypanostoma alabamense Lea, 1862; Trypanostoma christyi Lea, 1862; Trypanostoma cinctum Lea, 1864; Trypanostoma corneum Lea, 1864; Trypanostoma curtatum Lea, 1863; Trypanostoma florencense Lea, 1862; Trypanostoma florense Goodrich, 1940; Trypanostoma ligatum Lea, 1862; Trypanostoma minor Lea, 1862; Trypanostoma moniliferum Lea, 1862; Trypanostoma pybasii Lea, 1862; Trypanostoma rostellatum Lea, 1862; Trypanostoma simplex Lea, 1862; Trypanostoma subrobustum Lea, 1864; Trypanostoma thorntonii Lea, 1862; Trypanostoma thortonii Lea, 1862; Trypanostoma tuomeyi Lea, 1862; Trypanostoma viride Lea, 1862

= Pleurocera canaliculata =

Species of gastropod

Pleurocera canaliculata is a species of a freshwater snail with a gill and an operculum, an aquatic gastropod mollusk in the family Pleuroceridae, the hornsnails.

== Ecology ==
Parasites of Pleurocera canaliculata include trematodes Cotylaspis cokeri and Cotylogaster occidentalis.
