= Potamilus metnecktayi =

Conservation status
- Endangered (IUCN 2.3)

- Critically Imperiled (NatureServe)

Scientific classification
- Kingdom: Animalia
- Phylum: Mollusca
- Class: Bivalvia
- Order: Unionida
- Family: Unionidae
- Genus: Potamilus
- Species: P. metnecktayi

Binomial name
- Potamilus metnecktayi R. I. Johnson, 1998

Synonyms
- Lampsilis salinasensis (Simpson, 1908); Disconaias salinasensis

Species of bivalve

Potamilus metnecktayi, the Salina mucket, is a species of freshwater mussel, an aquatic bivalve mollusc in the family Unionidae, the river mussels.

This species is endemic to the United States.
