= Upland hornsnail =

Conservation status
- Vulnerable (IUCN 3.1)

- Imperiled (NatureServe)

Scientific classification
- Kingdom: Animalia
- Phylum: Mollusca
- Class: Gastropoda
- Subclass: Caenogastropoda
- Order: incertae sedis
- Family: Pleuroceridae
- Genus: Pleurocera
- Species: P. showalterii

Binomial name
- Pleurocera showalterii Lea, 1862

Synonyms
- Pleurocera showalteri (Lea, 1862); Trypanostoma moriforme Lea, 1862; Trypanostoma moriformi Lea, 1862; Trypanostoma showalterii Lea, 1862

Species of gastropod

The upland hornsnail, scientific name Pleurocera showalterii, is a species of freshwater snail with an operculum, an aquatic gastropod mollusc in the family Pleuroceridae. This species is endemic to Alabama and Georgia in the United States.
