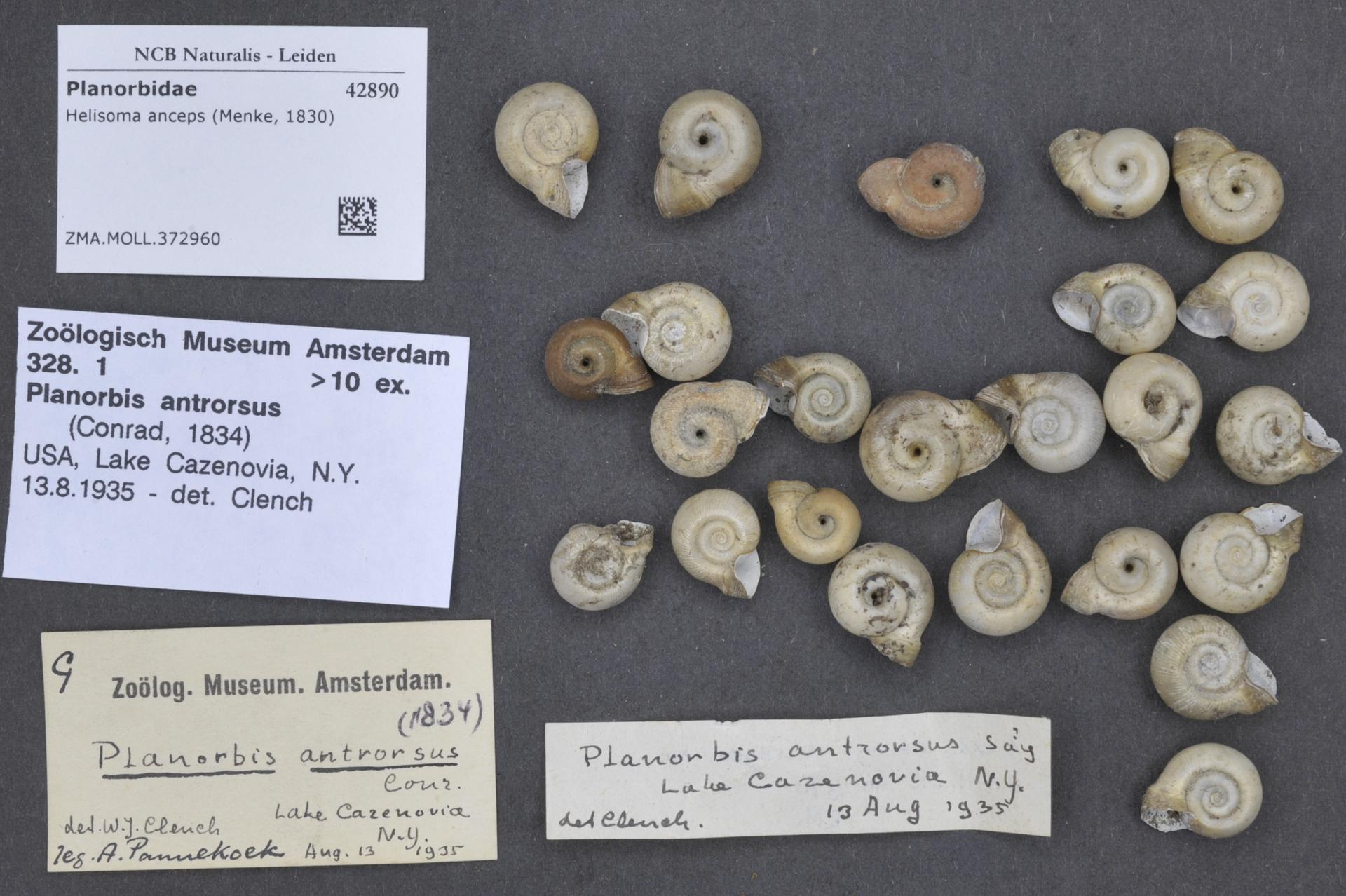
- Helisoma anceps

Scientific classification
- Kingdom: Animalia
- Phylum: Mollusca
- Class: Gastropoda
- Superorder: Hygrophila
- Family: Planorbidae
- Tribe: Helisomatini
- Genus: Helisoma; Swainson, 1840

Synonyms
- Carinifex W. G. Binney, 1864; Helisoma (Helisoma) Swainson, 1840; Planorbis (Carinifex) W. G. Binney, 1864; Planorbis (Helisoma) Swainson, 1840

= Helisoma =

Genus of gastropods

Helisoma is a genus of freshwater air-breathing snails, pulmonate gastropod mollusks in the family Planorbidae, the ram's horn snails.

Helisoma snails are an intermediate host of Megalodiscus temperatus.

== Species ==
The following species are recognised in the genus Helisoma:

- Helisoma anceps (Menke, 1830)
- †Helisoma brevispira (Yen, 1946)
- †Helisoma dongdawusuensis (G.-X. Zhu, 1976)
- Helisoma eucosmium (Bartsch, 1908)
- Helisoma eyerdami Clench & Aguayo, 1932
- †Helisoma kettlemanensis Pilsbry, 1934
- †Helisoma lincki (Schütze, 1907)
- †Helisoma llanerensis (K. van W. Palmer, 1945)
- †Helisoma malheurense (J. Henderson & Rodeck, 1934)
- †Helisoma marshalli (Arnold, 1909)
- Helisoma minus (J. G. Cooper, 1870)
- Helisoma newberryi (I. Lea, 1858)
- †Helisoma parallelum A. B. Leonard & Franzen, 1944
- †Helisoma paritis X.-H. Yu, 1987
- Helisoma peruvianum (Broderip, 1832)
- †Helisoma ringentis X.-H. Yu, 1987
- †Helisoma sanctaeclarae (Hannibal, 1909)
- †Helisoma sheyangensis H.-J. Wang, 1977
- †Helisoma shotwelli (D. W. Taylor, 1963)
- †Helisoma triangulatum Pierce, 2001
