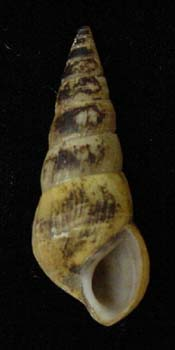
- Apertural view of a shell of Pleurocera acuta

Conservation status
- Least Concern (IUCN 3.1)

- Secure (NatureServe)

Scientific classification
- Kingdom: Animalia
- Phylum: Mollusca
- Class: Gastropoda
- Subclass: Caenogastropoda
- Order: incertae sedis
- Family: Pleuroceridae
- Genus: Pleurocera
- Species: P. acuta

Binomial name
- Pleurocera acuta Rafinesque, 1824

Synonyms
- List: Goniobasis alexandrensis (Lea, 1845); Goniobasis lawrencii Lea, 1869; Melania alexandrensis Lea, 1845; Melania alexandriensis Hannibal, 1912; Melania intensa Reeve, 1860; Melania livida Reeve, 1861; Melania neglecta Anthony, 1854; Melania subularis Lea, 1831; Melania tracta Gould, 1851; Melania varicosa Haldeman, 1841; Pleurocera acuta hinkleyi (Goodrich, 1921); Pleurocera acuta lewisii (Lea, 1862); Pleurocera acutum Rafinesque, 1824; Pleurocera hinkleyi Goodrich, 1921; Pleurocera lewisii (Lea, 1862); Pleurocera subulare (Lea, 1831); Pleurocerus acutus Rafinesque, 1824; Trypanostoma labiatum Lea, 1862; Trypanostoma lewisii Lea, 1862; Trypanostoma pallidum Lea, 1862

= Pleurocera acuta =

Species of gastropod

Pleurocera acuta, common name the sharp hornsnail, is a species of small freshwater snail with a gill and an operculum, an aquatic gastropod mollusk in the family Pleuroceridae, the hornsnails.

== Shell description ==
The shell can have up to 14 whorls. The shell of this species can be as long as 37 mm.

== Distribution ==
Pleurocera acuta is native to the United States. It occurs in the Ohio River and Great Lakes drainages; the Mississippi River west to Kansas and Nebraska.

This species is listed as threatened in some Midwestern states.

The nonindigenous distribution of Pleurocera acuta includes the Lower Hudson River drainage and Oneida Lake in New York State. It was introduced there, probably via the Erie Canal.

== Ecology ==
This species is found in freshwater rivers and streams where it burrows in sand and mud. Eggs are laid in the spring.
