= Ringed hornsnail =

Conservation status
- Vulnerable (IUCN 2.3)

- Vulnerable (NatureServe)

Scientific classification
- Kingdom: Animalia
- Phylum: Mollusca
- Class: Gastropoda
- Subclass: Caenogastropoda
- Order: incertae sedis
- Family: Pleuroceridae
- Genus: Pleurocera
- Species: P. annulifera

Binomial name
- Pleurocera annulifera (Conrad, 1834)

Synonyms
- Melania annulata Jay, 1836; Melania annulifera Conrad, 1834

Species of gastropod

The ringed hornsnail, scientific name Pleurocera annulifera, is a species of freshwater snail with an operculum, an aquatic gastropod mollusk in the family Pleuroceridae. This species is endemic to the United States.
