= Telescope hornsnail =

Conservation status
- Vulnerable (IUCN 2.3)

- Vulnerable (NatureServe)

Scientific classification
- Kingdom: Animalia
- Phylum: Mollusca
- Class: Gastropoda
- Subclass: Caenogastropoda
- Order: incertae sedis
- Family: Pleuroceridae
- Genus: Pleurocera
- Species: P. walkeri

Binomial name
- Pleurocera walkeri Goodrich, 1928

Species of gastropod

The telescope hornsnail, scientific name Pleurocera walkeri, is a species of freshwater snail in the family Pleuroceridae. This species is endemic to the Southeastern United States: it is known from Tennessee River system in Alabama, Kentucky, and Tennessee, and from several streams in Alabama and Georgia.
