= Green floater =

Conservation status
- Least Concern (IUCN 3.1)

- Imperiled (NatureServe)

Scientific classification
- Kingdom: Animalia
- Phylum: Mollusca
- Class: Bivalvia
- Order: Unionida
- Family: Unionidae
- Genus: Lasmigona
- Species: L. subviridis

Binomial name
- Lasmigona subviridis Conrad, 1835

Species of bivalve

The green floater (Lasmigona subviridis) is a species of freshwater mussel, an aquatic bivalve mollusk in the family Unionidae, the river mussels.

This species is endemic to the United States. It is found in West Virginia, Delaware, Maryland, Tennessee, North Carolina, Pennsylvania, New Jersey, Virginia and New York, and has been extirpated from Alabama and Georgia. Its populations in the Susquehanna River and the Potomac River are considered to be genetically distinct from the southern population. As of 2023, the species is under review for listing under the Endangered Species Act of 1973.

It is reported to be a simultaneous hermaphrodite under most conditions.
