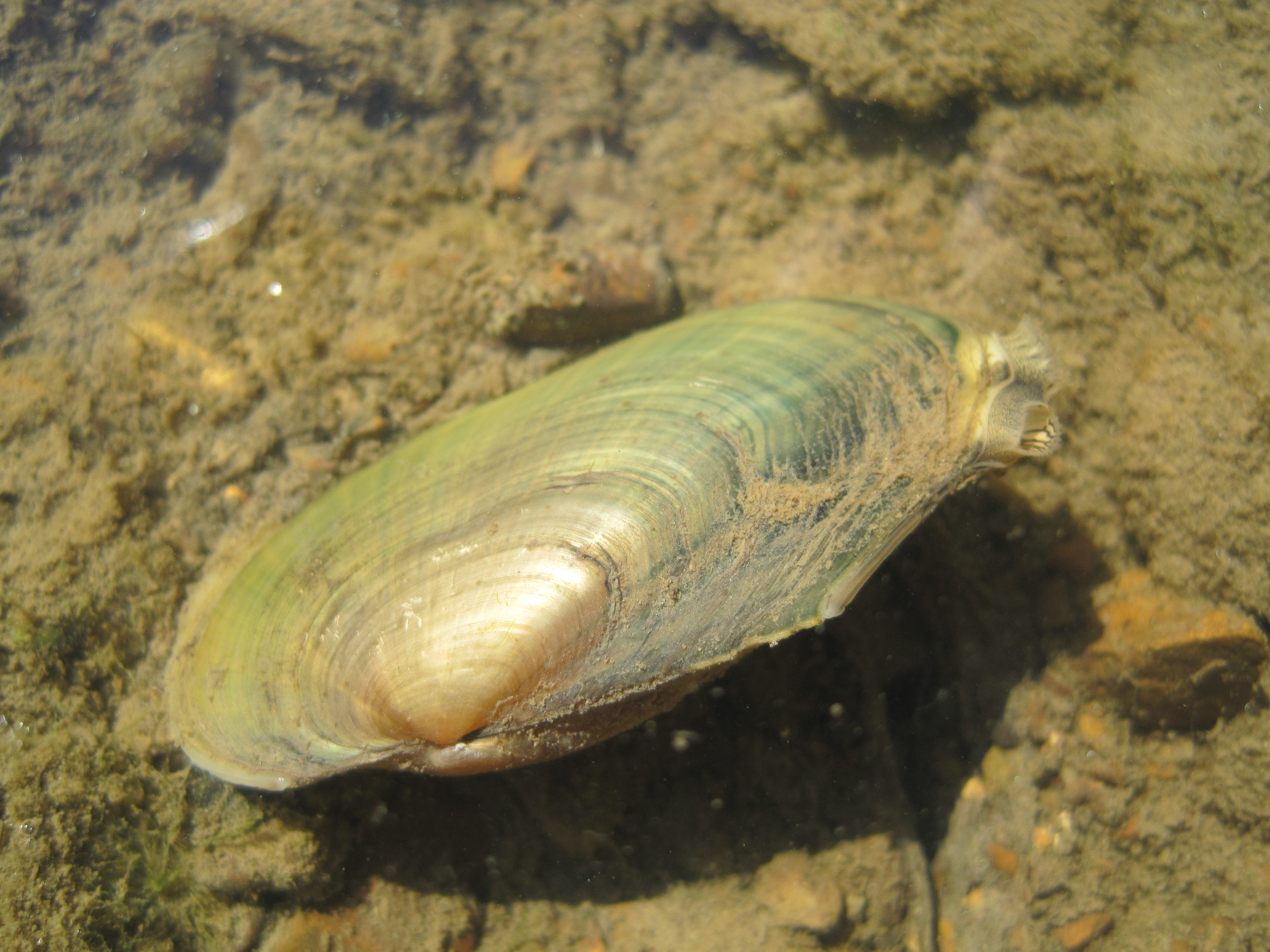

Conservation status
- Secure (NatureServe)

Scientific classification
- Kingdom: Animalia
- Phylum: Mollusca
- Class: Bivalvia
- Order: Unionida
- Family: Unionidae
- Genus: Potamilus
- Species: P. fragilis

Binomial name
- Potamilus fragilis (Rafinesque, 1820)

Synonyms
- Medionidus mcglameriae van der Schalie, 1939; Unio fragilis Rafinesque, 1820; Unio gracilis Barnes, 1823; Unio planus Barnes, 1823; Unio atrata Swainson, 1823; Lasmonos fragilis Rafinesque, 1831; Lampsilis simpsoni Ferriss, 1900; Unio fragilis subsp. fuscata Rafinesque, 1820; Lampsilis gracilis subsp. lacustris F.C. Baker, 1922

= Potamilus fragilis =

Species of bivalve

Potamilus fragilis, previously Leptodea fragilis, the fragile papershell, is a species of freshwater mussel, an aquatic bivalve mollusk in the family Unionidae, the river mussels. P. fragilis is one of the fastest-growing unionid species and the most abundant unionid species in Lake Erie. Its light-shelled morphology suggests an adaptation to deep water within lakes.

This species is found in the United States and Canada. Its natural habitats include streams, rivers and freshwater embayments.

A common host for the glochidia of this species is the freshwater drum (Aplodinotus grunniens).

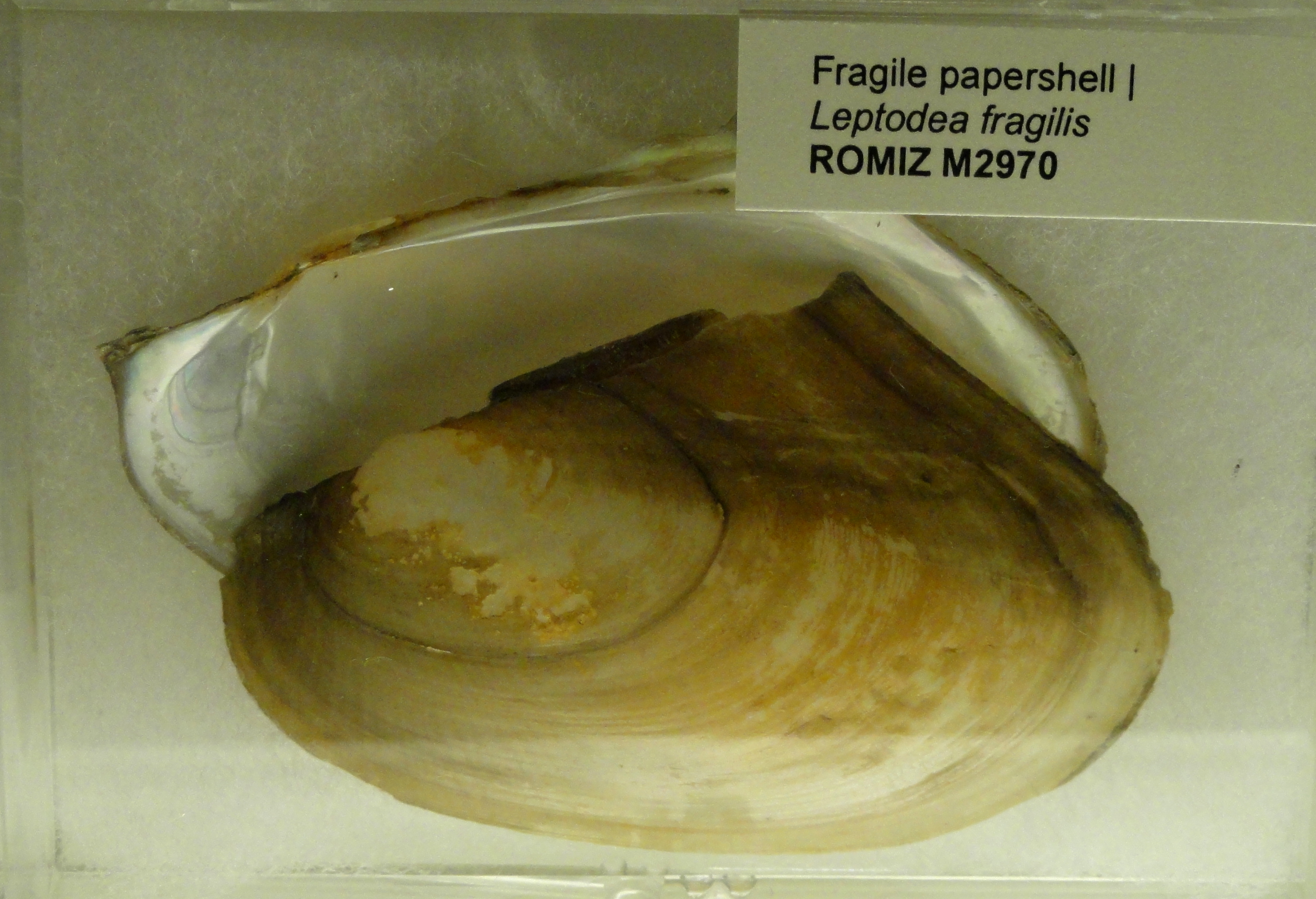
A museum specimen
