= Spiral hornsnail =

Conservation status
- Vulnerable (IUCN 2.3)

- Imperiled (NatureServe)

Scientific classification
- Kingdom: Animalia
- Phylum: Mollusca
- Class: Gastropoda
- Subclass: Caenogastropoda
- Order: incertae sedis
- Family: Pleuroceridae
- Genus: Pleurocera
- Species: P. brumbyi

Binomial name
- Pleurocera brumbyi (Lea, 1852)

Synonyms
- Melania brumbyi Lea, 1852; Pleurocera currierana (Lea, 1863); Trypanostoma currieranum Lea, 1863; Trypanostoma terebrale Lea, 1868

Species of gastropod

The spiral hornsnail, scientific name Pleurocera brumbyi, is a species of freshwater snail with an operculum, an aquatic gastropod mollusc in the family Pleuroceridae. This species is endemic to the United States.
