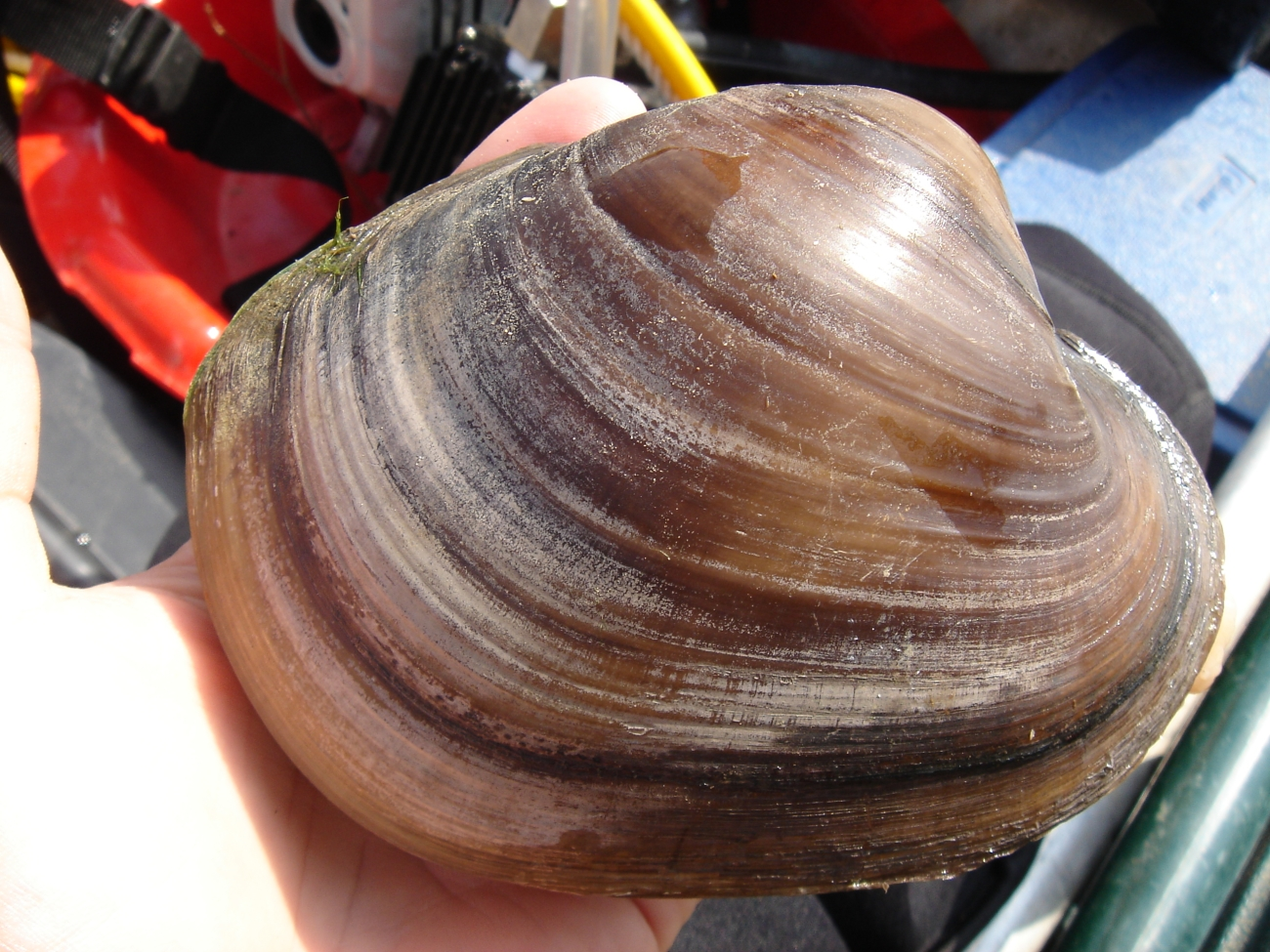

Conservation status
- Vulnerable (IUCN 3.1)
- CITES Appendix I

Scientific classification
- Kingdom: Animalia
- Phylum: Mollusca
- Class: Bivalvia
- Order: Unionida
- Family: Unionidae
- Genus: Potamilus
- Species: P. capax

Binomial name
- Potamilus capax (Green, 1832)

= Potamilus capax =

Species of bivalve

Potamilus capax, the fat pocketbook pearly mussel or fat pocketbook, is a species of freshwater mussel, an aquatic bivalve mollusk in the family Unionidae, the river mussels. It is a federally listed endangered species.

It occurs in the St. Francis, Ohio, and Mississippi River drainages in the United States. Threats to the species include habitat destruction and modification due to dams, channels, dredging, and pollutant spills. Since its listing under the Endangered Species Act in 1976, the fat pocketbook has significantly recovered, with multiple abundant, viable populations. In a 5-year review in 2019, the US Fish and Wildlife Service recommended delisting the species as recovered.
