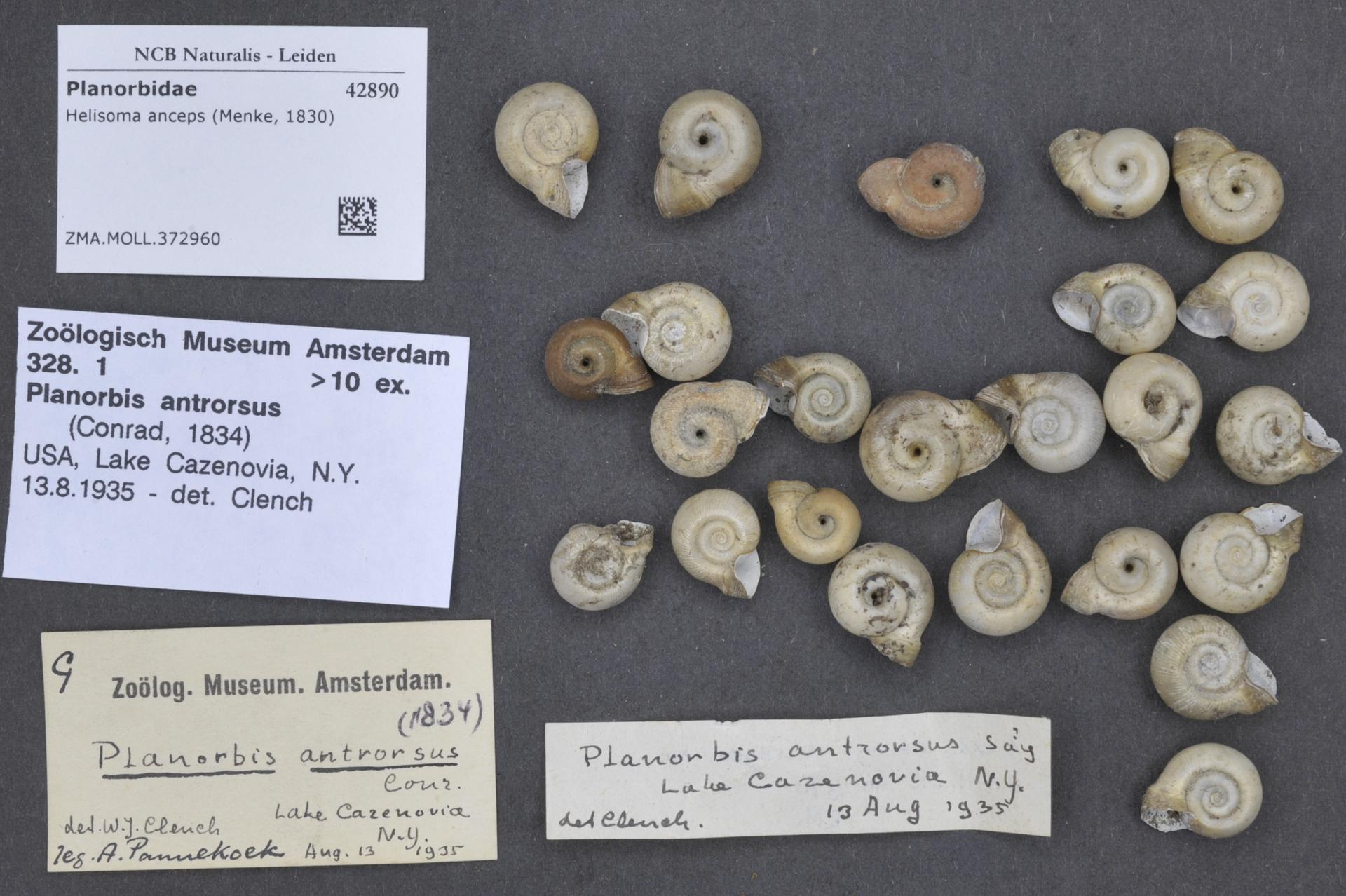
- Helisoma anceps Naturalis

Conservation status
- Least Concern (IUCN 3.1)

- Secure (NatureServe)

Scientific classification
- Kingdom: Animalia
- Phylum: Mollusca
- Class: Gastropoda
- Superorder: Hygrophila
- Family: Planorbidae
- Genus: Helisoma
- Species: H. anceps

Binomial name
- Helisoma anceps (Menke, 1830)

Synonyms
- Planorbella anceps (Menke, 1830)

= Helisoma anceps =

Species of gastropod

Helisoma anceps, common name the two-ridge rams-horn, is a species of air-breathing freshwater snail, a pulmonate gastropod mollusk in the family Planorbidae, the ram's horn snails.

== Distribution ==
This species is distributed from Mexico, through the Central United States, to central Canada.

It was introduced to Europe.

== See also ==
- List of non-marine molluscs of Mexico
- List of non-marine molluscs of the United States
- List of non-marine mollusks of the Indiana Dunes
