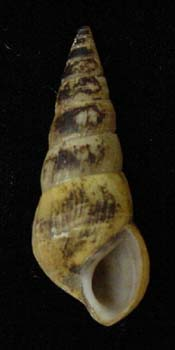
- Apertural view of a shell of Pleurocera acuta

Scientific classification
- Domain: Eukaryota
- Kingdom: Animalia
- Phylum: Mollusca
- Class: Gastropoda
- Subclass: Caenogastropoda
- Superfamily: Cerithioidea
- Family: Pleuroceridae
- Genus: Pleurocera; Rafinesque, 1818

Synonyms
- Ceriphasia Swainson, 1840; Cerithidea (Ceriphasia) Swainson, 1840; Oxytrema Rafinesque, 1819; Pleurocera (Strephobasis) I. Lea, 1861; Pleuroceras Cossmann, 1909; Pleurocerus; Strephobasis I. Lea, 1861; Strepoma Haldeman, 1864; Telescopella Gray, 1847; Trypanostoma I. Lea, 1862

= Pleurocera =

Genus of gastropods

Pleurocera is a genus of freshwater snails with an operculum, aquatic gastropod molluscs in the family Pleuroceridae.

Pleurocera is the type genus of that family.

== Distribution ==
All members of the genus Pleurocera are native to eastern North America.

== Description ==
All of the species in this genus have thick-walled high-spired shells, and some attain a length of over 4 cm (1.6 in). The shape of the shell is elongate-conic or cylindrical. The sculpture of the shell is often carinate or costate. The shell of larger species sometimes develops sculpturing and a small siphonal canal or siphonal notch at the base of the aperture.

Opercula are paucispiral and corneous, but may be vestigial in some species, not completely closing the aperture.

The soft parts of the animal usually have a gray or brown coloration, commonly speckled with orange. The similar genus Juga has a seminal receptacle, but Pleurocera has no seminal receptacle.

== Species ==
Species within the genus Pleurocera include:

- Pleurocera acuta Rafinesque, 1831 - sharp hornsnail, type species of the genus Pleurocera
- Pleurocera alveare Conrad, 1834 - rugged hornsnail
- Pleurocera annulifera Conrad, 1834 - ringed hornsnail
- Pleurocera attenuata (I. Lea, 1862)
- Pleurocera brumbyi I. Lea, 1852 - spiral hornsnail
- † Pleurocera burkevillensis Stenzel & F. E. Turner, 1944
- Pleurocera canaliculata (Say, 1821) - silty hornsnail
- Pleurocera corpulenta Anthony, 1854 - corpulent hornsnail
- Pleurocera foremani I. Lea, 1843 - rough hornsnail
- † Pleurocera gigantica Naranjo-García & Aguillón, 2019
- Pleurocera gradata (J. G. Anthony, 1854) - bottle hornsnail
- † Pleurocera guantouensis W. Yü, 1980
- † Pleurocera nicolayana (Hartt, 1870)
- Pleurocera nobilis (I. Lea, 1845) - noble hornsnail
- Pleurocera parva (I. Lea, 1862) - dainty hornsnail
- Pleurocera picta (I. Lea, 1841)
- Pleurocera postellii (I. Lea, 1862) - broken hornsnail
- Pleurocera prasinata (Conrad, 1834) - smooth hornsnail
- Pleurocera pyrenella Conrad, 1834 - skirted hornsnail
- Pleurocera showalterii I. Lea, 1862 - upland hornsnail
- Pleurocera striata (I. Lea, 1862) - striate hornsnail
- Pleurocera trochiformis (Conrad, 1834) - sulcate hornsnail
- Pleurocera uncialis (Haldeman, 1842) - pagoda hornsnail
- Pleurocera vestita (Conrad, 1834) - brook hornsnail
- Pleurocera viridula (J. G. Anthony, 1854)
- Pleurocera walkeri Goodrich, 1928 - telescope hornsnail
- † Pleurocera warrenana (Meek & Hayden, 1857)

Species brought into synonymy

- Pleurocera acutum Rafinesque, 1824: synonym of Pleurocera acuta
- Pleurocera bicinctum Tryon, 1866: synonym of Pleurocera picta
- Pleurocera conradi Tryon, 1865: synonym of Pleurocera pyrenella
- † Pleurocera costulatum Fuchs, 1870: synonym of †Goniochilus costulatus (Fuchs, 1870)
- Pleurocera currierana (I. Lea, 1863): synonym of Pleurocera brumbyi
- Pleurocera curta (Haldeman, 1841: synonym of Pleurocera picta
- Pleurocera hinkleyi Goodrich, 1921: synonym of Pleurocera acuta
- † Pleurocera kochii Fuchs, 1870: synonym of †Goniochilus kochii (Fuchs, 1870)
- † Pleurocera laeve T. Fuchs, 18701: synonym of †Micromelania laevis
- Pleurocera leaii Tryon, 1873: synonym of Pleurocera prasinata
- Pleurocera lewisii (I. Lea, 1862): synonym of Pleurocera acuta
- Pleurocera parkeri Tryon, 1873: synonym of Elimia viennaensis
- Pleurocera parkerii Tryon, 1873: synonym of Pleurocera canaliculata
- Pleurocera plicatum Tryon, 1863: synonym of Pleurocera alveare
- Pleurocera postelli (I. Lea, 1862): synonym of Pleurocera postellii
- Pleurocera quadrosa Rafinesque, 1831: synonym of Pleurocera canaliculata
- † Pleurocera radmanesti Fuchs, 1870: synonym of †Prososthenia radmanesti
- † Pleurocera scalariaeforme T. Fuchs, 1870: synonym of †Goniochilus scalariaeformis
- † Pleurocera schwabenaui T. Fuchs, 1870: synonym of †Goniochilus schwabenaui
- Pleurocera shenandoa Dillon, 2019: synonym of Elimia shenandoa
- Pleurocera showalteri: synonym of Pleurocera showalterii
- † Pleurocera spinosa (Deshayes, 1834): synonym of †Cerithium spinosum Bruguière, 1792
- † Pleurocera strombiforme (Schlotheim, 1820): synonym of †Paraglauconia strombiforme
- Pleurocera subulare (I. Lea, 1831): synonym of Pleurocera acuta
- † Pleurocera terebriformis (J. Morris, 1859): synonym of †Pachychilus terebriformis
- Pleurocera verrucosa Rafinesque, 1820: synonym of Lithasia verrucosa

Nomen nudum

- Pleurocera angulata Rafinesque, 1818
- Pleurocera coneola Rafinesque, 1818
- Pleurocera fasciata Rafinesque, 1818
- Pleurocera retusa Rafinesque, 1818
- Pleurocera saxatilis Rafinesque, 1818
- Pleurocera turricula Rafinesque, 1818

Pleurocera gonula Rafinesque, 1831 (nomen dubium)

== Ecology ==
Most species inhabit larger rivers.

Pleurocera snails are dioecious.
