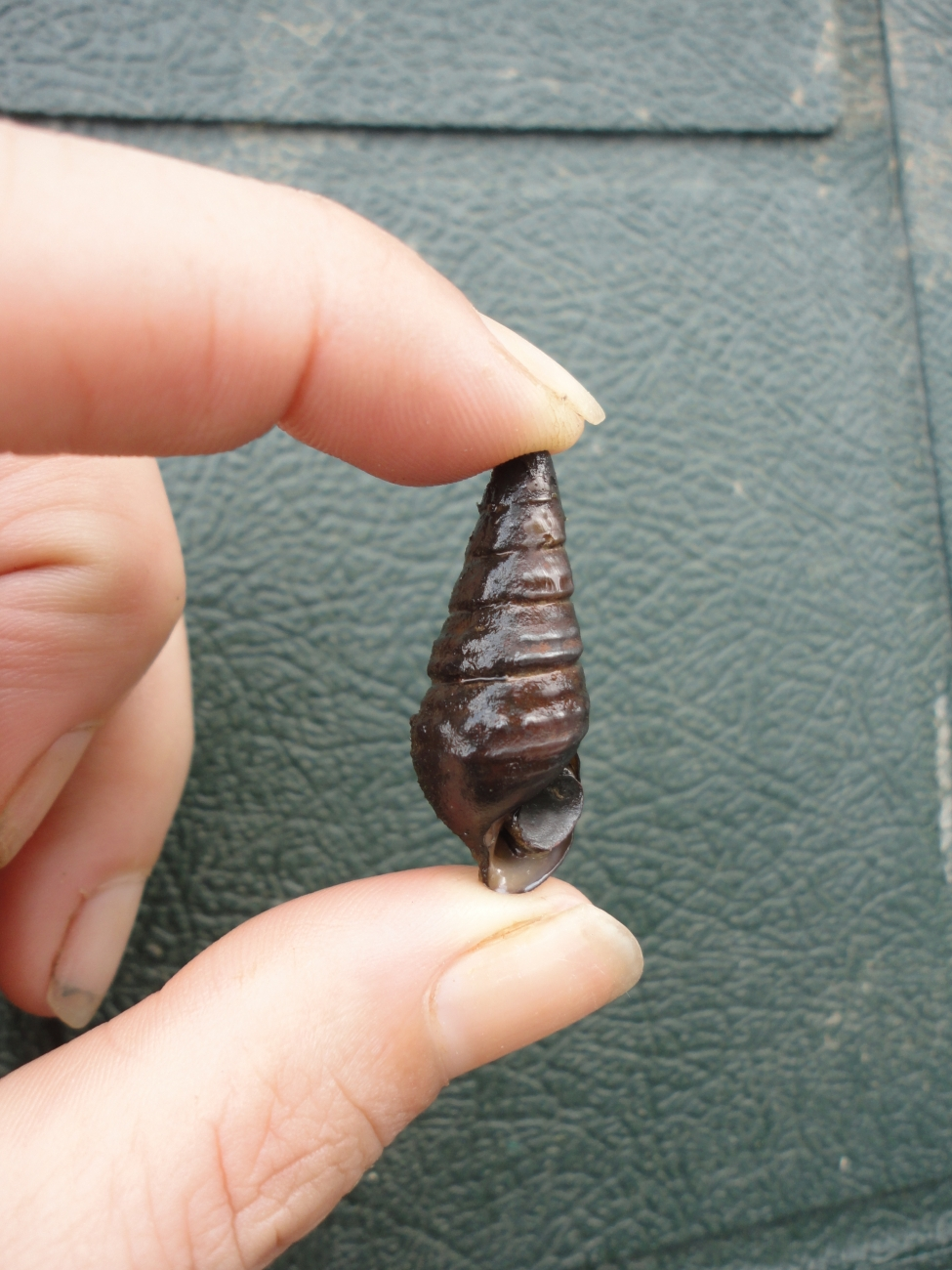

Conservation status
- Endangered (IUCN 3.1)

- Critically Imperiled (NatureServe)

Scientific classification
- Kingdom: Animalia
- Phylum: Mollusca
- Class: Gastropoda
- Subclass: Caenogastropoda
- Order: incertae sedis
- Family: Pleuroceridae
- Genus: Pleurocera
- Species: P. foremani

Binomial name
- Pleurocera foremani (Lea, 1843)

Synonyms
- Melania foremani Lea, 1843

= Rough hornsnail =

Species of gastropod

The rough hornsnail, scientific name Pleurocera foremani, is a rare species of freshwater snail with an operculum, an aquatic gastropod mollusc in the family Pleuroceridae.

== Distribution and habitat ==
This species is endemic to Alabama in the United States, where it is found only in the Coosa River system. It was federally listed as an endangered species of the United States in 2010.

This aquatic snail is found in flowing rivers on substrates of rock, gravel, and mud. Little is known about its life history.

This snail is known to exist at only two locations today: Lower Yellowleaf Creek in Shelby County, Alabama, and a section of the Coosa River in Elmore County.

The main reason for the rarity of this species is the alteration of its habitat, primarily by the impoundment of the river by dams to provide hydroelectric power. This fragmented the river, altered its flow, reduced oxygen levels in the water, increased sedimentation, and changed the flood regime of the system.

== Description ==
This gastropod has a thick, tapering, yellow-brown pyramidal shell that is up to 3.3 centimeters in length. The shell has two rows of tubercles above the aperture.
