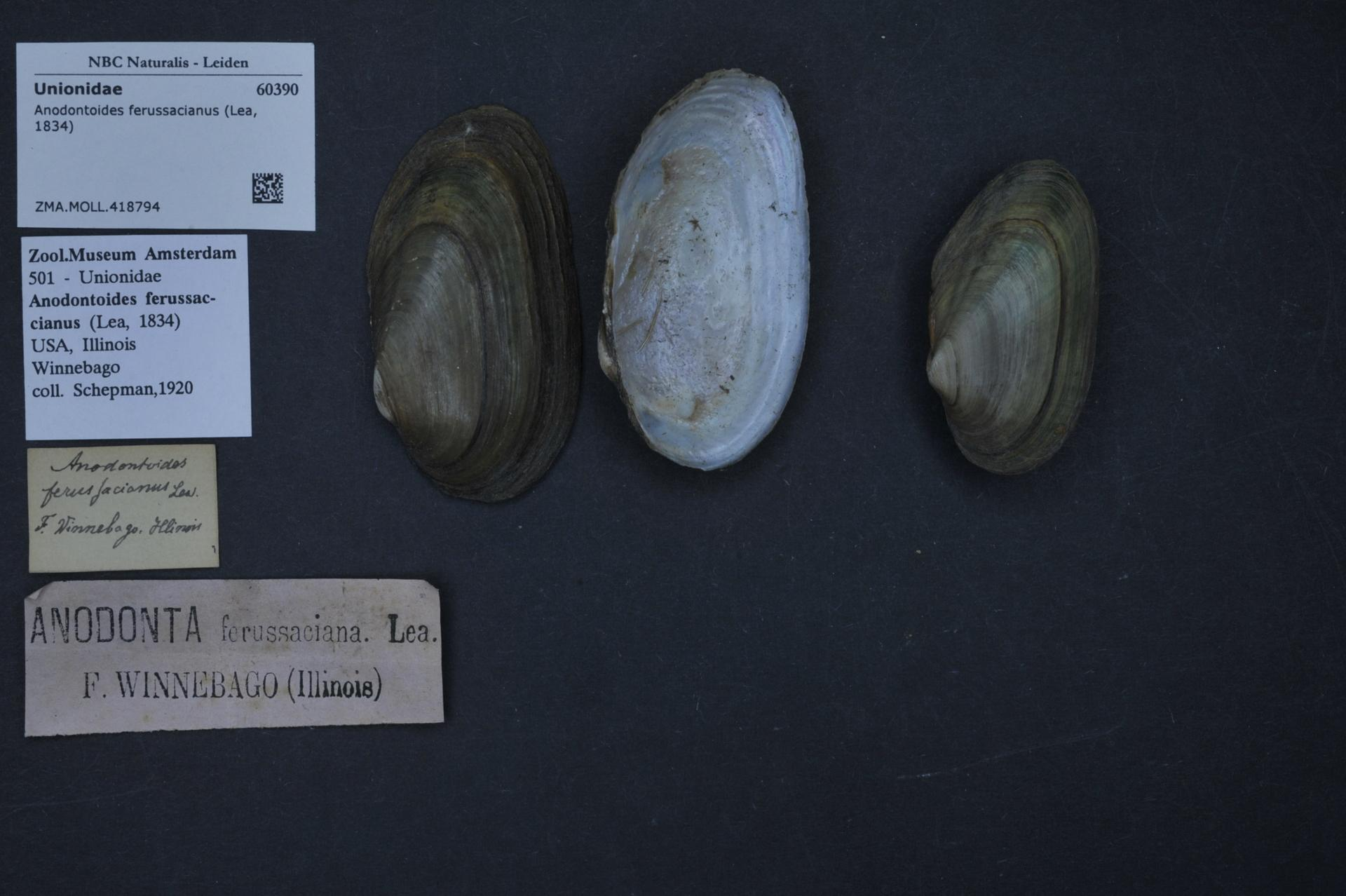
- Anodontoides ferussacianus

Scientific classification
- Kingdom: Animalia
- Phylum: Mollusca
- Class: Bivalvia
- Order: Unionida
- Family: Unionidae
- Tribe: Anodontini
- Genus: Anodontoides; Simpson in F.C. Baker, 1898

= Anodontoides =

Genus of bivalves

Anodontoides is a genus of freshwater mussels found in North America. It is an aquatic bivalve mollusk in the family Unionidae, the river mussels.

== Phylogeny ==
Species within the genus Anodontoides:

- Anodontoides denigratus (Lea, 1852)
- Anodontoides ferussacianus (I. Lea, 1834) — Found in creeks and small rivers usually with high concentrations of mud and sand.

Anodontoides radiatus (Conrad, 1834) has been reclassified as a member of genus Strophitus by Smith, Johnson, Pfeiffer and Gangloff (2018).

== Geographical range ==
Andontoides ferussacianus, the cylindrical papershell, can be found in the Mississippi River, St. Lawrence River and Great Lakes in shallow freshwater. They are found as far south as Tennessee and Arkansas, west to Colorado, and north to Manitoba. Anodontides radiatus has been found in the Gulf of Mexico drainages and parts of western Florida and southern Louisiana.

Anodontoides denigratus or Anodontoides denigrata, the Cumberland papershell, is restricted to the upper Cumberland River basin in Kentucky and Tennessee and is designated as "critically imperiled" by NatureServe.

== Reproduction ==
Common hosts of glochidia from Anodontoides ferussacianus have been identified as mottled sculpins, sea lampreys, brook sticklebacks, white suckers, Iowa darters, common shiners, blacknose shiners, bluntnose minnows, fathead minnow, black crappie, bluegill, largemouth bass and the Tippecanoe darter.

== Longevity ==
Anodontoides ferussacianus- Life expectancy varies from 3 to 16 years with an average of 9 years.
