= Cladorchiidae =

Scientific classification
- Kingdom: Animalia
- Phylum: Platyhelminthes
- Class: Trematoda
- Order: Plagiorchiida
- Suborder: Pronocephalata
- Superfamily: Paramphistomoidea
- Family: Cladorchiidae; Fischoeder, 1901

Family of flukes

Cladorchiidae is a family of trematodes belonging to the order Plagiorchiida.

== Genera ==
Genera:

- Allassostoma Stunkard, 1916
- Allassostomoides Stunkard, 1924
- Alphamphistoma Thatcher & Jégu, 1996
