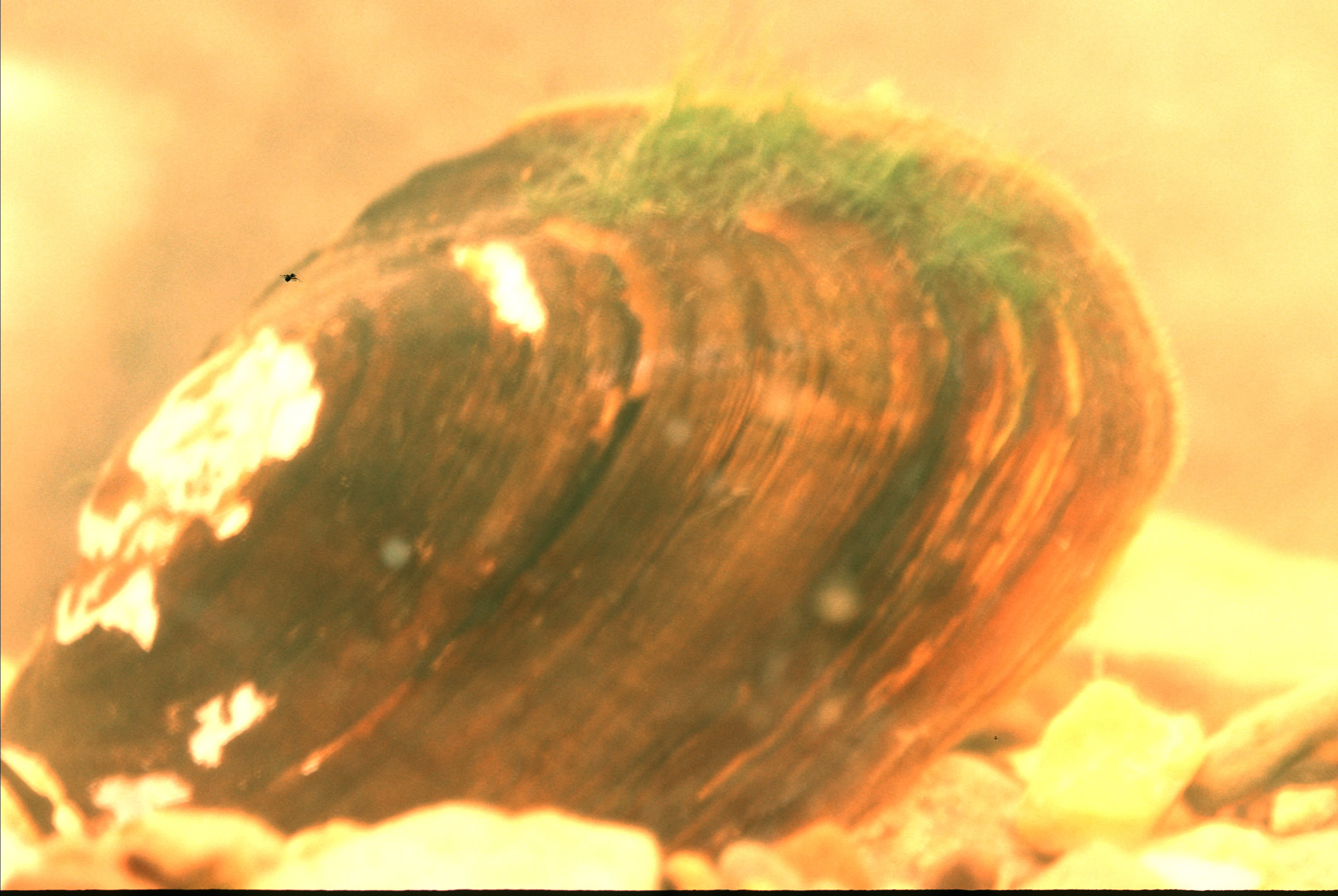

Conservation status
- Critically Endangered (IUCN 2.3)

- Endangered (ESA)

Scientific classification
- Kingdom: Animalia
- Phylum: Mollusca
- Class: Bivalvia
- Order: Unionida
- Family: Unionidae
- Genus: Lasmigona
- Species: L. decorata

Binomial name
- Lasmigona decorata (I. Lea, 1852)

Synonyms
- Unio decoratus Lea, 1852; Unio charlottensis Lea, 1863; Unio insolidus Lea, 1872

= Carolina heelsplitter =

Species of bivalve

The Carolina heelsplitter (Lasmigona decorata) is a species of freshwater mussel, an aquatic bivalve mollusk in the family Unionidae. It is named the "Carolina heelsplitter" because the sharp edge of the valves protrudes from the substrate and could cut the foot of someone walking on the river or stream bed. This species is endemic to the United States and is found in only North Carolina and South Carolina.

This species' current status is classified as "critically endangered". The IUCN Red List website states that to be considered critically endangered, the species must face an extremely high risk of becoming extinct in the wild in the immediate future.

== Description ==
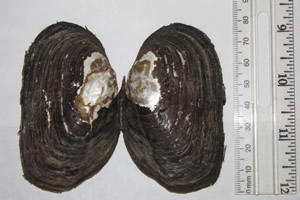
shell of Lasmigona decorata

The first recorded encounter with the Carolina heelsplitter was in 1852 by Isaac Lea. He described this new creature as Unio decoratus. The largest recorded specimen was about 5 in (130 mm) long.

This freshwater mussel has a greenish-brown to dark brown outer shell; the inner shell usually has nacre that is pearly white or bluish-white, although it can be pale orange in older specimens. The younger individuals tend to have faint black or greenish-brown rays on the outer surface of the shell.

This medium-sized mussel has well-developed, but thin, lateral teeth that are somewhat delicate. The Carolina heelsplitter also has two blade-like pseudocardinal teeth in the left valve, and one in the right valve.

With an "ovate, trapezoid-shaped, unsculptured shell", the size of the largest Carolina heelsplitter is about 4.6 inches (12 cm) in length and 1.56 inches (4.0 cm) in width, with a thickness of 2.7 inches (6.9 cm).

== Endangered Species Act and recovery plan ==
This species was determined to be endangered on June 30, 1993. The reasons stated were: Present or threatened destruction, modification, or curtailment of its habitat or range, over-utilization for commercial, recreational, scientific, or educational purposes, disease or predation, the inadequacy of existing regulatory mechanisms, and other natural or manmade factors affecting its continued existence. A review of the species and how it has been recovering has since been conducted, dated July 28, 2006.

The original recovery plan for the species was written by John A. Fridell and recognized in January 1997. The major points were using government regulations to protect the species, creating educational opportunities, continuing to search for new populations, establishing six viable populations, and alleviating major threats to the species, with the final objective being to get the species delisted.

When the recovery plan was written, only four populations of Lasmigona decorata were known. The original report stated that the populations appeared to have extremely restricted distribution and that much of the habitat in the species historic range (Catawba, Pee Dee, Saluda, and Savannah River systems) is now unsuitable for the reintroduction of the species. The recovery plan also stated that the species was extensively established enough that the population could not be completely wiped out by one major event involving its habitat.

== Reproduction ==
The reproductive cycle begins when a male Carolina heelsplitter releases his sperm into the stream. Soon afterward, the sperm is taken in by the females, in a process called siphoning. The female's eggs, which are carried in the female's gills, are then fertilized. The Carolina heelsplitter is a bradytichtic species, brooding fertilized eggs over the winter after spawning. When the glochidia (larvae) are fully developed the next year, the female mussel releases them into the water. The larvae must attach themselves quickly to a body part of their host fish, which is not harmed in the process. Host species for this mussel include members of the Cyprinidae.

Attached to the fish, the heelsplitters receive oxygen and other needs from the host for several weeks. When they have grown into fully developed juvenile mussels, they release themselves from the fish and settle into the stream or river. A fish host is very important to all mussels, not only because it provides the young with food and oxygen, but also because it serves as a mode of transportation. The transportation of the mussels is key when attempting to create new populations in streams and river banks. Thus, this creature can seed the fresh waters and have more larvae.

== Location and distribution ==
The Carolina heelsplitter lives in shallow streams and rivers, and occasionally, ponds. They can usually be found in mud or mixed sediments, usually along stable stream banks, but have also been found in the middle of a waterway. The water must not carry much sediment.

Historically, the Carolina heelsplitter was known to be found in the Catawba River and Pee Dee River systems in North Carolina, and the Pee Dee and Savannah River systems of South Carolina. These mussels historically lived possibly in the Saluda River systems in South Carolina.

Currently, 10 known populations (prior to the 2007–2008 drought) occur in North and South Carolina. The areas include Goose Creek and Flat Creek in the Pee Dee River system, Waxhaw Creek, Sixmile Creek, Gills Creek, Fishing Creek, and Bull Run Creek in the Catawba River system, and Red Bank Creek, Turkey Creek, and Cuffytown Creek in the Saluda River system.

The numbers of individuals in every population is very small:

- One to 17 individuals were found in eight of the known populations, with only one to five individuals being found in four of these eight populations.
- In only one population, 26 individuals were found
- The largest population included only 42 individuals.

The numbers that the surveyors found also indicate that the species is in decline, and also that none of the populations has improved over time. The populations are very highly fragmented and isolated, and they have also only been found in short stream reaches of each other.

Many combined influences are connected to the decline and endangerment of the Lasmigona decorata populations. The biggest reasons for their critical endangerment are sedimentation and stream pollution, road construction and maintenance, runoff, mining, and several other human-generated problems.

== Threats and reasons for endangerment ==
=== Population size ===
One of the main reasons that the Carolina heelsplitter has such a high risk of going extinct is its population size. Currently, the number of individuals in each population is low, and are distant from one another, such that they have little opportunity to mingle genes. This may mean not enough genetic material is available for them to be able to adapt properly to natural and manmade challenges.

=== Water pollution ===
Clean and unpolluted water is very important to the Carolina heelsplitters. Chemical water pollution can be the most serious threat. This can include runoff, dumping trash or chemicals into the stream and rivers, and other sources. Mussel larvae and juveniles are extremely sensitive to high levels of copper and ammonia, but seem to tolerate slightly higher levels of chlorine. The most elevated levels of ammonia were found at the stations at Goose Creek, as were the highest chlorine and copper levels. The research group thought that the higher levels of copper were due to more suspended sediment because of a recent rain downpour.

=== Habitat degradation ===
The Carolina heelsplitter is now found in shallow streams and rivers ranging from about 1–4 ft (0.30–1.22 m) deep. The water has to be clear, without culverts, dams, or other obstructions in the flow of the river. The rivers must have high oxygen content with microscopic organisms and plants on which to feed.

These mussels need to live near very stable river or stream banks. Crumbling banks not only take away home territory for this group of mussels, but a stable stream bank system also means that many plants and trees live near the stream banks and hold the soil and sediment in place with their roots. Any rise of silt or sediments in the rushing water can have a detrimental effect on the species and too much sediment can smother and kill the mussels.

Human development, such as bridges, on or near the rivers, greatly disturbs the delicate balance of the carried sediment in the water. The vegetation along the river and stream sides also helps regulate the water's temperature during the long and hot summers. It also provides decaying leaves and plants that are an essential part to the survival of all organisms living in the water. Both expansion and development greatly affect the Carolina heelsplitter, as it does most species. Such human interventions as channelization, impoundments. and stream dredging harm the species by directly destroying its habitat.
