= Potamilus amphichaenus =

Conservation status
- Endangered (IUCN 2.3)

- Imperiled (NatureServe)

Scientific classification
- Kingdom: Animalia
- Phylum: Mollusca
- Class: Bivalvia
- Order: Unionida
- Family: Unionidae
- Genus: Potamilus
- Species: P. amphichaenus

Binomial name
- Potamilus amphichaenus (Frierson, 1898)

Species of bivalve

Potamilus amphichaenus, the Texas heelsplitter, is a species of freshwater mussel, an aquatic bivalve mollusk in the family Unionidae, the river mussels. Freshwater drum (Aplodinotus grunniens) were confirmed as the host fish species for the glochidia reproductive stage of the Texas heelsplitter.

This species is endemic to the United States.

== See also ==
- U.S. Fish & Wildlife Service, Texas Heelsplitter
- U.S. Fish & Wildlife Service, ECOS Environmental Conservation Online System, Texas heelsplitter (Potamilus amphichaenus)
