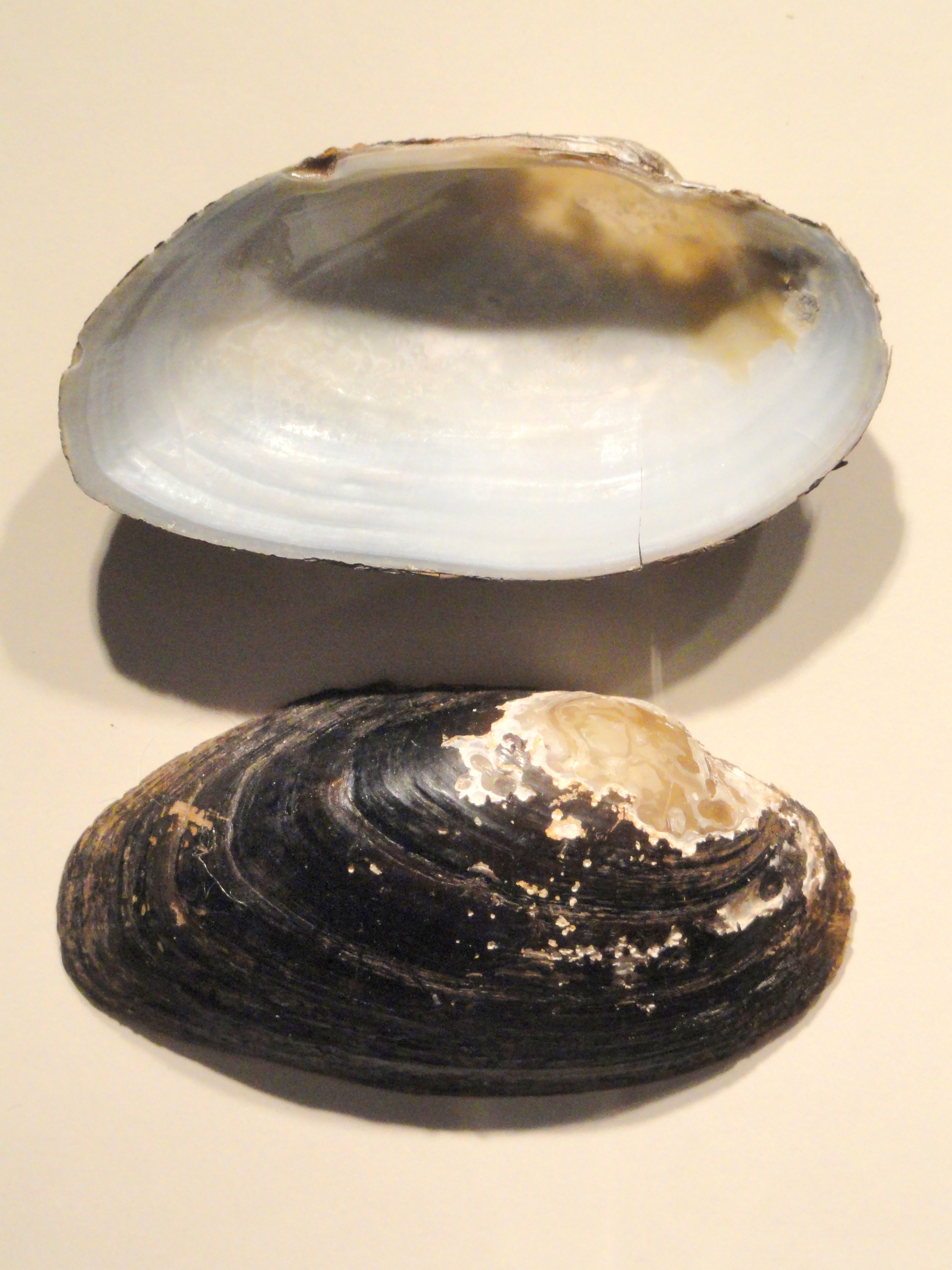

Conservation status
- Secure (NatureServe)

Scientific classification
- Kingdom: Animalia
- Phylum: Mollusca
- Class: Bivalvia
- Order: Unionida
- Family: Unionidae
- Genus: Strophitus
- Species: S. undulatus

Binomial name
- Strophitus undulatus (Say, 1817)

Synonyms
- List: Strophitus undulatus subsp. undulatus (Say, 1817); Strophitus undulatus subsp. tennesseensis Frierson, 1927; Anodonta undulata Say, 1817; Anodonta pensylvanica Lamarck, 1819; Anodon rugosus Swainson, 1822; Alasmodonta edentula Say, 1829; Anodon areolatus Swainson, 1829; Anodonta virgata Conrad, 1836; Anodonta wardiana Lea, 1838; Anodonta pavonia Lea, 1838; Anodon unadilla DeKay, 1843; Anodonta tetragona Lea, 1845; Anodonta arkansensis Lea, 1852; Anodonta shaefferiana Lea, 1852; Alasmodon rhombica J.G. Anthony, 1865; Anodon papyracea J.G. Anthony, 1865; Anodon annulatus Sowerby, 1867; Anodon quadriplicatus Sowerby, 1870; Strophitus undulatus subsp. ovatus Frierson, 1927; Strophitus rugosus subsp. pepinensis F.C. Baker, 1928; Strophitus rugosus subsp. winnebagoensis F.C. Baker, 1928; Strophitus rugosus subsp. lacustris F.C. Baker, 1928

= Strophitus undulatus =

Species of bivalve

Strophitus undulatus is a species of mussel in the Unionidae, the river mussels. It is native to eastern Canada and the eastern United States. Its common names include creeper, squawfoot, sloughfoot, and strange floater.

This mussel has a somewhat flattened, smooth, oval shell which is thin in young animals and becomes thicker with age. It is green, brown, or black in color with pink to orange nacre. It grows up to 10.2 centimetres (4.0 in) long. The beak is ridged.

This species lives in a variety of freshwater habitat types, including rivers, streams, ponds, and lakes. It tolerates still water and low to moderate flow gradients, but usually not high flow areas. It lives in mud, sand, and gravel substrates.

Like other freshwater mussels, this species releases larvae called glochidia, which must attach parasitically to a host organism, generally a fish, so they can develop into free-living juveniles. Some mussels release their glochidia inside a spongy, sticky mass called a conglutinate. The conglutinate sometimes resembles a prey item, such as a worm, which attracts the fish. When the fish bumps the conglutinate, it breaks apart and releases the glochidia, which attach to the fish. S. undulatus produces an interesting kind of conglutinate. It is whitish and rod-shaped, up to 7 millimeters long and contains around 12 glochidia. The glochidia of this species are larger than those of most other mussels, measuring up to almost 500 micrometers. The conglutinate moves by itself, making a pulsing motion. This may be caused by the swelling of the structure when it contacts the water. The motion helps to squeeze out the glochidia and it may help to attract fish hosts. Sometimes one of the glochidia will attach to a host while remaining attached to the conglutinate; in this case, the other glochidia in the structure may be dragged along with it and have an easier opportunity to parasitize the host.

This mussel uses a wide variety of organisms as hosts, especially fish. It has been observed on black bullhead (Ameiurus melas), largemouth bass (Micropterus salmoides), green sunfish (Lepomis cyanellus), yellow perch (Perca flavescens), fathead minnow (Pimephales promelas), spotfin shiner (Cyprinella spiloptera), walleye (Stizostedion vitreum), bluegill (Lepomis macrochirus), longnose dace (Rhinichthys cataractae), fallfish (Semotilus corporalis), golden shiner (Notemigonus crysoleucas), slimy sculpin (Cottus cognatus), and many others. It can also use amphibians as hosts, such as the larva of the northern two-lined salamander (Eurycea bislineata), and red-spotted newt (Notophthalmus viridescens). It has been noted to parasitize species not native to the ecosystem, as well as an anadromous species. The glochidia of this mussel may very occasionally be able to develop without attaching to a host species.

This mussel has a wide range in North America, and while its populations are stable in most areas, it may have been extirpated from the North Fork Holston River in Virginia. It is designated as state threatened in Iowa.
