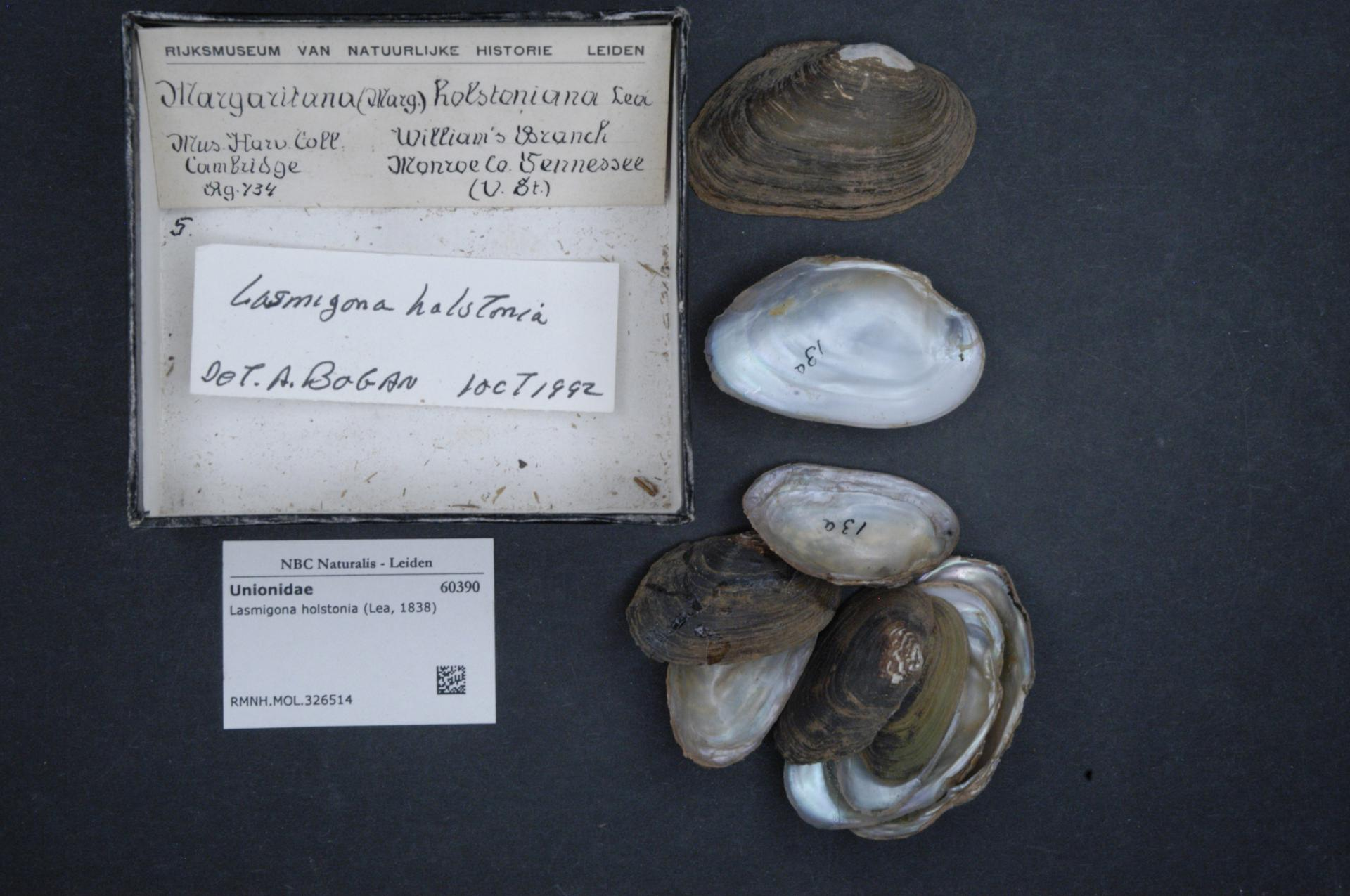

Conservation status
- Least Concern (IUCN 3.1)

- Vulnerable (NatureServe)

Scientific classification
- Kingdom: Animalia
- Phylum: Mollusca
- Class: Bivalvia
- Order: Unionida
- Family: Unionidae
- Genus: Lasmigona
- Species: L. holstonia

Binomial name
- Lasmigona holstonia I. Lea, 1838

= Lasmigona holstonia =

Species of bivalve

Lasmigona holstonia, the Tennessee heelsplitter, is a species of freshwater mussel, an aquatic bivalve mollusk in the family Unionidae.

This species is endemic to the United States.
