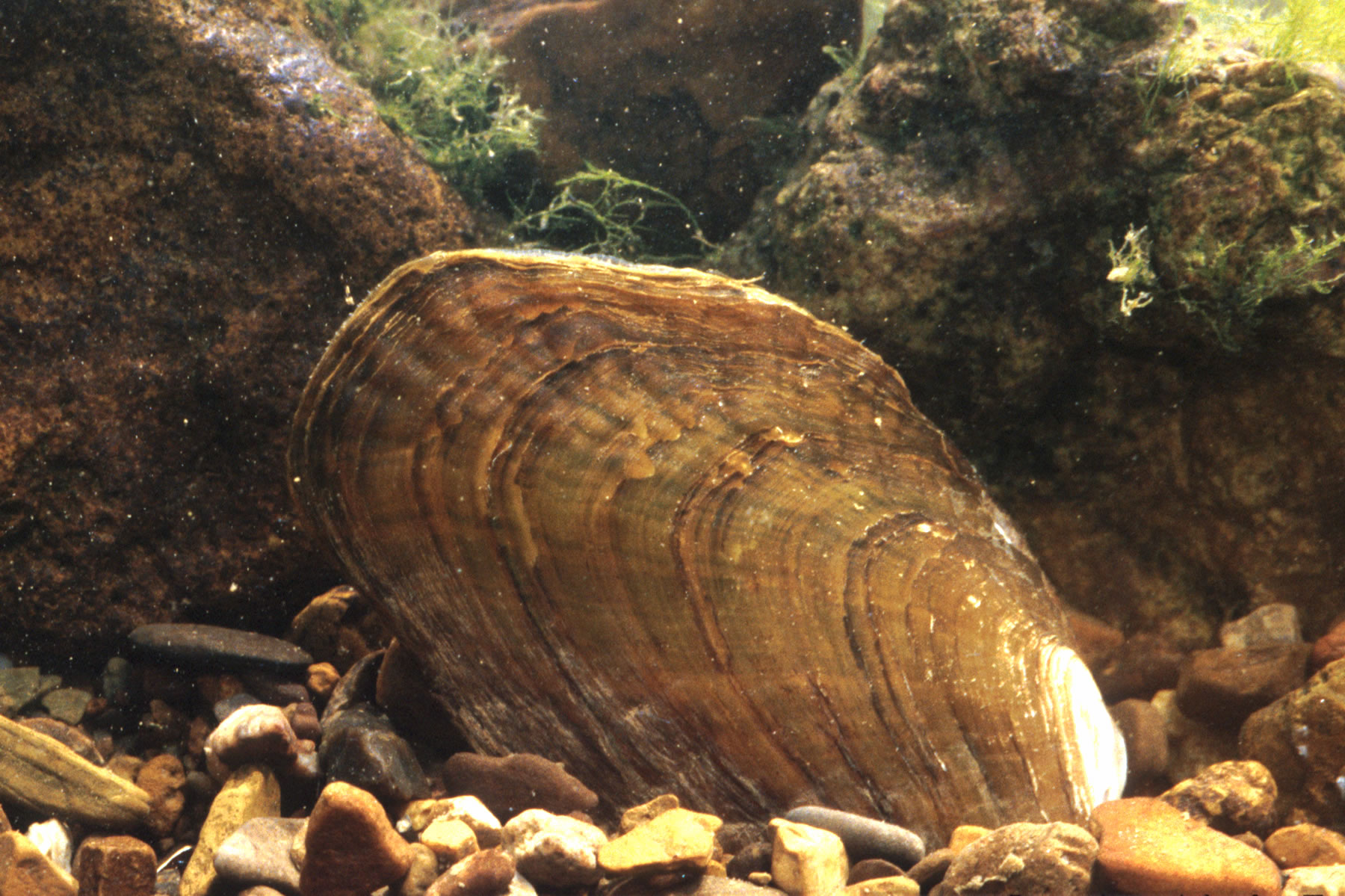

Conservation status
- Secure (NatureServe)

Scientific classification
- Kingdom: Animalia
- Phylum: Mollusca
- Class: Bivalvia
- Order: Unionida
- Family: Unionidae
- Genus: Lasmigona
- Species: L. costata

Binomial name
- Lasmigona costata (Rafinesque, 1820)

= Lasmigona costata =

Species of bivalve

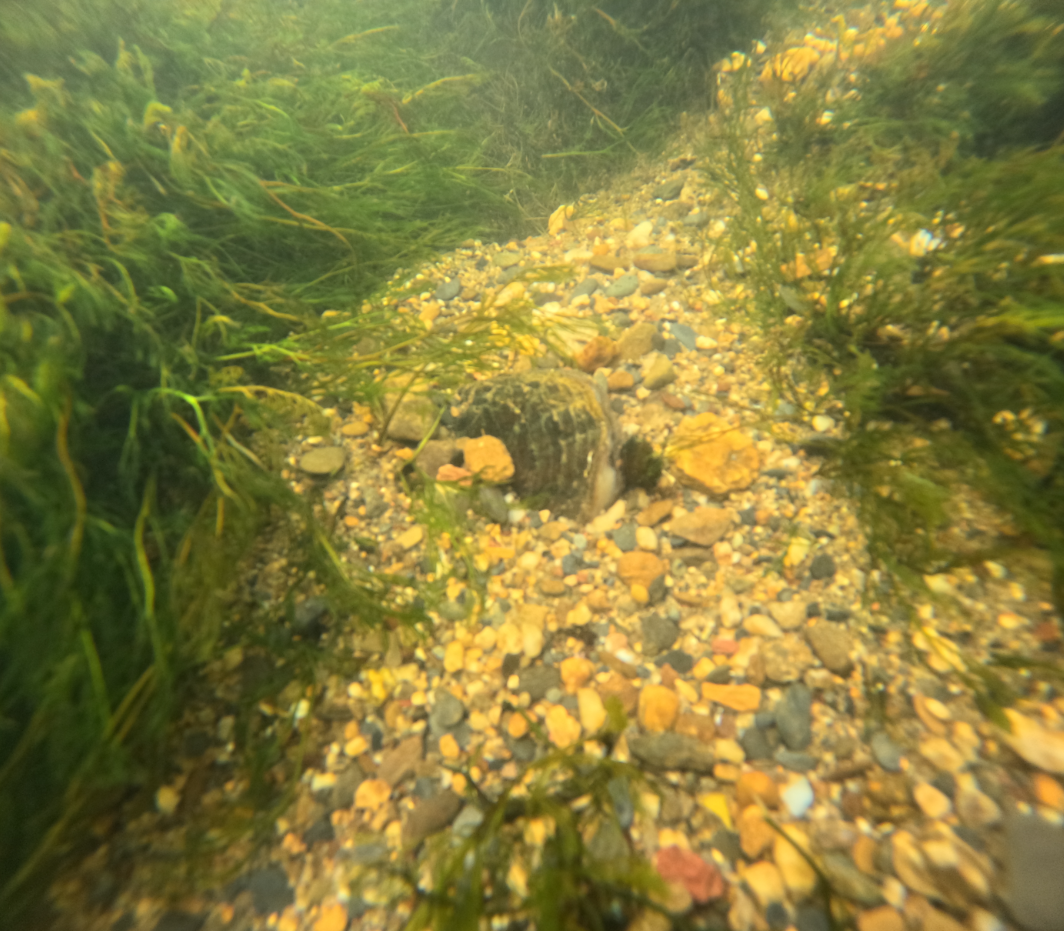
A flutedshell (Lasmigona costata) siphons water in the West Prong of the Little Pigeon River in Sevierville, Tennessee, in the United States, removing algae and other particles from the water column.

Lasmigona costata, the flutedshell, is a species of freshwater mussel. It is an aquatic bivalve mollusk in the family Unionidae.
