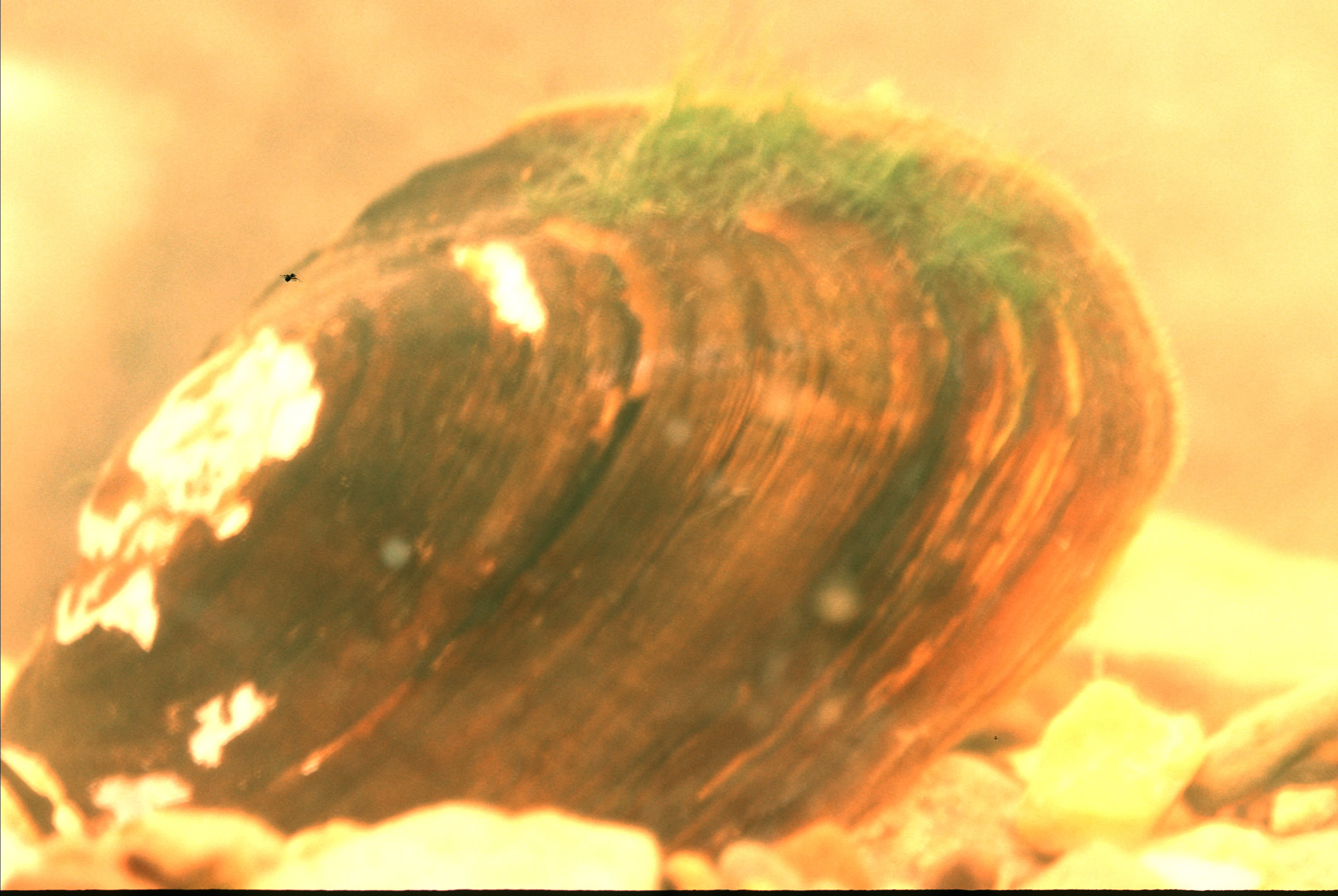
- Lasmigona decorata

Scientific classification
- Kingdom: Animalia
- Phylum: Mollusca
- Class: Bivalvia
- Order: Unionida
- Family: Unionidae
- Tribe: Anodontini
- Genus: Lasmigona; Rafinesque, 1831

= Lasmigona =

Genus of bivalves

Lasmigona is a genus of freshwater mussels, aquatic bivalve mollusks in the family Unionidae.

== Species within the genus Lasmigona ==
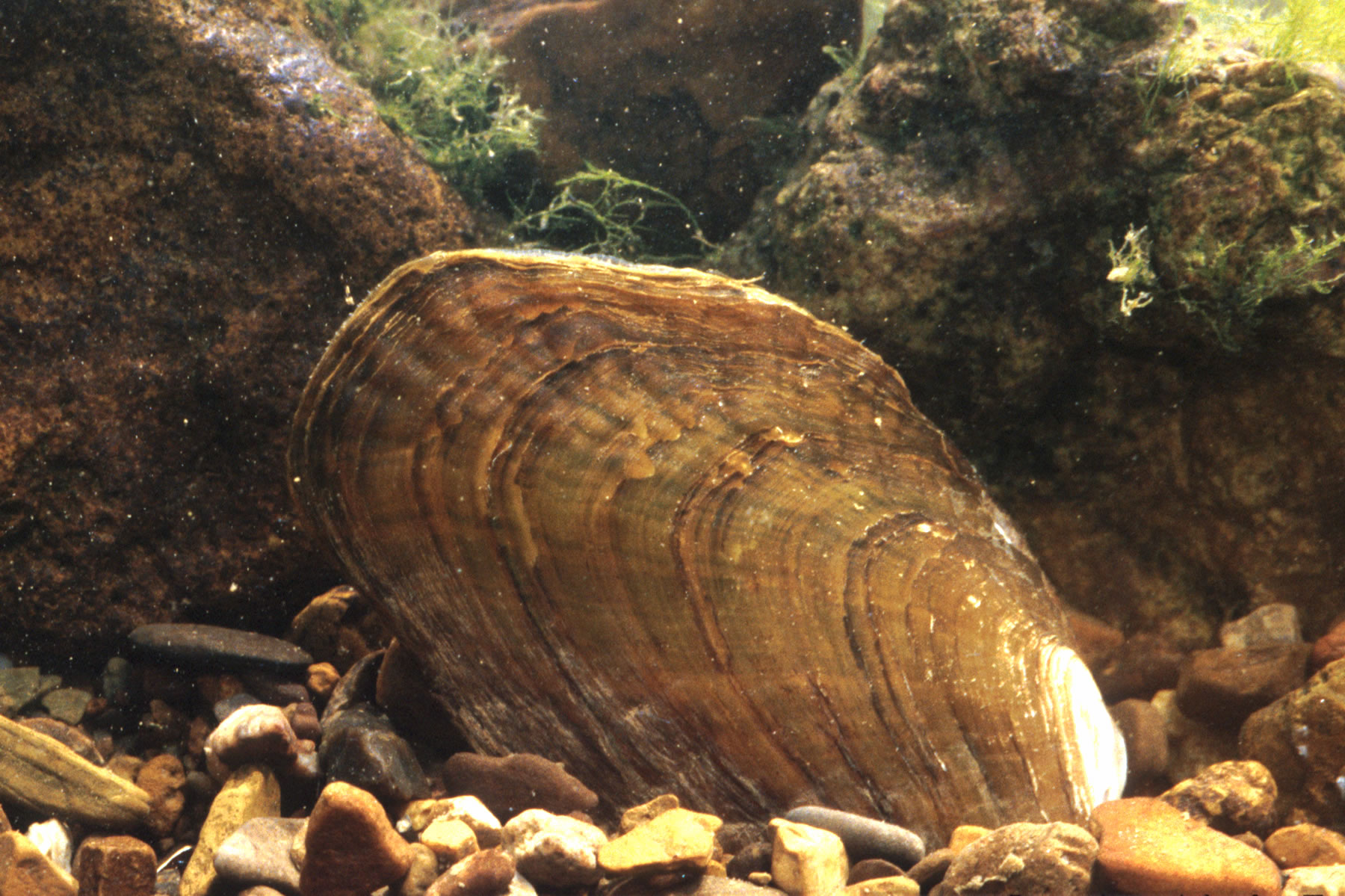
Lasmigona costata

- Lasmigona alabamensis (Alabama heelsplitter)
- Lasmigona complanata (white heelsplitter): Found in the Midwest United States in Illinois, Indiana, Wisconsin, Ohio, and Michigan.
- Lasmigona compressa (creek heelsplitter)
- Lasmigona costata (flutedshell)
- Lasmigona decorata (Carolina heelsplitter)
- Lasmigona etowaensis (Etowah heelsplitter)
- Lasmigona holstonia (Tennessee heelsplitter)
- Lasmigona subviridis (green floater)
