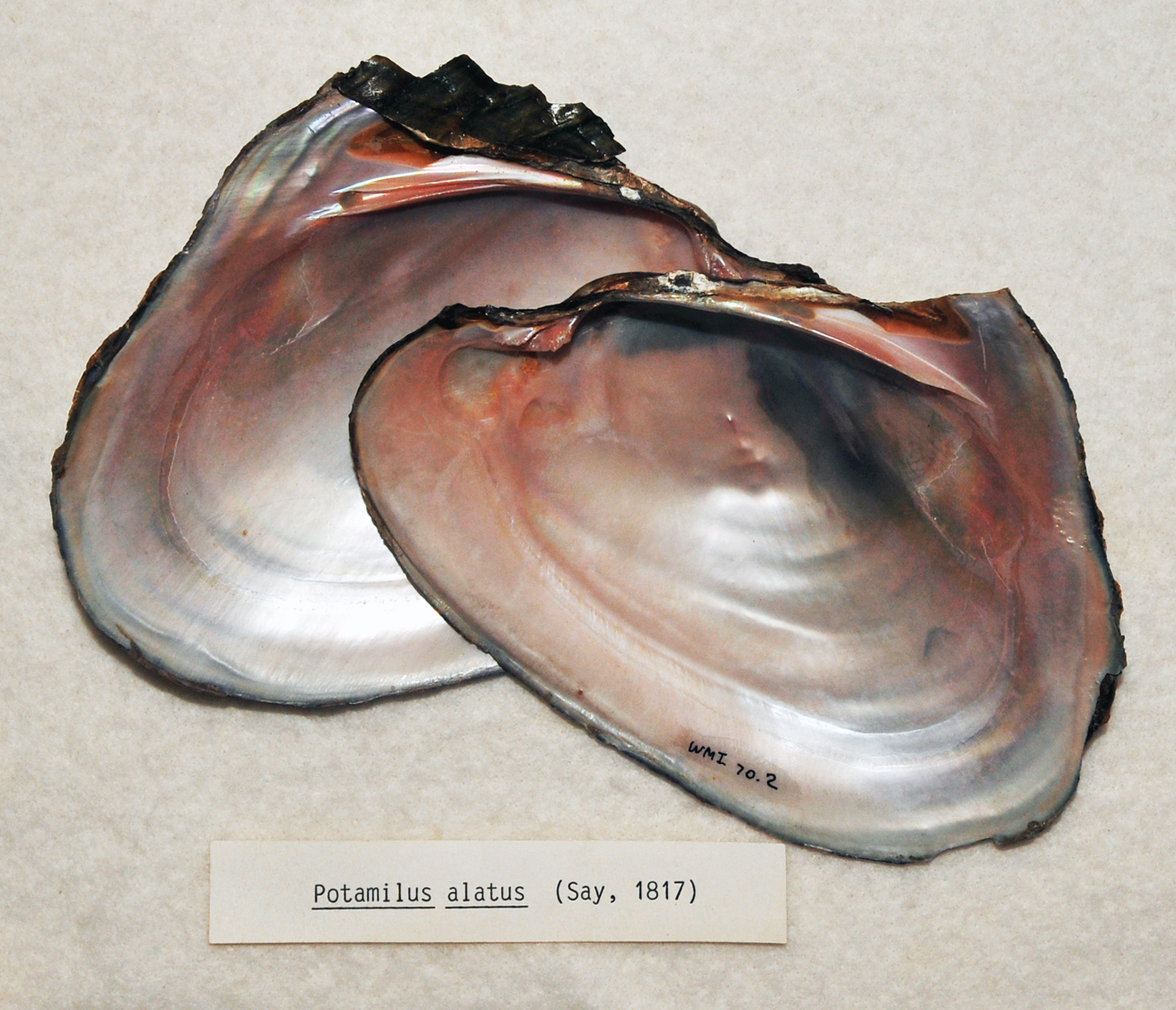
- Museum specimen

Conservation status
- Least Concern (IUCN 3.1)

- Secure (NatureServe)

Scientific classification
- Kingdom: Animalia
- Phylum: Mollusca
- Class: Bivalvia
- Order: Unionida
- Family: Unionidae
- Genus: Potamilus
- Species: P. alatus

Binomial name
- Potamilus alatus (Say, 1817)

= Potamilus alatus =

Species of bivalve

Potamilus alatus, the pink heelsplitter, is a species of freshwater mussel, an aquatic bivalve mollusk in the family Unionidae, commonly known as the river mussels.

This species is native to eastern North America. It is found in the drainages of the Ohio River, the St. Lawrence River, the Great Lakes, and the Canadian Interior Basin.
