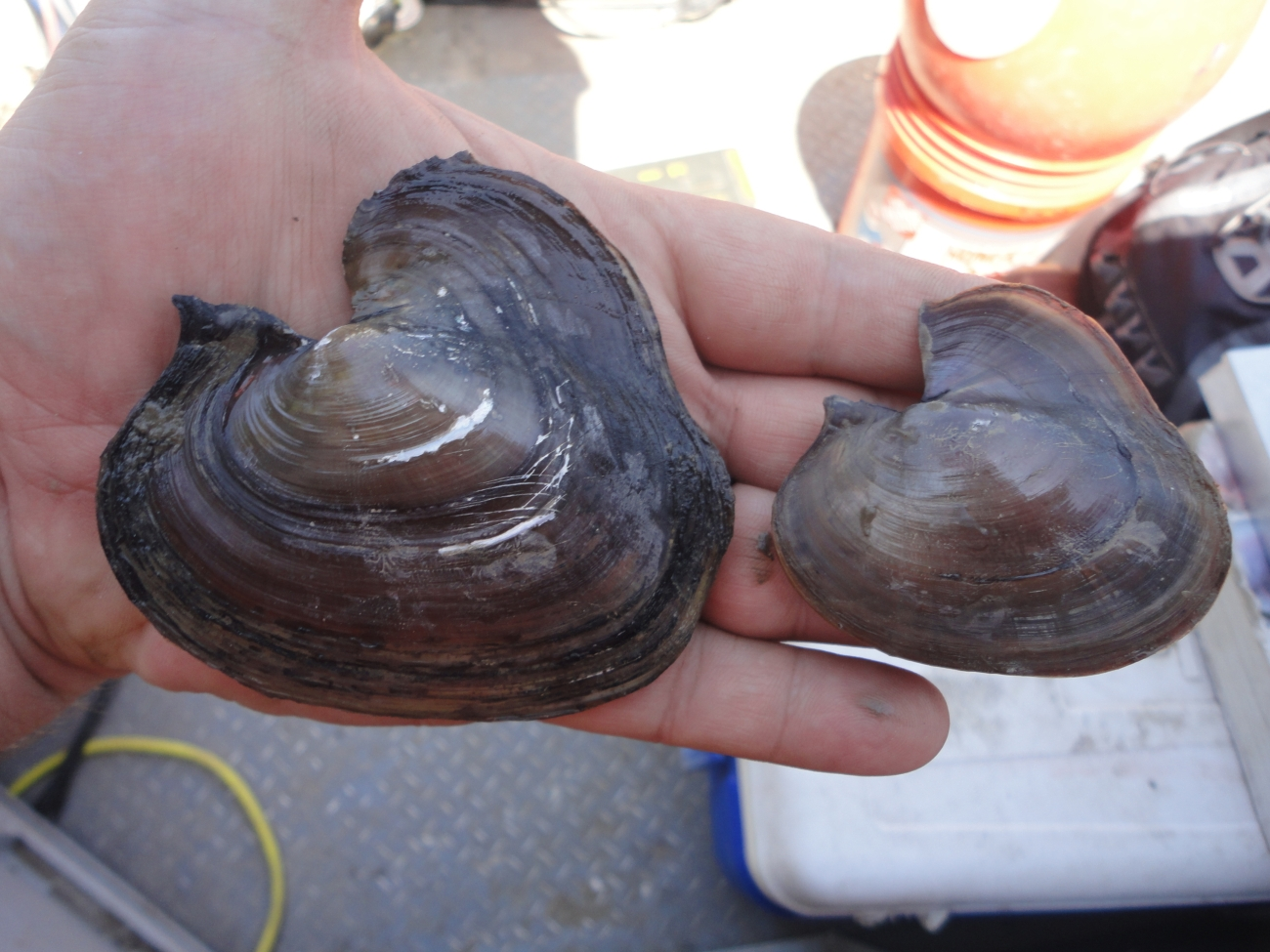

Conservation status
- Endangered (IUCN 2.3)

- Critically Imperiled (NatureServe)

Scientific classification
- Kingdom: Animalia
- Phylum: Mollusca
- Class: Bivalvia
- Order: Unionida
- Family: Unionidae
- Genus: Potamilus
- Species: P. inflatus

Binomial name
- Potamilus inflatus (I. Lea, 1831)

= Inflated heelsplitter =

Species of bivalve

Potamilus inflatus, the inflated heelsplitter, is a species of freshwater mussel, an aquatic bivalve mollusk in the family Unionidae, the river mussels.

This species was called by the common name Alabama heelsplitter in the standard reference, Turgeon, 1998. Because another species Lasmigona alabamensis was also given that same name in that publication, this duplication of name caused some confusion. Therefore, the common name of this species was subsequently changed to "inflated heelsplitter".

This species is endemic to the United States. It is an endangered species.
