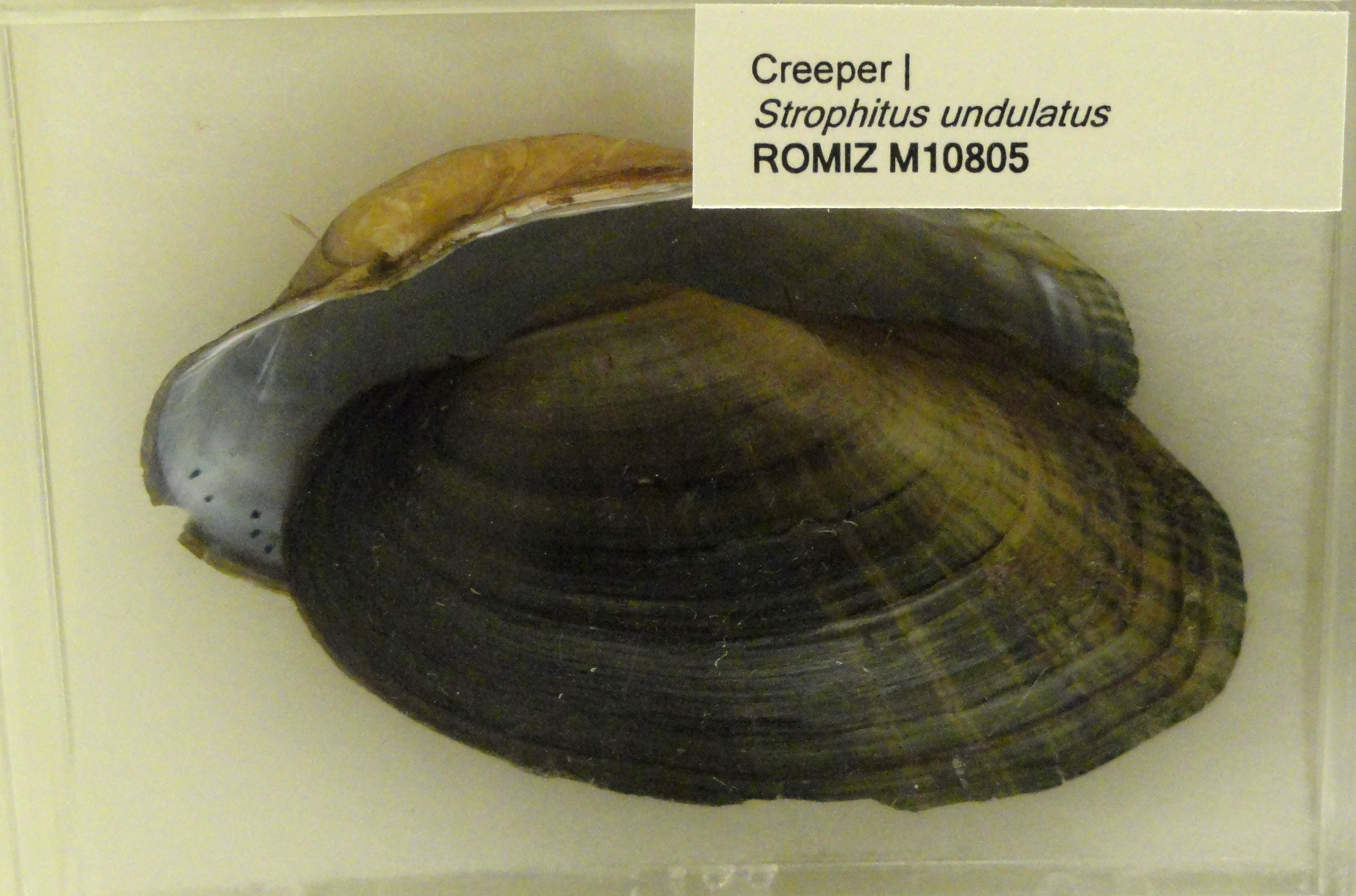
- Strophitus undulatus

Scientific classification
- Domain: Eukaryota
- Kingdom: Animalia
- Phylum: Mollusca
- Class: Bivalvia
- Order: Unionida
- Family: Unionidae
- Tribe: Anodontini
- Genus: Strophitus; Rafinesque, 1820

= Strophitus =

Genus of bivalves

Strophitus is a genus of freshwater mussels, aquatic bivalve mollusks in the family Unionidae, the river mussels. The common name of mussels in the genus Strophitus is "Creeper."

== Species within the genus Strophitus ==
- Strophitus connasaugaensis
- Strophitus subvexus
- Strophitus undulatus
