= Lasmigona alabamensis =

Conservation status
- Near Threatened (IUCN 2.3)

- Vulnerable (NatureServe)

Scientific classification
- Kingdom: Animalia
- Phylum: Mollusca
- Class: Bivalvia
- Order: Unionida
- Family: Unionidae
- Genus: Lasmigona
- Species: L. alabamensis

Binomial name
- Lasmigona alabamensis Clarke, 1985

Synonyms
- Lasmigona complanata alabamensis Clarke, 1985

Species of bivalve

Lasmigona alabamensis, common name Alabama heelsplitter, is a species of freshwater mussel, an aquatic bivalve mollusk in the family Unionidae.

Confusingly, a different species, Potamilus inflatus, has also sometimes been listed as "Alabama heelsplitter". In order to avoid confusion, that species has now been given the common name "inflated heelsplitter".
