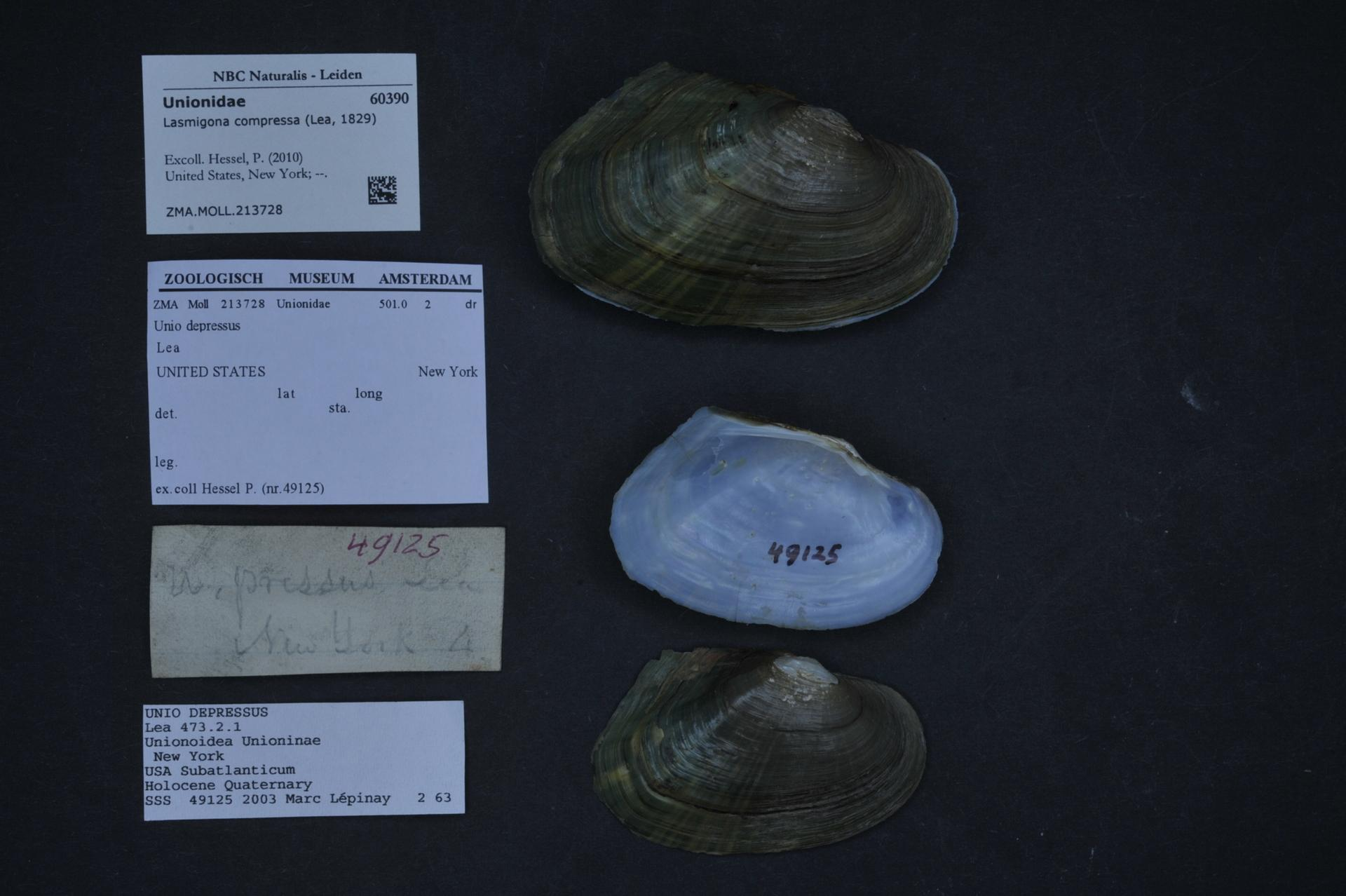

Conservation status
- Least Concern (IUCN 3.1)

- Secure (NatureServe)

Scientific classification
- Kingdom: Animalia
- Phylum: Mollusca
- Class: Bivalvia
- Order: Unionida
- Family: Unionidae
- Genus: Lasmigona
- Species: L. compressa

Binomial name
- Lasmigona compressa I. Lea, 1829

= Lasmigona compressa =

Species of bivalve

Lasmigona compressa, the creek heelsplitter, is a species of freshwater mussel, an aquatic bivalve in the family Unionidae.

This species is found in the northern region of North America. It is native to the Canadian interior basin, and the drainages of the St. Lawrence River and the Ohio River.
