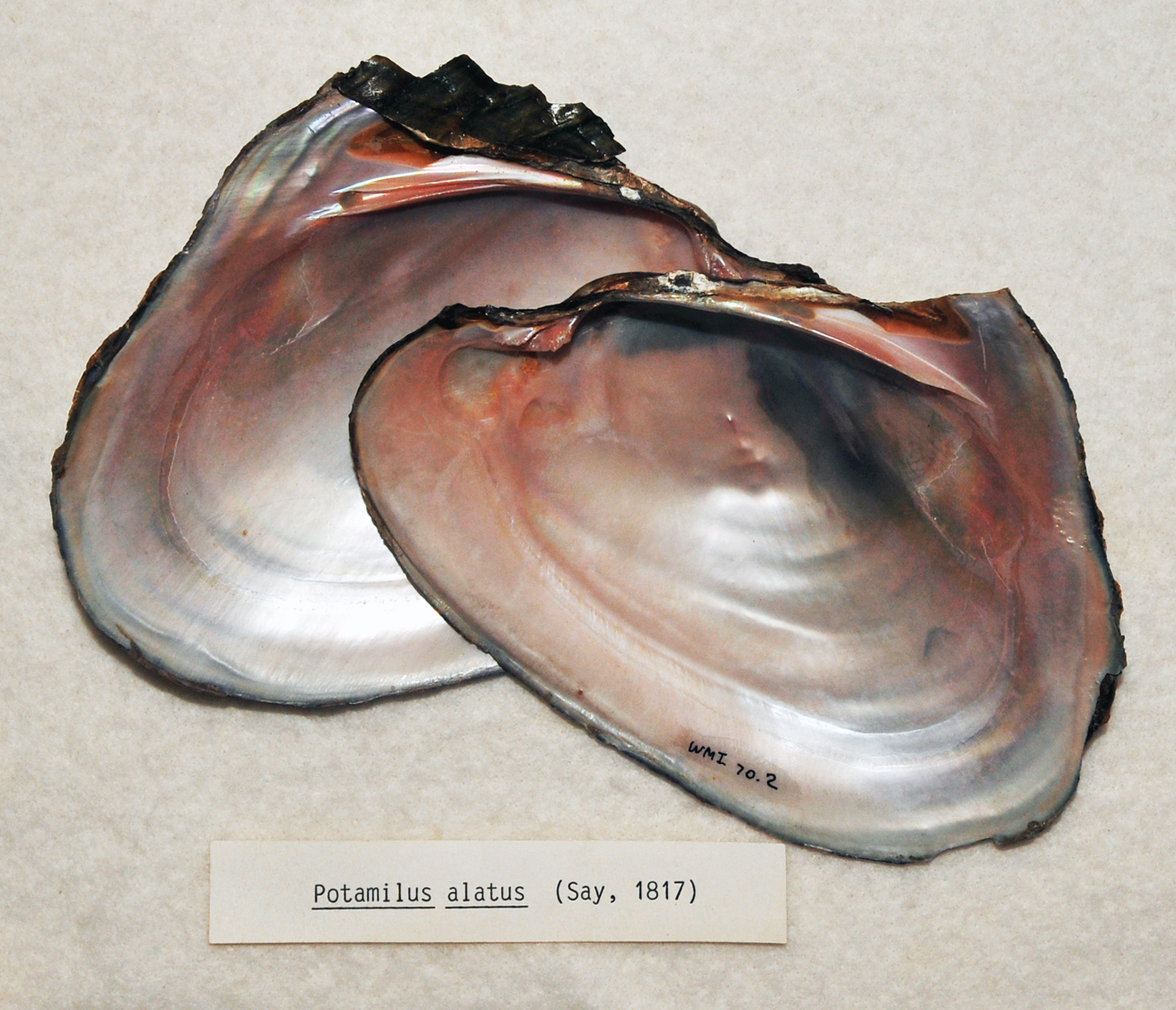
- Potamilus alatus

Scientific classification
- Domain: Eukaryota
- Kingdom: Animalia
- Phylum: Mollusca
- Class: Bivalvia
- Order: Unionida
- Family: Unionidae
- Tribe: Lampsilini
- Genus: Potamilus; Rafinesque, 1818

Synonyms
- List: Anodonta (Lastena) Rafinesque, 1820; Lampsilis (Leptodea) Rafinesque, 1820; Lampsilis (Proptera) Rafinesque, 1819; Lasmonos Rafinesque, 1831; Lastena Rafinesque, 1820; Leptodea Rafinesque, 1820; Limnadea Agassiz, 1846; Lymnadea [lapsus]; Lymnadia G. B. Sowerby II, 1839; Metaptera Rafinesque, 1820; Monelagmus Agassiz, 1846; Monelasmus Agassiz, 1846; Naidea Swainson, 1840; Paraptera Ortmann, 1911; Pareptera Ortmann, 1911; Potamilus (Lastena) Rafinesque, 1820; Proptera Rafinesque, 1819; Stenelasma Herrmannsen, 1849; Symphynota I. Lea, 1829; Symphynota (Symphynota) I. Lea, 1829; Unio (Leptodea) Rafinesque, 1820; Unio (Metaptera) Rafinesque, 1820; Unio (Symphynota) I. Lea, 1829

= Potamilus =

Genus of bivalves

Potamilus is a genus of freshwater mussels, aquatic bivalve mollusks in the family Unionidae, the river mussels.

== Species ==
Species within the genus Potamilus include:

- Potamilus alatus (pink heelsplitter)
- Potamilus amphichaenus (Texas heelsplitter)
- Potamilus capax (fat pocketbook pearly mussel)
- Potamilus inflatus (inflated heelsplitter)
- Potamilus metnecktayi (Salina mucket)
- Potamilus ohiensis (pink papershell)
- Potamilus purpuratus (bleufer)
