= John Gould Anthony =

American naturalist (1804–1877)

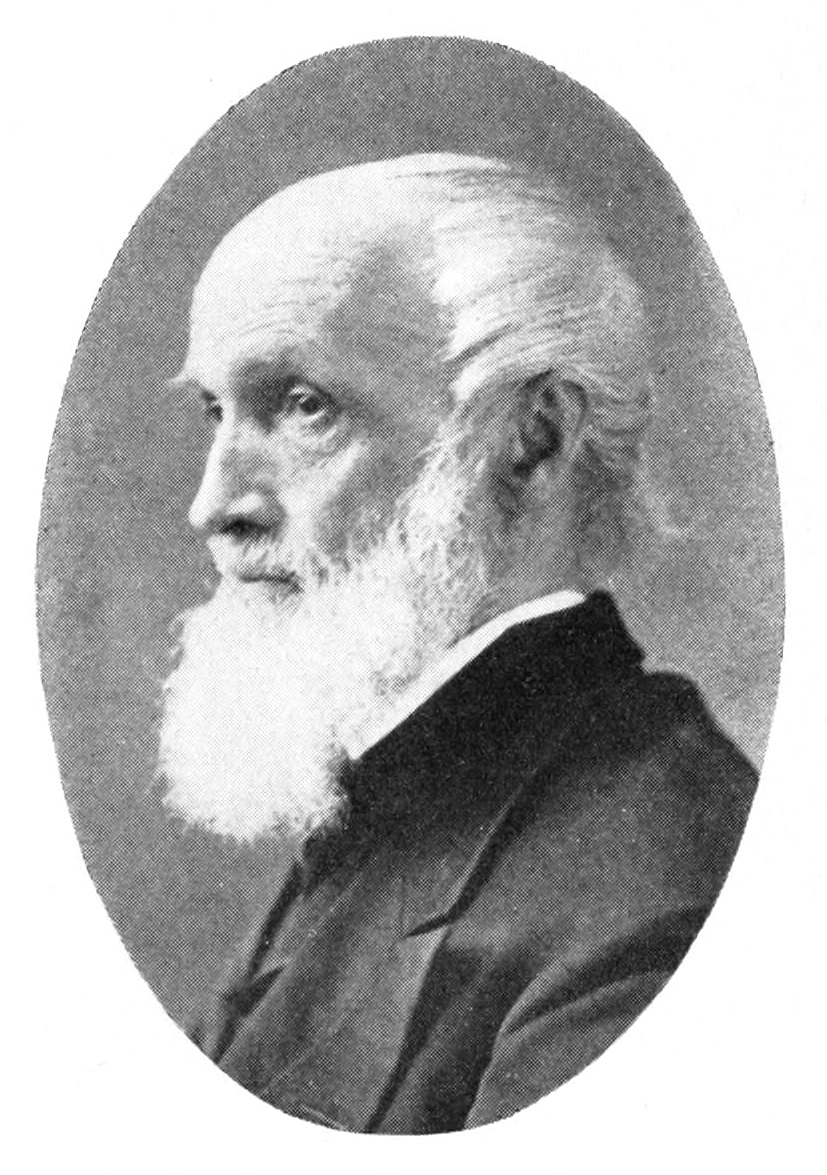
- Born: 15 May 1804; Providence, Rhode Island
- Died: 16 October 1877 (aged 73)
- Occupation: naturalist

John Gould Anthony (17 May 1804, in Providence, Rhode Island – 16 October 1877, in Cambridge, Massachusetts) was an American naturalist who became an expert on malacology, the study of mollusks. Anthony was in charge of the conchology (now malacology) department of Harvard's Museum of Comparative Zoology for over a decade.

== Biography ==
His school education was slight, and was entirely discontinued when he became 12 years of age. Business pursuits then occupied his attention. He probably first became a clerk for a mercantile concern. Throughout his life, his handwriting was in the classic clerk's or copperplate style. In 1832, he married Anna Whiting Rhodes of Cincinnati, and in 1835 the family moved to Cincinnati, where fossil mollusks were plentiful and accessible. He and his wife had nine children.

They remained in Cincinnati for 35 years, where John Gould actively engaged in commercial occupations — working in a firm making silver plate, as an independent account, as a partner in a bookselling and publishing firm. The year they arrived in Cincinnati, he joined the Western Academy of Natural Sciences, a group of serious amateurs. His interest in natural history developed.

His publications attracted the attention of Louis Agassiz, and in 1863 he was asked to take charge of the conchological department of the Museum of Comparative Zoology, where he remained until his death. He accompanied Agassiz on the Thayer Expedition to Brazil in 1865. Anthony was recognized as an authority on the American land and freshwater mollusca. He spent most of his time at Harvard sorting and mounting specimens.

== Writings ==
- A New Trilobite (Ceratocephala ceralepta) (1838)
- Fossil Encrinite (1838)
- Description of a New Fossil (Calymene Bucklandii) (1839)
- Descriptions of Three New Species of Shells (1839)
- Description of Two New Species of Anculotus (1839)
- Two Species of Fossil Asterias in the Blue Limestone of Cincinnati, with G. Graham and W. P. James (1846)
- Description of New Fluviate Shells of the Genus Melania, Lam., from the Western States of North America (1854)
- Descriptions of New Species of American Fluviate Gasteropods (1861)
- Descriptions of Two New Species of Monocondytoca (1865)
- Description of a New Exotic Melania (1865)
- Description of a New Species of Shells (1865)
- Descriptions of New American Fresh-Water Shells (1866)
