= Actinonaias =

Scientific classification
- Kingdom: Animalia
- Phylum: Mollusca
- Class: Bivalvia
- Order: Unionida
- Family: Unionidae
- Tribe: Lampsilini
- Genus: Actinonaias; Crosse & Fischer, 1894

Type species
- Unio sapotalensis Lea, 1841

Synonyms
- Unio (Actinonaias) Crosse & Fischer, 1894

Genus of freshwater mussels

Actinonaias is a genus of freshwater mussels in the family Unionidae.

== Taxonomy and history ==
Actinonaias was first described as a subgenus of Unio in 1894 by Joseph Charles Hippolyte Crosse and Paul Henri Fischer, with Unio sapotalensis as the type species. The name Actinonaias is derived from the Greek words άκτίν, meaning "ray", and ναϊάς, meaning "naiad".

The genus is now placed within the subfamily Ambleminae and tribe Lampsilini. Seven species are currently recognised.

== Species ==
This genus includes the following species:

- Actinonaias computata (Crosse & Fischer, 1894)
- Actinonaias coyensis (Pilsbry, 1910)
- Actinonaias medellina (Lea, 1838)
- Actinonaias moctezumensis (Pilsbry, 1910)
- Actinonaias sapotalensis (Lea, 1841)
- Actinonaias signata (Pilsbry, 1910)
- Actinonaias undivaga (Pilsbry, 1910)

Species formerly placed in this genus include:

- Actinonaias carinata (Barnes, 1823), Actinonaias gibba (Simpson, 1900), and Actinonaias ligamentina (Lamarck, 1819) – now accepted as Ortmanniana ligamentina (Lamarck, 1819)
- Actinonaias ellipsiformis (Conrad, 1836) – now accepted as Venustaconcha ellipsiformis (Conrad, 1836)
- Actinonaias pectorosa (Conrad, 1834) – now accepted as Lampsilis pectorosa (Conrad, 1834)
- Actinonaias rafinesqueana (Frierson, 1927) – now accepted as Lampsilis rafinesqueana Frierson, 1927
- Actinonaias walkeri Baker, 1922 – now accepted as Disconaias fimbriata (Frierson, 1907)
