= Mucket =

Mucket is a common name that may refer to several species of North American freshwater mussels in the family Unionidae. The term primarily refers to the species Ortmanniana ligamentina, but other species commonly known as muckets include:

- Atlanticoncha ochracea, commonly known as the tidewater mucket
- Hamiota perovalis, commonly known as the orangenacre mucket
- Lampsilis abrupta, commonly known as the pink mucket
- Lampsilis rafinesqueana, commonly known as the Neosho mucket
- Potamilus metnecktayi, commonly known as the Salina mucket
