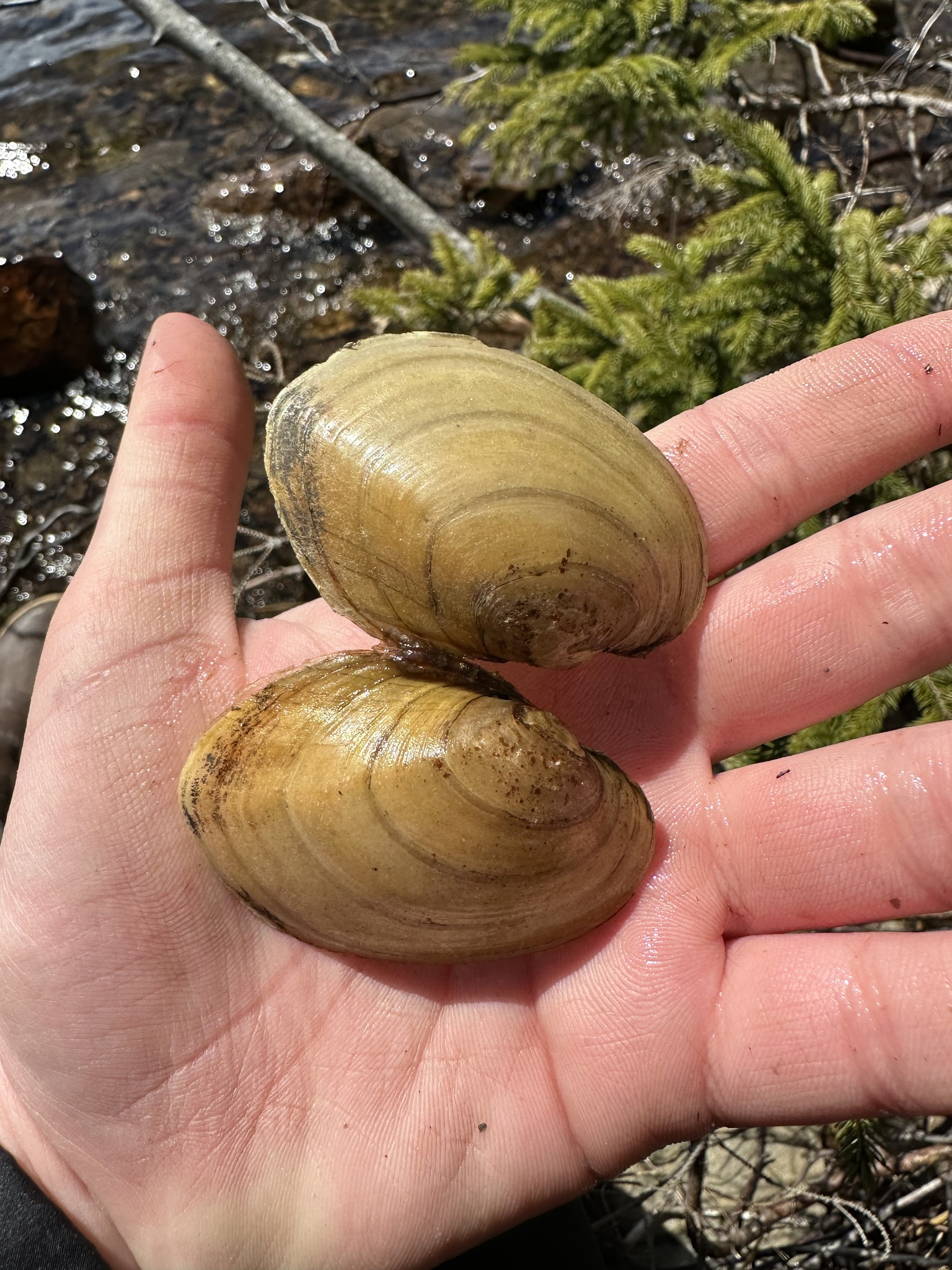

Conservation status
- Vulnerable (IUCN 3.1)

- Vulnerable (NatureServe)

Scientific classification
- Kingdom: Animalia
- Phylum: Mollusca
- Class: Bivalvia
- Order: Unionida
- Family: Unionidae
- Genus: Lampsilis
- Species: L. cariosa

Binomial name
- Lampsilis cariosa (Say, 1817)

= Lampsilis cariosa =

Species of mollusc

Lampsilis cariosa, the Yellow Lampmussel, is a species of freshwater mussel, an aquatic bivalve mollusk in the family Unionidae, the river mussels. The Yellow Lampmussel can be found in rivers and lakes in the eastern United States and Canadian maritime provinces (the "Atlantic Slope"). Bivalves are essential organisms in both aquatic and marine ecosystems, acting as natural water filters. A single freshwater bivalve can filter 0.5 to 1.25 gallons of water and hour.

== Description ==
Adults can grow to 75-155 mm (approx. 3-4 inches). They display sexual dimorphism; adult females have a rounder posterior margin while adult males are more elongated (comin. The shells are glossy, yellow to reddish-brown, and have greenish colored growth rings. L. cariosa can be mistaken for other Unionidae like Atlanticoncha ochracea and Lampsilis cardium. Furthermore, L. cariosa and L. cardium are thought to be hydrizing in regions of co-occurrence such as the Potomac drainage.

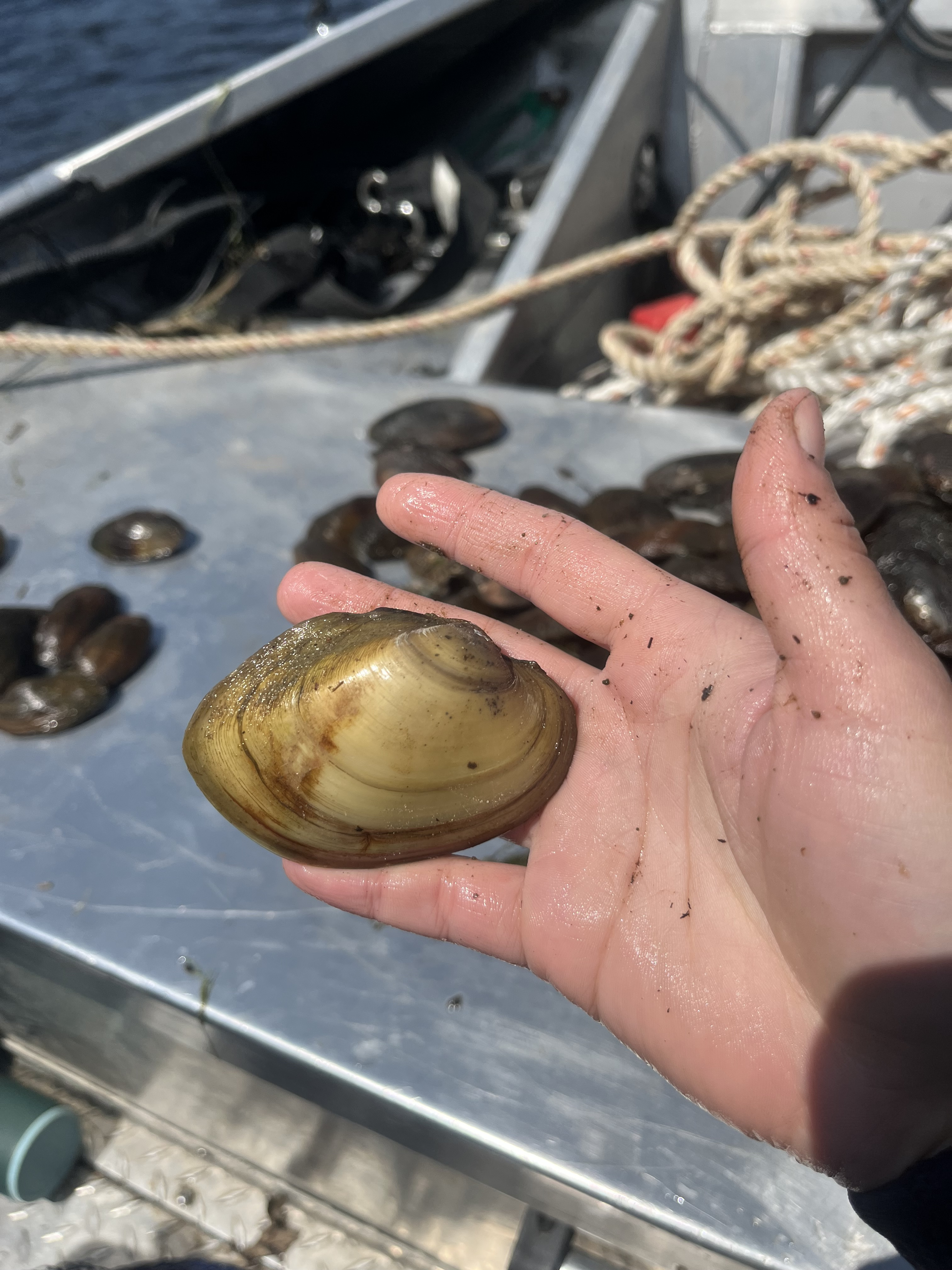
Yellow Lampmussel from the Penobscot River in Medway, Maine

== Distribution and habitat ==
This species is currently believed to occupy 124 Hydrologic Unit Code 8 watersheds in Canada and the United States. It is commonly found in large rivers, but can also be found in lakes and ponds in its northern range like Maine and Nova Scotia.

== Ecology and life history ==
=== Lifespan ===
L. cariosa can live up to 15 years, reaching sexual maturity around 2-4 years. Their eggs are typically fertilized in late summer or fall, becoming glochidia larvae, and mature as the females overwinter. Females are gravid from March to October, making them bradytictic.

=== Reproduction ===
L. cariosa and other Lampsilis sp. utilize a parasitic reproductive strategy. Lampsilis sp. display a mantle-flap that resembles a small bait fish that attracts larger predatory fish. These fish bite down on the lure (thereby the mussel gills), which then releases the glochidia and they embed themselves into the fish's gills. They remain on the fish, feeding on their blood, until they detach after 14-55 days as juvenile mussels.

=== Host fish relationships ===
The habitat range of L. cariosa depends greatly on the presence and abundance of host fish species. Confirmed host fish species include Morone americana and Perca flavescens. Researches have successfully used Micropterus salmoides, Pomoxis nigromaculatus, Morone chrysops, and Morone saxtilis as host species in lab settings.

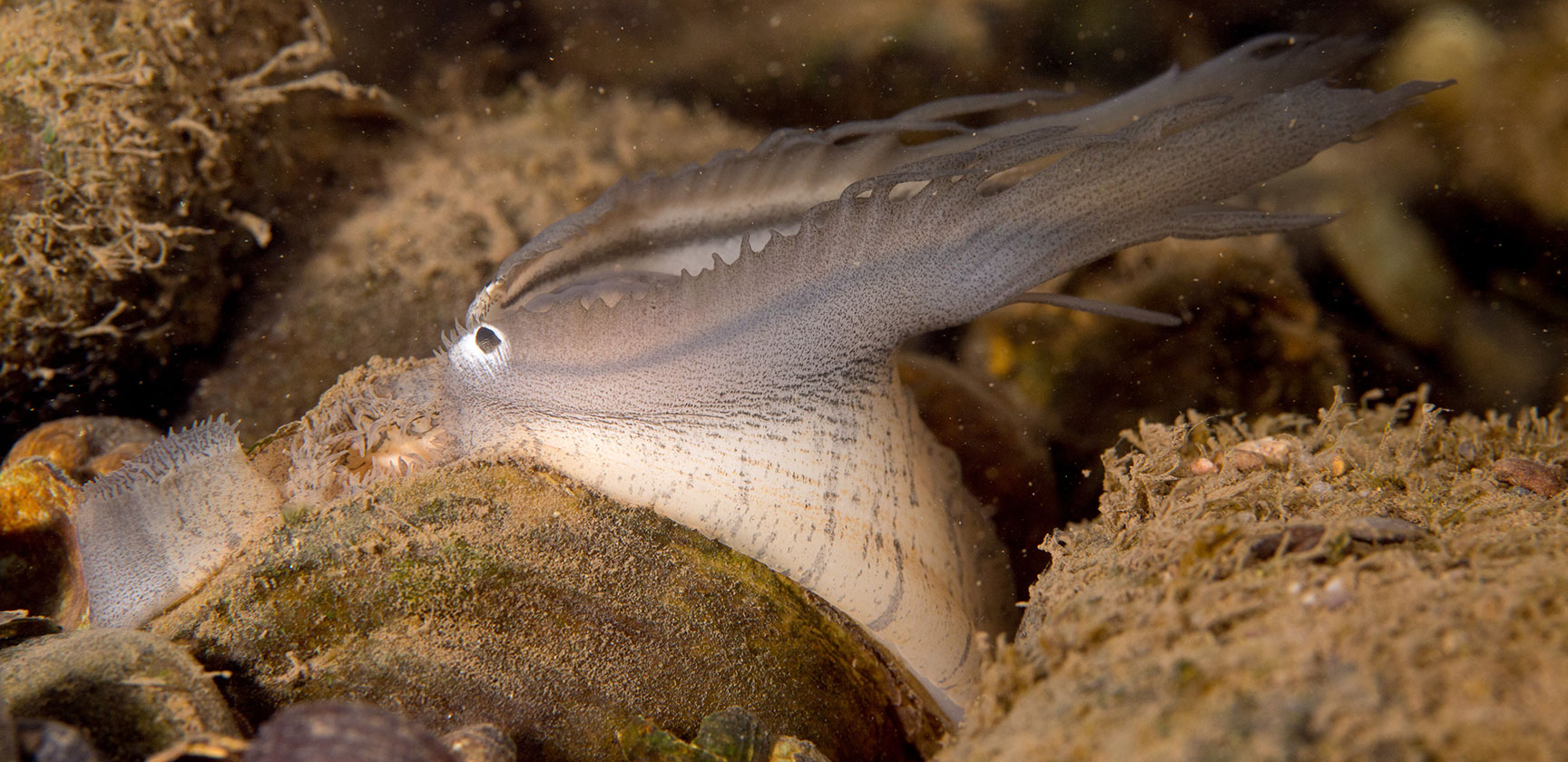
A mussel (Lampsilis cardium) displays a mantle lure in the Potomac River

== Conservation status and threats ==
The Committee on the Status of Endangered Wildlife in Canada (COSEWIC) has listed it as a species of special concern. The Canadian Species at Risk Act listed it in the List of Wildlife Species at Risk as being a species of special concern in Canada. It is believed to be extirpated in Rhode Island and Vermont. It is listed as endangered in four U.S. states (Massachusetts, Connecticut, Delaware, and North Carolina) and is listed as a special status in 10 other states.

L. cariosa faces many serious threats. Warming waters due to climate change are affecting that habitability of aquatic systems for many of the host fish species, leading to a decrease in L. cariosa. Habitat fragmentation caused primarily by the construction of dams have also led to the decrease in host fish species. Competition from other invasive bivalve species like Zebra mussels (Dreissena polymorpha) and Asian clams (Corbicula fluminea) also threaten the status of L. cariosa and other native freshwater bivalves.

== Restoration efforts ==
Captive propagation is a very effective tool for rebuilding freshwater mussel populations. A multi-state restoration effort led by the Virginia Department of Wildlife Resources Aquatic Wildlife Conservation Center uses this method and as of 2025, has released over 72,000 L. cariosa into Virginia watersheds.

Dam removals prove to be one of the most effective restoration practices for fragmented aquatic ecosystems. Rivers that undergo dam removal and habitat restoration are shown to return to healthy states faster and more comprehensively.

== See also ==
- Oyster
- Water purification
- Mussels
- Clams
- Bivalves
- Ecological restoration
- Dam removal
