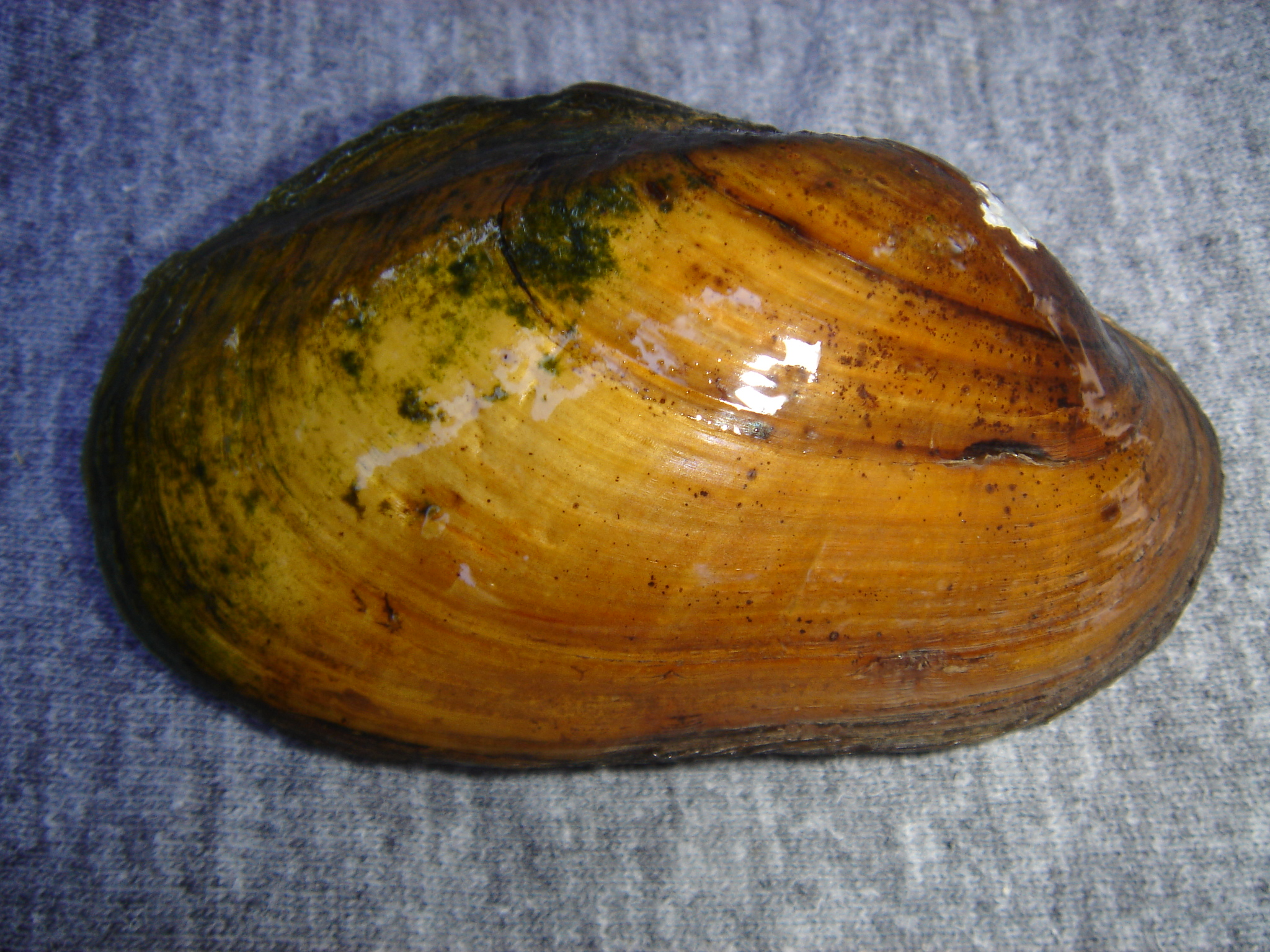

Conservation status
- Endangered (IUCN 2.3)

- Imperiled (NatureServe)

Scientific classification
- Kingdom: Animalia
- Phylum: Mollusca
- Class: Bivalvia
- Order: Unionida
- Family: Unionidae
- Genus: Lampsilis
- Species: L. powellii

Binomial name
- Lampsilis powellii I. Lea, 1852

= Lampsilis powellii =

Species of bivalve

Lampsilis powellii is a rare species of freshwater mussel known by the common name Arkansas fatmucket. It is endemic to Arkansas in the United States, where it occurs in the Ouachita, Saline, and Caddo River systems. It is one of two mussels endemic to Arkansas, the other being speckled pocketbook (Lampsilis streckeri). It is a federally listed threatened species of the United States.

This mussel, a bivalve mollusc in family Unionidae, is oblong oval in shape and can reach over 10 centimeters in length. The shell is brownish to olive green to tawny in color on the outside and iridescent bluish white on the inner surface. The back end of the shell of the male is pointed and that of the female is rounded.

The mussel occurs in deep pools with enough water flow to remove debris, but it does not occur in riffles or impounded pools that lack water flow. The substrate is sand, sometimes with rocks and gravel. It often lives next to river islands with stands of water willow (Justicia americana) in water about a meter deep.

During breeding the male releases sperm and the female siphons it from the water. The fertilized eggs remain in the gills of the female. The glochidia, the larvae of the mussel, are released into the water and attach to a host, which is a fish. The flap of the adult's mantle resembles a small fish and apparently attracts larger fish close enough for the glochidia to reach them. In a cyst on the fish they undergo metamorphosis to become juvenile mussels and then drop to the substrate to develop further.

This mussel is threatened by a number of processes. The rivers it inhabits have been impounded by dams at a number of locations, forming lakes and reservoirs including Lake Ouachita, Lake Hamilton and Lake Catherine. The rivers have been channelized and dredged. They have undergone increased sedimentation and the flow rates have decreased enough that the sediment is not removed. Water quality has decreased because of runoff from barite mining on the Caddo River and bauxite mining on the Saline, and wastewater on a tributary of the Ouachita. Other sources of runoff include timber operations, roads, and feedlots. Most of the land in these river basins is used for silviculture.
