= Lampsilis fullerkati =

Conservation status
- Near Threatened (IUCN 2.3)

Scientific classification
- Kingdom: Animalia
- Phylum: Mollusca
- Class: Bivalvia
- Order: Unionida
- Family: Unionidae
- Genus: Lampsilis
- Species: L. fullerkati

Binomial name
- Lampsilis fullerkati R.I. Johnson, 1984

Species of bivalve

Lampsilis fullerkati, the Waccamaw fatmucket, is a former species of freshwater mussel, an aquatic bivalve mollusk in the family Unionidae, the river mussels. This former species is endemic to the United States. It is now considered synonymous with Lampsilis radiata.
