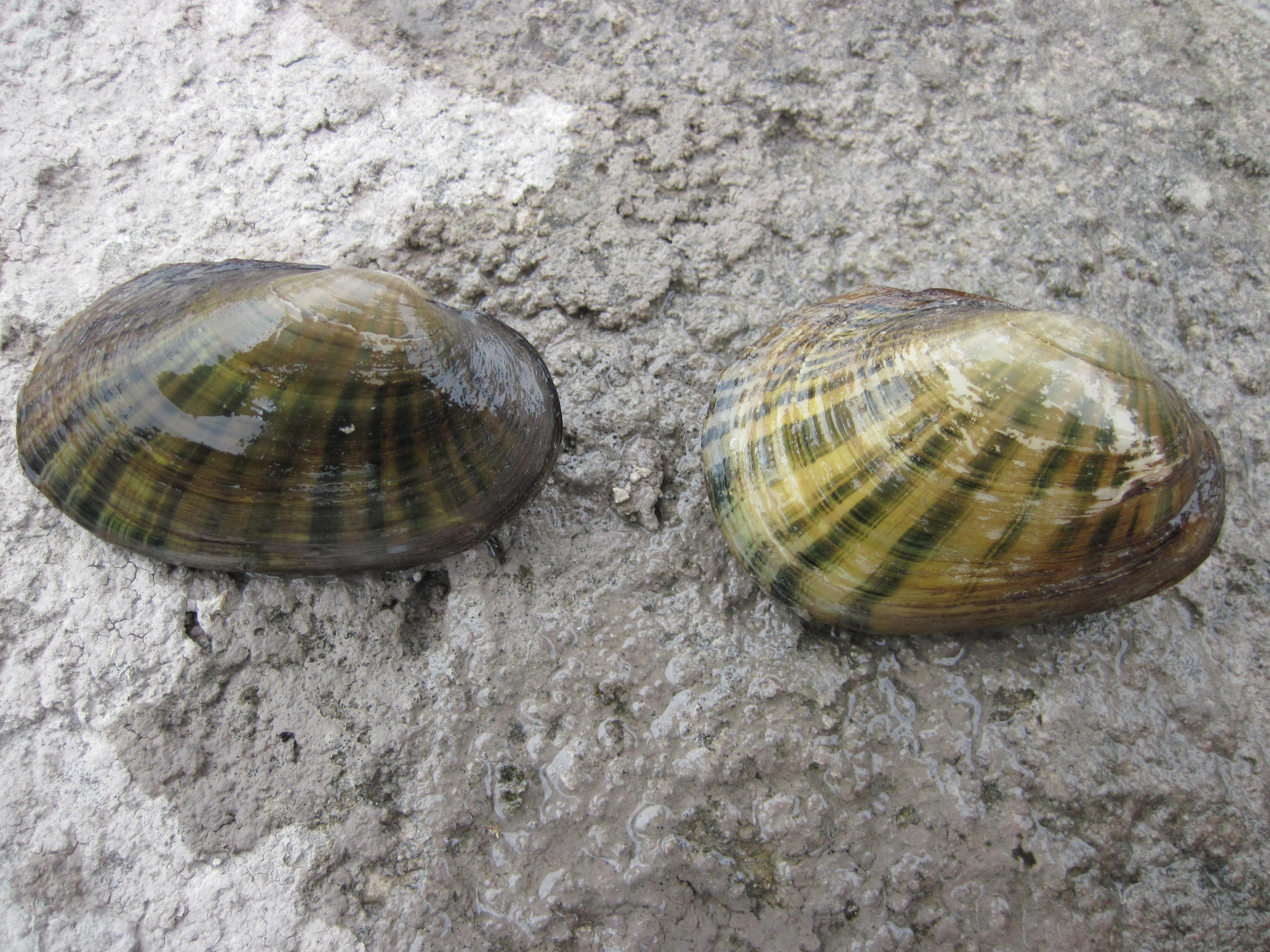
- Two Texas fatmuckets

Conservation status
- Near Threatened (IUCN 2.3)

- Critically Imperiled (NatureServe)

Scientific classification
- Kingdom: Animalia
- Phylum: Mollusca
- Class: Bivalvia
- Order: Unionida
- Family: Unionidae
- Genus: Lampsilis
- Species: L. bracteata

Binomial name
- Lampsilis bracteata (A. Gould, 1855)

Synonyms
- Unio bracteatus Gould, 1855; Ligumia bracteata (Gould, 1855); Margaron (Unio) bracteatus (Gould, 1855)

= Lampsilis bracteata =

Species of bivalve

Lampsilis bracteata, the Texas fatmucket, is a species of freshwater mussel in the family Unionidae, the river mussels. This species is endemic to the tributaries of the Colorado River within the Edwards Plateau region in Texas, the United States. Populations from the upper Guadalupe River basin are now assigned to a distinct species, Lampsilis bergmanni. The two species are morphologically indistinguishable but genetically distinct.

== Habitat ==
Lampsilis bracteata occurs in streams and smaller rivers at depths of less than 1 m (3.3 ft).

== Description ==
Lampsilis bracteata grows to a shell length of about 10 cm (4 in). It is sexually dimorphic: males are more elliptical whereas females are oval to quadrate.
