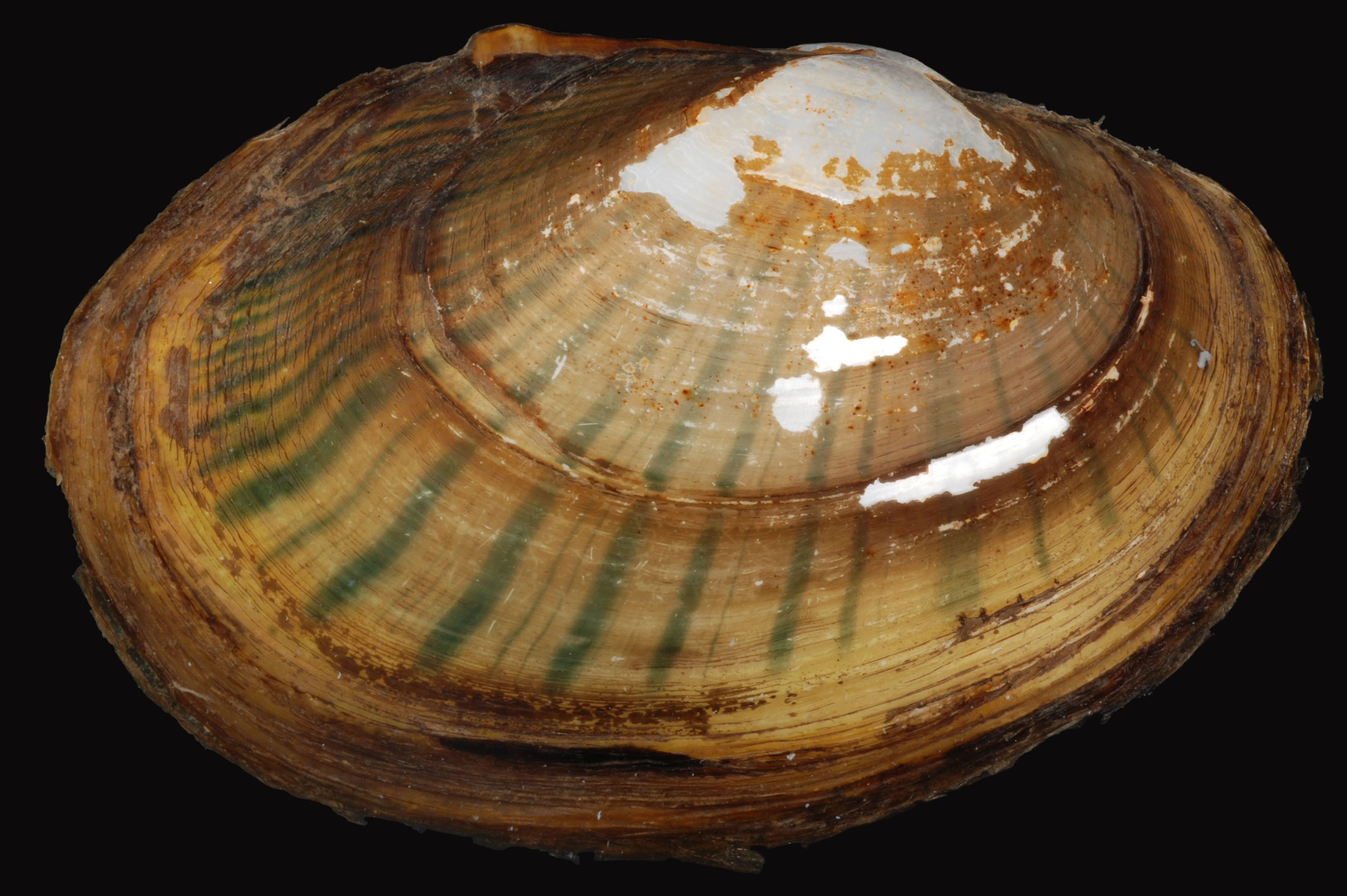
- Lampsilis radiata

Scientific classification
- Kingdom: Animalia
- Phylum: Mollusca
- Class: Bivalvia
- Order: Unionida
- Family: Unionidae
- Tribe: Lampsilini
- Genus: Lampsilis; Rafinesque, 1820

= Lampsilis =

Genus of bivalves

Lampsilis is a genus of freshwater mussels, aquatic bivalve mollusks in the family Unionidae, the river mussels. There are over 100 species in the genus.

== Aggressive mimicry ==
Aggressive mimicry in L. fasciola

Some species, notably Lampsilis ovata (pocketbook mussel) use aggressive mimicry to lure large predatory fish by using their mantle as a lure, ejecting larvae into the mouth of the fish when they strike. The larvae attach to the gills, using the fish's blood as food for several weeks.

== Species ==
- Lampsilis abrupta (pink mucket)
- †Lampsilis binominata (lined pocketbook)
- Lampsilis bracteata
- Lampsilis cardium
- Lampsilis cariosa (yellow lampmussel)
- Lampsilis dolabraeformis
- Lampsilis fasciola (wavy-rayed lampmussel)
- Lampsilis floridensis (Florida sandshell)
- Lampsilis fullerkati (Waccamaw fatmucket, now considered synonymous with L. radiata)
- Lampsilis higginsii (Higgins' eye pearly mussel)
- Lampsilis ornata
- Lampsilis ovata (pocketbook mussel)
- Lampsilis powellii (Arkansas fatmucket)
- Lampsilis radiata (Eastern lampmussel)
- Lampsilis rafinesqueana (Neosho mucket)
- Lampsilis reeveiana
- Lampsilis satura
- Lampsilis sietmani (Canary kingshell)
- Lampsilis siliquoidea (fatmucket clam)
- Lampsilis splendida
- Lampsilis straminea (rough fatmucket)
- Lampsilis streckeri (speckled pocketbook)
- Lampsilis teres (yellow sandshell)
- Lampsilis virescens (Alabama lamp naiad)

== Gallery ==
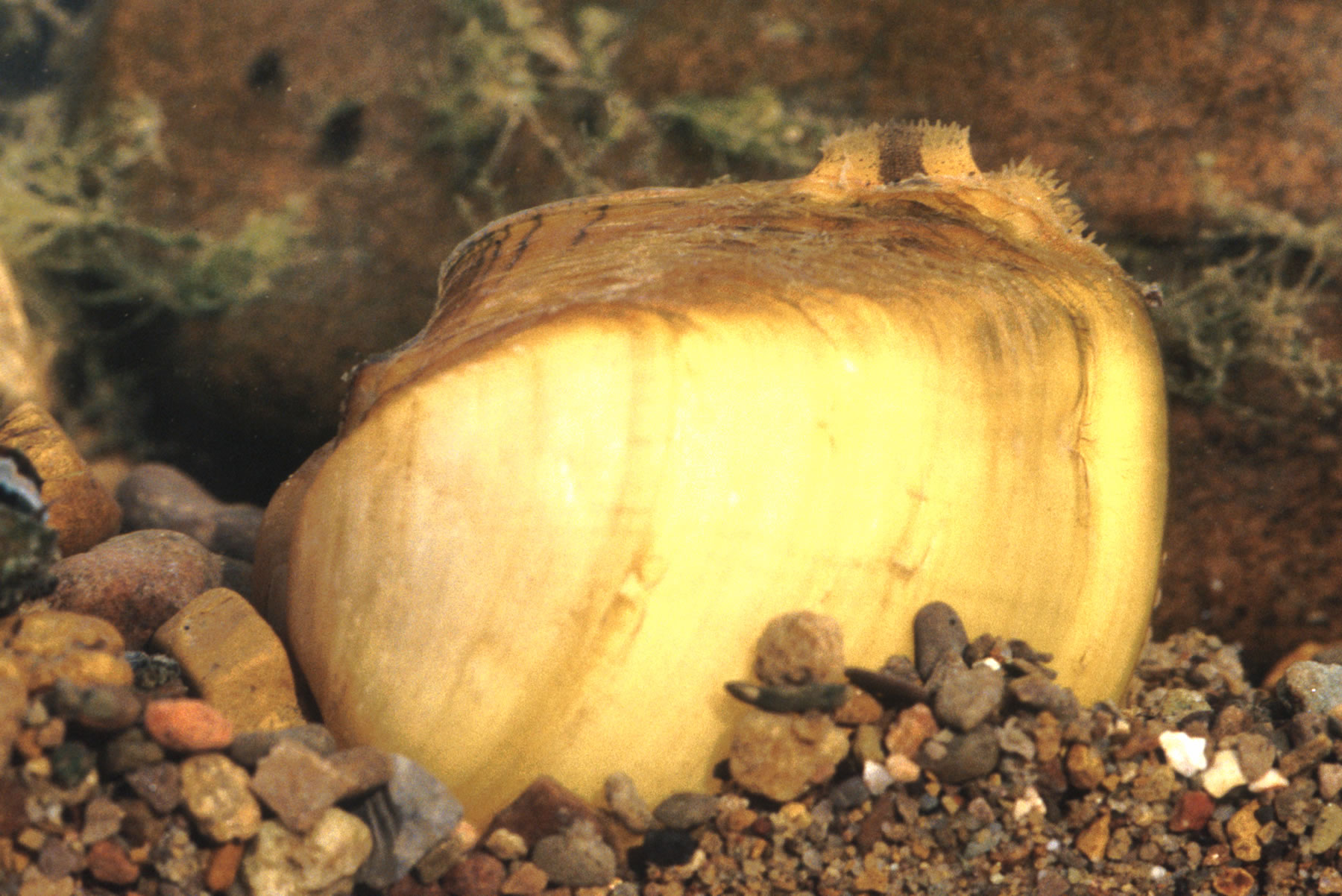
Lampsilis ovata

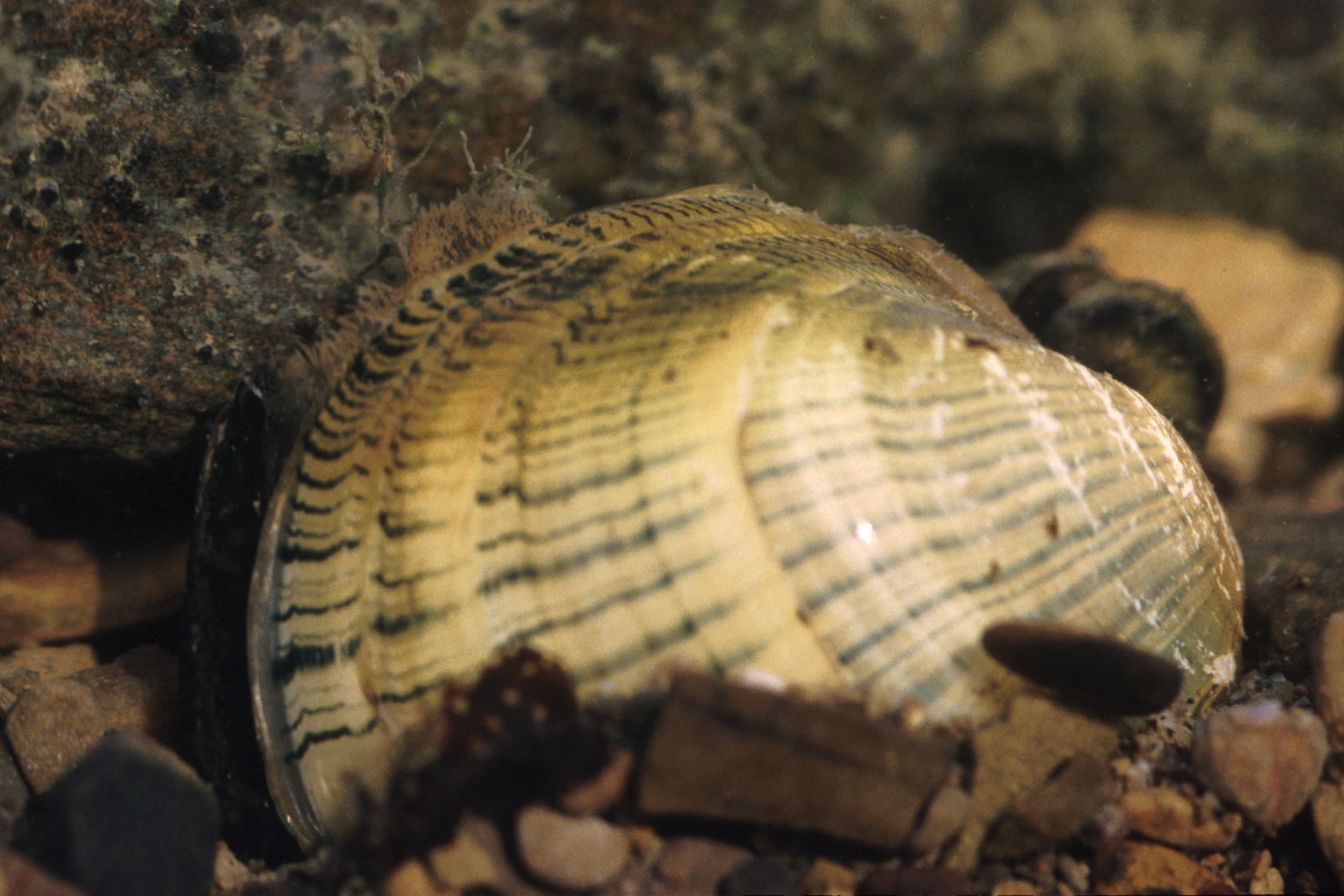
Lampsilis fasciola
