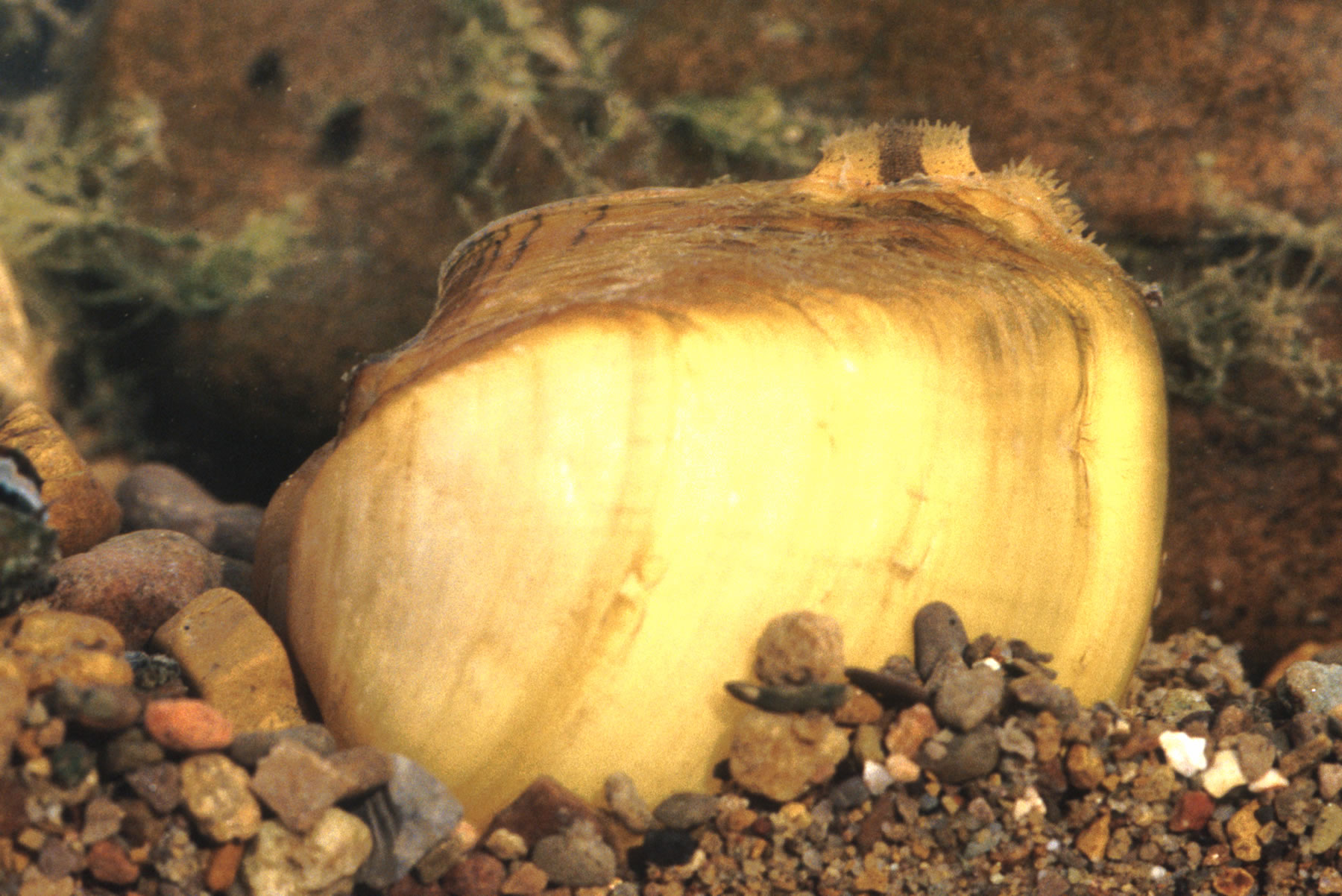

Conservation status
- Least Concern (IUCN 3.1)

- Secure (NatureServe)

Scientific classification
- Kingdom: Animalia
- Phylum: Mollusca
- Class: Bivalvia
- Order: Unionida
- Family: Unionidae
- Genus: Lampsilis
- Species: L. ovata

Binomial name
- Lampsilis ovata Say, 1817

= Lampsilis ovata =

Species of bivalve

Lampsilis ovata, or pocketbook mussel, is a species of freshwater mussel, a bivalve mollusk in the family Unionidae, the river mussels. This species is endemic to eastern North America.

This species uses aggressive mimicry to lure large predatory fish such as the large-mouth bass, using their mantle, which resembles a fish, as a lure and ejecting larvae into the mouth of the fish when they strike. The larvae attach to the gills, using the fish's blood as food for several weeks, without apparent harm to the fish, and then drop off and start the cycle again.
