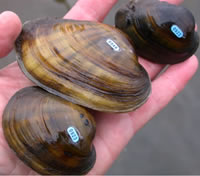

Conservation status
- Endangered (IUCN 2.3)
- CITES Appendix I (CITES)

Scientific classification
- Kingdom: Animalia
- Phylum: Mollusca
- Class: Bivalvia
- Order: Unionida
- Family: Unionidae
- Genus: Lampsilis
- Species: L. higginsii

Binomial name
- Lampsilis higginsii (Lea, 1857)

Synonyms
- Unio higginsii Lea, 1857

= Lampsilis higginsii =

Species of bivalve

Lampsilis higginsii is a rare species of freshwater mussel known as Higgins' eye pearly mussel or simply Higgins' eye. It is endemic to the United States, where it occurs in the upper Mississippi River and the drainages of some of its tributaries. It is threatened by the introduced zebra mussel (Dreissena polymorpha). Lampsilis higginsii is a federally listed endangered species.

== Description ==
This bivalve mollusc is in the family Unionidae, the river mussels. It is oval in shape with a thick, heavy shell which is yellowish or brown, sometimes with greenish rays. It reaches up to 10.2 centimeters in length (between 4-5 inches). The nacre is white, sometimes tinged pink and partly iridescent.

== Conservation ==
The historical range of this species stretched along 850 kilometers (about 520 miles) of the Mississippi River from Prescott, Wisconsin, to Louisiana, Missouri, as well as nine tributaries of the Mississippi. Today it can be found in the Mississippi from La Crosse, Wisconsin, to Muscatine, Iowa, and two tributaries, the St. Croix and Wisconsin Rivers. It has always been rare, but it experienced a large reduction in population after 1965, when it began to lose the northernmost and southernmost reaches of its distribution, a total of over 50% of its range. One cause of the drop in population was pollution. The mussel is now extirpated from the Illinois River because of pollution. The habitat has been altered by impoundments, including dams and locks. Sedimentation may also have negatively affected the mussel. Overfishing may have reduced the population, as well.

Today the worst threat to the species is the invasive species invasion of the zebra mussel. Zebra mussels attach to the shells of this and other native mussels, deforming them, preventing them from moving, and preventing their filter feeding. The zebra mussels can use up all the food in the vicinity and deplete the oxygen, and may also consume the native mussels' larvae and sperm, preventing reproduction. Deposits of waste products degrade the habitat. Other invasive species include the Asian clam (Corbicula fluminea), which competes with the native mussel and consumes its sperm, larvae, and juveniles. Some introduced species of fish may eat juvenile mussels.

This mussel has been propagated in captivity and released into appropriate habitat in areas where it has been extirpated.

== Biology ==
During breeding, the male releases sperm and the female siphons it and keeps the fertilized eggs in her gills until they hatch. The glochidia, or mussel larvae, are released and enter the bodies of host organisms, which are fish. Some fish hosts for the mussel are largemouth bass (Micropterus salmoides), smallmouth bass (M. dolomieu), walleye (Sander vitreus), and yellow perch (Perca flavescens).
