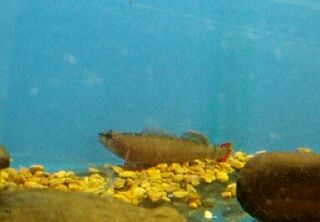

Conservation status
- Endangered (IUCN 3.1)

Scientific classification
- Kingdom: Animalia
- Phylum: Chordata
- Class: Actinopterygii
- Division: Teleostei
- Order: Perciformes
- Family: Percidae
- Genus: Etheostoma
- Species: E. moorei

Binomial name
- Etheostoma moorei Raney & Suttkus, 1964

= Yellowcheek darter =

Species of fish

The yellowcheek darter (Etheostoma moorei) is a species of freshwater ray-finned fish, a darter from the subfamily Etheostomatinae, part of the family Percidae, which also contains the perches, ruffes and pikeperches. It is endemic to the eastern United States where it is only known to occur in the state of Arkansas in the Little Red River. It inhabits medium-sized and smaller rivers in rocky riffles with strong current. This species can reach a length of 7.2 centimetres (2.8 in) TL though most only reach about 4.9 centimetres (1.9 in).

In July 2010, the United States Fish and Wildlife Service proposed the yellowcheek darter for endangered status. The fish is a federally listed endangered species of the United States, effective September 8, 2011.

The yellowcheek darter was first formally described in 1964 by Edward Cowden Raney and Royal Dallas Suttkus with the type locality given as 2.5 miles southwest of Woodrow on the Devils Fork of the Little Red River in Cleburne County, Arkansas. The specific name honours the American ichthyologist George A. Moore (1899–1999) of Oklahoma.

== See also ==
- Lampsilis streckeri: Also endemic to the Little Red River (Arkansas)
