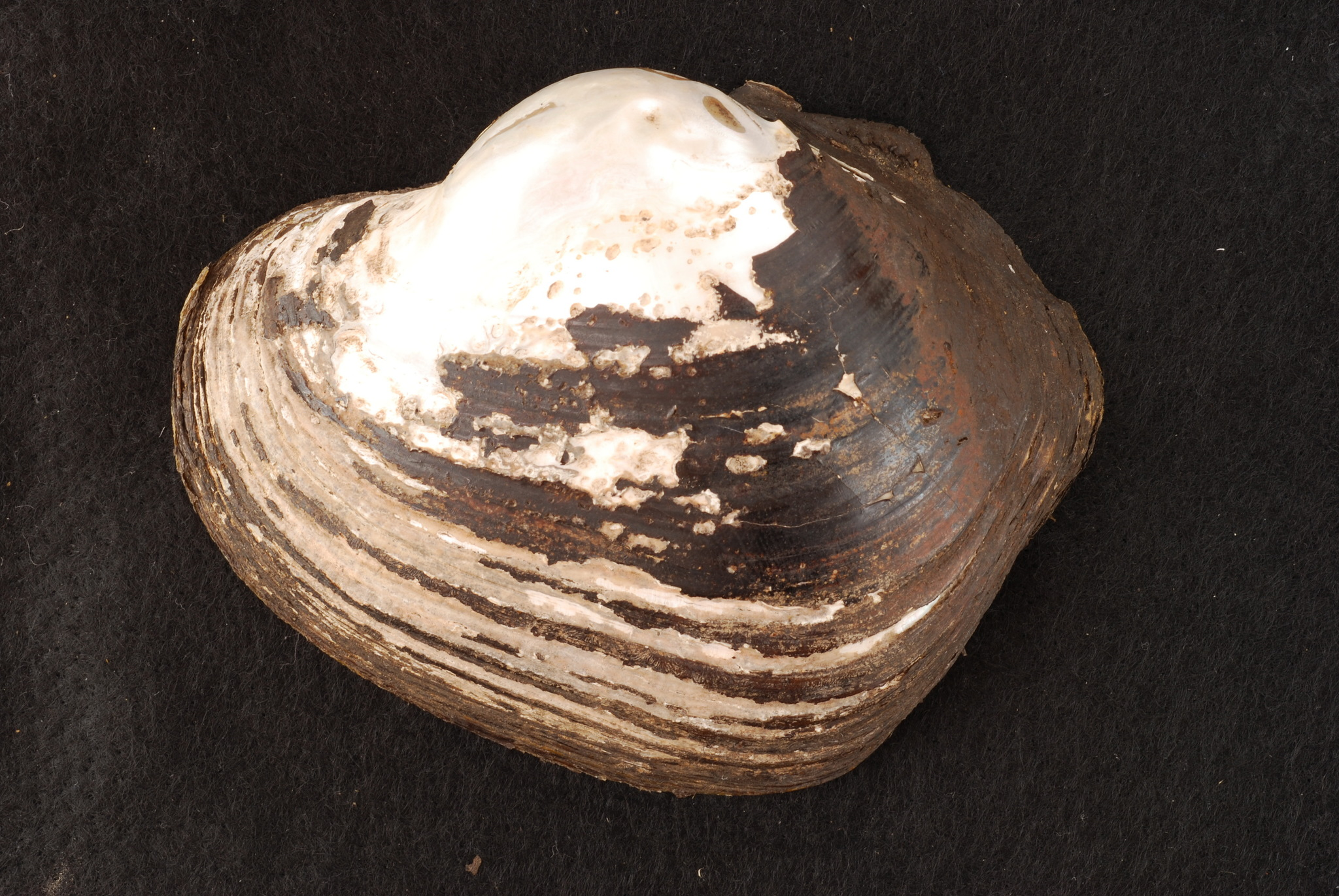
- From eastern Texas, US

Conservation status
- Near Threatened (IUCN 2.3)

- Imperiled (NatureServe)

Scientific classification
- Kingdom: Animalia
- Phylum: Mollusca
- Class: Bivalvia
- Order: Unionida
- Family: Unionidae
- Genus: Lampsilis
- Species: L. satura

Binomial name
- Lampsilis satura I. Lea, 1852

= Lampsilis satura =

Species of bivalve

Lampsilis satura, also known as the sandbank pocketbook, is a species of freshwater mussel, an aquatic bivalve mollusk in the family Unionidae, the river mussels. This species is endemic to the United States.
