= Lampsilis splendida =

Conservation status
- Least Concern (IUCN 3.1)

- Vulnerable (NatureServe)

Scientific classification
- Kingdom: Animalia
- Phylum: Mollusca
- Class: Bivalvia
- Order: Unionida
- Family: Unionidae
- Genus: Lampsilis
- Species: L. splendida

Binomial name
- Lampsilis splendida I. Lea, 1838

Species of bivalve

Lampsilis splendida is a species of freshwater mussel, an aquatic bivalve mollusk in the family Unionidae, the river mussels. This species is endemic to the United States.
