= Lampsilis dolabraeformis =

Conservation status
- Vulnerable (IUCN 2.3)

- Vulnerable (NatureServe)

Scientific classification
- Kingdom: Animalia
- Phylum: Mollusca
- Class: Bivalvia
- Order: Unionida
- Family: Unionidae
- Genus: Lampsilis
- Species: L. dolabraeformis

Binomial name
- Lampsilis dolabraeformis I. Lea, 1838

Species of bivalve

Lampsilis dolabraeformis is a species of freshwater mussel in the family Unionidae, the river mussels. It is known commonly as the Altamaha pocketbook. It is endemic to Georgia in the United States, where it is known only from the Altamaha River system.

The fish species eastern mosquitofish (Gambusia holbrooki) and largemouth bass (Micropteris salmoides) are hosts for the glochidia of this mussel.
