= Lampsilis floridensis =

Scientific classification
- Kingdom: Animalia
- Phylum: Mollusca
- Class: Bivalvia
- Order: Unionida
- Family: Unionidae
- Genus: Lampsilis
- Species: L. floridensis

Binomial name
- Lampsilis floridensis Lea, 1853

Lampsilis floridensis, also known as the Florida sandshell, is a freshwater mussel from Florida in the family Unionidae. It was first described in 1853.
