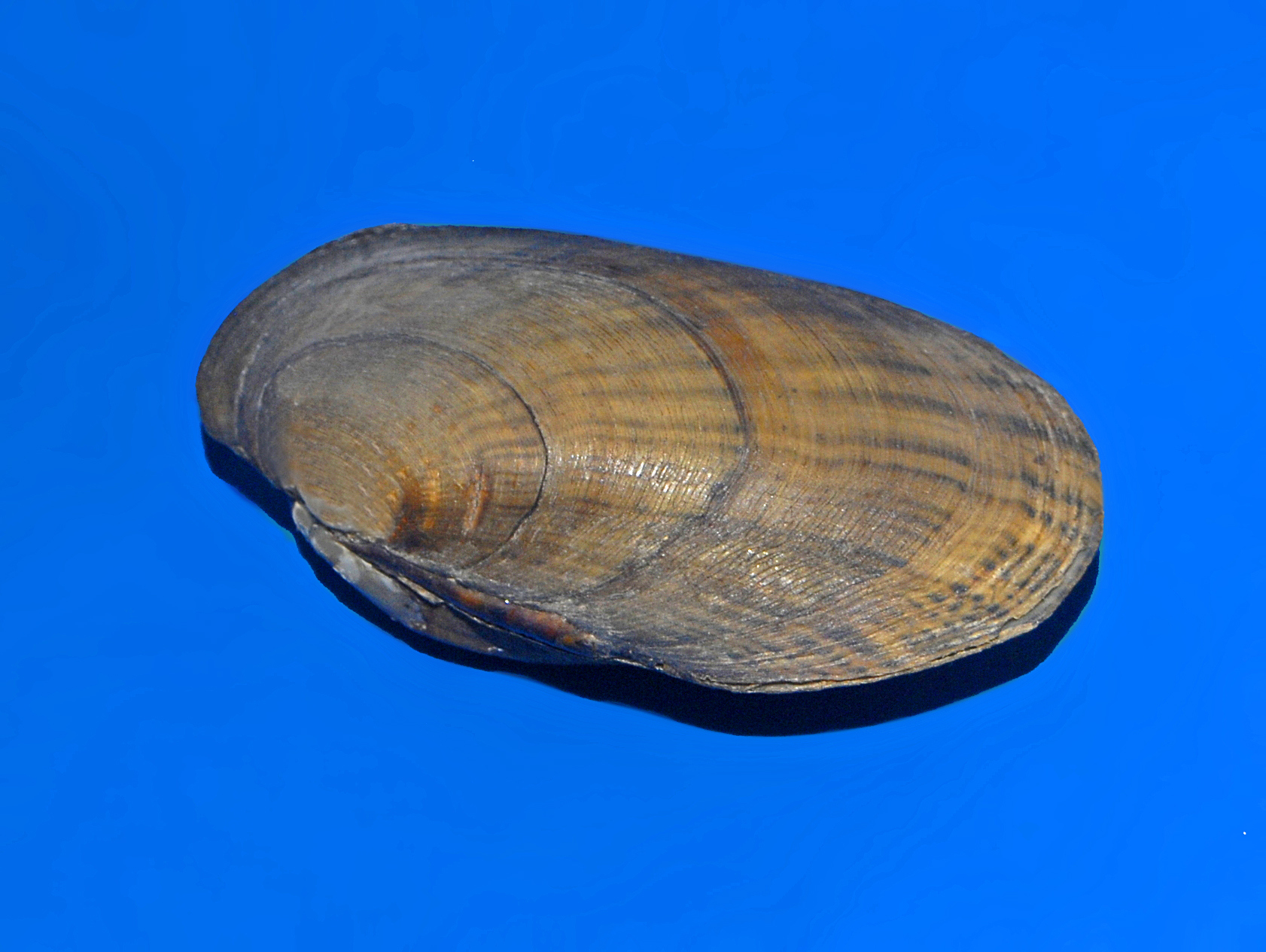
- Lampsilis siliquoidea on display at the Museo Civico di Storia Naturale di Milano

Conservation status
- Least Concern (IUCN 3.1)

- Secure (NatureServe)

Scientific classification
- Kingdom: Animalia
- Phylum: Mollusca
- Class: Bivalvia
- Order: Unionida
- Family: Unionidae
- Genus: Lampsilis
- Species: L. siliquoidea

Binomial name
- Lampsilis siliquoidea (Barnes, 1823)

= Lampsilis siliquoidea =

Species of bivalve

Lampsilis siliquoidea, also known as the fatmucket, is a species of freshwater bivalve in the family Unionidae.

== Description ==
Lampsilis siliquoidea is recognized by its brown shell with dark rays, and is usually about 70 millimetres (2.8 in) to 100 millimetres (3.9 in) in size. The shape of the shell is oblong to elliptical, compressed or inflated, with uniform thickness. Fatmucket clams are filter feeders. They feed on algae, phytoplankton, protozoans and organic particles. In the parasitic glochidial stage they feed on blood from hosts species, which include bass, perch, walleye, and sturgeon.

== Distribution and habitat ==
It is widespread in North America, found in the drainages of both the Mississippi River from New York to Minnesota, the Great Lakes, and Hudson Bay. It lives in lakes, rivers, streams and quiet waters, usually on sandy-mud bottoms.

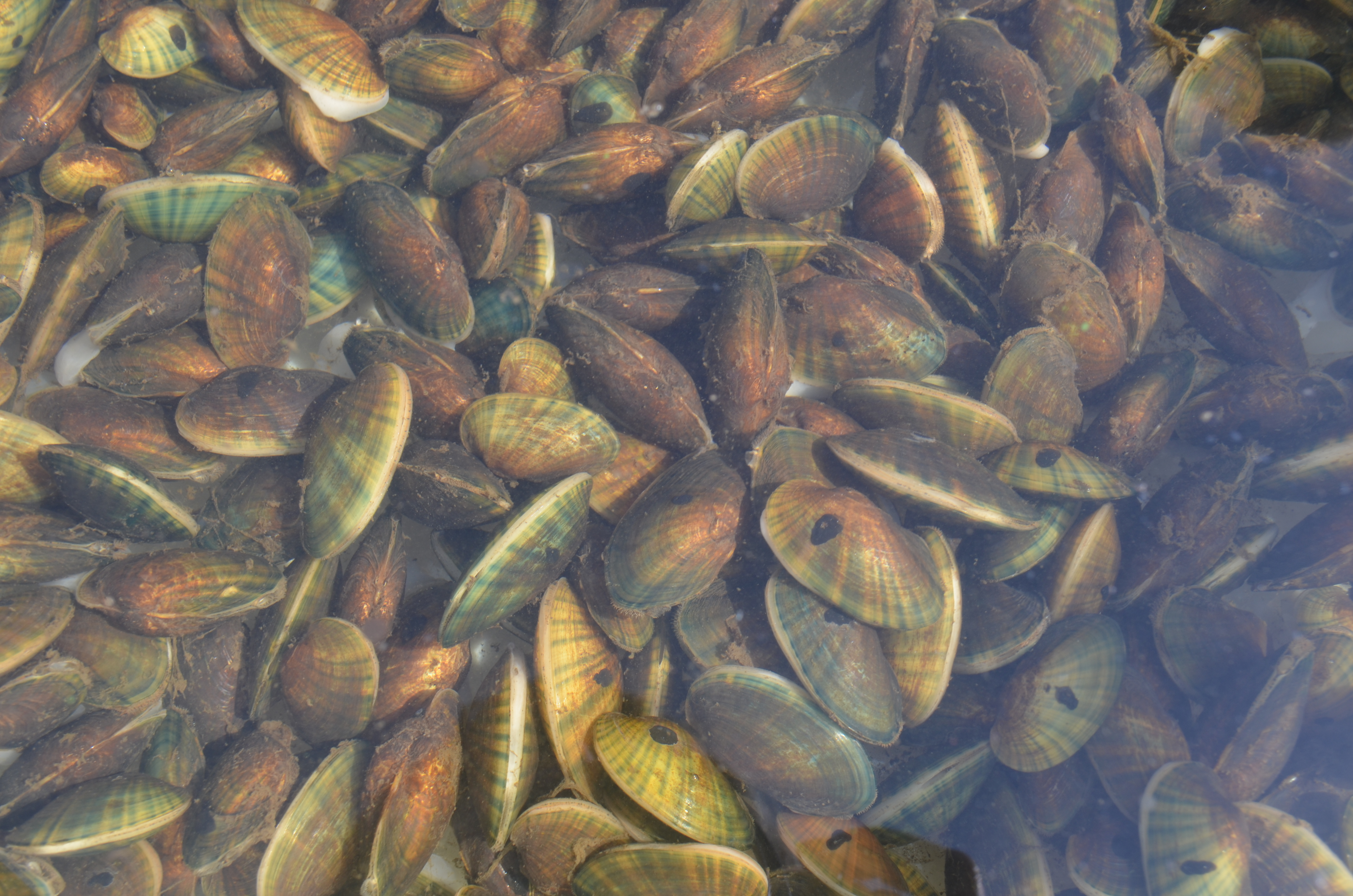
Live Lampsilis siliquoidea being tagged for research.
