= Ortmanniana ligamentina =

Conservation status
- Least Concern (IUCN 3.1)

- Secure (NatureServe)

Scientific classification
- Kingdom: Animalia
- Phylum: Mollusca
- Class: Bivalvia
- Order: Unionida
- Family: Unionidae
- Genus: Ortmanniana
- Species: O. ligamentina

Binomial name
- Ortmanniana ligamentina (Lamarck, 1819)

Synonyms
- List: Actinonaias carinata (Barnes, 1823); Actinonaias carinata calendis (Rafinesque, 1831); Actinonaias carinata carinata (Barnes, 1823); Actinonaias carinata gibba (Simpson, 1900); Actinonaias carinata orbis Morrison, 1942; Actinonaias carinata upsonii (Marsh, 1887); Actinonaias gibba (Simpson, 1900); Actinonaias ligamentina (Lamarck, 1819); Actinonaias ligamentina carinata (Barnes, 1823); Ellipsaria ligamentina (Lamarck, 1823); Ellipsaria ligamentina (Lamarck, 1819); Lampsilis (Eurynia) ligamentina (Lamarck, 1819); Lampsilis (Eurynia) ligamentina gibbus Simpson, 1900; Lampsilis (Eurynia) ligamentina nigrescens Simpson, 1914; Lampsilis (Eurynia) ligamentinus (Lamarck, 1819); Lampsilis (Eurynia) ligamentinus gibbus (Simpson, 1900); Lampsilis (Eurynia) pinguis (Lea, 1857); Lampsilis (Lampsilis) sowerbyana Frierson, 1927; Lampsilis (Ligumia) fasciata (Rafinesque, 1820); Lampsilis (Ortmanniana) carinata (Barnes, 1823); Lampsilis (Ortmanniana) carinata calendis (Rafinesque, 1831); Lampsilis (Ortmanniana) carinata carinata (Barnes, 1823); Lampsilis (Ortmanniana) carinata gibba (Simpson, 1900); Lampsilis (Ortmanniana) carinata orbis (Morrison, 1942); Lampsilis (Ortmanniana) carinata pinguis (Lea, 1857); Lampsilis (Ortmanniana) carinata upsoni (Marsh, 1887); Lampsilis (Ortmanniana) carinata upsonii (Marsh, 1887); Lampsilis (Ortmanniana) ligamentina (Lamarck, 1819); Lampsilis carinata (Barnes, 1823); Lampsilis ligamentina (Lamarck, 1819); Lampsilis ligamentina gibba (Simpson, 1900); Lampsilis ligamentinus (Lamarck, 1819); Ligumia carinata carinata (Barnes, 1823); Ligumia fasciata (Rafinesque, 1820); Margarita (Unio) crassus (Say, 1817); Margaron (Unio) ligamentinus (Lamarck, 1819); Margaron (Unio) pinguis (Lea, 1857); Mya gravis Wood, 1828; Obliquaria (Sintoxia) calendis Rafinesque, 1831; Obliquaria pallens Rafinesque, 1831; Unio (Elliptio) fasciata Rafinesque, 1820; Unio (Elliptio) fasciata alternata Rafinesque, 1820; Unio (Elliptio) fasciata cuprea Rafinesque, 1820; Unio (Elliptio) fasciata nigrofasciata Rafinesque, 1820; Unio carinatus Barnes, 1823; Unio crassus Say, 1817; Unio ellipticus Barnes, 1823; Unio fasciata Rafinesque, 1820; Unio ligamentina Lamarck, 1819; Unio ligamentinoides Lea, 1868; Unio pinguis Lea, 1857; Unio upsonii Marsh, 1887

Species of freshwater mussel native to North America

Ortmanniana ligamentina, commonly known as the mucket, is a species of freshwater mussel in the family Unionidae. It is native to eastern North America.

== Taxonomy and history ==
This species was described by Jean-Baptiste Lamarck in 1819 as Unio ligamentina, based on a type specimen from the Ohio River. The type is deposited in the Muséum national d’Histoire naturelle in Paris, France. Arnold Edward Ortmann transferred the species to the genus Actinonaias in a 1919 monograph published in the Memoirs of the Carnegie Museum, however, this placement was considered dubious, given that the type species of Actinonaias hails from Central America. Some authorities recognised two subspecies, A. ligamentina carinata and A. ligamentina ligamentina, but most workers did not differentiate between the two. A 2021 checklist of the order Unionida published in the Journal of Molluscan Studies transferred this species to the genus Ortmanniana, placing it in the tribe Lampsilini within the unionid subfamily Ambleminae and recognizing no infraspecific taxa.

It is one of several North American freshwater mussel species known by the common name mucket.

== Distribution and habitat ==
Native to eastern North America, Ortmanniana ligamentina is a widespread freshwater species known from the Mississippi River basin (including the Tennessee River and Cumberland River drainages), the St. Lawrence River basin, and the tributaries of Lake Erie, Lake Michigan, and Lake Ontario. This range includes waterways in the Canadian provinces of Ontario and Québec and the United States states of Alabama, Arkansas, Illinois, Indiana, Iowa, Kansas, Kentucky, Louisiana, Michigan, Minnesota, Mississippi, Missouri, Nebraska, New York, Ohio, Oklahoma, Pennsylvania, Tennessee, Virginia, West Virginia, and Wisconsin. It is typically found in rivers or creeks at depths of 1 m (3 ft 3 in) or less on cobble, gravel, sand, or mud substrates. It is often found in riffles with strong currents, but also occurs in gentler streams, lakes, and ponds.

== Description ==
Ortmanniana ligamentina is a large species of mussel, with adults reaching up to 140 mm (5.5 in) long. The stout shell may be oval, oblong, or elliptical in shape. The anterior end of the shell is broadly rounded, while the posterior end may be broadly rounded or somewhat pointed. The periostracum is light yellowish brown to greenish in color, becoming dark brown or dull olive yellow with age. The periostracum may also exhibit broad, interrupted or uninterrupted dark green rays, though these are not present in all specimens. The external surface of the shell is relatively smooth but often marked with irregular raised concentric ridges. The nacre is white, becoming iridescent towards the posterior end of the shell.

Sexual dimorphism is not often noticeable in this species, though some female specimens may exhibit a more inflated posterior. Young individuals may appear somewhat compressed, and the shell thickens with age.

== Ecology ==
Adult Ortmanniana ligamentina are filter feeders, consuming bacteria, plankton, and detritus suspended in the water column. The glochidia are parasites of freshwater fish, with known hosts including the American eel (Anguilla rostrata), banded killifish (Fundulus diaphanus), bluegill (Lepomis macrochirus), black crappie (Pomoxis nigromaculatus), white crappie (Pomoxis annularis), common carp (Cyprinus carpio), green sunfish (Lepomis cyanellus), orangespotted sunfish (Lepomis humilis), largemouth bass (Micropterus salmoides), smallmouth bass (Micropterus dolomieu), roach (Rutilus rutilus), rock bass (Ambloplites rupestris), sauger (Stizostedion canadense), silverjaw minnow (Ericymba buccata), tadpole madtom (Noturus gyrinus), Tippecanoe darter (Etheostoma tippecanoe), white bass (Marone chrysops), and yellow perch (Perea flavescens).

Breeding is reported to occur from August to May. Females are bradytictic and begin developing eggs in mid-summer, with glochidia present from September through May to August of the following year. Individuals may live for up to 25 years, reaching sexual maturity at approximately 4 to 6 years of age.
