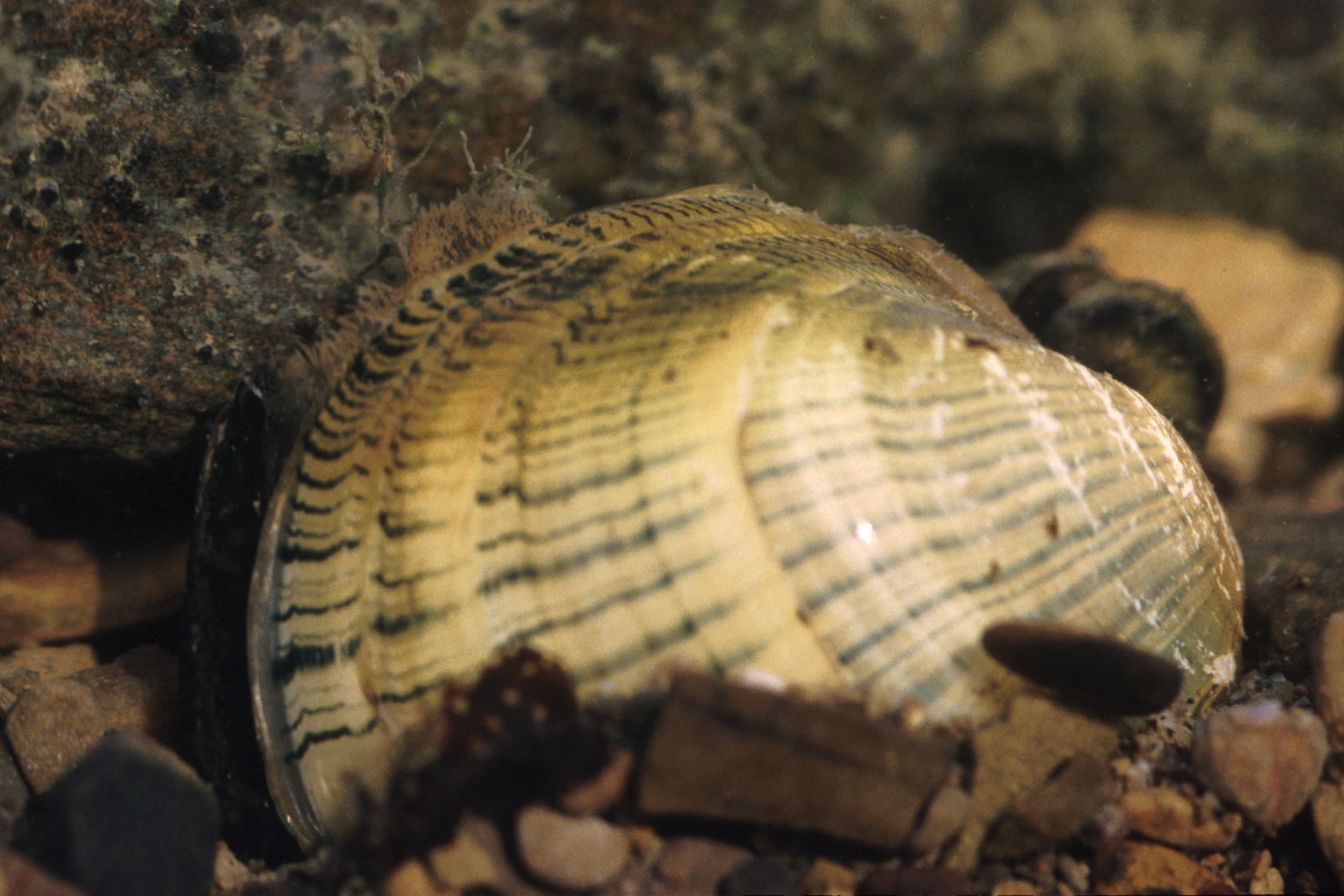

Conservation status
- Least Concern (IUCN 3.1)

- Apparently Secure (NatureServe)

Scientific classification
- Kingdom: Animalia
- Phylum: Mollusca
- Class: Bivalvia
- Order: Unionida
- Family: Unionidae
- Genus: Lampsilis
- Species: L. fasciola

Binomial name
- Lampsilis fasciola Rafinesque, 1820

= Lampsilis fasciola =

Species of bivalve

Lampsilis fasciola, the wavy-rayed lampmussel, is a species of freshwater mussel, an aquatic bivalve mollusk in the family Unionidae, the river mussels.

== Description ==
Aggressive mimicry: attracting fish hosts by using its mantle as a lure.

The wavy-rayed lampmussel is a relatively small mussel distributed throughout Southern Ontario and the North-Eastern sections of the United States. The mussel is characterized by its yellow to yellowish-green colour. The mussel receives its name from the numerous thin wavy rays that cover its shell. These waves can be thin and separate or coalesced into significantly wider rays. The beak is slightly elevated above the hinge lines and the beak sculpture consists of 3 to 5 wavy lines. The shell is compressed to inflated (females) in shape and the anterior end is rounded with the posterior end bluntly pointed in males and rounded in females. The mussel's nacre is typically white or bluish, and the shell in general is rounded and generally symmetrical over the axis. The shell is mostly smooth, excepting certain wrinkles and growth rests that may appear. Wavy-rayed Lampmussles are typically less than 75 millimetres (3.0 in), but have been known to grow up to 90 to 100 millimetres (3.5 to 3.9 in) in length.

== Habitat ==
Wavy-rayed lampmussels are historically distributed throughout Southern Ontario as well as 13 U.S. States including the Ohio watershed. In Ontario the mussel has been confirmed in at least four watersheds: the Ausable, Grand, Maitland and Thames river. Mussels live in gravel and sand bottoms in medium-sized streams but are particularly sensitive to changes in their environment. Typically the mussels are found in streams with good currents, and near to riffles, and are rarely found in medium-sized rivers. Like many mussels, the larvae of this species are parasitic and affix themselves to fish hosts. At this stage the larvae consume nutrients from the fish body until they develop into juvenile mussels, and drop off. Fish hosts used by the wavy-rayed lampmussel include the largemouth bass and the smallmouth bass. These fish hosts are especially important to ensure healthy mussel populations.

== Threats ==
Like many fresh water mussels, the wavy-rayed lampmussel is extremely sensitive to changes in water quality. This includes chemical contaminants entering its habitat such as copper, ammonia and chloride, particularly during their glochidial and juvenile life phases. This, along with loss of habitat has caused a continuous decrease in the mussel's populations. Additionally, the introduction of the invasive zebra mussel has resulted in even greater reductions in population. By affixing themselves to hard surfaces the zebra mussels are in direct competition with wavy-rayed lampmussels, and impair their ability to feed, reproduce and move. Smaller population may also be affected by predation by muskrats. Like other mussels, other threats to the wavy-rayed lampmussel include: natural flow alterations, siltation, channel disturbance, point and non-point source pollution, and exotic species (including the aforementioned zebra mussel). Maintenance or establishment of vegetated riparian buffers can help protect mussel habitats from many of their threats.

== Conservation status ==
The Canadian Species at Risk Act listed it in the List of Wildlife Species at Risk as being endangered in Canada. In 2010 the status of the wavy-rayed lampmussel was reassessed for downgrading due to increased populations. Currently it is listed as "Special Concern" under SARA, as of March 2013, and "Special Concern" under COSEWIC, as of April 2010.
