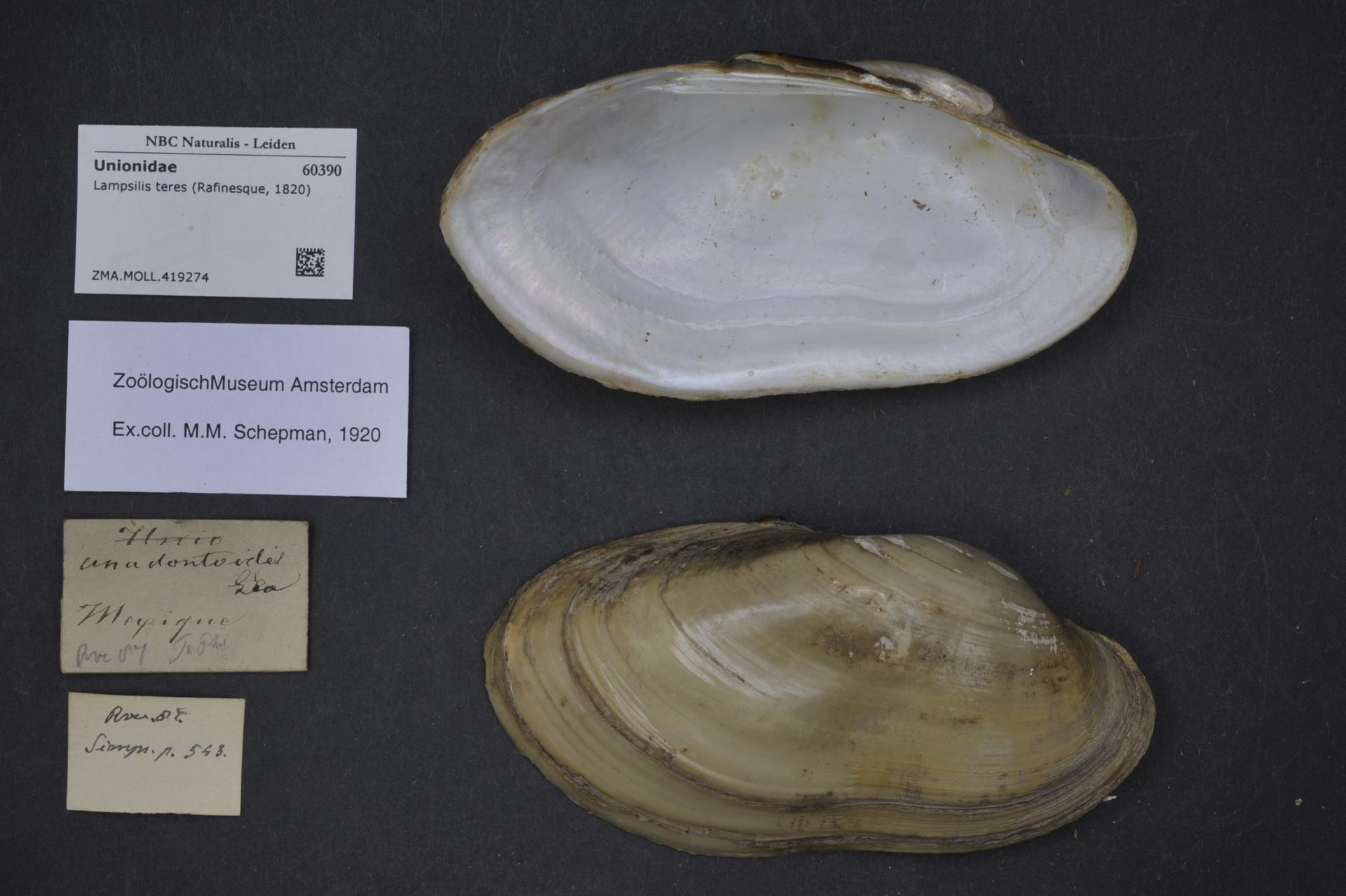

Conservation status
- Least Concern (IUCN 3.1)

- Secure (NatureServe)

Scientific classification
- Kingdom: Animalia
- Phylum: Mollusca
- Class: Bivalvia
- Order: Unionida
- Family: Unionidae
- Genus: Lampsilis
- Species: L. teres

Binomial name
- Lampsilis teres (Rafinesque, 1820)

Synonyms
- List: Lampsilis (Simpsonunio) anodontoides (I.Lea, 1831); Lampsilis anodontoides (I.Lea, 1834); Lampsilis anodontoides subsp. fallaciosa (H.M.Smith, 1899); Lampsilis fallaciosa (H.M.Smith, 1899); Lampsilis fallaciosus H.M.Smith, 1899; Lampsilis teres subsp. anodontoides (I.Lea, 1831); Lampsilis (Ligumia) teres subsp. fallaciosa (H.M.Smith, 1899); Lampsilis teres subsp. teres (Rafinesque, 1820); Ligumia teres (Rafinesque, 1820); Margarita (Unio) anodontoides (I.Lea, 1831); Margaron (Unio) anodontoides (I.Lea, 1831); Unio anodontoides I.Lea, 1831; Unio (Eurynia) teres Rafinesque, 1820

= Lampsilis teres =

Species of bivalve

Lampsilis teres, the yellow sandshell or slough sandshell, is a freshwater mussel native to the United States and Mexico. Although it is considered a species of least concern on the IUCN Red List, it is extirpated from (locally extinct) and endangered in parts of its range.
