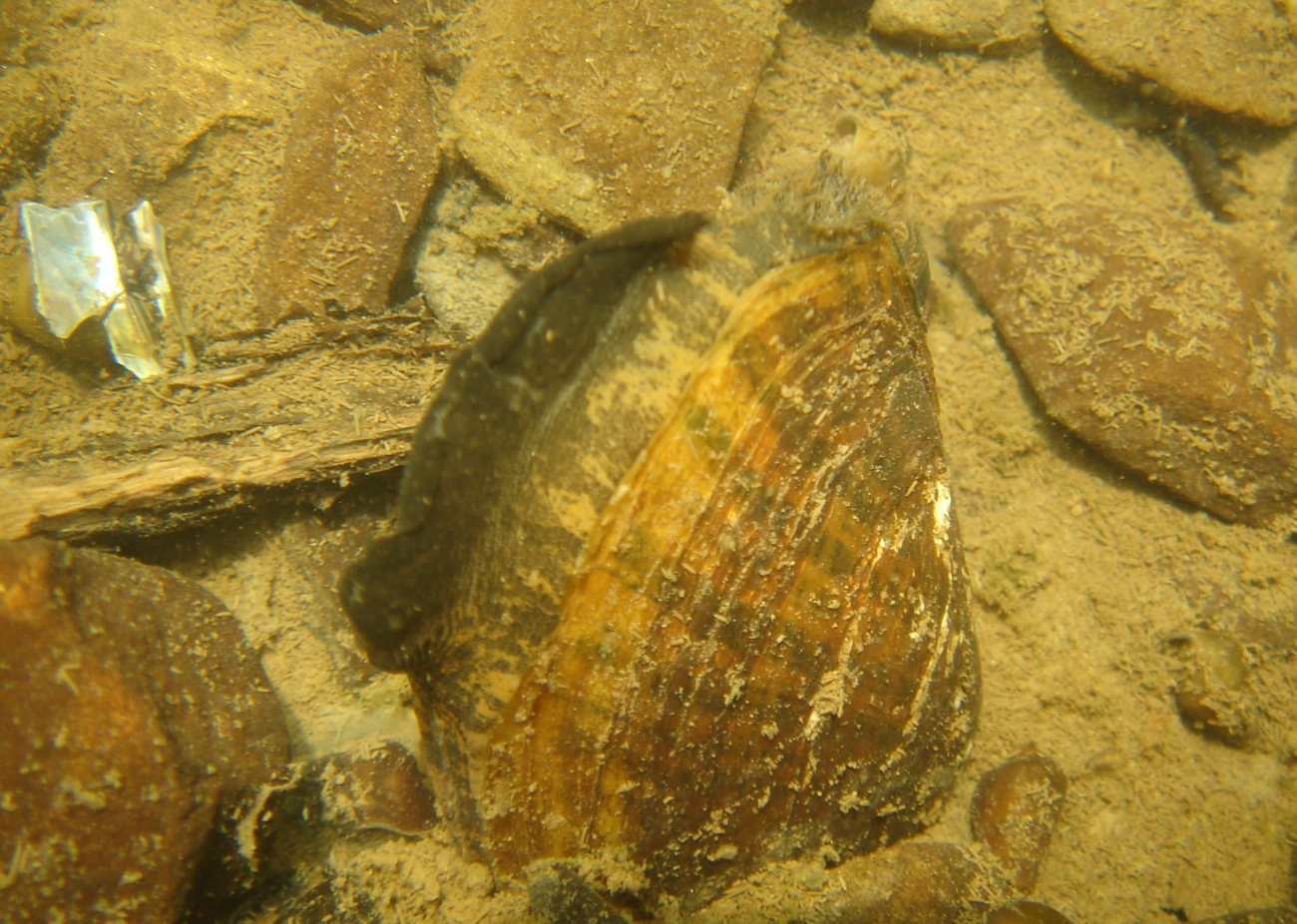

Conservation status
- Critically Endangered (IUCN 2.3)

- Imperiled (NatureServe)

Scientific classification
- Kingdom: Animalia
- Phylum: Mollusca
- Class: Bivalvia
- Order: Unionida
- Family: Unionidae
- Genus: Lampsilis
- Species: L. streckeri

Binomial name
- Lampsilis streckeri Frierson, 1927

= Lampsilis streckeri =

Species of bivalve

Lampsilis streckeri, the speckled pocketbook, is a species of freshwater mussel in the family Unionidae, the river mussels. It is endemic to Arkansas in the United States, where it is threatened by habitat loss. It is a federally listed endangered species of the United States.

This mussel is about 8 centimetres (3.1 in) long. It is dark yellow to brown and has chevron-shaped spots and chainlike rays. It is sexually dimorphic, the females being more rounded at the posterior.

When this species was placed on the Endangered Species List it was limited to a six-mile (9.7 km) stretch of the Middle Fork of the Little Red River in Arkansas. The damming of the river to form the Greers Ferry Reservoir changed the hydrology of the river, altering the habitat.

Since its listing several additional populations have been discovered in the river.

== See also ==
- Yellowcheek darter (Etheostoma moorei): Also endemic to the Little Red River in Arkansas

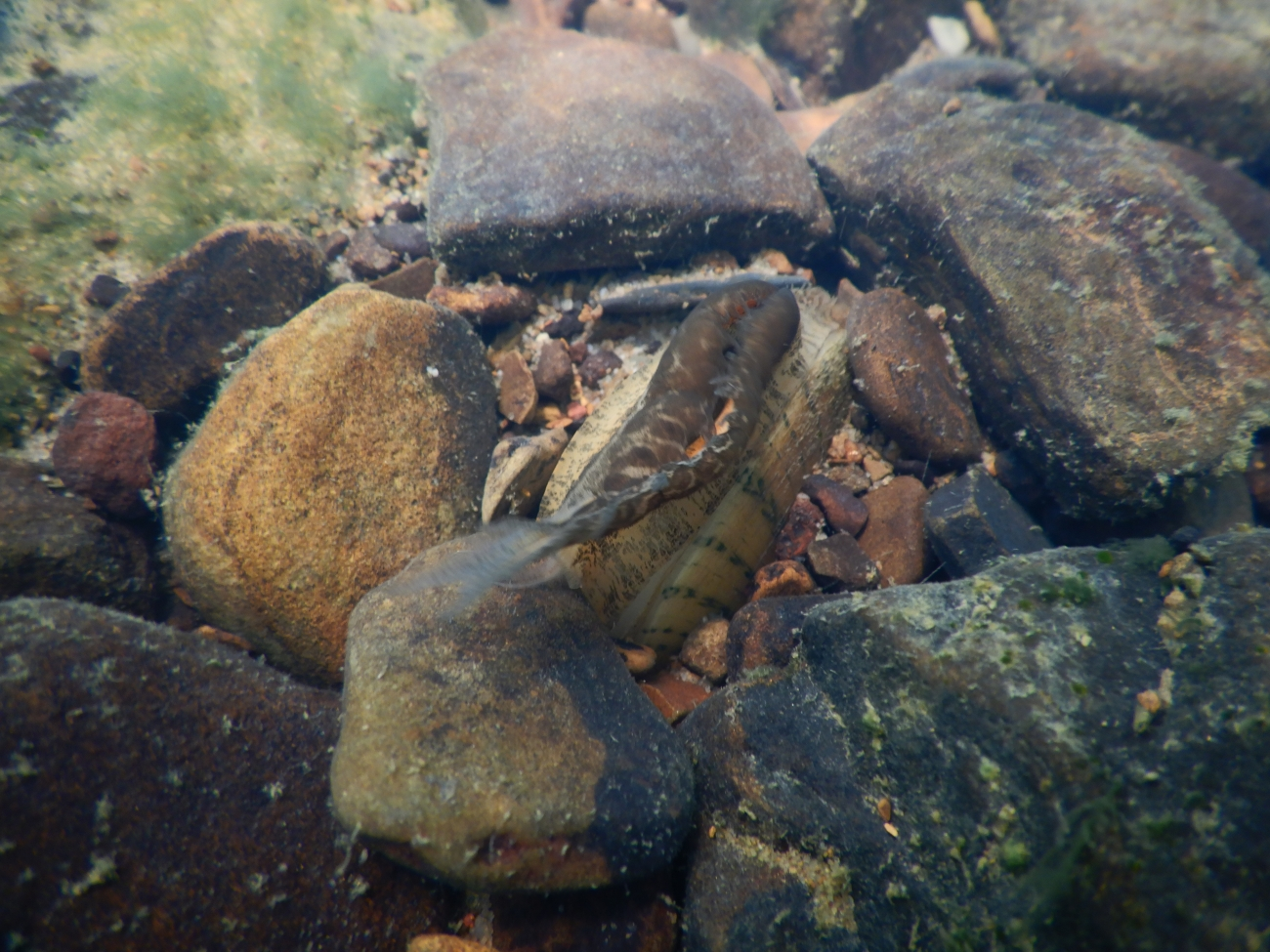
A female speckled pocketbook mussel (Lampsilis streckeri) displaying the fish-shaped lure she uses to attract a host fish for her parasitic young.
