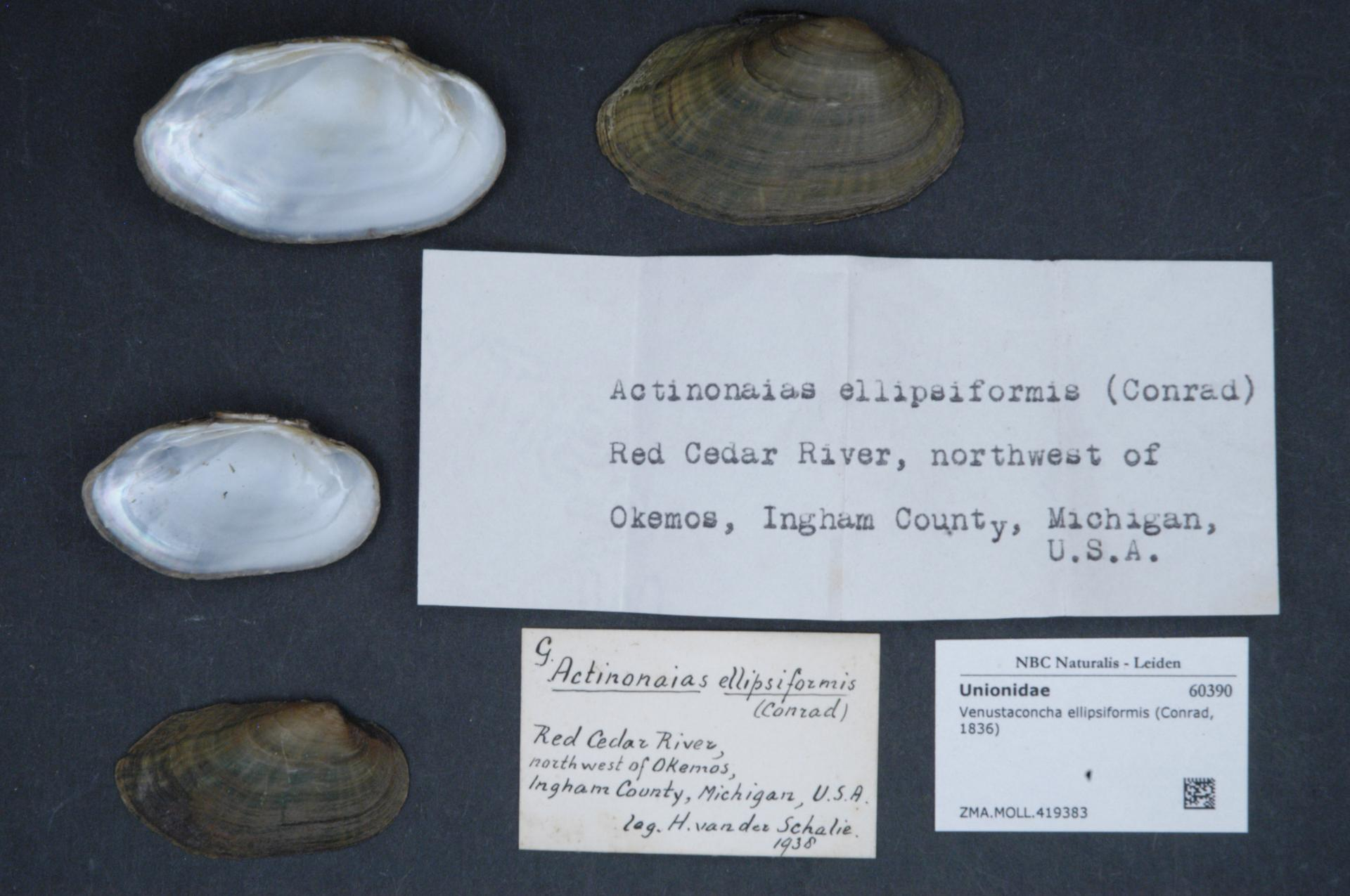

Conservation status
- Least Concern (IUCN 3.1)

- Apparently Secure (NatureServe)

Scientific classification
- Kingdom: Animalia
- Phylum: Mollusca
- Class: Bivalvia
- Order: Unionida
- Family: Unionidae
- Genus: Venustaconcha
- Species: V. ellipsiformis

Binomial name
- Venustaconcha ellipsiformis (Conrad, 1836)

Synonyms
- List: Actinonaias ellipsiformis (Conrad, 1836); Eurynia (Micromya) ellipsiformis (Conrad, 1836); Eurynia (Micromya) venusta (Lea, 1838); Lampsilis (Eurynia) ellipsiformis (Conrad, 1836); Lampsilis (Eurynia) venusta (Lea, 1838); Lampsilis (Eurynia) venustus (Lea, 1838); Lampsilis (Ligumia) ellipsiformis (Conrad, 1836); Lampsilis (Venusta) ellipsiformis (Conrad, 1836); Lampsilis (Venusta) venusta (Lea, 1838); Lampsilis (Venustaconcha) ellipsiformis (Conrad, 1836); Lampsilis (Venustaconcha) venusta (Lea, 1838); Lampsilis venusta (Lea, 1838); Ligumia (Micromya) ellipsiformis (Conrad, 1836); Margarita (Unio) venustus (Lea, 1838); Margaron (Unio) spatulatus (Lea, 1845); Margaron (Unio) venustus (Lea, 1838); Unio ellipsiformis Conrad, 1836; Unio iridescens Conrad, 1838; Unio spatulatus Lea, 1845; Unio venustus Lea, 1838; Venustaconcha ellipsiformis ellipsiformis (Conrad, 1836)

= Venustaconcha ellipsiformis =

Species of bivalve mollusc from North America

Venustaconcha ellipsiformis, the ellipse, is a species of bivalves belonging to the family Unionidae.

The ellipse is found in the upper Mississippi drainage from southern Michigan, Indiana, Illinois, central Wisconsin, southeastern Minnesota, and eastern Iowa. It is also found in tributaries of the Missouri and Mississippi River system in the northeastern part of the Ozark plateaus in Missouri west to the Neosho River of the Arkansas River drainage.
