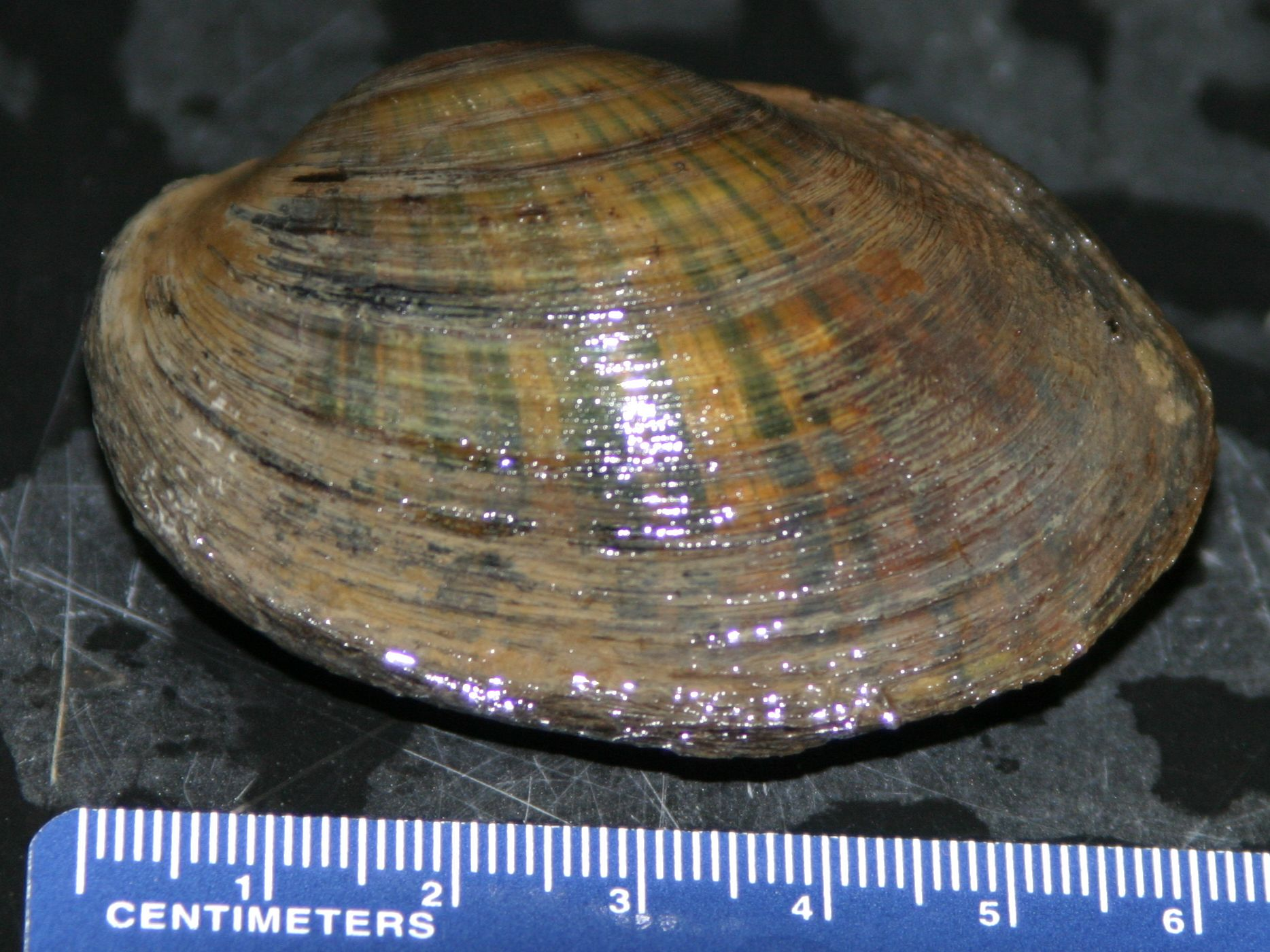
- Specimen collected from Missisquoi Bay

Conservation status
- Secure (NatureServe)

Scientific classification
- Kingdom: Animalia
- Phylum: Mollusca
- Class: Bivalvia
- Order: Unionida
- Family: Unionidae
- Genus: Lampsilis
- Species: L. radiata

Binomial name
- Lampsilis radiata (Gmelin, 1791)

Synonyms
- Lampsilis luteola (Lamarck, 1819)

= Lampsilis radiata =

Eastern lampmussel

Species of bivalve

Lampsilis radiata, also known as the eastern lampmussel, is a species of freshwater mussel in the family Unionidae. It is native to the north Atlantic coast of North America.

== Taxonomy ==
Lampsilis radiata was described in 1791 by Johann Friedrich Gmelin.

== Description ==
The eastern lampmussel is a medium-to-large-sized mussel, averaging around 3.9 in (9.9 cm) in length and rarely exceeding 5 in (13 cm). The shell is slightly ovate and elliptical. The valves, when looked at in cross-section, are moderately inflated. The bottom of the back of the shell is also commonly more rounded in mature females. Females tend to be more inflated and ovate as well. The periostracum of juveniles is usually yellow-green, while in adults it is green-brown, yellow-brown, or brown-black. Dark green lines cover the whole shell, extending outwards. The inside of the shell is usually a white, blue-white, pink, or salmon color. The hinge teeth are visible, with four on the left valve and three on the right valve. It may be confused with the eastern elliptio.

== Distribution and habitat ==
The eastern lampmussel is native to the Atlantic Coastline of North America, from Nova Scotia to South Carolina. It can also be found in the Great Lakes. It inhabits streams, rivers, ponds, and lakes. It prefers to be on sand or gravel but can be found on many other substrates. In lakes, it is found in the littoral zone, exposed to waves, and below 30 ft (9.1 m), in sandy and muddy pools. It favors cool and warm temperatures, with the freshwater pearl mussel being more common in cold waters.

== Behavior ==
Eastern lampmussels are filter feeders and strain plankton and bacteria from water columns.

To reproduce, the eastern lampmussel takes host to a fish for its larvae to feed on. There are many species it can use, including rock bass, pumpkinseed, bluegill, smallmouth bass, longear sunfish, largemouth bass, white perch, sand shiner, yellow perch, bluntnose minnow, and black crappie. Eggs are fertilized in mid-to-late summer, and the larvae are released in the spring.

== Conservation ==
The eastern lampmussel has not been assessed for the IUCN Red List, but its NatureServe conservation status is G5, representing a secure status. It is a stable species, however, as it can survive in many different conditions and uses a wide variety of fish species for reproduction. The mussel is at risk of being extirpated in states south of New York due to a small population caused by lesser habitat suitability. Zebra mussels are a threat to the South Nation River population.
