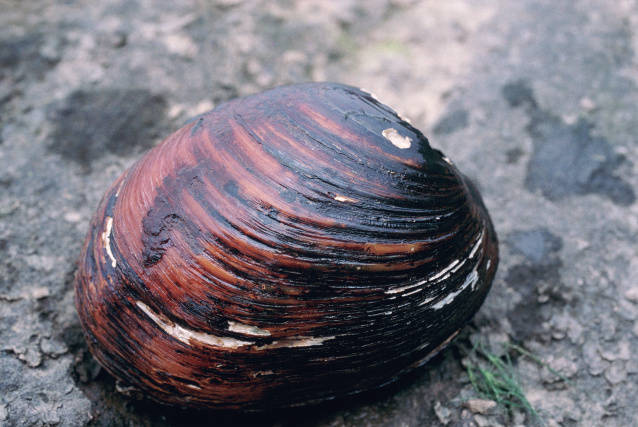

Conservation status
- Vulnerable (IUCN 3.1)

- Critically Imperiled (NatureServe)

Scientific classification
- Kingdom: Animalia
- Phylum: Mollusca
- Class: Bivalvia
- Order: Unionida
- Family: Unionidae
- Genus: Lampsilis
- Species: L. abrupta

Binomial name
- Lampsilis abrupta Say, 1831

= Lampsilis abrupta =

Species of bivalve

Lampsilis abrupta, the pink mucket or pink mucket pearly mussel, is a species of freshwater mussel, an aquatic bivalve mollusk in the family Unionidae, the river mussels. This species is endemic to the United States.

== Life history ==
The pink mucket is a rounded, slightly elongated mussel with a thick, inflated, and smooth shell, which is usually yellow-brown in color. It can be found on the bottoms of various bodies of water, among gravel and cobble. It can be found in water one inch to five feet in depth. The mussel can live up to fifty years, but it rarely reaches this age now. The pink mucket has been a federally endangered species since 1976.

The pink mucket reproduces in a similar manner to most other freshwater mussels: the male releases sperm into the water, and the female siphons it into its gill chamber for fertilization. Once the eggs have gone through this process, they mature into larvae before being discharged into the water. The larvae lodge into the gills of fish, such as black bass and walleye, where they further mature before breaking away and floating to the water bottom. The pink mucket spawns and fertilizes during the latter half of the year, and larvae are released at the start of the year.

As of 2019, the pink mucket is present in twenty-nine rivers and streams in the United States.

== Threats ==
The biggest threats to the pink mucket are reservoirs and dams. Recognized threats also include dredging, mining, logging, and channeling. These threats cause changes in water quality and temperature, which mussels are particularly sensitive to and unable to adapt.

== Recovery efforts ==
Protection and management of the pink mucket is related to managing the habitat and the water quality of the large rivers it depends upon. The state of Kentucky has created the Kentucky's Wildlife Action Plan. This plan was developed by the state to help create priority conservation actions for the aquatic and wildlife that have become threatened and endangered. In 2014, the Kentucky Department of Fish and Wildlife Resources reared pink mucket mussels at the Center for Mollusk Conservation and released eleven hundred pink muckets in the Green River. The states of Tennessee and Alabama have designated mussel sanctuaries in parts of the Cumberland and Tennessee Rivers and have also successfully reproduced populations at these locations.
