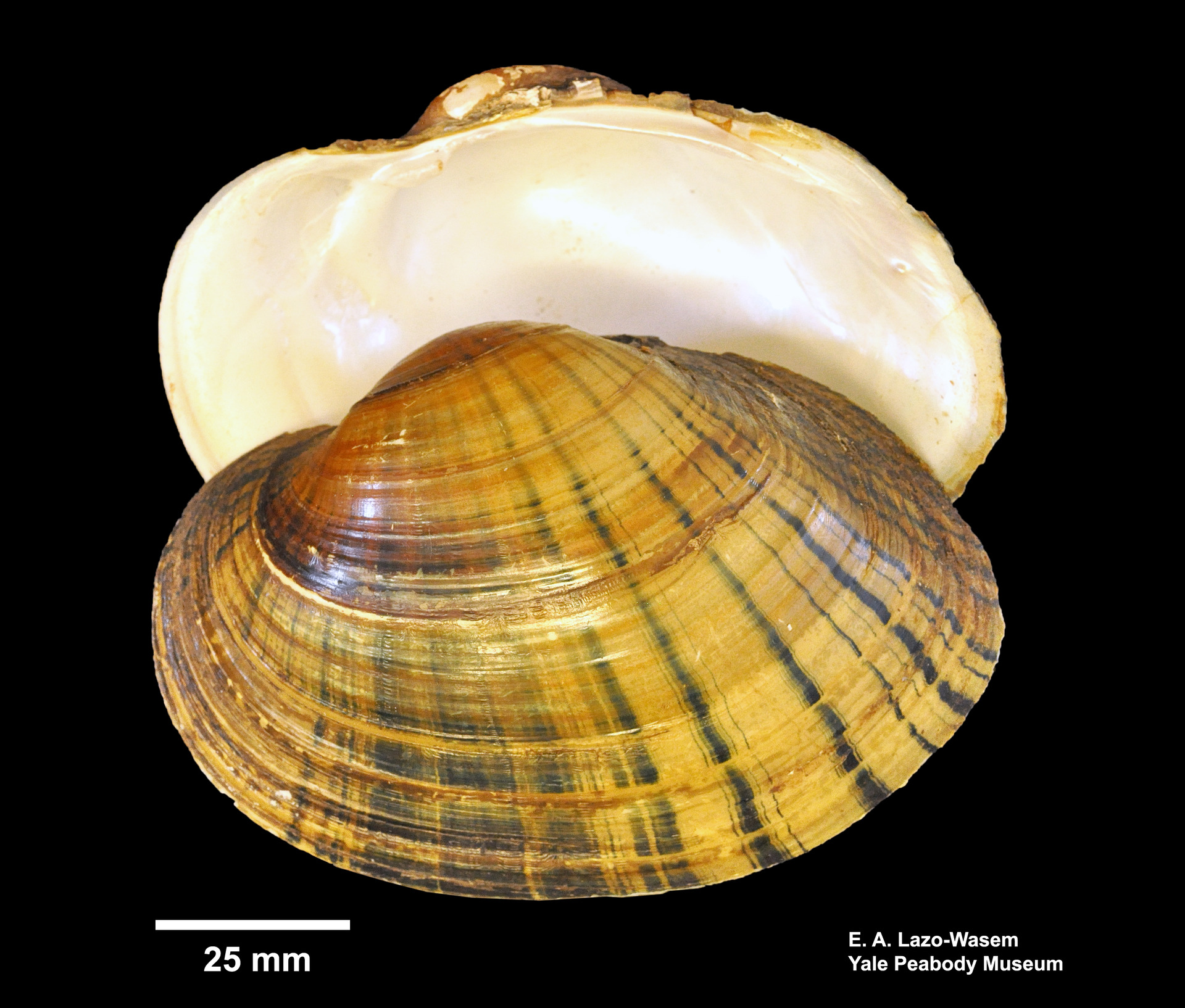

Conservation status
- Least Concern (IUCN 3.1)

- Secure (NatureServe)

Scientific classification
- Kingdom: Animalia
- Phylum: Mollusca
- Class: Bivalvia
- Order: Unionida
- Family: Unionidae
- Genus: Lampsilis
- Species: L. cardium

Binomial name
- Lampsilis cardium Rafinesque, 1820

= Lampsilis cardium =

Species of bivalve

Lampsilis cardium is a species of freshwater mussel in the family Unionidae, the river mussels. It is known commonly as the plain pocketbook. It is widespread in eastern North America, where it is native to the Mississippi River and Great Lakes drainage systems.

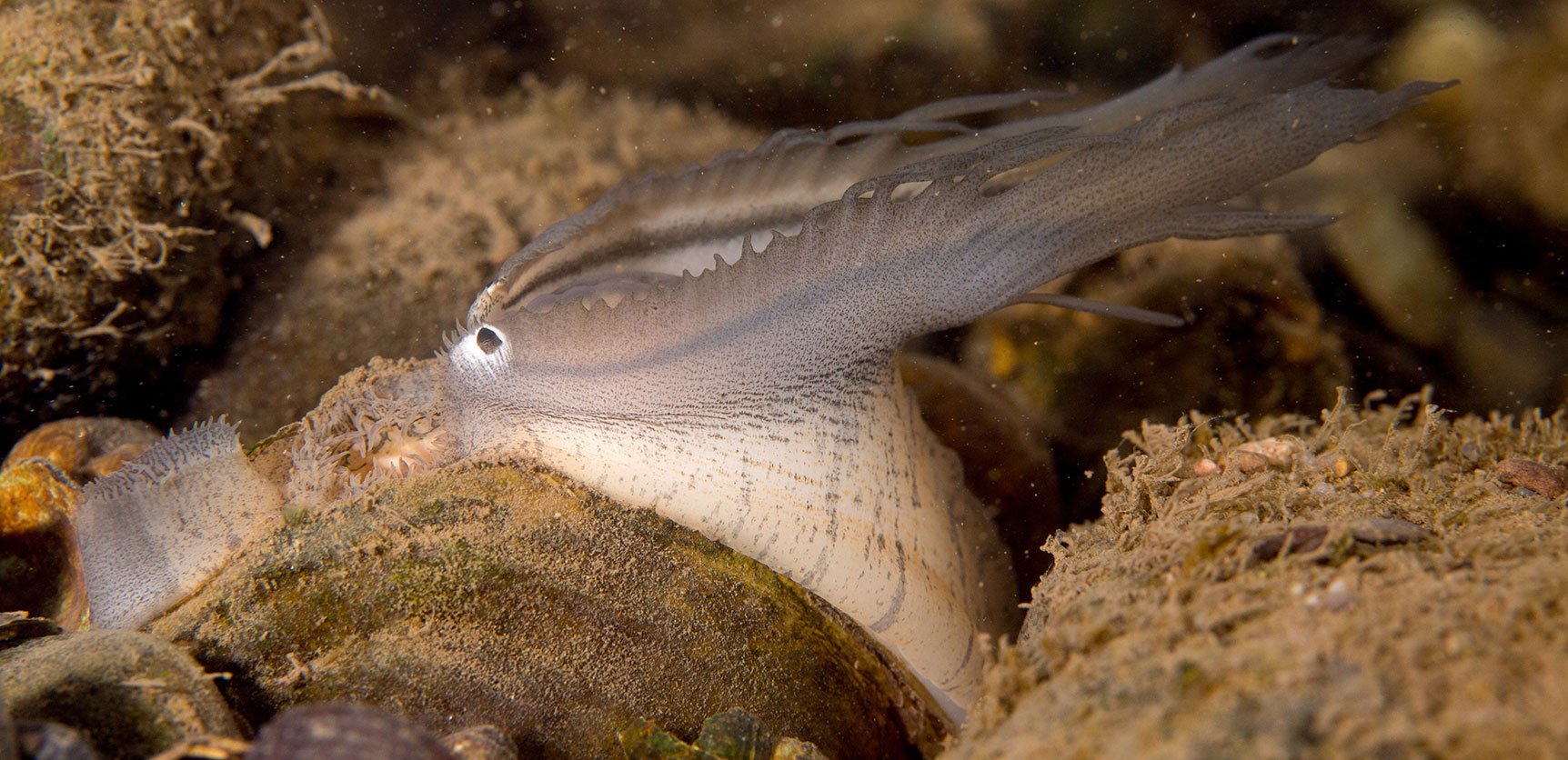
Lampsilis cardium displaying a mantle lure in the Potomac River.

== Reproduction ==
All Unionidae are known to use the gills, fins, or skin of a host fish for nutrients during the larval glochidia stage. Lampsilis cardium accomplishes this by having the inner sides of its mantle flaps marked with longitudinal stripes, resembling a small fish of the genus Notropis. When these are attacked and ruptured by a striking predatory fish, especially Micropterus coosae, the mussel larvae are released into the gills of the host fish, where they feed and develop.
