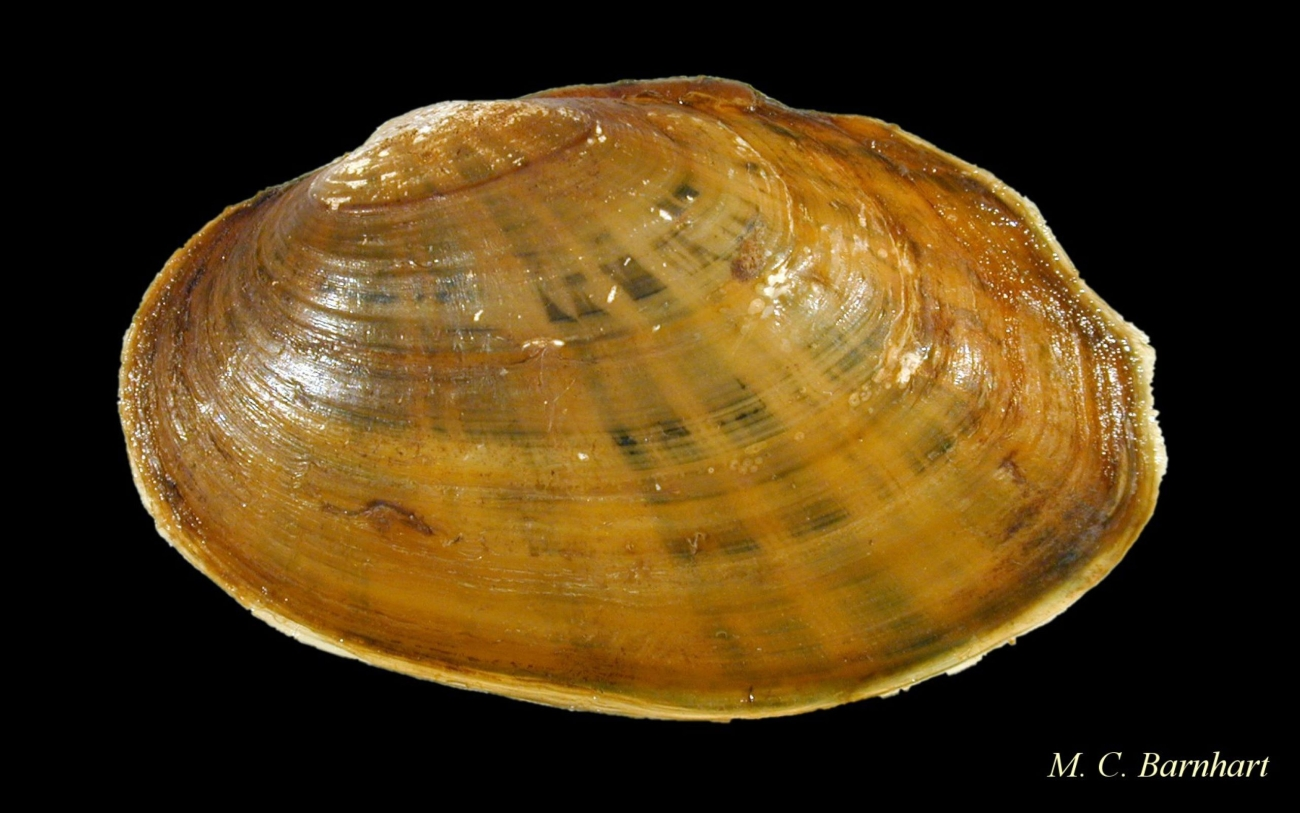

Conservation status
- Endangered (IUCN 3.1)

- Critically Imperiled (NatureServe)
- Endangered (ESA)

Scientific classification
- Kingdom: Animalia
- Phylum: Mollusca
- Class: Bivalvia
- Order: Unionida
- Family: Unionidae
- Genus: Lampsilis
- Species: L. rafinesqueana

Binomial name
- Lampsilis rafinesqueana Frierson, 1927

Synonyms
- Lampsilis (Lampsilis) rafinesqueana Frierson, 1927; Actinonaias rafinesqueana (Frierson, 1927)

= Lampsilis rafinesqueana =

Species of bivalve

Lampsilis rafinesqueana, the Neosho mucket or Neosho pearly mussel, is a species of North American freshwater mussel endemic to Arkansas, Oklahoma, Illinois, Missouri and Kansas.

== Description ==
The Neosho mucket was first described by Frierson in 1927 from specimens collected in Oklahoma from the Illinois River. It is notably larger than other freshwater mussel species in its range and can measure just over 100mm in shell length. Males are slightly larger in most bodily measurements than females. In Frierson's original species description, he reported the shell lengths of males and females as 93mm and 86mm respectively; and the male and female shell diameters as 38mm and 35mm respectively. Shell height in other specimens has been recorded as 62mm in males and 60mm in females, and is estimated to be 0.58 – 0.7 times the shell length. The low umbones project only slightly or not at all above the dorsal side of the shell.

The relatively smooth shell epidermis is colored brown to dull yellowish green. Faint, green, broken, chevron-shaped rays are sometimes seen lining the shell and serve as a useful identification feature if present; but are commoner and brighter on young specimens. In older specimens, the raying is often non-distinct and sometimes completely absent. The nacre is bluish-white or creamy. In the left valve are two equally long, stout, triangular pseudocardinal teeth; and two short, slightly curved lateral teeth. In the right valve are one strong tooth in front of the umbo and one smaller tooth before it.

Viewed from the side, either both the ventral and dorsal margins are regularly curved, or one margin straight and the other curved; with a regularly rounded anterior end common to both sexes. This mussel is however sexually dimorphic. In males, the posterior end points angularly down below the shell's medial line; so that the shell appears elliptical. Conversely, the posterior end in females is widely inflated due to presence of marsupial gills, making the entire shell ovate and taller posteriorly than in males. The male's elliptical shell, especially in the absence of the green chevrons lining it, may make it confusable with the similar species A.ligamentina.

This mussel's specific appearance and morphology appears to vary in different sections of its habitat and range. For example, in a survey of the Spring River system in Missouri, shell length in specimens of both sexes was significantly longer in the main Spring River than in Shoal Creek. The shells of individuals from Shoal Creek also appear to be relatively thin and compressed, compared to heavy and thick in specimens from other rivers.

This species has been frequently misidentified as other similar American freshwater mussels, especially before Frierson first described it in 1927. For example, it was formerly recognized as Lampsilis ligamentina; which probably arose from confusion with the superficially similar species Actinonaias ligamentina. The Neosho mucket has previously been frequently regarded as this species in historical surveys of the Neosho and Verdigris basins in Kansas. However, these two species are currently claimed to have non-overlapping distributions within this state.

== Ecology ==
=== Geographic range ===
The Neosho mucket occurs endemically in the Neosho, Spring, Verdigris, Illinois and Elk River basins (collectively the Arkansas River System) covering southeast Kansas, northeast Oklahoma, southwest Missouri and northwest Arkansas. Although populations have persisted in these states, this mussel's range is declining, and probably no longer lives in the Elk basin, being restricted to the remaining four.

Its historical range (partly still inhabited) includes Shoal and Center Creek and the Elk, North Fork Spring, and Spring Rivers in Missouri; the Verdigris, Neosho, Spring, Fall, Big Caney, Elk and Cottonwood Rivers and Walnut, Otter, Middle and Shoal Creeks in Kansas; the Verdigris, Neosho, Spring, Big Caney, Elk and Illinois Rivers in Oklahoma; and the northwest portion of the Illinois River in Arkansas. The Illinois River is reportedly the only river in Arkansas in which this mussel lives. However, occurrences within Arkansas have also been reported in the Baron Fork System.

In Kansas, it appears to be already largely extirpated from the Cottonwood River and some of its tributaries, and from Shoal and Center Creeks; but persists in large stretches of the Verdigris, Neosho and North Fork Spring Rivers. It was also previously reported locally extinct from the Fall River, although captive juveniles reared in restoration projects have now been successfully reintroduced to this river. Within Kansas, population densities are reportedly considerably higher in the Spring River than in other streams. This may be because of the Neosho mucket's apparent ability to securely anchor itself in the suitably loose substratum of the Spring River along with the markedly fast water currents in this river.

In Missouri, it has also been reported in Center Creek and Indian Creek and despite a scarcity of recent collections, the Neosho mucket is believed to survive in these two waters.

Collections of relic shells from the Verdigris, Neosho, Spring and Big Caney Rivers in Oklahoma indicate that the mussel is now extirpated from these waters. Live specimens have been collected only from a 55-mile stretch of the Illinois River between Lake Tenkiller and Lake Francis in modern Oklahoma surveys. The main remaining populations are now isolated from each other via major impoundments and extensive reaches of degraded river, which may render these populations vulnerable to random catastrophic events due to being inbred.

=== Habitat ===
The typical habitat of this species has been described as relatively shallow, fast-flowing water with a fine to medium gravel substrate. However, its widespread habitat use appears to be variable; and live specimens have been collected from both sand-gravel bars and bedrock crevices. For example, habitat use by this mussel in the Spring River and Shoal Creek differs considerably from habitat use in other Kansas rivers.

In the Spring River where water currents are faster than in many other Kansas waters, the Neosho mucket occurs in high densities in the fast flow, and dominates over other freshwater mussel species; whereas in Shoal Creek and also the Oklahoma portion of the Illinois River, it has been often found in backwaters out of the strongest currents where it is less dominant than most heterospecifics. However, the gravel beds of Shoal Creek and the Spring River are less compacted than in other Kansas streams, so the availability of loose substratum to burrow in may therefore be important for this mussel even where water currents are slow such as in Shoal Creek. Overall, its optimal habitat conditions appear to comprise fast water currents and an abundance of loose gravel substrate; whereas low water currents with compact substratum are probably least optimal. The Neosho mucket also appears more adapted to unstable habitats than most other local unionids.

Additionally, the type of habitat which this mussel frequents seems to be related to its physical appearance. In the Illinois River in Oklahoma, specimens found in silty backwaters were observed to be large, darkly stained, and with algal growth on their shells. In contrast, individuals found in fast-flowing waters over rock or gravel were smaller, lighter in color and more likely to show the green rays often shown on the shell of this species.

=== Reproduction ===
Juvenile recruitment in this mussel species appears to be low, since relatively few juveniles have been collected during population surveys. However, this may be because juveniles in their first few years usually bury themselves completely below the surface of the river bed, making it difficult to detect them and in turn leading to underestimates of recruitment in populations.

As in other lampsilines, the female uses mantel lure flaps resembling prey fish to attract piscivorous fish that are hosts for glochidia. On contact with the flaps, the fish ruptures the mussel's marsupial gills, thereby releasing the glochidia into the surrounding water and serving as a landing site for the glochidia. Females have been observed in a head stand position while waving their mantel flaps, and this mantel lure display may take place from July through September when breeding is finished. The only known suitable fish hosts are smallmouth bass Micropterus dolomieu and largemouth bass M. salmoides; although spotted bass M. punctulatus has been proposed as another suitable host.

Unlike many other lampsilines, the Neosho mucket is a short-term breeder, spawning and brooding from May until August. Brooded larvae are released from the marsupial gills of the females within a few weeks of egg fertilization. This is in contrast to other lampsilines that begin egg production in fall, brood them over winter after fertilization, and release larvae the following spring or summer. Reduction in breeding duration in this mussel to last for only one season is probably adaptive, as it minimizes the potential risk of eggs and larvae on the gills being exposed during brooding to microbial predators and bacteria. Alternatively, the Neosho mucket may benefit from the greater availability of energy reserves in spring than in winter.

The Neosho mucket can live for over 30 years.

=== Other behavior ===
The Neosho mucket tends to use its foot as an anchor to secure itself in gravel substrates. This may give it an advantage in waters with high current velocities. In the Spring River, for example, it has been found to be a dominant species in fast-flowing reaches; while in other Kansas waters, it appears to be less dominant in slower and more stable habitats. Because of the foot-anchoring adaptation to unstable habitats typical of the Spring River Basin, and the colourful mantle lure that would be effective in attracting host fishes in the clear waters, the Neosho mucket is thought to have evolved in the Spring River or other Ozarkian streams; rather than in the western part of the range where the waters are generally slower and more turbid.

== Status and threats ==
The Neosho mucket is listed as endangered on the IUCN Red List because its range has decreased by 70% over the past 25–50 years; and the current population trend is decreasing. Its extant range is estimated to cover 70,000km2. Distribution of this species' relic shells throughout Kansas, Missouri, Oklahoma and Arkansas indicates that the Neosho mucket was once more widespread throughout these basins than presently.

It is threatened by anthropogenic habitat degradation through the construction of reservoirs and dams; siltation and pollution of its freshwater habitat through poor agricultural practices; lead, zinc and gravel mining; and deforestation. Its sensitivity to habitat pollution and siltation has been known at the earliest since the 1960s. Low juvenile recruitment may further exacerbate population declines.

Most of the range and population decline has occurred in Oklahoma and Kansas. The discovery of relic shells in Oklahoma rivers suggests that the species was once widespread in the state. Within Oklahoma, however, the Neosho mucket is now restricted to a 55-mile stretch of the Illinois River between Lake Tenkiller and Lake Francis. Nevertheless, it has been recognized as a dominant unionid species inhabiting this remaining section of the Illinois River in Oklahoma, and mussel species richness in general may be declining in this state. Meanwhile, in the Arkansas portion of the Illinois River, a 53% decline in the number of designated survey sites inhabited by the Neosho was recorded between 1998 and 2008. Further, the majority of subpopulations in Arkansas appears unstable and probably faces imminent extirpation.

This species has apparently never been found in large numbers and has been reported as rare and endangered since the early 1970s. The total population has been estimated at 100000 mature individuals. At a historical mussel shell excavation site near the Verdigris River, the Neosho Mucket was rarely encountered among all uncovered shells; and its rare occurrence closely matched its rarity in the modern Verdigris River. This suggests that populations in the Verdigris have long been sparse; and if the Neosho mucket is generally a naturally rare species despite evidence from relic shells of a previously larger overall geographic range, this may explain its apparent vulnerability to local extirpation.

Due to persistent population declines, isolation and fragmentation of this mussel, the U.S. Fish and Wildlife Service listed the Neosho mucket as a candidate species for addition to the Federal List of Endangered and Threatened Wildlife in 2000. However, further research into the population status and extent of potential threats for the Neosho mucket is needed to make conservation efforts to protect this species more effective.

Natural threats include predation of juveniles by turbellarian and nemertean flatworms (especially in captivity), and raccoons. In the latter case, raccoons apparently exploit low water levels in winter to access the muckets for food. Trematodes have sometimes been found to infest the gonads in adults, and such infestation has been significantly linked with mortality. Introduced species found in the Neosho mucket's range such as zebra mussels and Asian clams also threaten to outcompete this mussel for food and habitat space.

== In relation with humans ==
The Neosho mucket has been a popular choice of freshwater mussel for captive propagation in population restoration projects because of this mussel's large body size, relatively fast growth rate, large number of glochidia produced, and the fact that the suitable host fish largemouth bass is also commonly propagated in fish hatcheries. Captive rearing of this mussel has been conducted since the 1920s. Transformation success on largemouth bass has been reported to be as high as 71%.

Rearing of the Neosho mucket has been successfully implemented in fish hatcheries at Chesapeake, Missouri. Captive juveniles were also found to have survived 16 months after their release into native habitats in the Fall and Verdigris Rivers in Kansas. Further, these previously captive juveniles have been the first wild young specimens to have been recorded in Kansas; whereas previous surveys of the Fall, Verdigris and Neosho Rivers in Kansas have detected only mature individuals. Captive breeding of this mussel will be important in future to restore recently degraded wild populations in the face of the species' extensive population and range declines.

In response to the designation of the Neosho mucket as a federal candidate species by the USE Fish and Wildlife Service in 2001 due to declines throughout its range, the Neosho Mucket Recovery Working Group was formed to begin coordinating conservation efforts for the species.

Before the Neosho mucket was identified as a separate species, it was probably commercially popular especially as a source species for the manufacture of pearl buttons, which may have contributed to the population and range decline observed.
