= Uniomerus tetralasmus =

Conservation status
- Least Concern (IUCN 3.1)

- Secure (NatureServe)

Scientific classification
- Kingdom: Animalia
- Phylum: Mollusca
- Class: Bivalvia
- Order: Unionida
- Family: Unionidae
- Genus: Uniomerus
- Species: U. tetralasmus

Binomial name
- Uniomerus tetralasmus (Say, 1831)

Species of bivalve

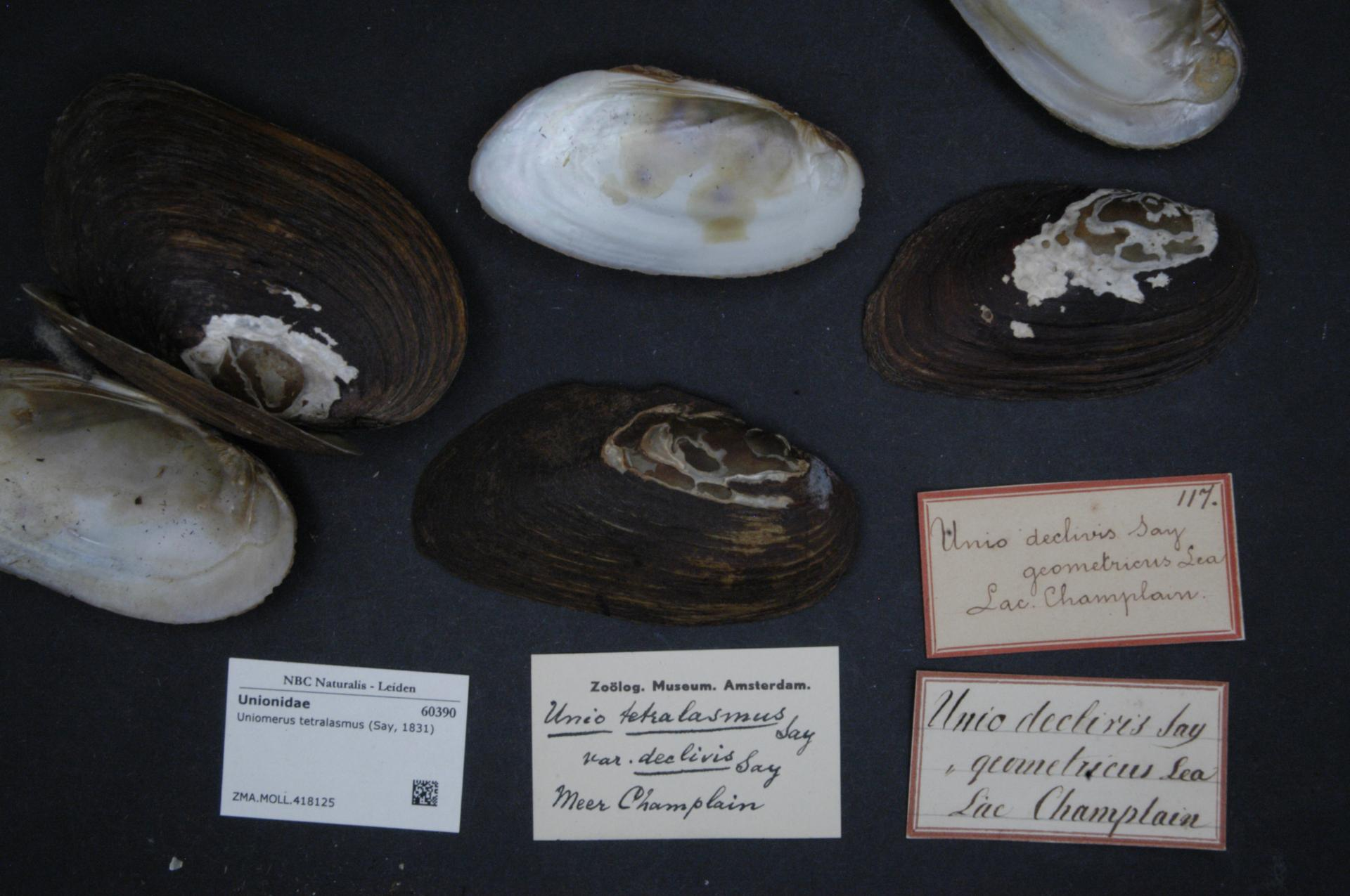

Uniomerus tetralasmus is a species of freshwater mussel, an aquatic bivalve mollusk in the family Unionidae, the river mussels.
