= List of near threatened invertebrates =

- Extinct in the wild (EW): 2 species
- Critically endangered (CR): 853 species
- Endangered (EN): 1,533 species
- Vulnerable (VU): 1,578 species
- Near threatened (NT, LR/cd): 1,119 species
- Least concern (LC): 8,632 species
- Data deficient (DD): 4,644 species
Invertebrate species (IUCN, 2025.2)
- 18,442 extant species have been evaluated
- 13,798 of those are fully assessed (Note: excludes data deficient evaluations.)
- 9,751 are not threatened at present
- 4,047 to 8,691 are threatened (Note: Threatened comprises CR, EN and VU. Upper estimate additionally includes DD.)
- 83 to 255 are extinct or extinct in the wild:
  - 81 extinct (EX) species (Note: Chart omits extinct (EX) species)
  - 2 extinct in the wild (EW)
  - 171 possibly extinct [CR(PE)]
  - 1 possibly extinct in the wild [CR(PEW)]

Near threatened (NT) species do not currently qualify for critically endangered (CR), endangered (EN) or vulnerable (VU) status, but are likely to qualify for a threatened category in the near future, or are already close to qualifying.

In July 2016, the International Union for Conservation of Nature (IUCN) listed 1105 near threatened invertebrate species. Of all evaluated invertebrate species, 6.1% are listed as near threatened. The IUCN also lists 15 invertebrate subspecies as near threatened.

No subpopulations of invertebrates have been evaluated by the IUCN.

This is a complete list of near threatened invertebrate species and subspecies as evaluated by the IUCN.

== Molluscs ==
There are 535 mollusc species and nine mollusc subspecies assessed as near threatened.

=== Gastropods ===
There are 477 gastropod species and four gastropod subspecies assessed as near threatened.

==== Stylommatophora ====
Stylommatophora includes the majority of land snails and slugs. There are 250 species and four subspecies in the order Stylommatophora assessed as near threatened.

===== Zonitids =====
- Paravitrea clappi
- Trochomorpha corallina
- Trochomorpha fessonia
- Trochomorpha luedersi
- Trochomorpha melvillensis
- Zonites anaphiensis

===== Clausiliids =====
Species

- Boettgeria crispa
- Charpentieria dyodon
- Muticaria macrostoma

Subspecies

- Alopia bielzii clathrata
- Macrogastra lineolata euzieriana

===== Helminthoglyptids =====
- Morongo desert snail (Eremarionta morongoana)
- Victorville shoulderband (Helminthoglypta mohaveana)
- Sonorella allynsmithi
- Sonorella christenseni
- San Xavier talus snail (Sonorella eremita)
- Sonorella grahamensis
- Sonorella macrophallus
- Franklin Mountain talus snail (Sonorella metcalfi)
- Sonorella todseni

===== Camaenids =====
Species

- Amphidromus cognatus
- Amplirhagada montalivetensis
- Barrington tops bristle snail (Austrochloritis ascensa)
- Baudinella baudinensis
- Macleay's single-banded snail (Bentosites macleayi)
- Cooperconcha centralis
- Cristilabrum spectaculum
- Cupedora broughami
- Cupedora luteofusca
- Cupedora marcidum
- Cupedora sutilosa
- Cupedora tomsetti
- Dirutrachia sublevata
- Mount lewis keeled snail (Forrestena delicata)
- Glyptorhagada janaslini
- Granulomelon arcigerens
- Granulomelon grandituberculatum
- Granulomelon squamulosum
- Atherton tableland keeled snail (Jacksonena rudis)
- Lacustrelix minor
- Lacustrelix yerelinana
- Mossman gorge treesnail (Meliobba shafferyi)
- Hacking river forest snail (Meridolum marshalli)
- Mesodontrachia fitzroyana
- Ordtrachia australis
- Ordtrachia septentrionalis
- Mottled treesnail (Papuexul bidwilli)
- Emerald green snail (Papustyla pulcherrima)
- Pleuroxia italowiana
- Border Ranges treesnail (Posorites turneri)
- Tinaroo red-striped snail (Protolinitis pusilla)
- Semotrachia winneckeana
- Rockhampton banded snail (Sphaerospira rockhamptonensis)
- Temporena whartoni
- Torresitrachia funium
- Trachiopsis victoriana
- Vincentrachia desmonda

Subspecies

- Glyptorhagada wilkawillina umbilicata

===== Vertiginids =====
- Montapiculus pyramidalis
- Truncatellina opisthodon
- Truncatellina velkovrhi
- Alabama vertigo (Vertigo alabamensis)
- Narrow-mouthed whorl snail (Vertigo angustior)
- Vertigo arctica
- Vertigo arthuri
- Vertigo hebardi
- Vertigo hubricti
- Vertigo lilljeborgi
- Vertigo occulta
- Vertigo ovata
- Vertigo ultimathule

===== Cochlicellids =====
- Monilearia montigena
- Monilearia multipunctata
- Monilearia phalerata
- Monilearia tubaeformis
- Ripkeniella petrophila

===== Trissexodontids =====
- Gasullia gasulli
- Gittenbergeria turriplana
- Hatumia zapateri
- Mastigophallus rangianus
- Oestophora ebria
- Oestophora ortizi
- Oestophora prietoi
- Suboestophora tarraconensis

===== Helicids =====
- Allognathus pyrenaicus
- Arianta hessei
- Arianta schmidtii
- Arianta stenzii
- Cattania ardica
- Cattania maranajensis
- Cattania petrovici
- Chilostoma achates
- Chilostoma acrotricha
- Chilostoma ambrosi
- Chilostoma crinita
- Chilostoma denudata
- Chilostoma euboeae
- Chilostoma fuchsi
- Chilostoma pentheri
- Chilostoma sztolcmani
- Chilostoma zebiana
- Chilostoma ziegleri
- Faustina rossmaessleri
- Hemicycla bethencourtiana
- Hemicycla diegoi
- Hemicycla glyceia
- Hemicycla incisogranulata
- Hemicycla laurijona
- Hemicycla quadricincta
- Hemicycla saponacea
- Iberus alonensis
- Iberus carthaginiensis
- Marmorana saxetana
- Marmorana signata
- Superba grisea
- Superba kulmakana
- Superba reischuetzi
- Theba clausoinflata

===== Hygromiids =====
Species

- Actinella anaglyptica
- Canariella discobolus
- Canariella squamata
- Canariella tillieri
- Candidula castriota
- Candidula cavannae
- Candidula ultima
- Cernuella hydrutina
- Cernuella lampedusae
- Discula attrita
- Discula cheiranthicola
- Disculella compar
- Helicella orzai
- Helicopsis conopsis
- Hystricella bicarinata
- Hystricella oxytropis
- Lemniscia michaudi
- Monacha consona
- Monacha gregaria
- Monacha orsinii
- Monacha oshanovae
- Monacha ovularis
- Monacha venusta
- Monachoides kosovoensis
- Montserratina bofilliana
- Petasina subtecta
- Plentuisa vendia
- Pyrenaearia carascalopsis
- Schileykiella parlatoris
- Schileykiella reinae
- Thyrreniellina josephi
- Trochoidea cumiae
- Trochoidea liebetruti
- Trochulus ataxiacus
- Trochulus caelatus
- Trochulus graminicola
- Trochulus oreinos
- Urticicola mounierensis
- Xerocrassa cisternasi
- Xerocrassa ebusitana
- Xerocrassa ferreri
- Xerocrassa jimenensis
- Xerocrassa molinae
- Xerocrassa nyeli
- Xerocrassa prietoi
- Xerocrassa turolensis
- Xerolenta depulsa
- Xerotricha huidobroi
- Xerotricha zaratei

Subspecies

- Xerocrassa montserratensis betulonensis

===== Vitrinids =====
- Oligolimax apatelus
- Phenacolimax major
- Plutonia canariensis
- Plutonia christinae
- Plutonia cuticula
- Plutonia emmersoni
- Plutonia mascaensis
- Plutonia parryi
- Plutonia tuberculata
- Vitrinobrachium baccettii

===== Chondrinids =====
- Abida gittenbergeri
- Abida vergniesiana
- Chondrina altimirai
- Chondrina arigonis
- Chondrina bergomensis
- Chondrina falkneri
- Chondrina granatensis
- Chondrina ripkeni
- Rupestrella rupestris
- Insular birddrop (Sterkia clementina)

===== Enids =====
- Chondrula lugorensis
- Euchondrus limbodentatus
- Mastus emarginatus
- Napaeus avaloensis
- Napaeus beguirae
- Napaeus consecoanus
- Napaeus huttereri
- Napaeus maculatus
- Napaeus orientalis
- Napaeus procerus
- Napaeus tafadaensis
- Napaeus voggenreiteri
- Peristoma merduenianum
- Peristoma rupestre
- Rhabdoena mirifica
- Rhabdoena stokesi
- Rhabdoena zasiensis
- Turanena carpathia
- Turanena katerinae

===== Argnids =====
- Agardhiella banatica
- Agardhiella crassilabris
- Agardhiella dabovici
- Agardhiella grossui
- Agardhiella langaleta
- Agardhiella pirotana
- Agardhiella reinhardti
- Agardhiella serbica

===== Other Stylommatophora species =====
- Allocharopa okeana
- Allocharopa tarravillensis
- Granulated Tasmanian snail (Anoglypta launcestonensis)
- Franklin Mountain woodland snail (Ashmunella pasonis)
- Atlantica scutula
- Beckianum sinistrum
- Sandbowl snail (Catinella arenaria)
- Craterodiscus pricei
- Deroceras vascoanum
- Drepanostoma nautiliforme
- Gonospira bourguignati
- Gyliotrachela catherina
- Helicodiscus diadema
- Helicodiscus hexodon
- Leiostyla calathiscus
- Leiostyla degenerata
- Leiostyla relevata
- Leptinaria strebeliana
- Malacolimax wiktori
- Orcula pseudodolium
- Orcula wagneri
- Orculella templorum
- Oxychilus basajauna
- Pachnodus silhouettanus
- Papilloderma altonagai
- Kauri snail (Paryphanta busbyi)
- Pillomena aemula
- Polygyra hippocrepis
- Strange many-whorled land snail (Polygyra peregrina)
- Powelliphanta marchantii
- Pupilla ficulnea
- Pupisoma sp. nov. 1
- Setomedea nudicostata
- Soosia diodonta
- Plaited snail (Spermodea lamellata)
- Succinea sanctaehelenae
- Keeled snail (Tasmaphena lamproides)
- Vallonia declivis
- Victaphanta atramentaria

==== Littorinimorpha ====
There are 115 species in the order Littorinimorpha assessed as near threatened.

===== Hydrobiids =====
- Alzoniella braccoensis
- Alzoniella hartwigschuetti
- Alzoniella macrostoma
- Alzoniella manganellii
- Alzoniella microstoma
- Alzoniella montana
- Alzoniella rolani
- Alzoniella sigestra
- Austropyrgus colensis
- Austropyrgus foris
- Austropyrgus grampianensis
- Austropyrgus nepeanensis
- Avenionia berenguieri
- Avenionia parvula
- Avenionia roberti
- Belgrandia boscae
- Belgrandia gibba
- Belgrandia heussi
- Belgrandiella dabriana
- Belgrandiella libanica
- Bythinella badensis
- Bythinella hansboetersi
- Bythiospeum alpinum
- Bythiospeum diaphanoides
- Bythiospeum diaphanum
- Bythiospeum puerkhaueri
- Bythiospeum transsylvanica
- Bythiospeum vallei
- Catapyrgus fraterculus
- Chilopyrgula sturanyi
- Chondrobasis levantina
- Dabriana bosniaca
- Fissuria boui
- Fissuria planospira
- Fissuria raehlei
- Fluviopupa gracilis
- Fluviopupa ramsayi
- Fonscochlea zeidleri
- Greenbrier cavesnail (Fontigens turritella)
- Graziana papukensis
- Hauffenia plana
- Hauffenia subcarinata
- Hemistomia gemma
- Hydrobia accrensis
- Hydrobia brondeli
- Hydrobia lactea
- Iglica giustii
- Iglica hauffeni
- Iglica luxurians
- Iglica pezzolii
- Iglica vobarnensis
- Islamia gaiteri
- Islamia globulus
- Istriana mirnae
- Lanzaia rudnicae
- Lobogenes pusilla
- Mercuria zopissa
- Milesiana schuelei
- Nanocochlea parva
- Narentiana albida
- Ochridopyrgula macedonica
- Ohridohoratia pygmaea
- Ohridohoratia sturanyi
- Pachydrobiella brevis
- Paladilhiopsis pretneri
- Paladilhiopsis serbica
- Paraprososthenia acicula
- Paraprososthenia bollingi
- Paraprososthenia brandti
- Paraprososthenia jullei
- Paraprososthenia taylori
- Phreatica bolei
- Potamopyrgus oscitans
- Potamopyrgus troglodytes
- Pseudamnicola falkneri
- Bear Lake springsnail (Pyrgulopsis pilsbryana)
- Huachuca springsnail (Pyrgulopsis thompsoni)
- Radomaniola caputlacus
- Sheitanok amidicus
- Savannah pebblesnail (Somatogyrus tenax)
- Sororipyrgus kutukutu
- Sororipyrgus raki
- Terranigra kosovica
- Victodrobia victoriensis

===== Bithyniids =====
- Bithynia candiota
- Gabbiella rosea
- Pseudobithynia pentheri
- Pseudobithynia westerlundii

===== Moitessieriids =====
- Moitessieria heideae
- Moitessieria olleri
- Paladilhia hungarica
- Sardopaladilhia plagigeyerica
- Spiralix vitrea

===== Assimineids =====
- Omphalotropis circumlineata
- Omphalotropis zelriolata

===== Pomatiopsids =====
- Halewisia conica
- Hubendickia gochenouri
- Hubendickia microsculpta
- Hubendickia polita
- Hubendickia rolfbrandti
- Hubendickia schlickumi
- Hubendickia schuetti
- Hubendickia subulata
- Hubendickia tuberculata
- Hubendickia turneri
- Karelainia hydrorissoidea
- Lacunopsis coronata
- Lacunopsis fischerpiettei
- Lacunopsis massiei
- Pachydrobia harmandi
- Pachydrobia incerta
- Robertsiella kaporensis
- Tomichia rogersi

===== Stenothyrids =====
- Stenothyra khongi
- Stenothyra wykoffi

==== Sorbeoconcha ====
- Bridouxia ponsonbyi
- Bridouxia praeclara
- Brotia mariae
- Cleopatra grandidieri
- Spider elimia (Elimia arachnoidea)
- Savannah elimia (Elimia caelatura)
- Slowwater elimia (Elimia interveniens)
- Carved elimia (Elimia plicatastriata)
- File elimia (Elimia striatula)
- Squat elimia (Elimia variata)
- Topaz juga (Juga acutifilosa)
- Lavigeria coronata
- Geniculate river snail (Lithasia geniculata)
- Melanatria fluminea
- Madagasikara madagascariensis (Melanatria madagascarensis)
- Melanoides admirabilis
- Melanoides nsendweensis
- Melanoides polymorpha
- Melanoides pupiformis
- Melanoides turritispira
- Melanopsis lorcana
- Bottle hornsnail (Pleurocera gradata)
- Skirted hornsnail (Pleurocera pyrenella)
- Potadoma liricincta
- Tanganyicia rufofilosa

==== Architaenioglossa ====
There are 41 species in the order Architaenioglossa assessed as near threatened.

===== Pupinids =====
- Pupina coxeni
- Pupina pfeifferi

===== Diplommatinids =====
- Cochlostoma asturicum
- Cochlostoma dalmatinum
- Cochlostoma euboicum
- Cochlostoma mostarensis
- Cochlostoma obscurum
- Cochlostoma pageti
- Cochlostoma parnonis
- Cochlostoma pinteri
- Cochlostoma stossichi
- Diplommatina lamellata
- Diplommatina lutea
- Moussonia fuscula
- Palaina dimorpha
- Palaina martensi
- Plectostoma christae

===== Aciculids =====
- Acicula beneckei
- Acicula disjuncta
- Acicula hausdorfi
- Acicula vezzanii
- Menkia horsti
- Platyla elisabethae
- Platyla minutissima
- Platyla orthostoma
- Platyla pezzolii
- Platyla sardoa
- Platyla subdiaphana
- Platyla talentii
- Renea kobelti
- Renea moutonii

===== Viviparids =====
- Bellamya costulata
- Bellamya jucunda
- Bellamya monardi
- Bellamya rubicunda

===== Ampullariids =====
- Afropomus balanoideus
- Lanistes elliptus
- Lanistes stuhlmanni
- Pomacea expansa

===== Craspedopomatids =====
- Craspedopoma hespericum
- Craspedopoma monizianum

==== Lower Heterobranchia species ====
- Valvata rhabdota
- Valvata stenotrema

==== Cycloneritimorpha ====
- Neritina natalensis
- Neritina rubricata
- Theodoxus anatolicus

==== Hygrophila species ====
- Biomphalaria smithi
- Bulinus cernicus
- Bulinus hightoni
- Bulinus octaploidus
- Burnupia crassistriata
- Burnupia stuhlmanni
- Ceratophallus crassus
- Gyraulus lychnidicus
- Lymnaea tumrokensis
- Mud snail (Omphiscola glabra)
- Stimulator consetti
- Stagnicola montenegrinus

==== Neogastropoda ====
There are 29 species in the order Neogastropoda assessed as near threatened.

===== Buccinids =====
- Ranella olearia
- Ranella parthenopaeum

===== Muricids =====
- Latiaxis babelis

===== Conids =====
- Conus atlanticoselvagem
- Golden cone (Conus aurantius)
- Conus boschorum
- Conus cardinalis
- Conus curassaviensis
- Conus curralensis
- Conus denizi
- Conus derrubado
- Conus diminutus
- Conus dorotheae
- Conus evorai
- Conus explorator
- Conus gauguini
- Conus josephinae
- Conus kersteni
- Kirk Ander's cone (Conus kirkandersi)
- Conus luquei
- Conus navarroi
- Conus nielsenae
- Conus nobrei
- Conus saragasae
- Conus taslei
- Conus terryni
- Conus trencarti
- Conus trochulus
- Conus zebroides

=== Bivalvia ===
There are 57 species and five subspecies in the class Bivalvia assessed as near threatened.

==== Unionida ====
There are 49 species and five subspecies in the order Unionoida assessed as near threatened.

===== Unionids =====
Species

- Actinonaias pectorosa
- Amphinaias asperata
- Amphinaias houstonensis
- Amphinaias refulgens
- Anodonta vescoiana
- Rayed creekshell (Anodontoides radiatus)
- Coelatura hypsiprymna
- Cyclonaias tuberculata
- Ellipsaria lineolata
- Elliptio ahenea
- Elliptio congaraea
- Elliptio dariensis
- Yellow lance (Elliptio lanceolata)
- Fluted elephantear (Elliptio mcmichaeli)
- Altamaha lance (Elliptio shepardiana)
- Fusconaia askewi
- Tapered pigtoe (Fusconaia burkei)
- Fusconaia infucata
- Southern sandshell (Hamiota australis)
- Lampsilis bracteata
- Lampsilis cardium
- Waccamaw fatmucket (Lampsilis fullerkati)
- Lampsilis ovata
- Orangenacre mucket (Lampsilis perovalis)
- Lampsilis satura
- Leguminaia wheatleyi
- Scale shell (Leptodea leptodon)
- Tidewater mucket (Leptodea ochracea)
- Ligumia nasuta
- Medionidus conradicus
- Obovaria subrotunda
- Obovaria unicolor
- Oxynaia jourdyi
- Ohio pigtoe (Pleurobema cordatum)
- Pleurobema riddellii
- Pyramid pigtoe (Pleurobema rubrum)
- Ptychobranchus occidentalis
- Ptychobranchus subtentum
- Ptychorhynchus pfisteri
- Inflated floater (Pyganodon gibbosa)
- Rabbitsfoot (Quadrula cylindrica)
- Salamander mussel (Simpsonaias ambigua)
- Alabama creekmussel (Strophitus connasaugaensis)
- Strophitus subvexus
- Unio delphinus
- Unio mancus
- Choctaw bean (Villosa choctawensis)

Subspecies

- Lampsilis reeviana brevicula
- Lampsilis straminea claibornensis
- Lampsilis straminea straminea
- Lasmigona complanata alabamensis
- Quadrula cylindrica cylindrica

===== Hyriids =====
- Southern river mussel (Hyridella narracanensis)
- South Esk freshwater mussel (Velesunio moretonicus)

==== Cardiida ====
- Bear paw clam (Hippopus hippopus)
- China clam (Hippopus porcellanus)
- Maxima clam (Tridacna maxima)
- Fluted giant clam (Tridacna squamosa)

==== Venerida ====
- Dreissena presbensis
- Pisidium montigenum
- Sphaerium austeni
- Sphaerium solidum

=== Cephalopods ===
- Giant Australian cuttlefish (Sepia apama)

== Cnidaria ==
There are 176 species in the phylum Cnidaria assessed as near threatened.

=== Hydrozoa ===
- Millepora murrayi

=== Anthozoa ===
There are 175 species in the class Anthozoa assessed as near threatened.

==== Alcyonacea ====
- Organ pipe coral (Tubipora musica)

==== Scleractinia ====
There are 174 species in the order Scleractinia assessed as near threatened.

===== Euphyllids =====
- Euphyllia divisa
- Euphyllia glabrescens
- Euphyllia yaeyamaensis
- Plerogyra simplex
- Plerogyra sinuosa

===== Acroporids =====
- Acropora appressa
- Acropora arabensis
- Acropora austera
- Acropora carduus
- Acropora digitifera
- Acropora divaricata
- Branch coral (Acropora florida)
- Acropora formosa
- Acropora glauca
- Acropora granulosa
- Acropora humilis
- Brush coral (Acropora hyacinthus)
- Acropora loripes
- Acropora lutkeni
- Acropora millepora
- Acropora monticulosa
- Acropora nana
- Acropora nasuta
- Acropora pichoni
- Acropora secale
- Acropora selago
- Acropora tenuis
- Astreopora expansa
- Astreopora macrostoma
- Catch bowl coral (Isopora palifera)
- Montipora confusa
- Montipora cryptus
- Montipora efflorescens
- Montipora effusa
- Montipora foliosa
- Montipora foveolata
- Montipora hirsuta
- Montipora incrassata
- Montipora niugini
- Montipora nodosa
- Montipora palawanensis
- Montipora peltiformis
- Montipora porites
- Montipora saudii
- Montipora undata
- Montipora venosa

===== Poritids =====
- Alveopora catalai
- Alveopora spongiosa
- Alveopora viridis
- Goniopora columna
- Goniopora lobata
- Goniopora minor
- Goniopora stokesi
- Goniopora tenella
- Porites annae
- Blue crust coral (Porites branneri)
- Porites cylindrica
- Porites deformis
- Porites densa
- Porites echinulata
- Porites harrisoni
- Porites lobata
- Porites murrayensis
- Porites negrosensis
- Porites somaliensis
- Porites stephensoni

===== Brain corals =====
- Caulastrea tumida
- Diploastrea heliopora
- Echinopora forskaliana
- Echinopora fruticulosa
- Echinopora horrida
- Echinopora mammiformis
- Echinopora pacificus
- Echinopora taylorae
- Erythrastrea flabellata
- Favia albidus
- Favia helianthoides
- Favia lacuna
- Favia laxa
- Favia lizardensis
- Favia maritima
- Favia marshae
- Favia matthaii
- Favia maxima
- Favia rotundata
- Favia stelligera
- Favia veroni
- Favia vietnamensis
- Favites abdita
- Favites acuticollis
- Favites bestae
- Favites chinensis
- Favites complanata
- Favites flexuosa
- Favites halicora
- Favites micropentagona
- Favites paraflexuosa
- Favites russelli
- Favites stylifera
- Favites vasta
- Goniastrea columella
- Goniastrea favulus
- Goniastrea minuta
- Goniastrea palauensis
- Goniastrea peresi
- Goniastrea thecata
- Leptastrea bewickensis
- Leptastrea bottae
- Leptastrea inaequalis
- Leptoria phrygia
- Montastrea annuligera
- Montastrea colemani
- Montastrea magnistellata
- Montastrea valenciennesi
- Oulophyllia bennettae
- Oulophyllia crispa
- Platygyra acuta
- Platygyra carnosus
- Platygyra crosslandi
- Platygyra lamellina
- Platygyra ryukyuensis
- Platygyra verweyi
- Plesiastrea devantieri

===== Pocilloporids =====
- Antler coral (Pocillopora grandis)
- Birdsnest coral (Seriatopora caliendrum)
- Seriatopora stellata
- Smooth cauliflower coral (Stylophora pistillata)
- Stylophora wellsi

===== Mussids =====
- Acanthastrea hillae
- Acanthastrea lordhowensis
- Acanthastrea maxima
- Acanthastrea subechinata
- Australomussa rowleyensis
- Blastomussa wellsi
- Cynarina lacrymalis
- Lobophyllia pachysepta
- Micromussa amakusensis
- Micromussa minuta
- Scolymia vitiensis

===== Pectiniids =====
- Echinomorpha nishihirai
- Pectinia ayleni
- Pectinia elongata
- Pectinia paeonia
- Pectinia pygmaeus
- Pectinia teres

===== Siderastreids =====
- Coscinaraea crassa
- Psammocora contigua
- Psammocora digitata
- Psammocora obtusangula
- Psammocora vaughani
- Pseudosiderastrea tayami

===== Agariciids =====
- Thin leaf lettuce coral (Agaricia tenuifolia)
- Leptoseris amitoriensis
- Leptoseris striata
- Pachyseris gemmae
- Pavona minuta

===== Fungiids =====
- Ctenactis albitentaculata
- Common mushroom coral (Fungia fungites)
- Lithophyllon undulatum
- Podabacia motuporensis
- Polyphyllia novaehiberniae

===== Other Scleractinia species =====
- Duncanopsammia axifuga
- Galaxea fascicularis
- Galaxea longisepta
- Galaxea paucisepta
- Heteropsammia eupsammides
- Hydnophora exesa
- Hydnophora microconos
- Palauastrea ramosa
- Paraclavarina triangularis
- Open brain coral (Trachyphyllia geoffroyi)
- Turbinaria radicalis

== Arthropods ==
There are 390 arthropod species and six arthropod subspecies assessed as near threatened.

=== Arachnids ===
- Mexican redknee tarantula (Brachypelma smithi)
- Brignolia bowleri
- Clubiona hitchinsi
- Microbianor nigritarsus
- Spinembolia clabnum
- Karwar large burrowing spider (Thrigmopoeus truculentus)

=== Branchiopoda ===
- Mono Lake brine shrimp (Artemia monica)
- California linderiella (Linderiella occidentalis)

=== Entognatha ===
- Blasconura batai
- Lepidonella lecongkieti

=== Maxillopoda ===
Includes barnacles, copepods and a number of related animals.

- Attheyella yemanjae
- Canthocamptus campaneri
- Metacyclops campestris
- Murunducaris juneae
- Muscocyclops bidentatus
- Muscocyclops therasiae
- Ponticyclops boscoi
- Thermocyclops parvus

=== Malacostracans ===
Malacostraca includes crabs, lobsters, crayfish, shrimp, krill, woodlice, and many others. There are 71 malacostracan species and six malacostracan subspecies assessed as near threatened.

==== Decapods ====
There are 71 decapod species and six decapod subspecies assessed as near threatened.

===== Parastacids =====
- Lilly pilly burrowing crayfish (Engaeus australis)
- Mount Arthur burrowing crayfish (Engaeus orramakunna)
- Engaeus victoriensis
- Euastacus wiowuru
- Western swamp crayfish (Gramastacus insolitus)
- Ombrastacoides asperrimanus
- Ombrastacoides dissitus
- Parastacus brasiliensis

===== Gecarcinucids =====
- Austrothelphusa wasselli
- Ceylonthelphusa kandambyi
- Ceylonthelphusa venusta
- Liotelphusa gagei
- Liotelphusa laevis
- Maydelliathelphusa edentula
- Parathelphusa sarasinorum

===== Atyids =====
Species

- Atyoida bisulcata
- Caridina fasciata
- Caridina formosae
- Caridina mauritii
- Caridina meridonalis
- Caridina richtersi
- Caridina serrata
- Caridina spathulirostris
- Dugastella valentina
- Gallocaris inermis
- Lancaris singhalensis
- Pycneus morsitans
- Troglocaris hercegovinensis
- Troglocaris planinensis
- Troglocaris pretneri

Subspecies

- Troglocaris anophthalmus anophthalmus
- Troglocaris anophthalmus intermedia
- Troglocaris anophthalmus legovici
- Troglocaris anophthalmus ocellata
- Troglocaris anophthalmus periadriatica
- Troglocaris anophthalmus sontica

===== Cambarids =====
- Cambarellus chapalanus
- Big South Fork crayfish (Cambarus bouchardi)
- Coosawattee crayfish (Cambarus coosawattae)
- Broad river stream crayfish (Cambarus lenati)
- Greenbrier cave crayfish (Cambarus nerterius)
- Βristly cave crayfish (Cambarus setosus)
- Beautiful crayfish (Cambarus speciosus)
- Oconee burrowing crayfish (Cambarus truncatus)
- Tuckasegee stream crayfish (Cambarus tuckasegee)
- Brawleys fork crayfish (Cambarus williami)
- Speckled burrowing crayfish (Fallicambarus danielae)
- Jefferson County crayfish (Fallicambarus gilpini)
- Camp Shelby burrowing crayfish (Fallicambarus gordoni)
- Ouachita burrowing crayfish (Fallicambarus harpi)
- Flatwoods digger (Fallicambarus oryktes)
- Ouachita fencing crayfish (Faxonella creaseri)
- Blood river crayfish (Orconectes burri)
- Mammoth spring crayfish (Orconectes marchandi)
- Livingston crayfish (Orconectes margorectus)
- Procambarus cuetzalanae
- Lagniappe crayfish (Procambarus lagniappe)
- Pallid cave crayfish (Procambarus pallidus)
- Black creek crayfish (Procambarus pictus)
- Procambarus vazquezae
- Procambarus zapoapensis
- Spider cave crayfish (Troglocambarus maclanei)

===== Potamids =====
- Miyazaki's crab (Geothelphusa miyazakii)
- Geothelphusa tenuimanus
- Johora tiomanensis
- Pilosamon guinotae
- Potamon fluviatile
- Potamon ibericum
- Potamon potamios
- Potamon rhodium
- Potamon setiger

===== Other decapod species =====
- Deckenia imitatrix
- Deckenia mitis
- Macrobrachium occidentale
- Neostrengeria perijaensis
- Cape Verde spiny lobster (Palinurus charlestoni)
- Troglocubanus eigenmanni

=== Insects ===
There are 301 insect species assessed as near threatened.

==== Hemiptera ====
- Cassini periodical cicada (Magicicada cassini)
- Decim periodical cicada (Magicicada septendecim)
- Decula periodical cicada (Magicicada septendecula)

==== Orthoptera ====
- Southern Sardinian cricket (Acroneuroptila puddui)
- Northern Sardinian cricket (Acroneuroptila sardoa)
- Gomera stick grasshopper (Acrostira bellamyi)
- Gran Canaria stick grasshopper (Acrostira tamarani)
- Tenerife short-winged bush-cricket (Ariagona margaritae)
- Splendid rock grasshopper (Arminda canariensis)
- Tenerife laurel bush-cricket (Canariola willemsei)
- Plump-headed grasshopper (Chorthippus crassiceps)
- Parnon grasshopper (Chorthippus parnon)
- Nymph-like grasshopper (Chorthippus pulloides)
- Giglio cave cricket (Dolichopoda aegilion)
- Larissa cave-cricket (Dolichopoda annae)
- Koutouki cave-cricket (Dolichopoda insignis)
- Kiriaki cave-cricket (Dolichopoda kiriakii)
- Cretan cave-cricket (Dolichopoda paraskevi)
- Corfu cave-cricket (Dolichopoda steriotisi)
- Ionian marbled bush-cricket (Eupholidoptera cephalonica)
- Uvarov's marbled bush-cricket (Eupholidoptera uvarovi)
- Cyprian tonged bush-cricket (Exodrymadusa inornata)
- Heldreich's stone grasshopper (Glyphotmethis heldreichi)
- Canarian crevice-cricket (Gryllomorpha canariensis)
- White-horned Italian grasshopper (Italohippus albicornis)
- Calabrian speckled bush-cricket (Leptophyes calabra)
- Greek speckled bush-cricket (Leptophyes lisae)
- California ground cricket (Neonemobius eurynotus)
- Parnassos glandular cricket (Ovaliptila krueperi)
- Sporades glandular cricket (Ovaliptila wettsteini)
- Jablanica bright bush-cricket (Poecilimon jablanicensis)
- Andros bright bush-cricket (Poecilimon klausgerhardi)
- Maquis bush-cricket (Rhacocleis silvestrii)
- Werner's bush-cricket (Rhacocleis werneri)
- Spanistic desert grasshopper (Spaniacris deserticola)
- Black-headed Jerusalem cricket (Stenopelmatus nigrocapitatus)
- Zoia's cave-cricket (Troglophilus zoiai)
- Aegean desert grasshopper (Xerohippus solerii)

==== Hymenoptera ====
- Bombus digressus
- Bombus diligens
- Bombus mendax
- Bombus mucidus
- Colletes creticus
- Colletes cyprius
- Colletes halophilus
- Epeolus cruciger
- Eucera gracilipes
- Formica aquilonia
- Formica lugubris
- Formica polyctena
- Formica pratensis
- Red wood ant (Formica rufa)
- Formica uralensis
- Hylaeus crassanus
- Hylaeus friesei
- Lasioglossum minutulum
- Lasioglossum sabulosum
- Lasioglossum setulosum
- Nomada argentata
- Nomada armata
- Nomada baccata
- Nomada cretensis
- Nomada errans
- Antennal-waving wasp (Tachysphex pechumani)

==== Lepidoptera ====
Lepidoptera comprises moths and butterflies. There are 62 species in the order Lepidoptera assessed as near threatened.

===== Swallowtail butterflies =====
- False Apollo (Archon apollinus)
- Short-horned baronia (Baronia brevicornis)
- Graphium mendana
- Japanese luehdorfia (Luehdorfia japonica)
- Chimaera birdwing (Ornithoptera chimaera)
- Papilio benguetanus
- Papilio grosesmithi
- Papilio himeros
- Papilio manlius
- Papilio maraho
- Kilimanjaro swallowtail (Papilio sjoestedti)
- Parides burchellanus
- Kaiserihind (Teinopalpus imperialis)
- Borneo birdwing (Troides andromache)

===== Lycaenids =====
- Lequeux's buff (Baliochila lequeuxi)
- Drakensberg copper (Chrysoritis oreas)
- Iolaus aphnaeoides
- Wineland blue (Lepidochrysops bacchus)
- Large copper (Lycaena dispar)
- Large blue (Phengaris arion)
- Greater large blue (Phengaris arionides)
- Dusky large blue (Phengaris nausithous)
- Scarce large blue (Phengaris teleius)
- Alpine zephyr blue (Plebejus trappi)
- Poecilmitis aureus
- Atlas blue (Polyommatus atlanticus)
- Beautiful blue (Polyommatus guezelmavi)
- Higgins's anomalous blue (Polyommatus nephohiptamenos)
- Mother-of-pearl blue (Polyommatus nivescens)
- Panoptes blue (Pseudophilotes panoptes)
- Thestor brachycerus
- Odd-spot blue (Turanana taygetica)

===== Nymphalids =====
- Lesser false fritillary (Anetia briarea)
- Salvin's anetia (Anetia cubana)
- Jaeger's anetia (Anetia jaegeri)
- False fritillary (Anetia pantheratus)
- False ringlet (Coenonympha oedippus)
- Vaucher's heath (Coenonympha vaucheri)
- Jamaican monarch (Danaus cleophile)
- White speck ringlet (Erebia claudina)
- Erebia epistgyne (Erebia epistygne)
- Yellow-banded ringlet (Erebia flavofasciata)
- Schaus's crow (Euploea blossomae)
- Javan crow (Euploea gamelia)
- Sumatran crow (Euploea martinii)
- Swainson's crow (Euploea swainson)
- Tobler's crow (Euploea tobleri)
- Woodland grayling (Hipparchia fagi)
- Eolian grayling (Hipparchia leighebi)
- Ceylon tree nymph (Idea iasonia)
- Malabar tree-nymph (Idea malabarica)
- Chios meadow brown (Maniola chia)
- Principe sailer (Neptis larseni)
- Zinken's tiger (Parantica albata)
- Nilgiri tiger (Parantica nilgiriensis)
- Javan tiger (Parantica pseudomelaneus)
- Ceylon tiger (Parantica taprobana)
- Sumatran chocolate tiger (Parantica tityoides)
- Magpie (Protoploea apatela)

===== Other Lepidoptera species =====
- Mountain clouded yellow (Colias phicomone)
- Small chimney-sweep grass moth (Helenoscoparia nigritalis)
- Wandering Skipper (Panoquina errans)

==== Beetles ====
There are 56 beetle species assessed as near threatened.

===== Geotrupids =====
- Ceratophyus hoffmannseggi
- Lethrus fallax
- Thorectes albarracinus
- Thorectes lusitanicus
- Thorectes marginatus

===== Click beetles =====
- Cardinal click beetle (Ampedus cardinalis)
- Ampedus carinthiacus
- Ampedus coenobita
- Ampedus corsicus
- Brachygonus meraculus
- Crepidophorus mutilatus
- Reitterelater bouyoni

===== Scarabaeids =====
- Alocoderus carinifrons
- Ammoecius lusitanicus
- Anomius crovettii
- Anomius peyerimhoffi
- Anonychonitis freyi
- Ateuchetus cicatricosus
- Cryptocanthon foveatus
- Cryptocanthon genieri
- Euorodalus boiteli
- Genieridium medinae
- Gymnopleurus sturmi
- Gyronotus dispar
- Gyronotus mulanjensis
- Heptaulacus brancoi
- Holocephalus sculptus
- Macroderes endroedyi
- Macroderes undulatus
- Mimonthophagus limbibasis
- Ontherus grandis
- Ontherus irinus
- Onthophagus merdarius
- Oxysternon pteroderum
- Pedaria cambeforti
- Phanaeus achilles
- Scarabaeus bornemizzai
- Scybalocanthon darlingtoni

===== Other beetle species =====
- Agathidium pulchellum
- Blabinotus spinicollis
- Blue ground beetle (Carabus intricatus)
- Ceruchus chrysomelinus
- Colophon izardi
- Cucujus cinnaberinus
- Daisy-plant fungus weevil (Homoeodera compositarum)
- Hylis simonae
- Microrhagus pyrenaeus
- Osmoderma barnabita
- Hermit beetle (Osmoderma eremita)
- Pseudotriphyllus suturalis
- Purpuricenus nicocles
- Ropalopus insubricus
- Stephanopachys brunneus
- Trichius orientalis
- Xyletinus tremulicola
- Xylophilus testaceus

==== Odonata ====
Odonata includes dragonflies and damselflies. There are 119 species in the order Odonata assessed as near threatened.

===== Chlorocyphids =====
- Chlorocypha bamptoni
- Angola jewel (Chlorocypha crocea)
- Indocypha vittata
- Libellago stictica
- Tanganyika jewel (Platycypha pinheyi)
- Rhinocypha xanthe
- Yellow-sided jewel (Stenocypha jacksoni)
- Bow-faced jewel (Stenocypha molindica)

===== Platycnemidids =====
- Allocnemis abbotti
- Katanga yellowwing (Allocnemis mitwabae)
- Elattoneura atkinsoni
- Idiocnemis adelbertensis
- Melanoneura bilineata
- Gambia riverjack (Mesocnemis dupuyi)
- Nososticta irene
- Phylloneura westermanni
- Platycnemis agrioides
- Risiocnemis serrata

===== Gomphids =====
- Acrogomphus malayanus
- Anormogomphus kiritshenkoi
- Asiagomphus amamiensis
- Asiagomphus personatus
- Diminutive clubtail (Gomphus diminutus)
- Twin-striped clubtail (Gomphus geminatus)
- Pronged clubtail (Gomphus graslinii)
- Hodges' clubtail (Gomphus hodgesi)
- Heliogomphus kelantanensis
- Heliogomphus promelas
- Wall's grappletail (Heliogomphus walli)
- Ictinogomphus acutus
- Megalogomphus hannyngtoni
- Merogomphus martini
- Neurogomphus pallidus
- Faded pincertail (Onychogomphus costae)
- Onychogomphus treadawayi
- Acuminate snaketail (Ophiogomphus acuminatus)
- Appalachian snaketail (Ophiogomphus incurvatus)
- Cataract hooktail (Paragomphus cataractae)
- Brook hooktail (Paragomphus henryi)
- Sinai hooktail (Paragomphus sinaiticus)
- Belle's sanddragon (Progomphus bellei)
- Progomphus kimminsi
- Stylurus nagoyanus
- Stylurus oculatus

===== Cordulegastrids =====
- Sombre goldenring (Cordulegaster bidentata)
- Balkan goldenring (Cordulegaster heros)
- Atlas goldenring (Cordulegaster princeps)
- Italian goldenring (Cordulegaster trinacriae)
- Neallogaster ornata

===== Corduliids =====
- Pilbara emerald (Hemicordulia koomina)
- Hemicordulia mindana
- Procordulia karnyi
- Calvert's emerald (Somatochlora calverti)
- Hine's emerald dragonfly (Somatochlora hineana)
- Ozark emerald (Somatochlora ozarkensis)

===== Calopterygids =====
- Atrocalopteryx atrocyana
- Calopteryx coomani
- Sapho infumosa
- Vestalis anacolosa
- Vestalis luctuosa

===== Coenagrionids =====
- Papyrus wisp (Agriocnemis palaeforma)
- Andinagrion garrisoni
- Archibasis rebeccae
- Argia rosseri
- Forest azuret (Azuragrion buchholzi)
- Socotra bluet (Azuragrion granti)
- Southern damselfly (Coenagrion mercuriale)
- Syrian bluet (Coenagrion syriacum)
- Scarlet bluet (Enallagma pictum)
- Pine barrens bluet (Enallagma recurvatum)
- Ischnura aralensis
- Dumont's bluetail (Ischnura intermedia)
- Nigrohamatum damselfly (Megalagrion nigrohamatum)
- Kauai bog damselfly (Megalagrion paludicola)
- Mortonagrion arthuri
- Four-spot midget (Mortonagrion hirosei)
- Everglades sprite (Nehalennia pallidula)
- Pygmy damselfly (Nehalennia speciosa)
- Protallagma hoffmanni
- Protoneura macintyrei
- Katanga sprite (Pseudagrion symoensii)

===== Aeshnids =====
- Allopetalia reticulosa
- Swamp emperor (Anax bangweuluensis)
- Terrestrial evening darner (Antipodophlebia asthenes)
- Green-striped darner (Dromaeschna forcipata)
- Oligoaeschna platyura
- Oligoaeschna poeciloptera
- Planaeschna intersedens

===== Libellulids =====
- Forestwatcher (Huonia melvillens)
- Libellula mariae
- Red chaser (Libellula pontica)
- Nyungwe junglewatcher (Neodythemis nyungwe)
- Trithemis aequalis
- Trithemis brydeni

===== Other Odonata species =====
- Tiny flatwing (Argiolestes pusillissimus)
- Alpine redspot (Austropetalia victoria)
- Chlorogomphus auratus
- Drepanosticta brownelli
- Drepanosticta fontinalis
- Drepanosticta krios
- Queen malachite (Ecchlorolestes nylephtha)
- Relict Himalayan dragonfly (Epiophlebia laidlawi)
- Pilbara pin (Eurysticta coolawanyah)
- Coomalie pin (Eurysticta coomalie)
- Ivory-faced flatwing (Heteragrion eboratum)
- Idionyx optata
- Indolestes bellax
- Indolestes indicus
- Macromia callisto
- Mountain river cruiser (Macromia margarita)
- Orange-spotted emerald (Oxygastra curtisii)
- Coastal petaltail (Petalura litorea)
- Philogenia helena
- Phyllomacromia funicularioides
- Rhinagrion elopurae
- Horned bannerwing (Stenocora percornuta)
- Tasmanian spotwing (Synthemiopsis gomphomacromioides)
- Teinopodagrion vallenatum

== Other invertebrate species ==
- European edible sea urchin (Echinus esculentus)
- European medicinal leech (Hirudo medicinalis)
- Louisiana mud worm (Lutodrilus multivesiculatus)
- Plicatoperipatus jamaicensis
- Lake Pedder planarian (Romankenkius pedderensis)

== See also ==
- Lists of IUCN Red List near threatened species
- List of least concern invertebrates
- List of vulnerable invertebrates
- List of endangered invertebrates
- List of critically endangered invertebrates
- List of recently extinct invertebrates
- List of data deficient invertebrates
