= List of near threatened molluscs =

- Extinct in the wild (EW): 12 species
- Critically endangered (CR): 785 species
- Endangered (EN): 708 species
- Vulnerable (VU): 1,123 species
- Near threatened (NT, LR/cd): 823 species
- Least concern (LC): 3,526 species
- Data deficient (DD): 2,229 species
Mollusc species (IUCN, 2025.2)
- 9,502 extant species have been evaluated
- 7,273 of those are fully assessed (Note: excludes data deficient evaluations.)
- 4,358 are not threatened at present
- 2,915 to 5,144 are threatened (Note: Threatened comprises CR, EN and VU. Upper estimate additionally includes DD.)
- 308 to 476 are extinct or extinct in the wild:
  - 296 extinct (EX) species (Note: Chart omits extinct (EX) species)
  - 12 extinct in the wild (EW)
  - 167 possibly extinct [CR(PE)]
  - 1 possibly extinct in the wild [CR(PEW)]

Near threatened (NT) species do not currently qualify for critically endangered (CR), endangered (EN) or vulnerable (VU) status, but are likely to qualify for a threatened category in the near future, or are already close to qualifying.

In September 2016, the International Union for Conservation of Nature (IUCN) listed 535 near threatened mollusc species. Of all evaluated mollusc species, 7.4% are listed as near threatened. The IUCN also lists nine mollusc subspecies as near threatened.

No subpopulations of molluscs have been evaluated by the IUCN.

This is a complete list of near threatened mollusc species and subspecies evaluated by the IUCN.

== Gastropods ==
There are 477 species and four subspecies of gastropod assessed as near threatened.

=== Stylommatophora ===
Stylommatophora includes the majority of land snails and slugs. There are 252 species and four subspecies in the order Stylommatophora assessed as near threatened.

==== Zonitids ====
- Paravitrea clappi
- Trochomorpha corallina
- Trochomorpha fessonia
- Trochomorpha luedersi
- Trochomorpha melvillensis
- Zonites anaphiensis

==== Clausiliids ====
Species

- Boettgeria crispa
- Charpentieria dyodon
- Muticaria macrostoma

Subspecies

- Alopia bielzii clathrata
- Macrogastra lineolata euzieriana

==== Helminthoglyptids ====
- Morongo desert snail (Eremarionta morongoana)
- Victorville shoulderband (Helminthoglypta mohaveana)
- Sonorella allynsmithi
- Sonorella christenseni
- San Xavier talus snail (Sonorella eremita)
- Sonorella grahamensis
- Sonorella macrophallus
- Franklin Mountain talus snail (Sonorella metcalfi)
- Sonorella todseni

==== Camaenids ====
Species

- Amphidromus cognatus
- Amplirhagada montalivetensis
- Barrington tops bristle snail (Austrochloritis ascensa)
- Baudinella baudinensis
- Macleay's single-banded snail (Bentosites macleayi)
- Cooperconcha centralis
- Cristilabrum spectaculum
- Cupedora broughami
- Cupedora luteofusca
- Cupedora marcidum
- Cupedora sutilosa
- Cupedora tomsetti
- Dirutrachia sublevata
- Mount lewis keeled snail (Forrestena delicata)
- Glyptorhagada janaslini
- Granulomelon arcigerens
- Granulomelon grandituberculatum
- Granulomelon squamulosum
- Atherton tableland keeled snail (Jacksonena rudis)
- Lacustrelix minor
- Lacustrelix yerelinana
- Mossman gorge treesnail (Meliobba shafferyi)
- Hacking river forest snail (Meridolum marshalli)
- Mesodontrachia fitzroyana
- Ordtrachia australis
- Ordtrachia septentrionalis
- Mottled treesnail (Papuexul bidwilli)
- Emerald green snail (Papustyla pulcherrima)
- Pleuroxia italowiana
- Border Ranges treesnail (Posorites turneri)
- Tinaroo red-striped snail (Protolinitis pusilla)
- Semotrachia winneckeana
- Rockhampton banded snail (Sphaerospira rockhamptonensis)
- Temporena whartoni
- Torresitrachia funium
- Trachiopsis victoriana
- Vincentrachia desmonda

Subspecies

- Glyptorhagada wilkawillina umbilicata

==== Vertiginids ====
- Montapiculus pyramidalis
- Truncatellina opisthodon
- Truncatellina velkovrhi
- Alabama vertigo (Vertigo alabamensis)
- Narrow-mouthed whorl snail (Vertigo angustior)
- Vertigo arctica
- Vertigo arthuri
- Vertigo hebardi
- Vertigo hubricti
- Vertigo lilljeborgi
- Vertigo occulta
- Vertigo ovata
- Vertigo ultimathule

==== Cochlicellids ====
- Monilearia montigena
- Monilearia multipunctata
- Monilearia phalerata
- Monilearia tubaeformis
- Ripkeniella petrophila

==== Trissexodontids ====
- Gasullia gasulli
- Gittenbergeria turriplana
- Hatumia zapateri
- Mastigophallus rangianus
- Oestophora ebria
- Oestophora ortizi
- Oestophora prietoi
- Suboestophora tarraconensis

==== Helicids ====
- Allognathus pyrenaicus
- Arianta hessei
- Arianta schmidtii
- Arianta stenzii
- Cattania ardica
- Cattania maranajensis
- Cattania petrovici
- Chilostoma achates
- Chilostoma acrotricha
- Chilostoma ambrosi
- Chilostoma crinita
- Chilostoma denudata
- Chilostoma euboeae
- Chilostoma fuchsi
- Chilostoma pentheri
- Chilostoma sztolcmani
- Chilostoma zebiana
- Chilostoma ziegleri
- Faustina rossmaessleri
- Hemicycla bethencourtiana
- Hemicycla diegoi
- Hemicycla glyceia
- Hemicycla incisogranulata
- Hemicycla laurijona
- Hemicycla quadricincta
- Hemicycla saponacea
- Iberus alonensis
- Iberus carthaginiensis
- Marmorana saxetana
- Marmorana signata
- Superba grisea
- Superba kulmakana
- Superba reischuetzi
- Theba clausoinflata

==== Hygromiids ====
Species

- Actinella anaglyptica
- Canariella discobolus
- Canariella squamata
- Canariella tillieri
- Candidula castriota
- Candidula cavannae
- Candidula ultima
- Cernuella hydrutina
- Cernuella lampedusae
- Discula attrita
- Discula cheiranthicola
- Disculella compar
- Helicella orzai
- Helicopsis conopsis
- Hystricella bicarinata
- Hystricella oxytropis
- Lemniscia michaudi
- Monacha consona
- Monacha gregaria
- Monacha orsinii
- Monacha oshanovae
- Monacha ovularis
- Monacha venusta
- Monachoides kosovoensis
- Montserratina bofilliana
- Petasina subtecta
- Plentuisa vendia
- Pyrenaearia carascalopsis
- Schileykiella parlatoris
- Schileykiella reinae
- Thyrreniellina josephi
- Trochoidea cumiae
- Trochoidea liebetruti
- Trochulus ataxiacus
- Trochulus caelatus
- Trochulus graminicola
- Trochulus oreinos
- Urticicola mounierensis
- Xerocrassa cisternasi
- Xerocrassa ebusitana
- Xerocrassa ferreri
- Xerocrassa jimenensis
- Xerocrassa molinae
- Xerocrassa nyeli
- Xerocrassa prietoi
- Xerocrassa turolensis
- Xerolenta depulsa
- Xerotricha huidobroi
- Xerotricha zaratei

Subspecies

- Xerocrassa montserratensis betulonensis

==== Vitrinids ====
- Oligolimax apatelus
- Phenacolimax major
- Plutonia canariensis
- Plutonia christinae
- Plutonia cuticula
- Plutonia emmersoni
- Plutonia mascaensis
- Plutonia parryi
- Plutonia tuberculata
- Vitrinobrachium baccettii

==== Chondrinids ====
- Abida gittenbergeri
- Abida vergniesiana
- Chondrina altimirai
- Chondrina arigonis
- Chondrina bergomensis
- Chondrina falkneri
- Chondrina granatensis
- Chondrina ripkeni
- Rupestrella rupestris
- Insular birddrop (Sterkia clementina)

==== Enids ====
- Chondrula lugorensis
- Euchondrus limbodentatus
- Mastus emarginatus
- Napaeus avaloensis
- Napaeus beguirae
- Napaeus consecoanus
- Napaeus huttereri
- Napaeus maculatus
- Napaeus orientalis
- Napaeus procerus
- Napaeus tafadaensis
- Napaeus voggenreiteri
- Peristoma merduenianum
- Peristoma rupestre
- Rhabdoena mirifica
- Rhabdoena stokesi
- Rhabdoena zasiensis
- Turanena carpathia
- Turanena katerinae

==== Argnids ====
- Agardhiella banatica
- Agardhiella crassilabris
- Agardhiella dabovici
- Agardhiella grossui
- Agardhiella langaleta
- Agardhiella pirotana
- Agardhiella reinhardti
- Agardhiella serbica

==== Other Stylommatophora species ====
- Allocharopa okeana
- Allocharopa tarravillensis
- Granulated Tasmanian snail (Anoglypta launcestonensis)
- Franklin Mountain woodland snail (Ashmunella pasonis)
- Atlantica scutula
- Beckianum sinistrum
- Sandbowl snail (Catinella arenaria)
- Craterodiscus pricei
- Deroceras vascoanum
- Drepanostoma nautiliforme
- Gonospira bourguignati
- Gyliotrachela catherina
- Helicodiscus diadema
- Helicodiscus hexodon
- Klemmia magnicosta
- Klemmia sinistrorsa
- Leiostyla calathiscus
- Leiostyla degenerata
- Leiostyla relevata
- Leptinaria strebeliana
- Malacolimax wiktori
- Orcula pseudodolium
- Orcula wagneri
- Orculella templorum
- Oxychilus basajauna
- Pachnodus silhouettanus
- Papilloderma altonagai
- Kauri snail (Paryphanta busbyi)
- Pillomena aemula
- Polygyra hippocrepis
- Strange many-whorled land snail (Polygyra peregrina)
- Powelliphanta marchantii
- Pupilla ficulnea
- Pupisoma sp. 1
- Setomedea nudicostata
- Soosia diodonta
- Plaited snail (Spermodea lamellata)
- Succinea sanctaehelenae
- Keeled snail (Tasmaphena lamproides)
- Vallonia declivis
- Victaphanta atramentaria

=== Littorinimorpha ===
There are 115 species in the order Littorinimorpha assessed as near threatened.

==== Hydrobiids ====
- Alzoniella braccoensis
- Alzoniella hartwigschuetti
- Alzoniella macrostoma
- Alzoniella manganellii
- Alzoniella microstoma
- Alzoniella montana
- Alzoniella rolani
- Alzoniella sigestra
- Austropyrgus colensis
- Austropyrgus foris
- Austropyrgus grampianensis
- Austropyrgus nepeanensis
- Avenionia berenguieri
- Avenionia parvula
- Avenionia roberti
- Belgrandia boscae
- Belgrandia gibba
- Belgrandia heussi
- Belgrandiella dabriana
- Belgrandiella libanica
- Bythinella badensis
- Bythinella hansboetersi
- Bythiospeum alpinum
- Bythiospeum diaphanoides
- Bythiospeum diaphanum
- Bythiospeum puerkhaueri
- Bythiospeum transsylvanica
- Bythiospeum vallei
- Catapyrgus fraterculus
- Chilopyrgula sturanyi
- Chondrobasis levantina
- Dabriana bosniaca
- Fissuria boui
- Fissuria planospira
- Fissuria raehlei
- Fluviopupa gracilis
- Fluviopupa ramsayi
- Fonscochlea zeidleri
- Greenbrier cavesnail (Fontigens turritella)
- Graziana papukensis
- Hauffenia plana
- Hauffenia subcarinata
- Hemistomia gemma
- Hydrobia accrensis
- Hydrobia brondeli
- Hydrobia lactea
- Iglica giustii
- Iglica hauffeni
- Iglica luxurians
- Iglica pezzolii
- Iglica vobarnensis
- Islamia gaiteri
- Islamia globulus
- Istriana mirnae
- Lanzaia rudnicae
- Lobogenes pusilla
- Mercuria zopissa
- Milesiana schuelei
- Nanocochlea parva
- Narentiana albida
- Ochridopyrgula macedonica
- Ohridohoratia pygmaea
- Ohridohoratia sturanyi
- Pachydrobiella brevis
- Paladilhiopsis pretneri
- Paladilhiopsis serbica
- Paraprososthenia acicula
- Paraprososthenia bollingi
- Paraprososthenia brandti
- Paraprososthenia jullei
- Paraprososthenia taylori
- Phreatica bolei
- Potamopyrgus oscitans
- Potamopyrgus troglodytes
- Pseudamnicola falkneri
- Bear Lake springsnail (Pyrgulopsis pilsbryana)
- Huachuca springsnail (Pyrgulopsis thompsoni)
- Radomaniola caputlacus
- Sheitanok amidicus
- Savannah pebblesnail (Somatogyrus tenax)
- Sororipyrgus kutukutu
- Sororipyrgus raki
- Terranigra kosovica
- Victodrobia victoriensis

==== Bithyniids ====
- Bithynia candiota
- Gabbiella rosea
- Pseudobithynia pentheri
- Pseudobithynia westerlundii

==== Moitessieriids ====
- Moitessieria heideae
- Moitessieria olleri
- Paladilhia hungarica
- Sardopaladilhia plagigeyerica
- Spiralix vitrea

==== Assimineids ====
- Omphalotropis circumlineata
- Omphalotropis zelriolata

==== Pomatiopsids ====
- Halewisia conica
- Hubendickia gochenouri
- Hubendickia microsculpta
- Hubendickia polita
- Hubendickia rolfbrandti
- Hubendickia schlickumi
- Hubendickia schuetti
- Hubendickia subulata
- Hubendickia tuberculata
- Hubendickia turneri
- Karelainia hydrorissoidea
- Lacunopsis coronata
- Lacunopsis fischerpiettei
- Lacunopsis massiei
- Pachydrobia harmandi
- Pachydrobia incerta
- Robertsiella kaporensis
- Tomichia rogersi

==== Stenothyrids ====
- Stenothyra khongi
- Stenothyra wykoffi

=== Sorbeoconcha ===
- Bridouxia ponsonbyi
- Bridouxia praeclara
- Brotia mariae
- Cleopatra grandidieri
- Spider elimia (Elimia arachnoidea)
- Savannah elimia (Elimia caelatura)
- Slowwater elimia (Elimia interveniens)
- Carved elimia (Elimia plicatastriata)
- File elimia (Elimia striatula)
- Squat elimia (Elimia variata)
- Topaz juga (Juga acutifilosa)
- Lavigeria coronata
- Geniculate river snail (Lithasia geniculata)
- Madagasikara madagascariensis
- Melanatria fluminea
- Melanoides admirabilis
- Melanoides nsendweensis
- Melanoides polymorpha
- Melanoides pupiformis
- Melanoides turritispira
- Melanopsis lorcana
- Bottle hornsnail (Pleurocera gradata)
- Skirted hornsnail (Pleurocera pyrenella)
- Potadoma liricincta
- Tanganyicia rufofilosa

=== Architaenioglossa ===
There are 41 species in the order Architaenioglossa assessed as near threatened.

==== Pupinids ====
- Pupina coxeni
- Pupina pfeifferi

==== Diplommatinids ====
- Cochlostoma asturicum
- Cochlostoma dalmatinum
- Cochlostoma euboicum
- Cochlostoma mostarensis
- Cochlostoma obscurum
- Cochlostoma pageti
- Cochlostoma parnonis
- Cochlostoma pinteri
- Cochlostoma stossichi
- Diplommatina lamellata
- Diplommatina lutea
- Moussonia fuscula
- Palaina dimorpha
- Palaina martensi
- Plectostoma christae

==== Aciculids ====
- Acicula beneckei
- Acicula disjuncta
- Acicula hausdorfi
- Acicula vezzanii
- Menkia horsti
- Platyla elisabethae
- Platyla minutissima
- Platyla orthostoma
- Platyla pezzolii
- Platyla sardoa
- Platyla subdiaphana
- Platyla talentii
- Renea kobelti
- Renea moutonii

==== Viviparids ====
- Bellamya costulata
- Bellamya jucunda
- Bellamya monardi
- Bellamya rubicunda

==== Ampullariids ====
- Afropomus balanoideus
- Lanistes elliptus
- Lanistes stuhlmanni
- Pomacea expansa

==== Craspedopomatids ====
- Craspedopoma hespericum
- Craspedopoma monizianum

=== Lower Heterobranchia species ===
- Valvata rhabdota
- Valvata stenotrema

=== Cycloneritimorpha ===
- Neritina natalensis
- Neritina rubricata
- Theodoxus anatolicus

=== Hygrophila species ===
- Biomphalaria smithi
- Bulinus cernicus
- Bulinus hightoni
- Bulinus octaploidus
- Burnupia crassistriata
- Burnupia stuhlmanni
- Ceratophallus crassus
- Gyraulus lychnidicus
- Lymnaea tumrokensis
- Mud snail (Omphiscola glabra)
- Stimulator consetti
- Stagnicola montenegrinus

=== Neogastropoda ===
There are 29 species in the order Neogastropoda assessed as near threatened.

==== Buccinids ====
- Ranella olearia
- Ranella parthenopaeum

==== Muricids ====
- Latiaxis babelis

==== Conids ====
- Conus atlanticoselvagem
- Golden cone (Conus aurantius)
- Conus boschorum
- Conus cardinalis
- Conus curassaviensis
- Conus curralensis
- Conus denizi
- Conus derrubado
- Conus diminutus
- Conus dorotheae
- Conus evorai
- Conus explorator
- Conus gauguini
- Conus josephinae
- Conus kersteni
- Kirk Ander's cone (Conus kirkandersi)
- Conus luquei
- Conus navarroi
- Conus nielsenae
- Conus nobrei
- Conus saragasae
- Conus taslei
- Conus terryni
- Conus trencarti
- Conus trochulus
- Conus zebroides

== Bivalvia ==
There are 57 species and five subspecies in the class Bivalvia assessed as near threatened.

=== Unionida ===
There are 49 species and five subspecies in the order Unionoida assessed as near threatened.

==== Unionids ====
Species

- Actinonaias pectorosa
- Amphinaias asperata
- Amphinaias houstonensis
- Amphinaias refulgens
- Anodonta vescoiana
- Rayed creekshell (Anodontoides radiatus)
- Coelatura hypsiprymna
- Cyclonaias tuberculata
- Ellipsaria lineolata
- Elliptio ahenea
- Elliptio congaraea
- Elliptio dariensis
- Yellow lance (Elliptio lanceolata)
- Fluted elephantear (Elliptio mcmichaeli)
- Altamaha lance (Elliptio shepardiana)
- Fusconaia askewi
- Tapered pigtoe (Fusconaia burkei)
- Fusconaia infucata
- Southern sandshell (Hamiota australis)
- Lampsilis bracteata
- Lampsilis cardium
- Waccamaw fatmucket (Lampsilis fullerkati)
- Lampsilis ovata
- Orangenacre mucket (Lampsilis perovalis)
- Lampsilis satura
- Leguminaia wheatleyi
- Scale shell (Leptodea leptodon)
- Tidewater mucket (Leptodea ochracea)
- Ligumia nasuta
- Medionidus conradicus
- Obovaria subrotunda
- Obovaria unicolor
- Oxynaia jourdyi
- Ohio pigtoe (Pleurobema cordatum)
- Pleurobema riddellii
- Pyramid pigtoe (Pleurobema rubrum)
- Ptychobranchus occidentalis
- Ptychobranchus subtentum
- Ptychorhynchus pfisteri
- Inflated floater (Pyganodon gibbosa)
- Rabbitsfoot (Quadrula cylindrica)
- Salamander mussel (Simpsonaias ambigua)
- Alabama creekmussel (Strophitus connasaugaensis)
- Strophitus subvexus
- Unio delphinus
- Unio mancus
- Choctaw bean (Villosa choctawensis)

Subspecies

- Lampsilis reeviana brevicula
- Lampsilis straminea claibornensis
- Lampsilis straminea straminea
- Lasmigona complanata alabamensis
- Quadrula cylindrica cylindrica

==== Hyriids ====
- Southern river mussel (Hyridella narracanensis)
- South Esk freshwater mussel (Velesunio moretonicus)

=== Cardiida ===
- Bear paw clam (Hippopus hippopus)
- China clam (Hippopus porcellanus)
- Maxima clam (Tridacna maxima)
- Fluted giant clam (Tridacna squamosa)

=== Venerida ===
- Dreissena presbensis
- Pisidium montigenum
- Sphaerium austeni
- Sphaerium solidum

== Cephalopods ==
- Giant Australian cuttlefish (Sepia apama)

== See also ==
- Lists of IUCN Red List near threatened species
- List of least concern molluscs
- List of vulnerable molluscs
- List of endangered molluscs
- List of critically endangered molluscs
- List of recently extinct molluscs
- List of data deficient molluscs
