= Pupisoma sp. nov. 1 =

Conservation status
- Near Threatened (IUCN 2.3)

Scientific classification
- Domain: Eukaryota
- Kingdom: Animalia
- Phylum: Mollusca
- Class: Gastropoda
- Order: Stylommatophora
- Family: Valloniidae
- Genus: Pupisoma
- Species: P. sp. nov. 1

Binomial name
- Pupisoma sp. nov. 1

Species of gastropod

Pupisoma sp. nov. 1 is an undescribed species of minute land snail, a terrestrial pulmonate gastropod mollusc or micromollusk in the family Valloniidae. This species is endemic to Nicaragua and was classified as near threatened in 1996, but no other information is given by the IUCN.
