= Slowwater elimia =

Conservation status
- Near Threatened (IUCN 3.1)

- Imperiled (NatureServe)

Scientific classification
- Kingdom: Animalia
- Phylum: Mollusca
- Class: Gastropoda
- Subclass: Caenogastropoda
- Order: incertae sedis
- Family: Pleuroceridae
- Genus: Elimia
- Species: E. interveniens

Binomial name
- Elimia interveniens I. Lea, 1862

Species of gastropod

The slowwater elimia (Elimia interveniens) is a species of freshwater snail with an operculum, aquatic gastropod mollusks in the family Pleuroceridae. This species is endemic to the United States.
