= Lanistes stuhlmanni =

Conservation status
- Near Threatened (IUCN 3.1)

Scientific classification
- Kingdom: Animalia
- Phylum: Mollusca
- Class: Gastropoda
- Subclass: Caenogastropoda
- Order: Architaenioglossa
- Family: Ampullariidae
- Genus: Lanistes
- Species: L. stuhlmanni

Binomial name
- Lanistes stuhlmanni Martens

Species of gastropod

Lanistes stuhlmanni is a species of large freshwater snail, an aquatic gastropod mollusc with a gill and an operculum in the family Ampullariidae, the apple snails.

It is endemic to Tanzania.
