= Dirutrachia sublevata =

Conservation status
- Near Threatened (IUCN 2.3)

Scientific classification
- Kingdom: Animalia
- Phylum: Mollusca
- Class: Gastropoda
- Order: Stylommatophora
- Family: Camaenidae
- Genus: Dirutrachia
- Species: D. sublevata

Binomial name
- Dirutrachia sublevata (Tate, 1894)

Synonyms
- Hadra sublevata Tate, 1894; Semotrachia sublevata (Tate, 1894)

Species of gastropod

Dirutrachia sublevata is a species of air-breathing land snail, a terrestrial pulmonate gastropod mollusk in the family Camaenidae. This species is endemic to Australia.
