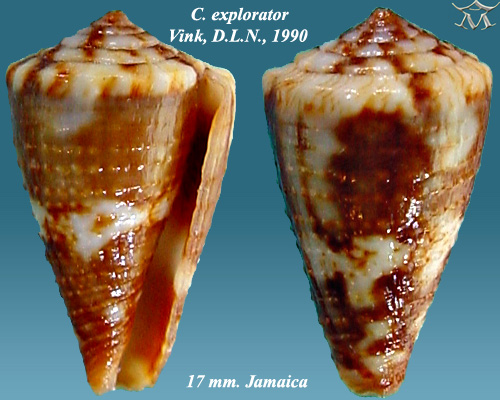
- Apertural and abapertural views of shell of Conus explorator Vink, D.L.N., 1990
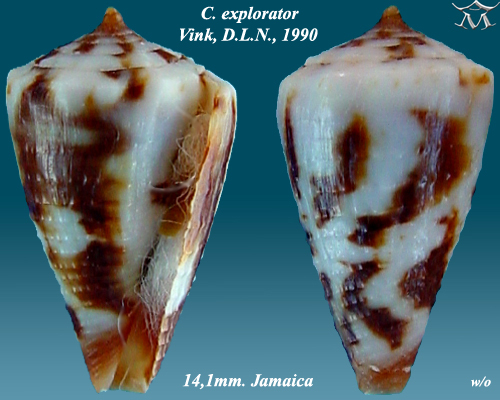

Conservation status
- Near Threatened (IUCN 3.1)

Scientific classification
- Kingdom: Animalia
- Phylum: Mollusca
- Class: Gastropoda
- Subclass: Caenogastropoda
- Order: Neogastropoda
- Superfamily: Conoidea
- Family: Conidae
- Genus: Conus
- Species: C. explorator

Binomial name
- Conus explorator Vink, 1990

Synonyms
- Conus (Dauciconus) explorator Vink, 1990 · accepted, alternate representation; Purpuriconus explorator (Vink, 1990)

= Conus explorator =

Species of sea snail

Conus explorator is a species of sea snail, a marine gastropod mollusk in the family Conidae, the cone snails and their allies.

Like all species within the genus Conus, these snails are predatory and venomous. They are capable of stinging humans, therefore live ones should be handled carefully or not at all.

== Description ==
The size of the shell varies between 14.3 mm and 25 mm.

== Distribution ==
This species occurs in the Caribbean Sea off Jamaica.
