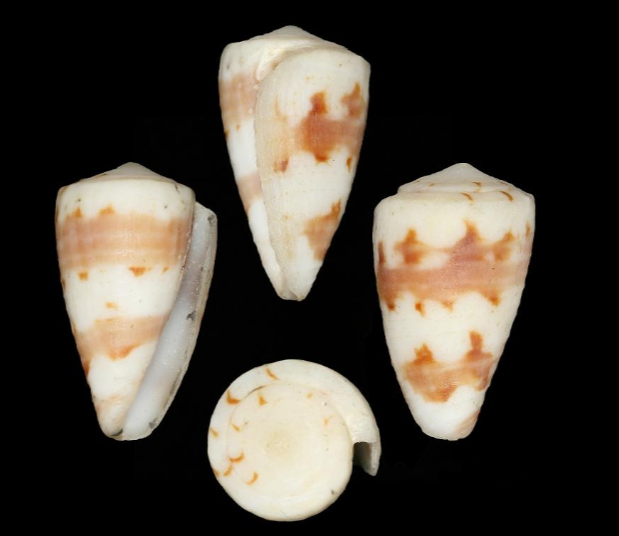
- Shell and protoconch of Conus kirkandersi (holotype at the Smithsonian Institution)

Conservation status
- Near Threatened (IUCN 3.1)

Scientific classification
- Kingdom: Animalia
- Phylum: Mollusca
- Class: Gastropoda
- Subclass: Caenogastropoda
- Order: Neogastropoda
- Superfamily: Conoidea
- Family: Conidae
- Genus: Conus
- Species: C. kirkandersi

Binomial name
- Conus kirkandersi Petuch, 1987

Synonyms
- Conus (Dauciconus) kirkandersi Petuch, 1987 · accepted, alternate representation; Purpuriconus kirkandersi (Petuch, 1987)

= Conus kirkandersi =

Species of sea snail

Conus kirkandersi is a species of sea snail, a marine gastropod mollusk in the family Conidae, the cone snails, cone shells or cones.

These snails are predatory and venomous. They are capable of stinging humans.

== Description ==
Original description: "Shell small for genus, thick, heavy, squat; spire low, almost flattened; shoulder rounded smooth, without coronations; body whorl sculptured with 12-15 large, raised spiral cords and numerous fine spiral threads, giving shell rough appearance; lip of adults thickened; shell color pure white with 2 broad bands, one above mid-body and one below mid-body; bands often break up into large brown blotches and flammules; anterior tip of shell brown; several rows of dark brown spots often superimposed upon brown bands; spire white with evenly-spaced, dark brown, crescent-shaped flammules; protoconch and early whorls yellow; interior of aperture white with 2 brown bands, corresponding to external color bands; periostracum thick, brown, tufted along shoulder; animal bright red."

The size of the shell varies between 14 mm and 26 mm.

== Distribution ==
Locus typicus: "North end of Cozumel Island, Quintana Roo, Mexico."

This marine species of Cone snail occurs in the Caribbean Sea off Mexico.
