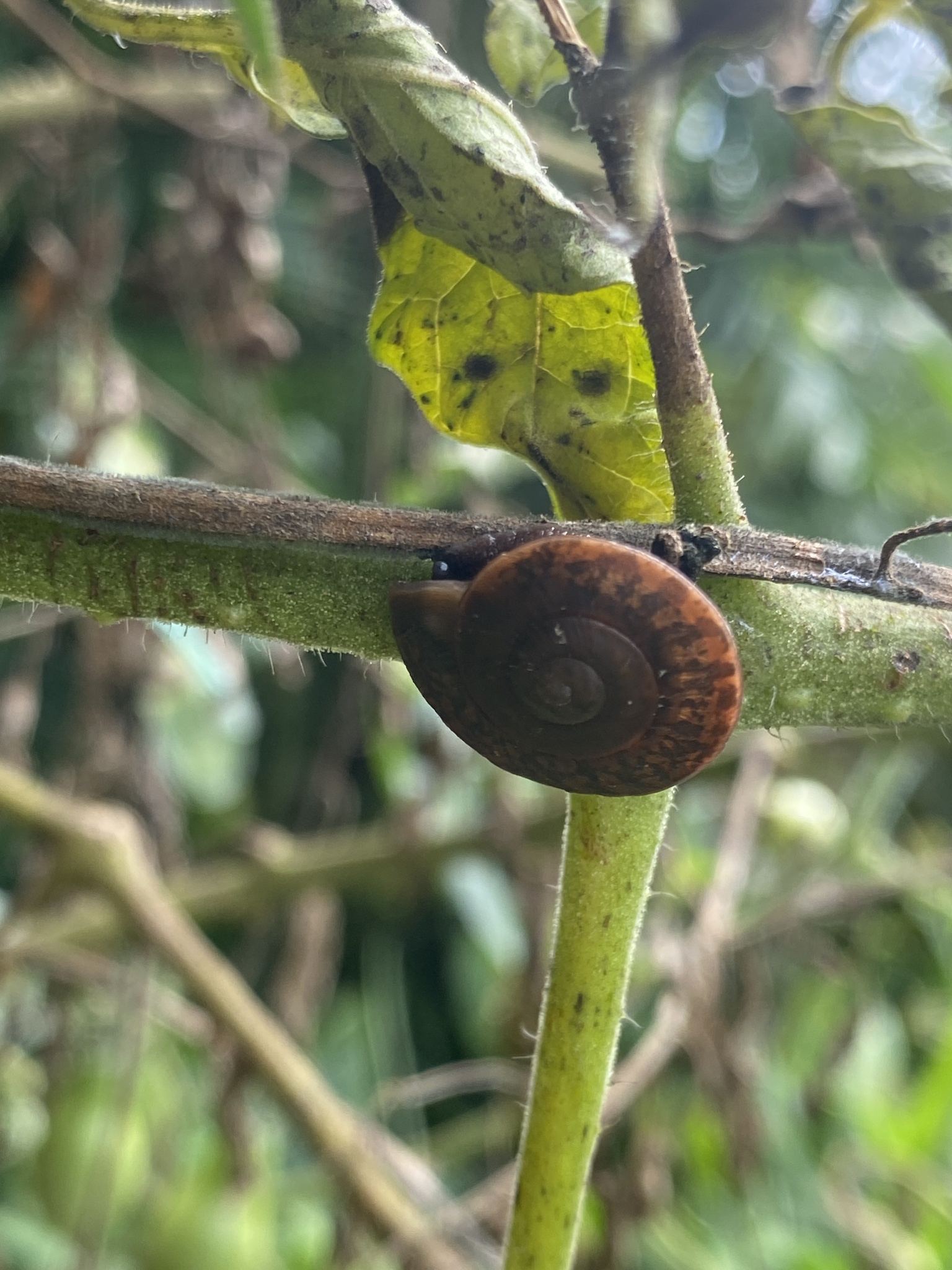

Conservation status
- Near Threatened (IUCN 2.3)

Scientific classification
- Kingdom: Animalia
- Phylum: Mollusca
- Class: Gastropoda
- Order: Stylommatophora
- Family: Camaenidae
- Genus: Jacksonena; Iredale, 1937
- Species: J. rudis

Binomial name
- Jacksonena rudis (Hedley, 1912)

= Jacksonena =

Atherton Tableland keeled snail

Genus of gastropods

Jacksonena is a genus of air-breathing land snails, terrestrial pulmonate gastropod mollusks in the family Camaenidae. It is monotypic, being represented by the single species Jacksonena rudis, commonly known as the Atherton Tableland keeled snail. This species is endemic to Australia.
