= Pleurobema riddellii =

Conservation status
- Near Threatened (IUCN 2.3)

- Critically Imperiled (NatureServe)

Scientific classification
- Kingdom: Animalia
- Phylum: Mollusca
- Class: Bivalvia
- Order: Unionida
- Family: Unionidae
- Genus: Pleurobema
- Species: P. riddellii

Binomial name
- Pleurobema riddellii (I. Lea, 1861)

Species of bivalve

Pleurobema riddellii, the Louisiana pigtoe, is a species of freshwater mussel, an aquatic bivalve mollusk in the family Unionidae, the river mussels.

This species is endemic to the United States.
