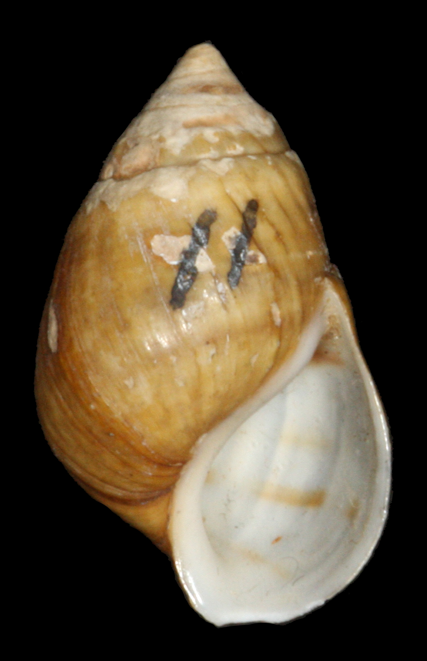
- This shell is the lectotype of Elimia variata (USNM 118756).

Conservation status
- Near Threatened (IUCN 3.1)

- Imperiled (NatureServe)

Scientific classification
- Kingdom: Animalia
- Phylum: Mollusca
- Class: Gastropoda
- Subclass: Caenogastropoda
- Order: incertae sedis
- Family: Pleuroceridae
- Genus: Elimia
- Species: E. variata

Binomial name
- Elimia variata (I. Lea, 1861)

= Squat elimia =

Species of gastropod

The squat elimia (Elimia variata) is a species of freshwater snail with an operculum, aquatic gastropod mollusk in the family Pleuroceridae. This species is endemic to the United States.
