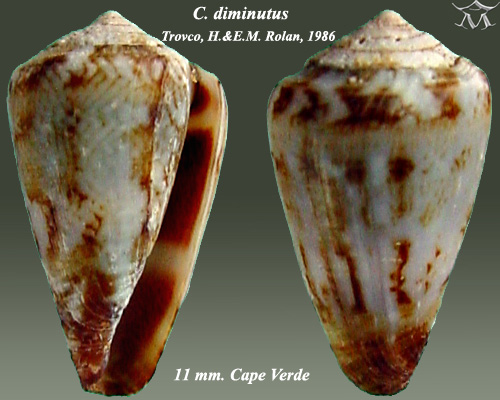
- Apertural and abapertural views of shell of Conus diminutus Trovão, H. & E.M. Rolan, 1986
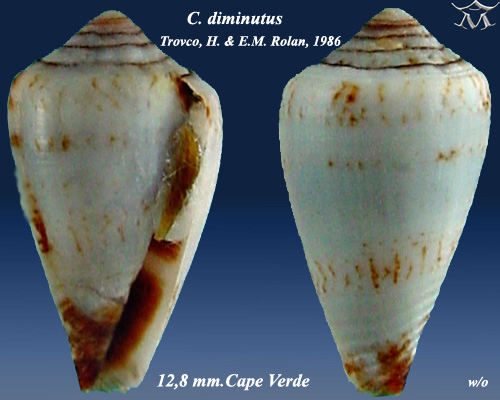

Conservation status
- Near Threatened (IUCN 3.1)

Scientific classification
- Kingdom: Animalia
- Phylum: Mollusca
- Class: Gastropoda
- Subclass: Caenogastropoda
- Order: Neogastropoda
- Superfamily: Conoidea
- Family: Conidae
- Genus: Conus
- Species: C. diminutus

Binomial name
- Conus diminutus Trovão & Rolán, 1986

Synonyms
- Africonus diminutus (Trovão & Rolán, 1986); Conus (Lautoconus) diminutus Trovão & Rolán, 1986 · accepted, alternate representation; Conus morroensis (Cossignani & Fiadeiro, 2014)

= Conus diminutus =

Species of sea snail

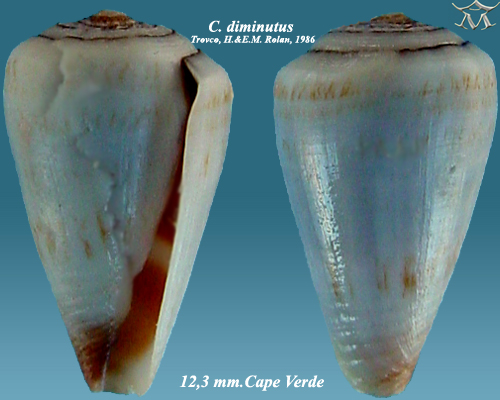
Apertural and abapertural views of shell of Conus diminutus Trovão, H. & E.M. Rolan, 1986, showing variation in the species.

Conus diminutus is a species of sea snail, a marine gastropod mollusk in the family Conidae, the cone snails and their allies.

Like all species within the genus Conus, these snails are predatory and venomous. They are capable of stinging humans, therefore live ones should be handled carefully or not at all.

== Description ==
The size of the shell varies between 9 mm and 22 mm.

== Distribution ==
This species occurs in the Atlantic Ocean along the west coast of the island Boa Vista, Cape Verde and Senegal.
