= Cupedora marcidum =

Conservation status
- Near Threatened (IUCN 2.3)

Scientific classification
- Kingdom: Animalia
- Phylum: Mollusca
- Class: Gastropoda
- Order: Stylommatophora
- Family: Camaenidae
- Genus: Cupedora
- Species: C. marcidum

Binomial name
- Cupedora marcidum Hedley, 1912

Species of gastropod

Cupedora marcidum is a species of air-breathing land snail, a terrestrial pulmonate gastropod mollusk in the family Camaenidae, and is endemic to Australia.

The species was first described as Xanthomelon marcidum in 1912 by Charles Hedley, from specimens collected on "Uabba Range, twelve miles west of l.ake Cudgellico, Central New South Wales".
