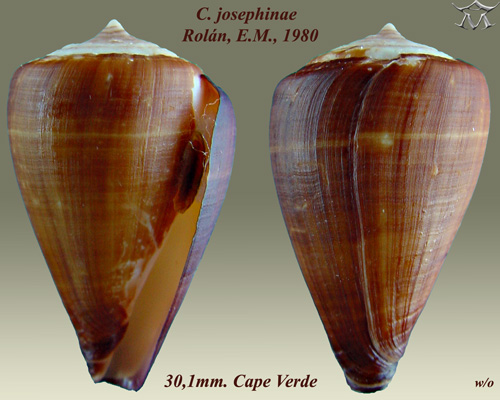
- Apertural and abapertural views of shell of Conus josephinae Rolán, E.M., 1980

Conservation status
- Near Threatened (IUCN 3.1)

Scientific classification
- Kingdom: Animalia
- Phylum: Mollusca
- Class: Gastropoda
- Subclass: Caenogastropoda
- Order: Neogastropoda
- Superfamily: Conoidea
- Family: Conidae
- Genus: Conus
- Species: C. josephinae

Binomial name
- Conus josephinae Rolán (Mosquera), 1980

Synonyms
- Africonus demisgeraldoi Cossignani & Fiadeiro, 2018; Africonus guiandradoi Cossignani & Fiadeiro, 2017 (original combination); Africonus josephinae (Rolán, 1980); Africonus marckeppensi Cossignani & Fiadeiro, 2017; Conus (Lautoconus) josephinae Rolán, 1980 · accepted, alternate representation; Lautoconus (Africonus) josephinae (Rolán, 1980) ·

= Conus josephinae =

Species of sea snail

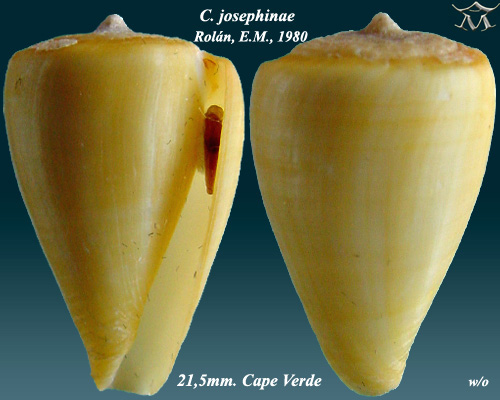
Apertural and abapertural views of shell of Conus josephinae Rolán, E.M., 1980, showing variation in the species.

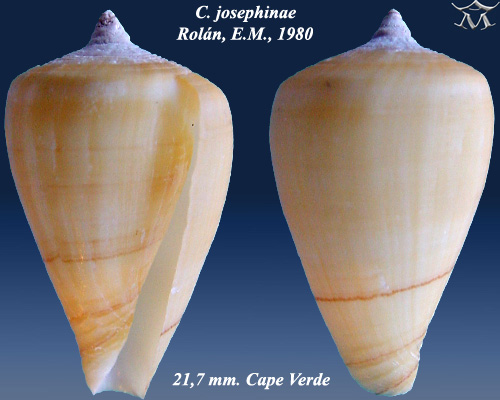
Apertural and abapertural views of shell of Conus josephinae Rolán, E.M., 1980, showing variation in the species.

Conus josephinae is a species of sea snail, a marine gastropod mollusk in the family Conidae, the cone snails and their allies.

Like all species within the genus Conus, these snails are predatory and venomous. They are capable of stinging humans, therefore live ones should be handled carefully or not at all.

== Description ==
The size of the shell varies between 20 mm and 31 mm.

== Distribution ==
This species occurs in the Eastern Atlantic Ocean off the Cape Verdes.
