= Potamopyrgus oscitans =

Conservation status
- Near Threatened (IUCN 2.3)

Scientific classification
- Kingdom: Animalia
- Phylum: Mollusca
- Class: Gastropoda
- Subclass: Caenogastropoda
- Order: Littorinimorpha
- Family: Tateidae
- Genus: Potamopyrgus
- Species: P. oscitans

Binomial name
- Potamopyrgus oscitans Iredale, 1944

Species of gastropod

Potamopyrgus oscitans is a species of small freshwater snail with an operculum, an aquatic gastropod mollusc or micromollusc in the family Hydrobiidae. This species is endemic to Australia.
