= Elliptio congaraea =

Conservation status
- Near Threatened (IUCN 2.3)

- Vulnerable (NatureServe)

Scientific classification
- Kingdom: Animalia
- Phylum: Mollusca
- Class: Bivalvia
- Order: Unionida
- Family: Unionidae
- Genus: Elliptio
- Species: E. congaraea

Binomial name
- Elliptio congaraea I. Lea, 1831

Species of bivalve

Elliptio congaraea, the Carolina slabshell, is a species of freshwater mussel, an aquatic bivalve mollusk in the family Unionidae, the river mussels.

== Distribution ==
This species is endemic to the southeastern United States.
