= Amplirhagada montalivetensis =

Conservation status
- Near Threatened (IUCN 2.3)

Scientific classification
- Kingdom: Animalia
- Phylum: Mollusca
- Class: Gastropoda
- Order: Stylommatophora
- Family: Camaenidae
- Genus: Amplirhagada
- Species: A. montalivetensis

Binomial name
- Amplirhagada montalivetensis Smith, 1894

Species of gastropod

Amplirhagada montalivetensis is a species of air-breathing land snail, a terrestrial pulmonate gastropod mollusks in the family Camaenidae. This species is endemic to Australia.
