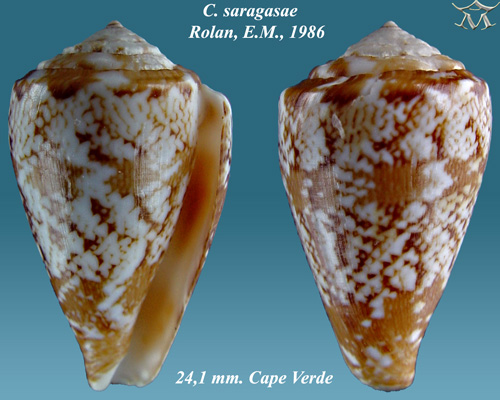
- Apertural and abapertural views of shell of Conus saragasae Rolan, E.M., 1986
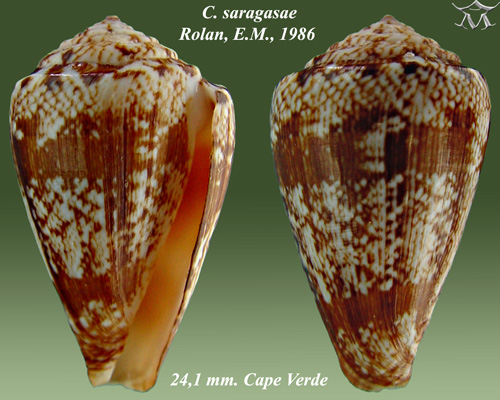

Conservation status
- Near Threatened (IUCN 3.1)

Scientific classification
- Kingdom: Animalia
- Phylum: Mollusca
- Class: Gastropoda
- Subclass: Caenogastropoda
- Order: Neogastropoda
- Superfamily: Conoidea
- Family: Conidae
- Genus: Conus
- Species: C. saragasae

Binomial name
- Conus saragasae Rolán, 1986

Synonyms
- Africonus saragasae (Rolán, 1986); Conus (Lautoconus) saragassae Rolán, 1986 · accepted, alternate representation

= Conus saragasae =

Species of sea snail

Conus saragasae is a species of sea snail, a marine gastropod mollusk in the family Conidae, the cone snails and their allies.

Like all species within the genus Conus, these snails are predatory and venomous. They are capable of stinging humans, therefore live ones should be handled carefully or not at all.

== Description ==
The size of the shell varies between 18 mm and 25 mm. The shell is conical, with a short, scarcely stepped spire. The pattern consists of three bands of reddish-brown with a few white dots; the upper one is on the shoulder. Between these bands appear others of the same color but reticulated with white. Shell up to 30 mm.

== Distribution ==
Only known from the west coast of São Vicente and the south coast of Santa Luzia. It is a Capverdian endemic and a species at high risk of extinction.
