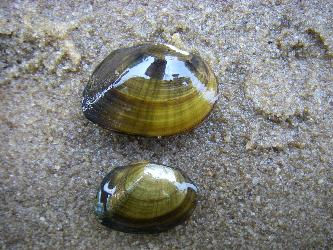

Conservation status
- Near Threatened (IUCN 3.1)

- Endangered (ESA)

Scientific classification
- Domain: Eukaryota
- Kingdom: Animalia
- Phylum: Mollusca
- Class: Bivalvia
- Order: Unionida
- Family: Unionidae
- Genus: Villosa
- Species: V. choctawensis

Binomial name
- Villosa choctawensis Athearn, 1964

= Choctaw bean =

Species of bivalve

The Choctaw bean (Villosa choctawensis) is a species of freshwater mussel, an aquatic bivalve mollusc in the family Unionidae. This species is found in the southeastern United States and is currently on the endangered species list. The species epithet and the common name are based on the name of the Choctaw people, Native Americans who were originally from the southeastern United States.
