= Strophitus subvexus =

Conservation status
- Near Threatened (IUCN 2.3)

Scientific classification
- Kingdom: Animalia
- Phylum: Mollusca
- Class: Bivalvia
- Order: Unionida
- Family: Unionidae
- Genus: Strophitus
- Species: S. subvexus

Binomial name
- Strophitus subvexus (Conrad, 1834)

Species of bivalve

Strophitus subvexus is a species of freshwater mussel, an aquatic bivalve mollusk in the family Unionidae, the river mussels.

This species is endemic to the United States.
