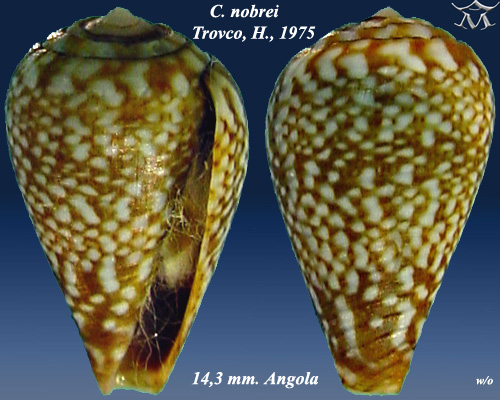
- Apertural and abapertural views of shell of Conus nobrei Trovão, H., 1975
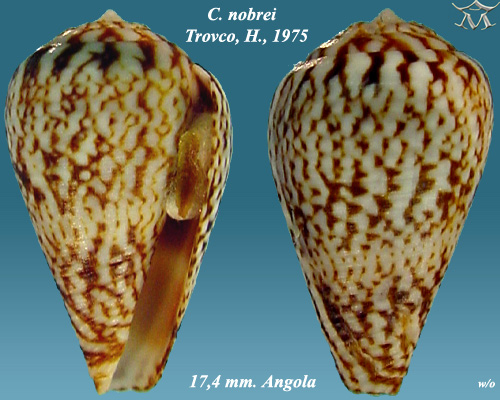

Conservation status
- Near Threatened (IUCN 3.1)

Scientific classification
- Kingdom: Animalia
- Phylum: Mollusca
- Class: Gastropoda
- Subclass: Caenogastropoda
- Order: Neogastropoda
- Superfamily: Conoidea
- Family: Conidae
- Genus: Conus
- Species: C. nobrei

Binomial name
- Conus nobrei Trovão, H., 1975

Synonyms
- Conus (Lautoconus) nobrei Trovão, 1975 · accepted, alternate representation; Varioconus nobrei Trovão, H., 1975

= Conus nobrei =

Species of sea snail

Conus nobrei is a species of predatory sea snail, a marine gastropod mollusk in the family Conidae, the cone snails, cone shells or cones.

Like all species within the genus Conus, these snails are predatory and venomous. They are capable of stinging humans, therefore live ones should be handled carefully or not at all.

== Description ==
The size of the shell varies between 12 mm and 20 mm.

== Distribution ==
This marine species is endemic to Angola.
