= Elliptio shepardiana =

Conservation status
- Near Threatened (IUCN 2.3)

- Apparently Secure (NatureServe)

Scientific classification
- Kingdom: Animalia
- Phylum: Mollusca
- Class: Bivalvia
- Order: Unionida
- Family: Unionidae
- Genus: Elliptio
- Species: E. shepardiana

Binomial name
- Elliptio shepardiana I. Lea, 1834

Species of bivalve

Elliptio shepardiana, the Altamaha lance, is a species of freshwater mussel, an aquatic bivalve mollusk in the family Unionidae, the river mussels, naiads or unionids.

This species is endemic to the United States.
