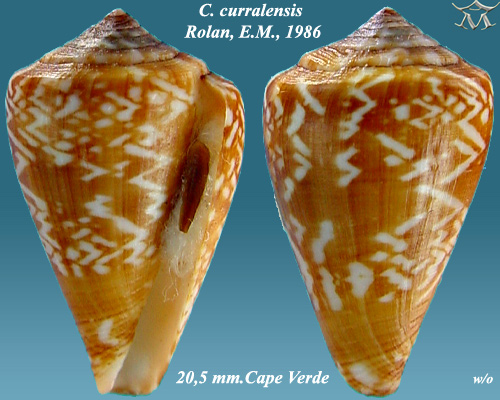
- Apertural and abapertural views of shell of Conus curralensis Rolan, E.M., 1986
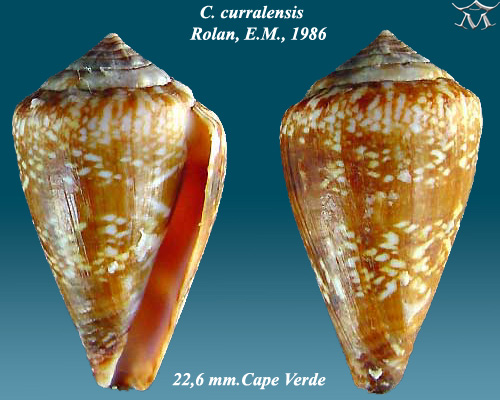

Conservation status
- Near Threatened (IUCN 3.1)

Scientific classification
- Kingdom: Animalia
- Phylum: Mollusca
- Class: Gastropoda
- Subclass: Caenogastropoda
- Order: Neogastropoda
- Superfamily: Conoidea
- Family: Conidae
- Genus: Conus
- Species: C. curralensis

Binomial name
- Conus curralensis Rolán, 1986

Synonyms
- Africonus curralensis (Rolán, 1986); Conus (Lautoconus) curralensis Rolán, 1986 · accepted, alternate representation

= Conus curralensis =

Species of sea snail

Conus curralensis is a species of marine gastropod mollusk in the cone snail genus Conus.

Like all species within the genus Conus, these snails are predatory and venomous. They are capable of stinging humans, so live ones should be handled carefully or not at all.

== Description ==
The size of the shell varies between 20 mm and 25 mm.

== Distribution ==
This species occurs in the Atlantic Ocean off of Cape Verde.
