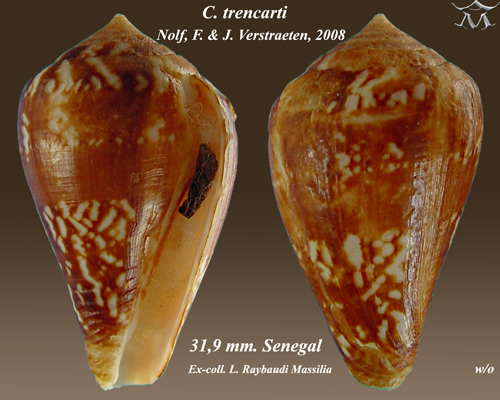
- Apertural and abapertural views of shell of Conus trencarti Nolf, F. & J. Verstraeten, 2008

Scientific classification
- Kingdom: Animalia
- Phylum: Mollusca
- Class: Gastropoda
- Subclass: Caenogastropoda
- Order: Neogastropoda
- Superfamily: Conoidea
- Family: Conidae
- Genus: Conus
- Species: C. trencarti

Binomial name
- Conus trencarti Nolf & Verstraeten, 2008

Synonyms
- Conus (Lautoconus) trencarti Nolf & Verstraeten, 2008 · accepted, alternate representation; Lautoconus trencarti (Nolf & Verstraeten, 2008)

= Conus trencarti =

Species of sea snail

Conus trencarti is a species of sea snail, a marine gastropod mollusc in the family Conidae, the cone snails and their allies.

Like all species within the genus Conus, these snails are predatory and venomous. They are capable of stinging humans, therefore live ones should be handled carefully or not at all.

== Description ==
The size of the shell varies between 20 mm and 27 mm.

== Distribution ==
This species occurs in the Atlantic Ocean off Senegal.
