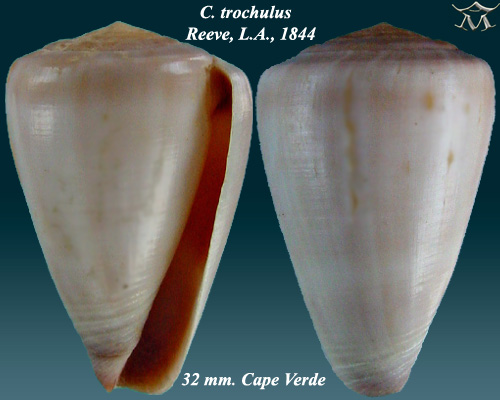
- Apertural and abapertural views of shell of Conus trochulus Reeve, L.A., 1844
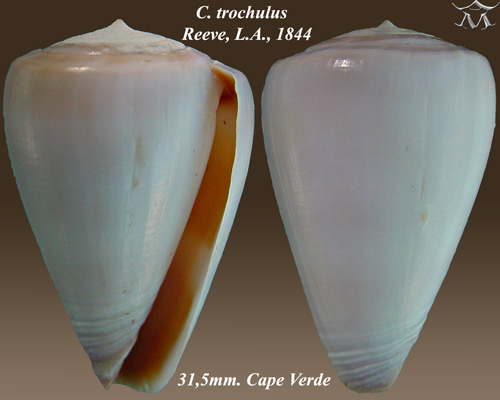

Conservation status
- Near Threatened (IUCN 3.1)

Scientific classification
- Kingdom: Animalia
- Phylum: Mollusca
- Class: Gastropoda
- Subclass: Caenogastropoda
- Order: Neogastropoda
- Superfamily: Conoidea
- Family: Conidae
- Genus: Conus
- Species: C. trochulus

Binomial name
- Conus trochulus Reeve, 1844

Synonyms
- Africonus cazalisoi T. Cossignani & Fiadeiro, 2018; Conus atlanticoselvagem Afonso & Tenorio, 2004; Conus (Kalloconus) trochulus Reeve, 1844 lternate representation; Conus atlanticoselvagem Afonso & M. Tenorio, 2004; Kalloconus (Trovaoconus) stanchinensis T. Cossignani & Fiadeiro, 2019; Kalloconus (Trovaoconus) trochulus (Reeve, 1844); Kalloconus stanchinensis T. Cossignani & Fiadeiro, 2019 (original combination); Kalloconus trochulus (Reeve, 1844); Trovaoconus atlanticoselvagem (Afonso & M. Tenorio, 2004); Trovaoconus trochulus (Reeve, 1844)

= Conus trochulus =

Species of sea snail

Conus trochulus is a species of sea snail, a marine gastropod mollusk in the family Conidae, the cone snails and their relatives.

Like all species within the genus Conus, these snails are predatory and venomous. They are capable of stinging humans, therefore live ones should be handled carefully or not at all.

== Description ==
The size of the shell varies between 18 mm and 50 mm. The shell is white, with usually a violet tinge. The interior of the aperture is light violet.

== Distribution ==
This species occurs in the Atlantic Ocean off the islands of Boa Vista and Maio, Cape Verde. It is listed as near threatened by the IUCN.
