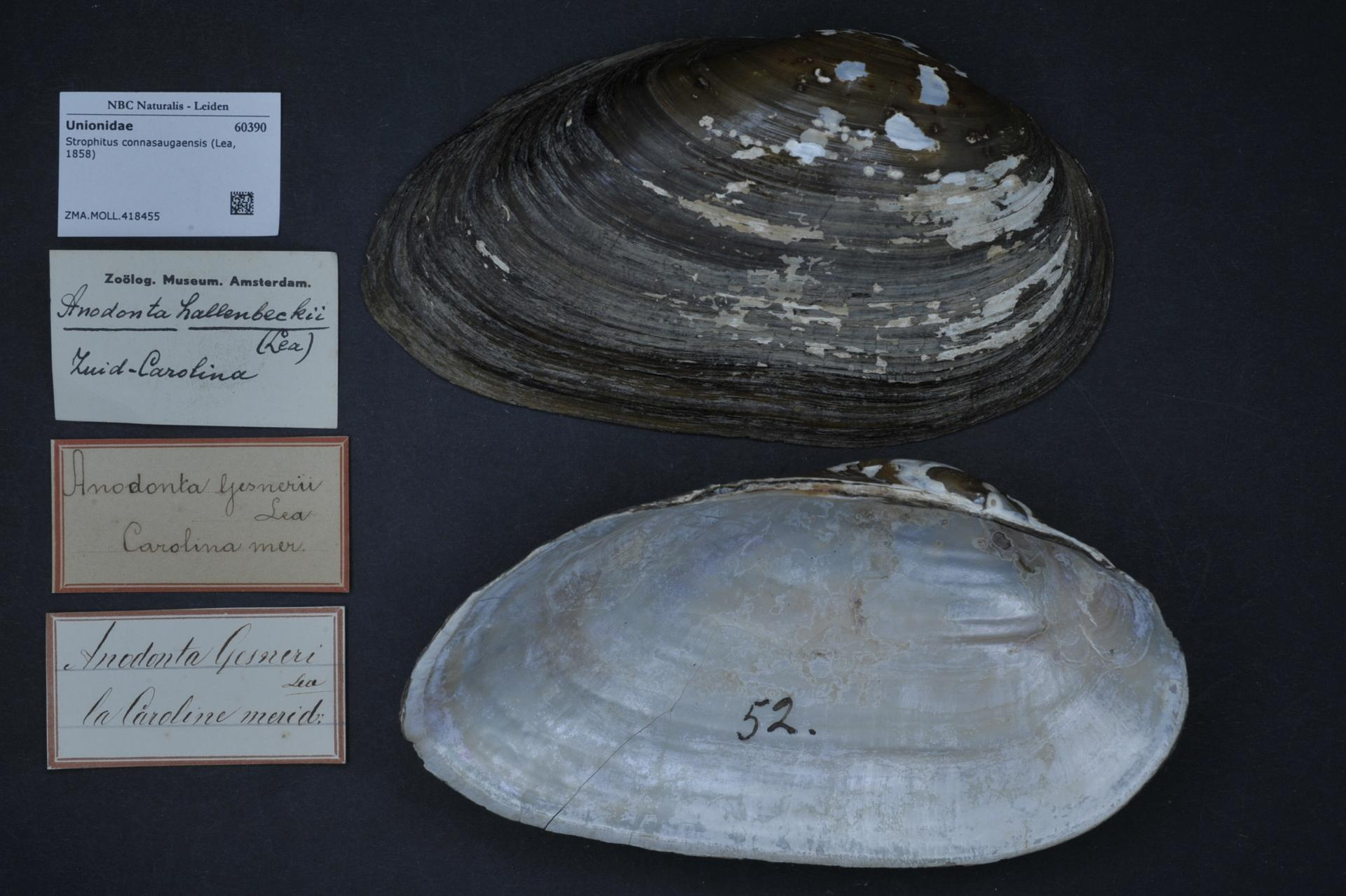

Conservation status
- Near Threatened (IUCN 3.1)

Scientific classification
- Kingdom: Animalia
- Phylum: Mollusca
- Class: Bivalvia
- Order: Unionida
- Family: Unionidae
- Genus: Strophitus
- Species: S. connasaugaensis

Binomial name
- Strophitus connasaugaensis (I. Lea, 1858)

= Strophitus connasaugaensis =

Species of bivalve

Strophitus connasaugaensis is a species of freshwater mussel, an aquatic bivalve mollusk in the family Unionidae, the river mussels.

This species is endemic to the United States.
