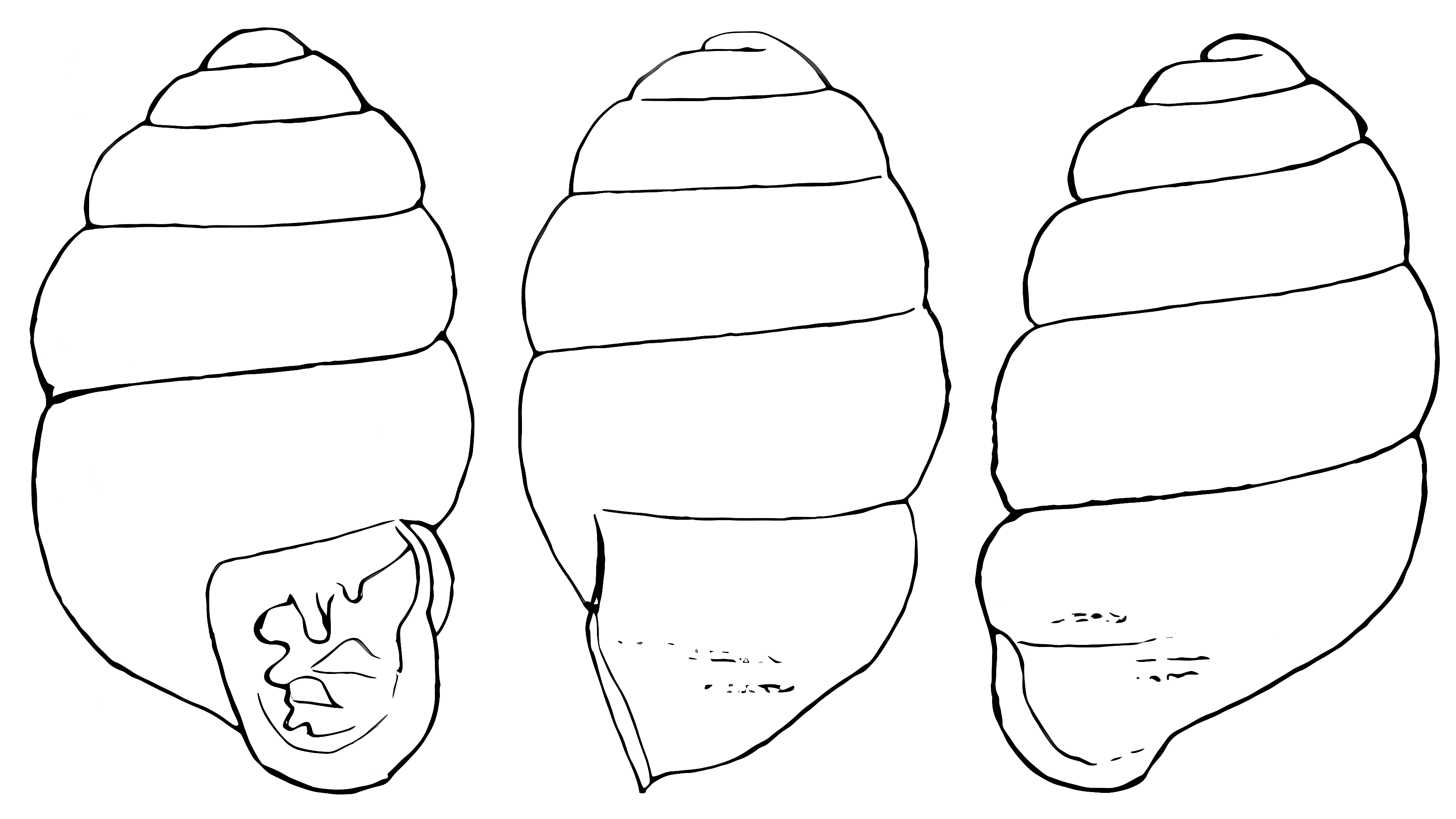
- Original drawing of a shell of Vertigo alabamensis

Conservation status
- Near Threatened (IUCN 2.3)

Scientific classification
- Kingdom: Animalia
- Phylum: Mollusca
- Class: Gastropoda
- Order: Stylommatophora
- Family: Vertiginidae
- Subfamily: Vertigininae
- Genus: Vertigo
- Species: V. alabamensis

Binomial name
- Vertigo alabamensis Clapp, 1915

Synonyms
- Vertigo (Vertilla) alabamensis Clapp, 1915 · alternate representation; Vertigo alabamensis conecuhensis G. H. Clapp, 1915(junior synonym)

= Alabama vertigo =

Species of gastropod

The Alabama vertigo (Vertigo alabamensis) is a species of land snail in the family Vertiginidae, the whorl snails.

== Description ==
The length of the shell attains 1.8 mm, its diameter 1 mm.

(Original description) The convex shell is cylindric-oval and perforate. The sutures are well impressed. The body whorl is somewhat tapering below, bulging above, and deeply constricted over the palatal folds. The crest is well marked. The outer lip well is reflected, pale brown, and deeply constricted opposite the upper palatal, simple above the constriction, and with a strong callous or internal collar running down and connecting with the columella. It contains seven denticles. The parietal is high, sinuous and deeply entering. Angular strong, flat. The upper palatal is deep, very high in front and tapering to the rear. The lower palatal is very deeply seated. The inner end back of the subcolumellar lamella, both palatals distinctly showing from the outside as white lines. The columellar lamella are strong flat. The subcolumellar is bifid and strong. The basal fold is distinct, set on the callous collar just below the subcolumellar lamella.

== Distribution ==
It is native to the United States, where it occurs in parts of North Carolina, South Carolina, Alabama, Florida, and Georgia.

The snail lives in pine savanna, bay forest, and bog habitat. The young hatch in spring. Adult shells can be found during spring and early summer, but they are mostly gone by late summer.
