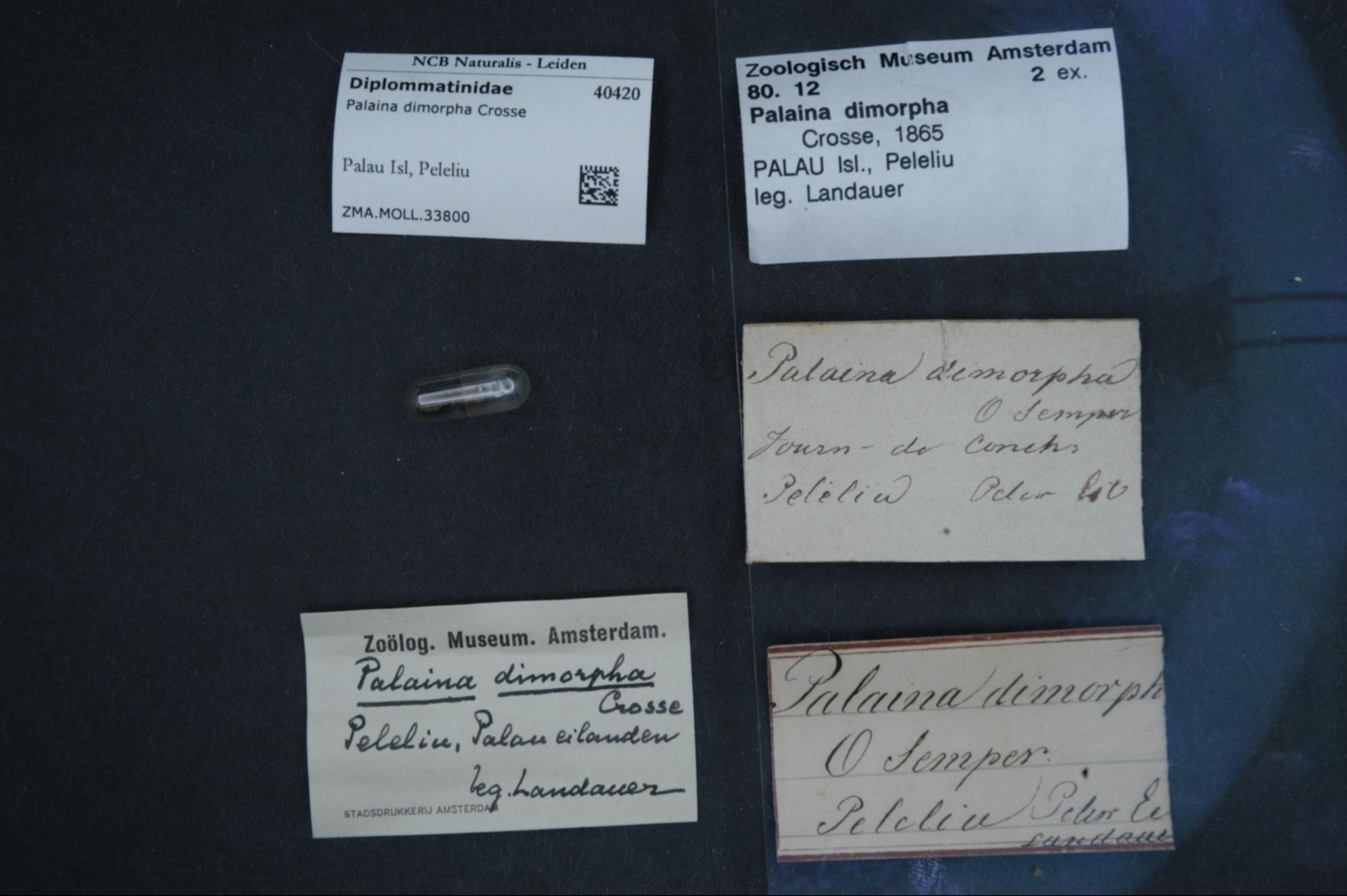
- Specimen of Palaina dimorpha at Naturalis Biodiversity Center

Conservation status
- Near Threatened (IUCN 3.1)

Scientific classification
- Kingdom: Animalia
- Phylum: Mollusca
- Class: Gastropoda
- Subclass: Caenogastropoda
- Order: Architaenioglossa
- Family: Diplommatinidae
- Genus: Palaina
- Species: P. dimorpha

Binomial name
- Palaina dimorpha (Crosse, 1866)

= Palaina dimorpha =

Species of gastropod

Palaina dimorpha is a species of minute land snail with an operculum, a terrestrial gastropod mollusk or micromollusks in the family Diplommatinidae. This species is endemic to Palau. It is distinguished from other similar species thanks to its bright coloration.
