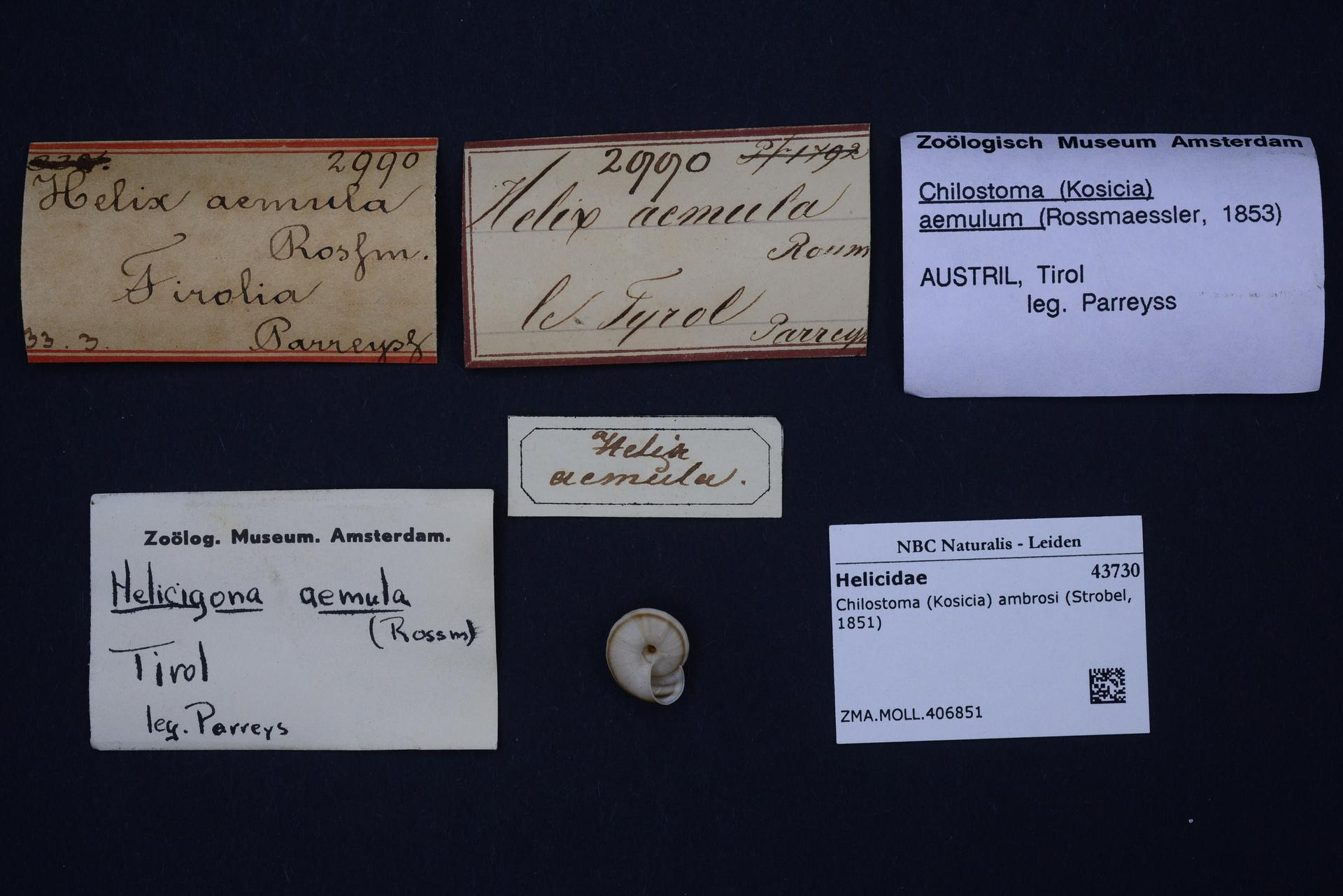
- Kosicia ambrosi shell

Conservation status
- Near Threatened (IUCN 3.1)

Scientific classification
- Kingdom: Animalia
- Phylum: Mollusca
- Class: Gastropoda
- Order: Stylommatophora
- Family: Helicidae
- Genus: Kosicia
- Species: K. ambrosi

Binomial name
- Kosicia ambrosi (Strobel, 1851)

Synonyms
- Chilostoma ambrosi (Strobel, 1852); Helix aemula L. Pfeiffer, 1852; Helix ambrosi Strobel, 1852

= Kosicia ambrosi =

Species of gastropod

Kosicia ambrosi is a species of medium-sized, air-breathing, land snail, a terrestrial pulmonate gastropod mollusc in the family Helicidae, the true snails. The species is endemic to Italy, and is currently Near threatened due to tourism.
