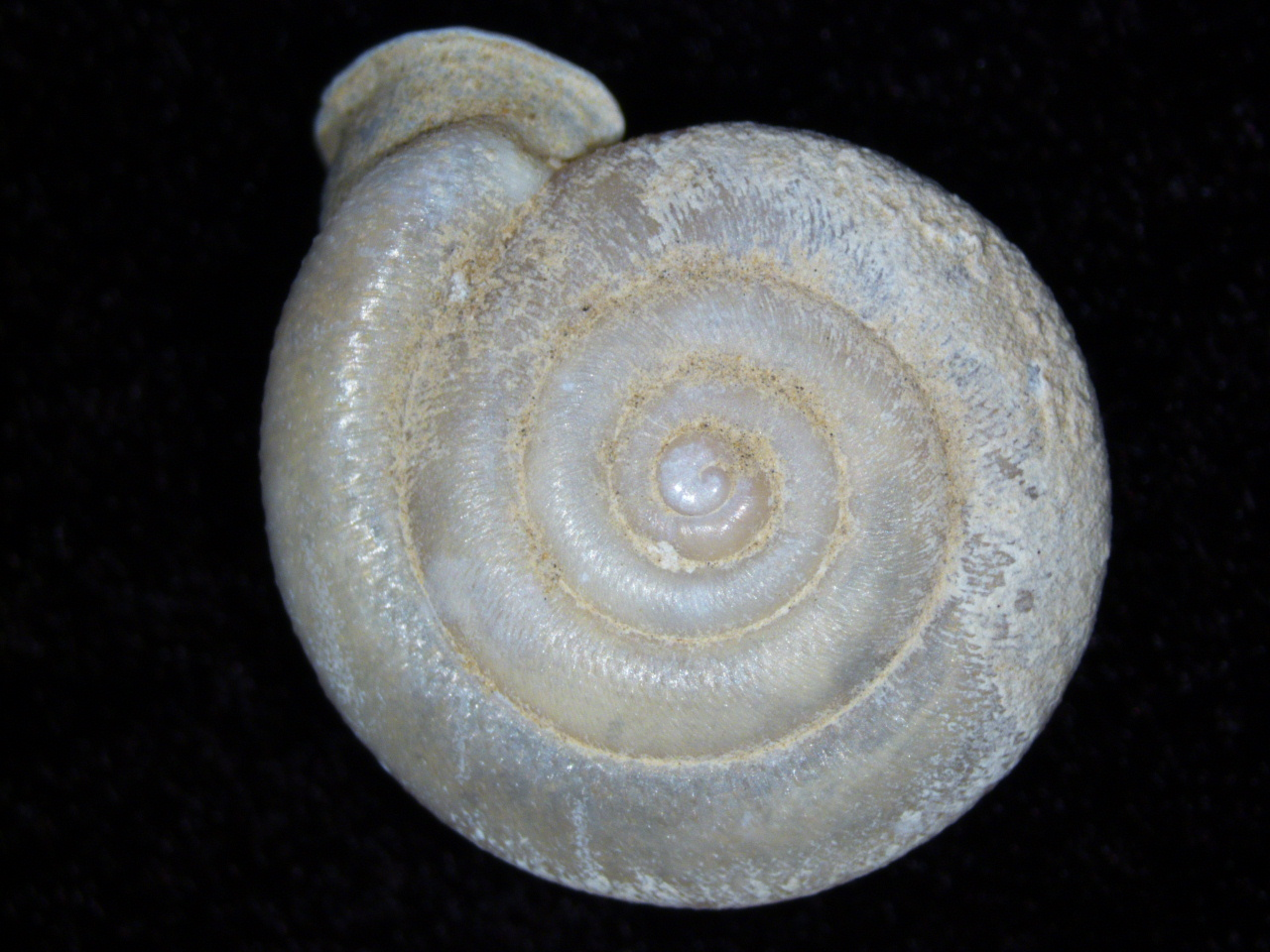
- Ashmunella pasonis shell - apical view

Conservation status
- Near Threatened (IUCN 2.3)

- Imperiled (NatureServe)

Scientific classification
- Kingdom: Animalia
- Phylum: Mollusca
- Class: Gastropoda
- Order: Stylommatophora
- Family: Polygyridae
- Genus: Ashmunella
- Species: A. pasonis

Binomial name
- Ashmunella pasonis (Drake, 1951)

= Franklin Mountain woodland snail =

Species of gastropod

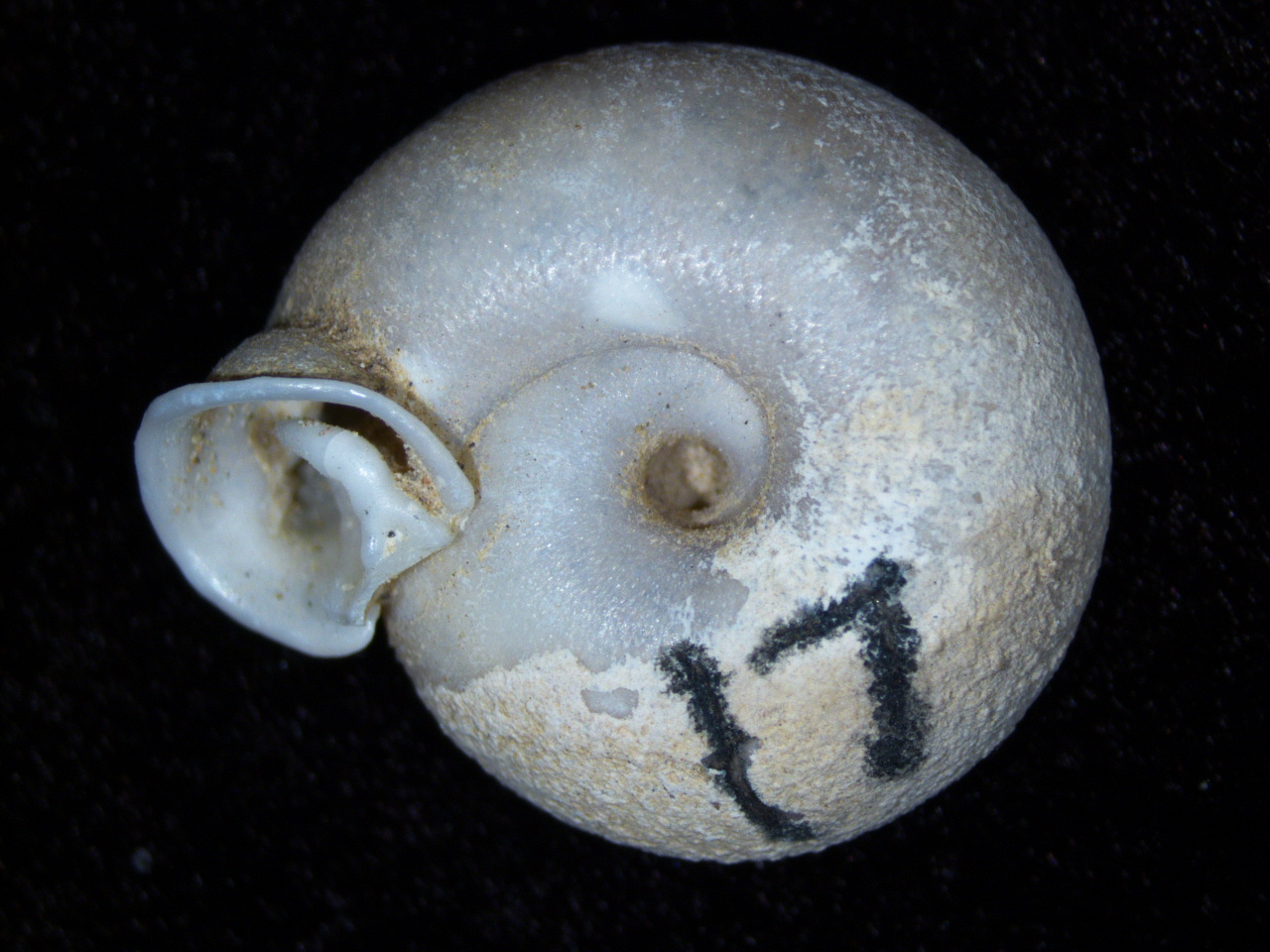
Asmunella pasonis shell - basal view

The Franklin Mountain woodland snail (Ashmunella pasonis) is a species of land snail in the family Polygyridae. It is native to New Mexico and Texas in the United States.

== Distribution and habitat ==
The snail has a limited range in two isolated mountain ranges, but it is a common species within this range. The snail lives in open rocky mountain habitat and is only found in accumulations of limestone talus.

== Reproduction ==
This species appears to have the capability of hybridizing with two other species: Ahmunella kochii sanandresensis and A. harrisi.
