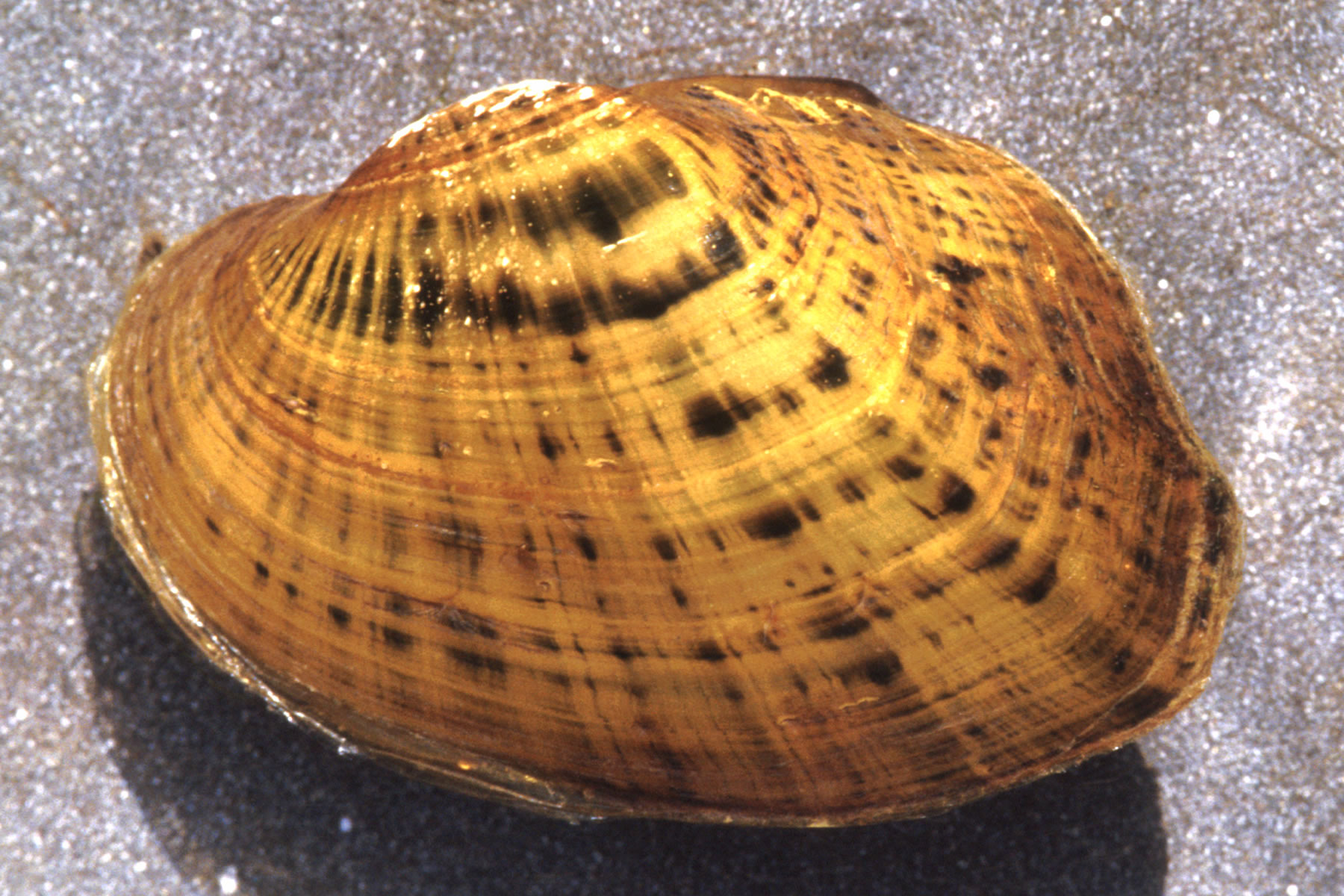

Conservation status
- Near Threatened (IUCN 2.3)

- Apparently Secure (NatureServe)

Scientific classification
- Kingdom: Animalia
- Phylum: Mollusca
- Class: Bivalvia
- Order: Unionida
- Family: Unionidae
- Genus: Ortmanniana
- Species: O. pectorosa

Binomial name
- Ortmanniana pectorosa (Conrad, 1834)

= Ortmanniana pectorosa =

Species of bivalve

Ortmanniana pectorosa, previously Actinonaias pectorosa, is a species of freshwater mussel, an aquatic bivalve mollusk in the family Unionidae, the river mussels. Its common name is the pheasantshell.

This species is endemic to the drainages of the Cumberland River and the Tennessee River in the United States.
