= Trochulus ataxiacus =

Scientific classification
- Domain: Eukaryota
- Kingdom: Animalia
- Phylum: Mollusca
- Class: Gastropoda
- Order: Stylommatophora
- Family: Hygromiidae
- Genus: Trochulus
- Species: T. ataxiacus

Binomial name
- Trochulus ataxiacus Fagot, 1884

Synonyms
- Trichia ataxiacus

Species of gastropod

Trochulus ataxiacus is a species of air-breathing land snail, a pulmonate gastropod mollusk in the family Hygromiidae, the hairy snails and their allies.
