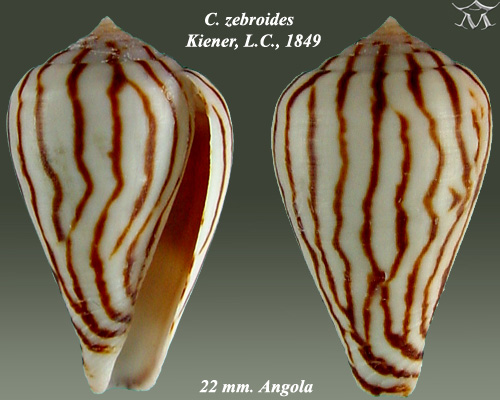
- Apertural and abapertural views of shell of Conus zebroides Kiener, L.C., 1849
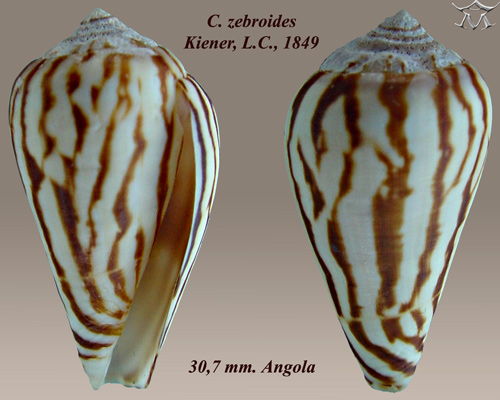

Conservation status
- Near Threatened (IUCN 3.1)

Scientific classification
- Kingdom: Animalia
- Phylum: Mollusca
- Class: Gastropoda
- Subclass: Caenogastropoda
- Order: Neogastropoda
- Superfamily: Conoidea
- Family: Conidae
- Genus: Conus
- Species: C. zebroides

Binomial name
- Conus zebroides Kiener, 1845

Synonyms
- Conus (Lautoconus) zebroides Kiener, 1848 · accepted, alternate representation; Conus angolensis Paes Da Franca, 1957; Varioconus zebroides Kiener, L.C., 1845

= Conus zebroides =

Species of sea snail

Conus zebroides, common name, the Quaga cone, is a species of predatory sea snail, a marine gastropod mollusk in the family Conidae, known as the cone snails, cone shells or cones.

== Description ==
The size of an adult shell varies between 18 mm and 51 mm. The shell is yellowish brown, longitudinally, irregularly striped with chestnut, extending over the spire.

== Distribution ==
This marine species is endemic to Angola.

== Gallery ==
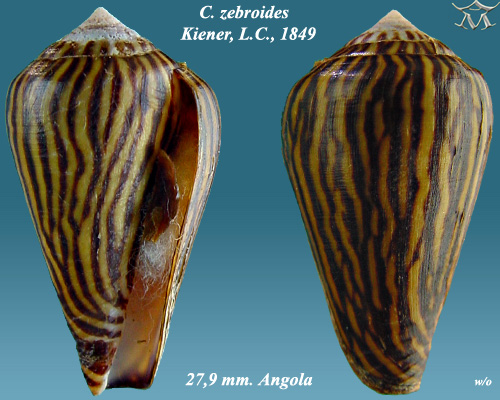
Conus zebroides Kiener, L.C., 1849

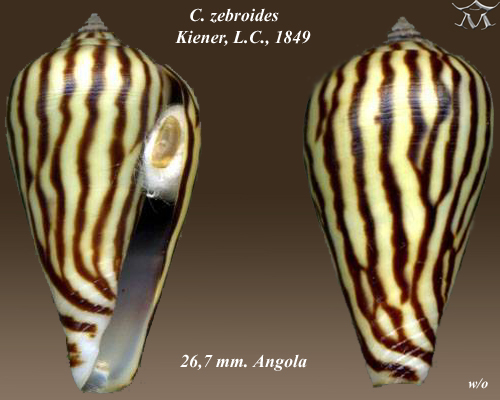
Conus zebroides Kiener, L.C., 1849

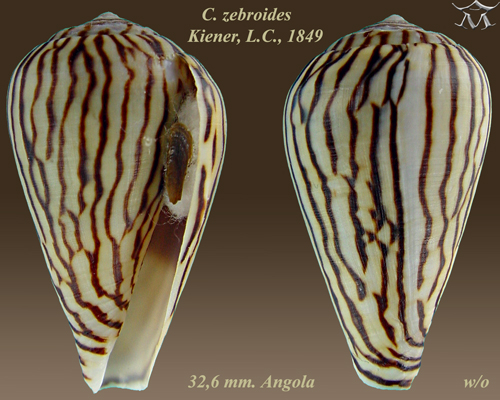
Conus zebroides Kiener, L.C., 1849
