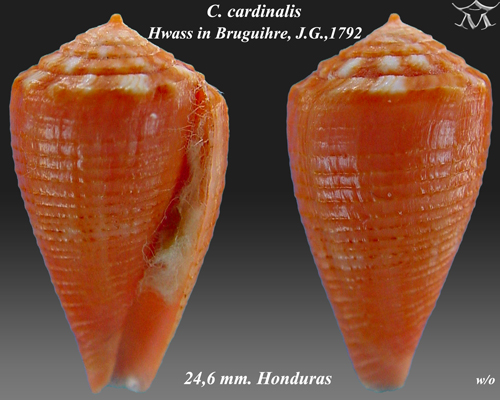
- Apertural and abapertural views of shell of Conus cardinalis Hwass in Bruguière, J.G., 1792
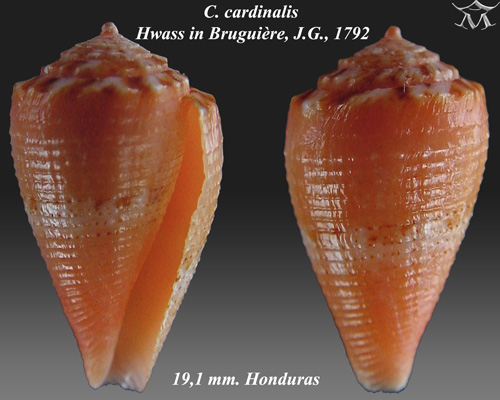

Conservation status
- Near Threatened (IUCN 3.1)

Scientific classification
- Kingdom: Animalia
- Phylum: Mollusca
- Class: Gastropoda
- Subclass: Caenogastropoda
- Order: Neogastropoda
- Superfamily: Conoidea
- Family: Conidae
- Genus: Conus
- Species: C. cardinalis

Binomial name
- Conus cardinalis Hwass in Bruguière, 1792

Synonyms
- Conus (Dauciconus) cardinalis Hwass in Bruguière, 1792 accepted, alternate representation; Conus exquisitus G. B. Sowerby III, 1887; Conus lubeckianus Bernardi, 1861; Conus mayaguensis Nowell-Usticke, 1968; Conus speciosus G. B. Sowerby II, 1857; Purpuriconus cardinalis (Hwass in Bruguière, 1792); Purpuriconus mayaguensis (Nowell-Usticke, 1968)

= Conus cardinalis =

Species of sea snail

Conus cardinalis, common name the cardinal cone, is a species of sea snail, a marine gastropod mollusk in the family Conidae, the cone snails and their allies.

Like all species within the genus Conus, these snails are predatory and venomous. They are capable of stinging humans, therefore live ones should be handled carefully or not at all.

== Distribution ==
This species occurs in the Caribbean Sea (Guadeloupe) and in the Gulf of Mexico.

== Description ==
The maximum recorded shell length is 32.2 mm.

== Habitat ==
Minimum recorded depth is 0 m. Maximum recorded depth is 21 m.
