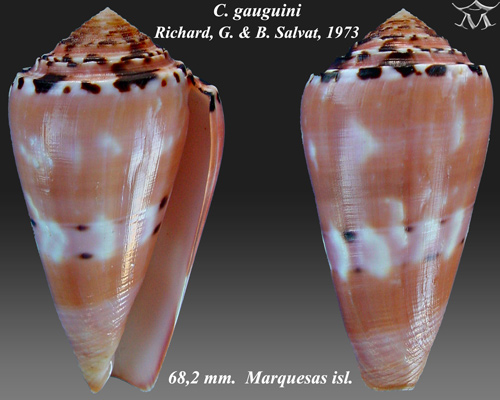
- Apertural and abapertural views of shell of Conus gauguini Richard, G. & B. Salvat, 1973
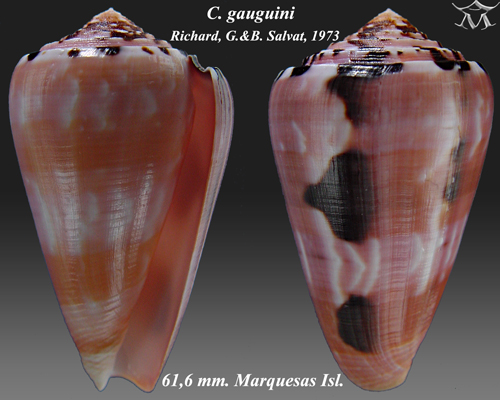

Conservation status
- Near Threatened (IUCN 3.1)

Scientific classification
- Kingdom: Animalia
- Phylum: Mollusca
- Class: Gastropoda
- Subclass: Caenogastropoda
- Order: Neogastropoda
- Superfamily: Conoidea
- Family: Conidae
- Genus: Conus
- Species: C. gauguini

Binomial name
- Conus gauguini Richard & Salvat, 1973

Synonyms
- Conus (Pionoconus) gauguini Richard & Salvat, 1973 · accepted, alternate representation; Pionoconus gauguini (Richard & Salvat, 1973)

= Conus gauguini =

Species of sea snail

Conus gauguini, common name Gauguin's cone, is a species of sea snail, a marine gastropod mollusk in the family Conidae, the cone snails and their allies.

Like all species within the genus Conus, these snails are predatory and venomous. They are capable of stinging humans, therefore live ones should be handled carefully or not at all.

== Description ==
The size of an adult shell varies between 56 mm and 93 mm.

== Distribution ==
This species occurs in the Pacific Ocean along the Marquesas and Tahiti.
