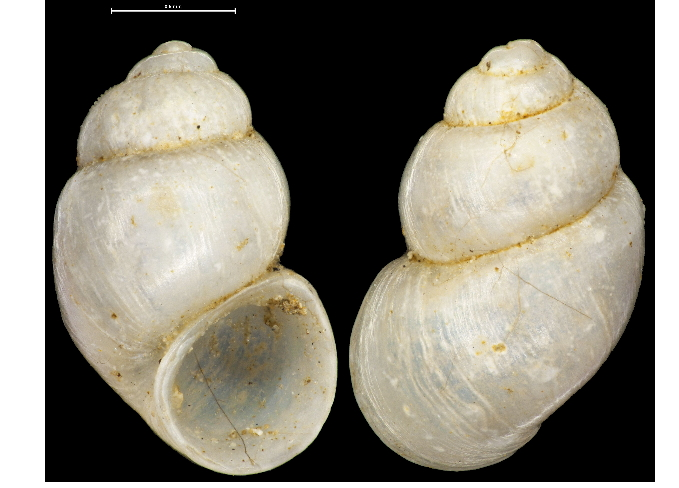
- Shell of Alzoniella hartwigschuetti (specimen at the Zoological Botanical Database of Biologiezentrum Linz Oberoesterreich)

Conservation status
- Near Threatened (IUCN 3.1)

Scientific classification
- Kingdom: Animalia
- Phylum: Mollusca
- Class: Gastropoda
- Subclass: Caenogastropoda
- Order: Littorinimorpha
- Family: Hydrobiidae
- Genus: Alzoniella
- Species: A. hartwigschuetti

Binomial name
- Alzoniella hartwigschuetti (Reischütz, 1983)

Synonyms
- Alzoniella (Alzoniella) hartwigschuetti (P. L. Reischütz, 1983) · alternative representation; Belgrandiella hartwigschuetti P. L. Reischütz, 1983 (original combination)

= Alzoniella hartwigschuetti =

Species of gastropod

Alzoniella hartwigschuetti is a species of spring snail, an aquatic gastropod in the family Hydrobiidae.

This species is endemic to Austria.
