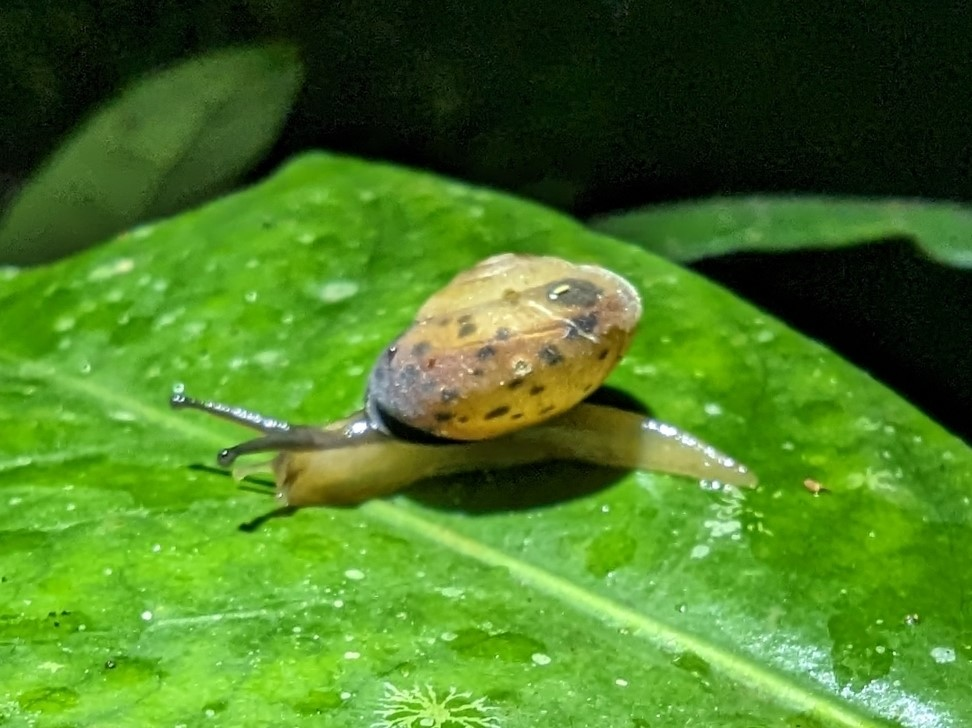

Conservation status
- Near Threatened (IUCN 2.3)

Scientific classification
- Kingdom: Animalia
- Phylum: Mollusca
- Class: Gastropoda
- Order: Stylommatophora
- Family: Camaenidae
- Genus: Forrestena; Stanisic, 2010
- Species: F. delicata

Binomial name
- Forrestena delicata (Hedley, 1912)

Synonyms
- (Species): Jacksonena delicata (Hedley, 1912); Planispira delicata Hedley, 1912

= Forrestena =

Mount Lewis keeled snail

Species and genus of gastropod

Forrestena is a genus of air-breathing land snails, terrestrial pulmonate gastropod molluscs in the family Camaenidae. It is monotypic, being represented by the single species Forrestena delicata, commonly known as the Mount Lewis keeled snail. The species is endemic to Australia.

The genus was first described in 2010 by J. Stanisic, while the species, Forrestana delicata, was first described in 1912 by C. Hedley as Planispira delicata, from a specimen collected from Bels0n's scrub, Atherton, Queensland.

The species is classified as "near threatened" by IUCN, due to loss of habitat.
