= Leiostyla calathiscus =

Conservation status
- Vulnerable (IUCN 2.3)

Scientific classification
- Kingdom: Animalia
- Phylum: Mollusca
- Class: Gastropoda
- Order: Stylommatophora
- Family: Lauriidae
- Genus: Leiostyla
- Species: L. calathiscus

Binomial name
- Leiostyla calathiscus (R.T. Lowe, 1831)

Species of gastropod

Leiostyla calathiscus is a species of small, air-breathing land snail, a terrestrial pulmonate gastropod mollusk in the family Lauriidae.

== Distribution ==
This species is endemic to Portugal.
