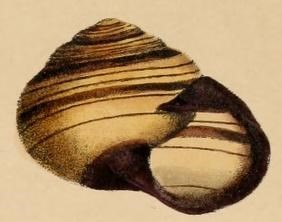

Scientific classification
- Kingdom: Animalia
- Phylum: Mollusca
- Class: Gastropoda
- Order: Stylommatophora
- Family: Camaenidae
- Genus: Marilynessa
- Species: M. yulei

Binomial name
- Marilynessa yulei (Forbes, 1852)

Synonyms
- Helix basalis Pilsbry, 1890; Helix rainbirdi Cox, 1870; Helix yulei Forbes, 1852

= Marilynessa yulei =

Species of gastropod

Marilynessa yulei is a species of snail in the family Camaenidae.

== Distribution ==
This species is endemic to Queensland, Australia.
