= Cristigibba wesselensis =

Conservation status
- Data Deficient (IUCN 2.3)

Scientific classification
- Kingdom: Animalia
- Phylum: Mollusca
- Class: Gastropoda
- Order: Stylommatophora
- Family: Camaenidae
- Genus: Cristigibba
- Species: C. wesselensis

Binomial name
- Cristigibba wesselensis Cox, 1868

Species of gastropod

Cristigibba wesselensis is a species of air-breathing land snail, a terrestrial pulmonate gastropod mollusk in the family Camaenidae. This species is endemic to Australia.
