= Austrochloritis pusilla =

Conservation status
- Near Threatened (IUCN 2.3)

Scientific classification
- Kingdom: Animalia
- Phylum: Mollusca
- Class: Gastropoda
- Order: Stylommatophora
- Family: Camaenidae
- Genus: Austrochloritis
- Species: A. pusilla

Binomial name
- Austrochloritis pusilla Hedley, 1912

Species of gastropod

Austrochloritis pusilla is a species of air-breathing land snail, a terrestrial pulmonate gastropod mollusk in the family Camaenidae. This species is endemic to Australia.
