= Meliobba shafferyi =

Conservation status
- Near Threatened (IUCN 2.3)

Scientific classification
- Kingdom: Animalia
- Phylum: Mollusca
- Class: Gastropoda
- Order: Stylommatophora
- Family: Camaenidae
- Genus: Meliobba
- Species: M. shafferyi

Binomial name
- Meliobba shafferyi Iredale, 1940

Species of gastropod

Meliobba shafferyi is a species of air-breathing land snails, terrestrial pulmonate gastropod mollusks in the family Camaenidae. This species is endemic to Australia.
