= Damochlora millepunctata =

Conservation status
- Endangered (IUCN 2.3)

Scientific classification
- Kingdom: Animalia
- Phylum: Mollusca
- Class: Gastropoda
- Order: Stylommatophora
- Family: Camaenidae
- Genus: Damochlora
- Species: D. millepunctata

Binomial name
- Damochlora millepunctata Smith, 1894

Species of gastropod

Damochlora millepunctata is a species of air-breathing land snails, terrestrial pulmonate gastropod mollusks. This species is endemic to Australia.
