= Youwanjela wilsoni =

Conservation status
- Vulnerable (IUCN 2.3)

Scientific classification
- Kingdom: Animalia
- Phylum: Mollusca
- Class: Gastropoda
- Order: Stylommatophora
- Family: Camaenidae
- Genus: Youwanjela
- Species: Y. wilsoni

Binomial name
- Youwanjela wilsoni (Solem, 1979)

Synonyms
- Hadra wilsoni Solem, 1979 (original combination)

Species of gastropod

Youwanjela wilsoni is a species of air-breathing land snail, terrestrial pulmonate gastropod mollusks in the family Camaenidae.

== Distribution ==
This species is endemic to Western Australia.
