= Mussonena campbelli =

Conservation status
- Vulnerable (IUCN 2.3)

Scientific classification
- Kingdom: Animalia
- Phylum: Mollusca
- Class: Gastropoda
- Order: Stylommatophora
- Family: Camaenidae
- Genus: Mussonena
- Species: M. campbelli

Binomial name
- Mussonena campbelli Iredale, 1937

Species of gastropod

Mussonena campbelli is a species of air-breathing land snail, a terrestrial pulmonate gastropod mollusk in the family Camaenidae, endemic to Australia.
