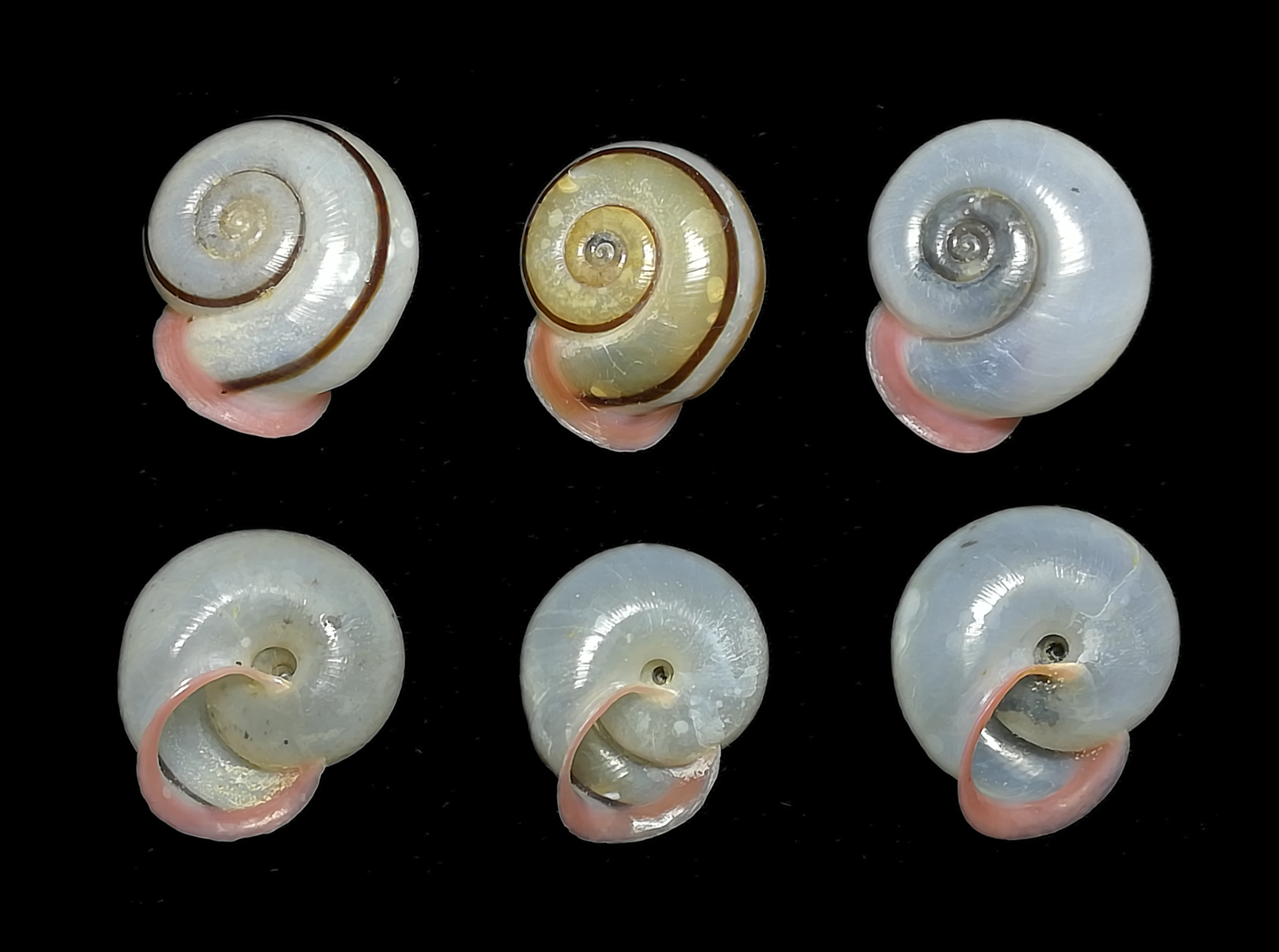

Scientific classification
- Domain: Eukaryota
- Kingdom: Animalia
- Phylum: Mollusca
- Class: Gastropoda
- Order: Stylommatophora
- Family: Camaenidae
- Genus: Planispira
- Species: P. deaniana

Binomial name
- Planispira deaniana (Ford, 1890)

= Planispira deaniana =

Species of gastropod

Planispira deaniana is a species of discoid air-breathing land snail, a gastropod mollusc in the family Camaenidae.

== Morphology ==
The shell of this species is oblate, with red outer lip and light brown periostracum. Some individuals have 1~2 black or brown annular bands.

== Distribution ==
Western and Gulf Province, Papua New Guinea.
