= Vidumelon wattii =

Conservation status
- Vulnerable (IUCN 2.3)

Scientific classification
- Kingdom: Animalia
- Phylum: Mollusca
- Class: Gastropoda
- Order: Stylommatophora
- Family: Camaenidae
- Genus: Vidumelon
- Species: V. wattii

Binomial name
- Vidumelon wattii Tate, 1894

Species of gastropod

Vidumelon wattii is a species of land snail in the family Camaenidae. It is known commonly as Watt's land snail. It is endemic to Australia, where it is limited to a range no more than 10 kilometers wide located near Alice Springs.

This snail has a tightly coiled shell approximately one centimeter wide. It lives in leaf litter and probably consumes dead plant matter.
