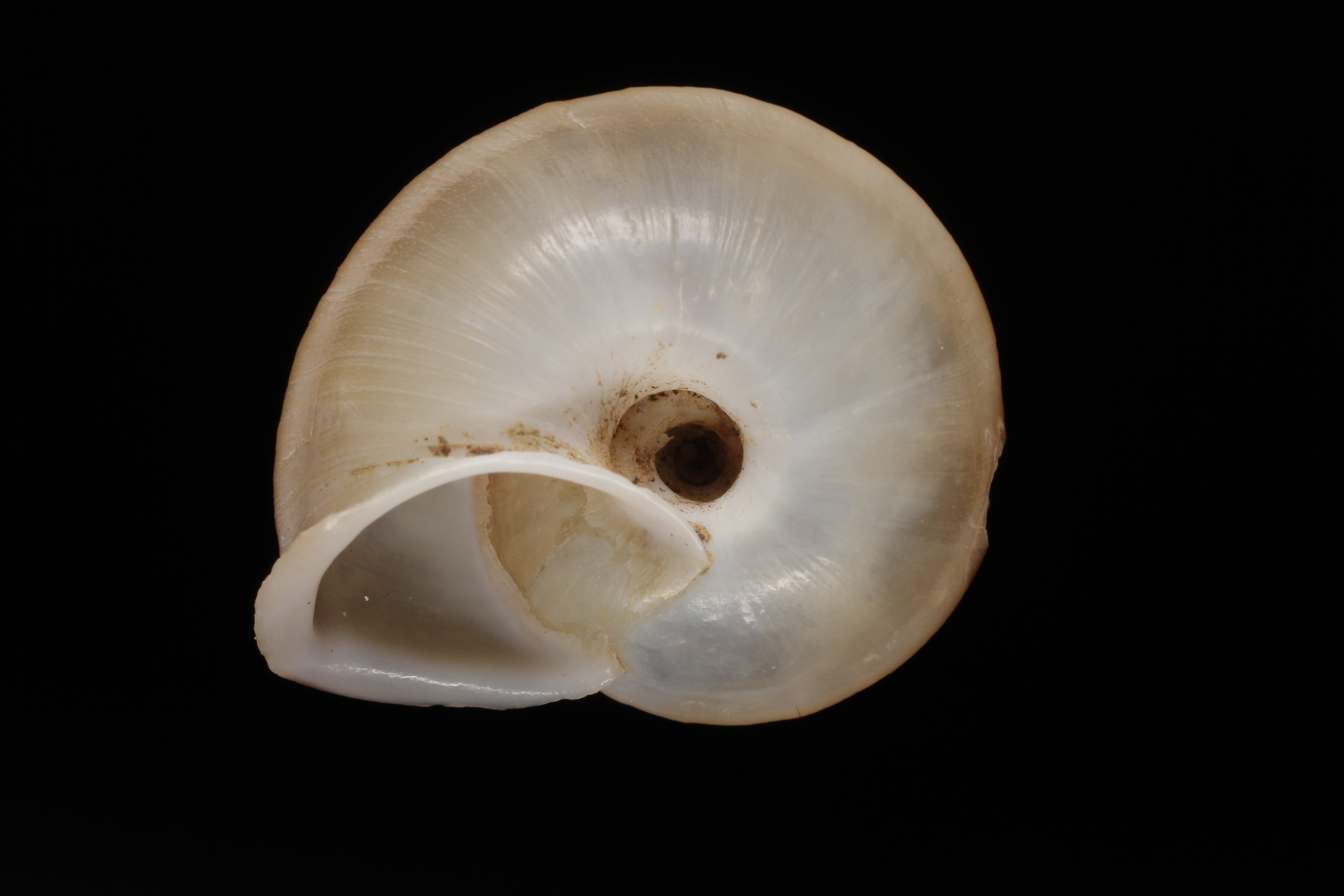
- Shell of Bouchetcamaena thachorum (holotype at MNHN, Paris)

Scientific classification
- Domain: Eukaryota
- Kingdom: Animalia
- Phylum: Mollusca
- Class: Gastropoda
- Order: Stylommatophora
- Family: Camaenidae
- Subfamily: Camaeninae
- Genus: Bouchetcamaena; Thach, 2018

Type species
- Bouchetcamaena huberi Thach, 2018

= Bouchetcamaena =

Genus of gastropods

Bouchetcamaena is a genus of air-breathing land snails, terrestrial pulmonate gastropod mollusks in the family Camaenidae.

This is an alternate representation and debated synonym of Trichochloritis Pilsbry, 1891

== Species ==
- Bouchetcamaena herosae Thach & F. Huber, 2020
- Bouchetcamaena maestrati Thach & F. Huber, 2020
- Bouchetcamaena thachi F. Huber, 2018
- Bouchetcamaena thachorum Thach, 2020

Synonyms

- Bouchetcamaena fouresi (Morlet, 1886) represented as Trichochloritis fouresi (Morlet, 1886)
- Bouchetcamaena huberi Thach, 2018 represented as Trichochloritis fouresi (Morlet, 1886) (debated synonym)
- Bouchetcamaena caseus (L. Pfeiffer, 1860): synonym of Chloritis caseus (L. Pfeiffer, 1860)
- Bouchetcamaena condoriana (Crosse & P. Fischer, 1863): synonym of Bellatrachia condoriana (Crosse & P. Fischer, 1863)
- Bouchetcamaena nasuta (Bavay & Dautzenberg, 1909): synonym of Chloritis nasuta (Bavay & Dautzenberg, 1909)
- Bouchetcamaena thachi F. Huber, 2020: synonym of Bouchetcamaena thachorum Thach, 2020 (invalid: junior homonym of Bouchetcamaena thachi F. Huber, 2018; B. thachorum is a replacement name)
