= Austrochloritis ascensa =

Conservation status
- Near Threatened (IUCN 2.3)

Scientific classification
- Kingdom: Animalia
- Phylum: Mollusca
- Class: Gastropoda
- Order: Stylommatophora
- Family: Camaenidae
- Genus: Austrochloritis
- Species: A. ascensa

Binomial name
- Austrochloritis ascensa Iredale, 1943

Species of gastropod

Austrochloritis ascensa is a species of gastropod in the family Camaenidae. It is endemic to Australia.
