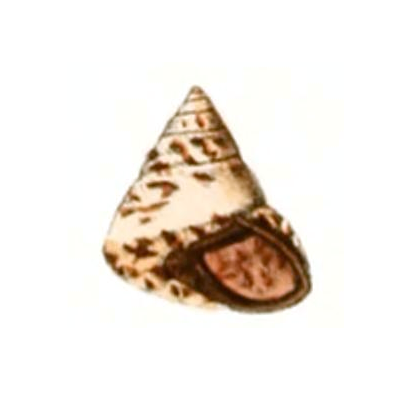

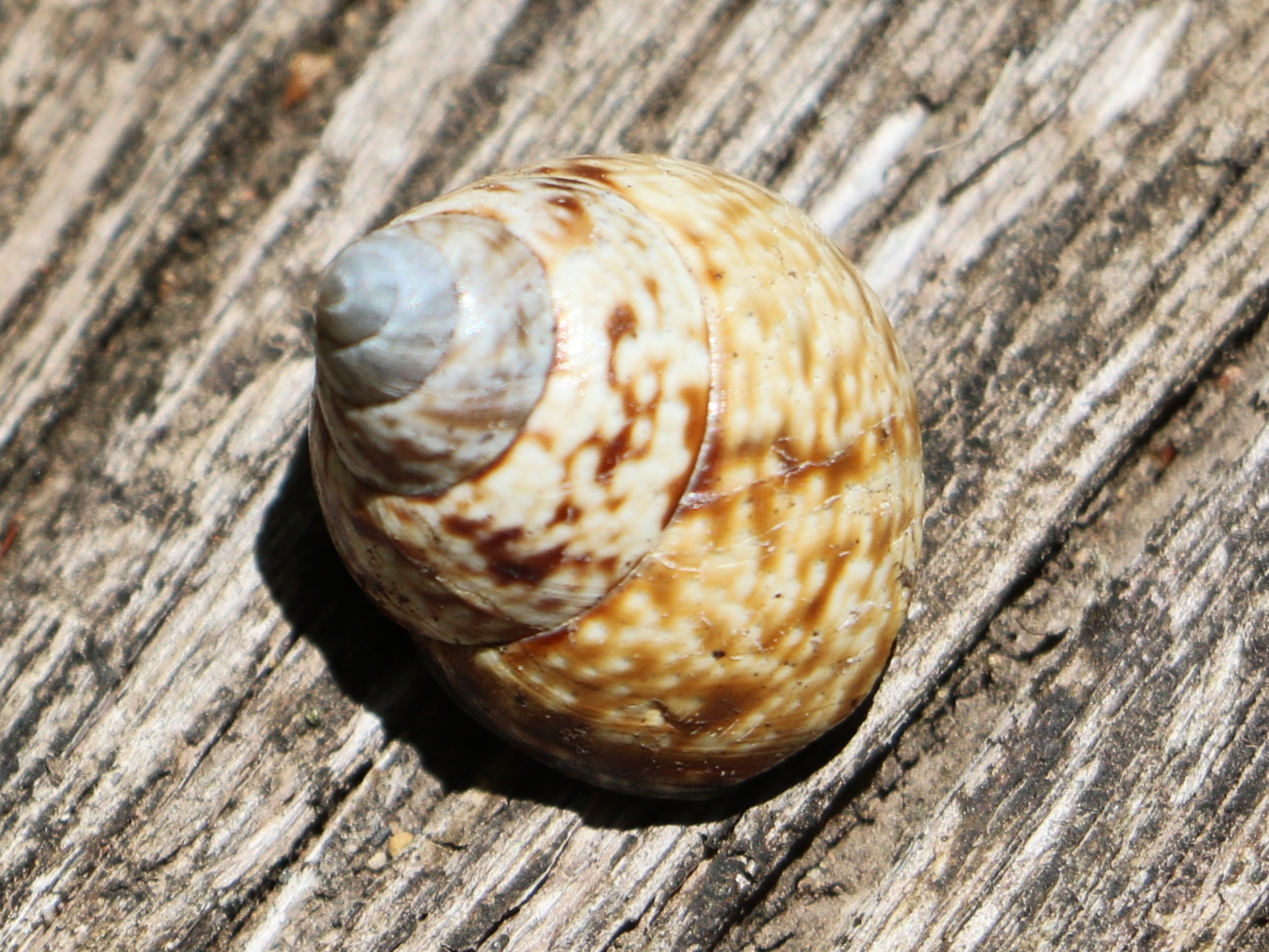

Conservation status
- Near Threatened (IUCN 2.3)

Scientific classification
- Kingdom: Animalia
- Phylum: Mollusca
- Class: Gastropoda
- Order: Stylommatophora
- Family: Camaenidae
- Genus: Papuexul
- Species: P. bidwilli

Binomial name
- Papuexul bidwilli Reeve, 1853

= Papuexul bidwilli =

mottled tree snail

Species of gastropod

Papuexul bidwilli is a species of air-breathing land snail, a terrestrial pulmonate gastropod mollusk in the family Camaenidae. The habitat is up in the rainforest canopy, sometimes on epiphytes. A rare rainforest snail with a very patchy distribution that goes from Maryborough, southeast Queensland to Forster, New South Wales.
