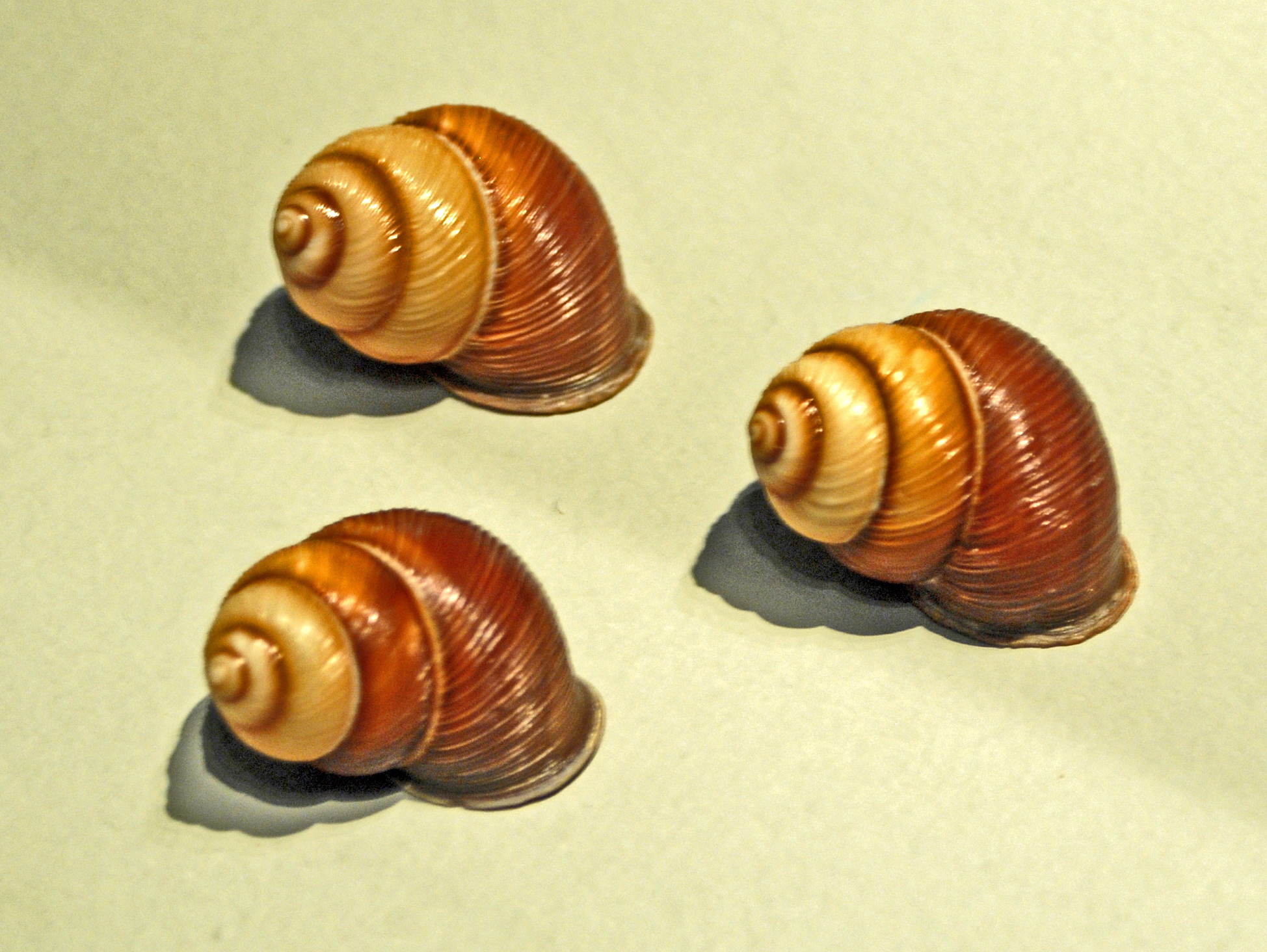
- Shells of Phoenicobius aratus on display at the Museo Civico di Storia Naturale di Milano

Scientific classification
- Kingdom: Animalia
- Phylum: Mollusca
- Class: Gastropoda
- Order: Stylommatophora
- Family: Camaenidae
- Genus: Phoenicobius
- Species: P. aratus

Binomial name
- Phoenicobius aratus Sowerby, 1841

= Phoenicobius aratus =

Species of gastropod

Phoenicobius aratus is a species of medium-sized, air-breathing land snail, a terrestrial pulmonate gastropod mollusk in the family Camaenidae.

This species can be found in the Philippines. Shells can reach a length of about 45 millimetres (1.8 in).
