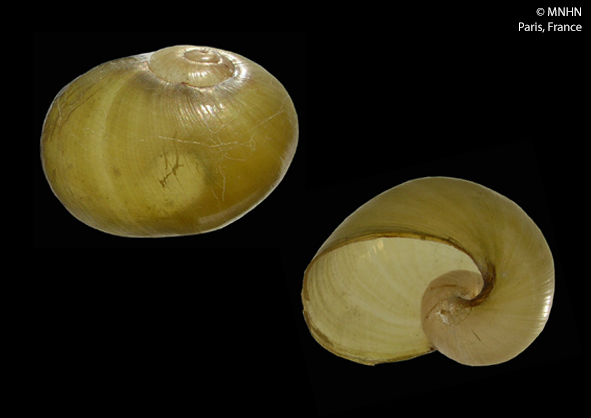
- Shell of Cryptaegis pilsbryi (specimen at MNHN, Paris)

Scientific classification
- Domain: Eukaryota
- Kingdom: Animalia
- Phylum: Mollusca
- Class: Gastropoda
- Order: Stylommatophora
- Family: Camaenidae
- Genus: Cryptaegis; Clapp, 1923

Type species
- Cryptaegis pilsbryi Clapp, 1923

= Cryptaegis =

Genus of gastropods

Cryptaegis is a genus of air-breathing land snails, terrestrial pulmonate gastropod mollusks in the family Camaenidae.

== Species ==
Species within the genus Cryptaegis include:

- Cryptaegis pilsbryi Clapp, 1923
