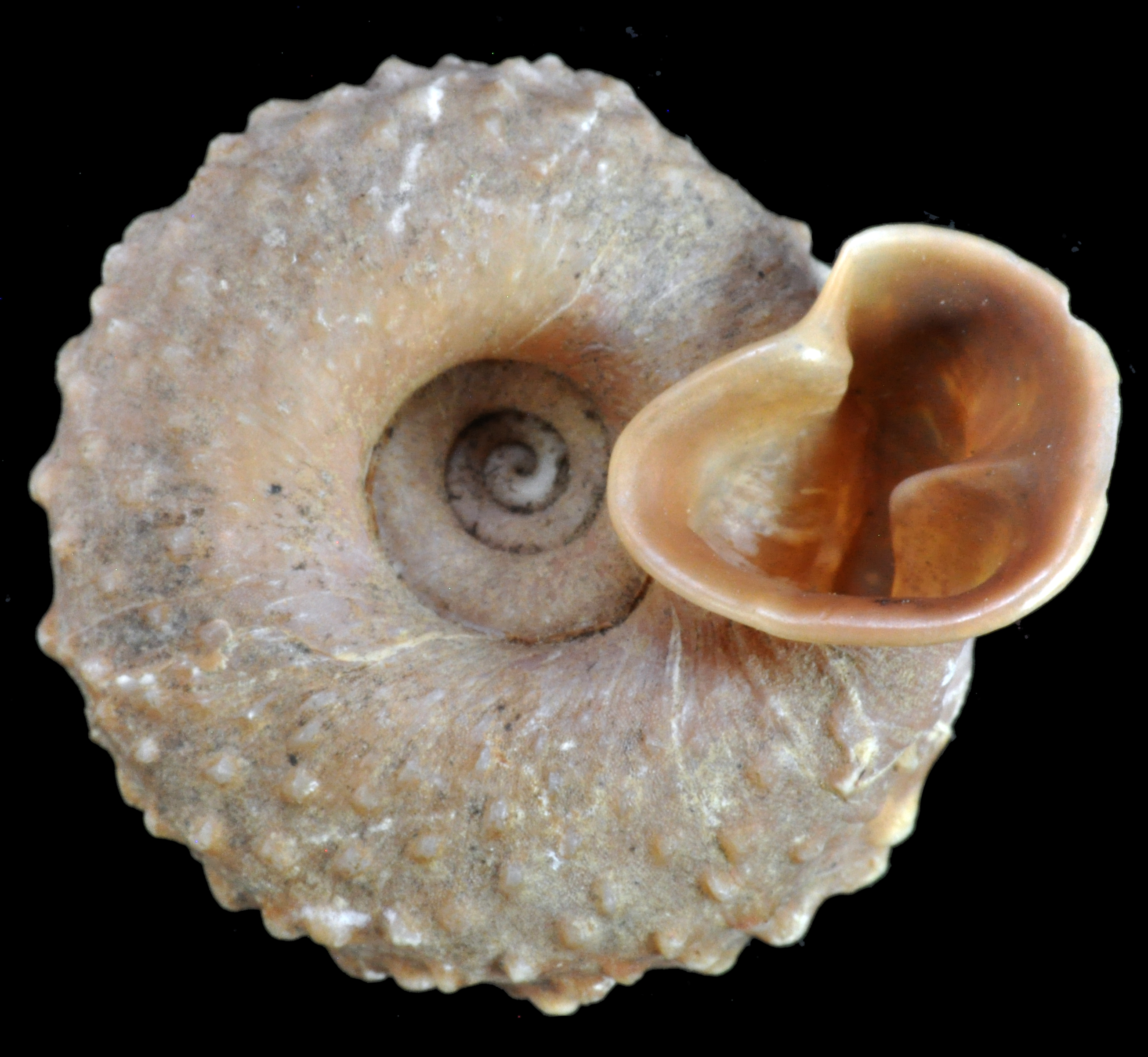
- Shell of Moellendorffia depressispira (syntype at MNHN, Paris)

Scientific classification
- Kingdom: Animalia
- Phylum: Mollusca
- Class: Gastropoda
- Order: Stylommatophora
- Superfamily: Helicoidea
- Family: Camaenidae
- Subfamily: Camaeninae
- Genus: Moellendorffia; Ancey, 1887

Type species
- Helix trisinuata Martens, 1867

Synonyms
- Helix (Moellendorffia) Ancey, 1887; Moellendorffia (Moellendorffia) Ancey, 1887· accepted, alternate representation; Proctostoma Mabille, 1887

= Moellendorffia =

Genus of gastropods

Moellendorffia is a gastropod mollusc genus of the family Camaenidae. Members of this genus appear only in East Asia, spanning north from Japan, mainland China, Hong Kong, Vietnam and Indonesia.

== Species ==
Documented species belonging to Moellendorffia are listed below:

- Moellendorffia blaisei Dautzenberg & Fischer, 1905
- Moellendorffia dengi H.-F. Yang, Z.-Y. Fan, D.-D. Qiao & J. He, 2012
- Moellendorffia depressispira (Bavay & Dautzenberg, 1909)
- Moellendorffia diminuta
- Moellendorffia eastlakeana (Möllendorff, 1882)
- Moellendorffia hensaniensis (Gredler, 1885)
- Moellendorffia loxotata (Mabille, 1887)
- Moellendorffia messageri (Bavay & Dautzenberg, 1899)
- Moellendorffia sculptilis (Moellendorff, 1884)
- Moellendorffia spurca (Bavay & Dautzenberg, 1899)
- Moellendorffia tokunoensis
- Moellendorffia trisinuata (Martens, 1867)
  - Moellendorffia trisinuata sculptilis (Moellendorff, 1881)
  - Moellendorffia trisinuata trisinuata (Moellendorff, 1867)

Taxon inquirendum

- † Moellendorffia polygyrella Yü, 1982

Species brought into synonymy

- Moellendorffia callitrichia (Bavay & Dautzenberg, 1899): synonym of Moellendorffia eastlakeana (Möllendorff, 1882) (junior synonym)
- Moellendorffia erdmanni (Schmacker & O. Boettger, 1894): synonym of Moellendorffiella erdmanni (Schmacker & O. Boettger, 1894) (unaccepted combination)
- Moellendorffia eucharistus (Pilsbry, 1905): synonym of Trichelix eucharistus (Pilsbry, 1901): synonym of Trichelix eucharista (Pilsbry, 1901)
- Moellendorffia faberiana (Möllendorff, 1888): synonym of Moellendorffiella faberiana (Möllendorff, 1888) (superseded combination)
- Moellendorffia hiraseana Pilsbry, 1905: synonym of Trichelix hiraseana (Pilsbry, 1905) (original combination)
- Moellendorffia horrida (L. Pfeiffer, 1863): synonym of Trichelix horrida (L. Pfeiffer, 1863) (unaccepted combination)
