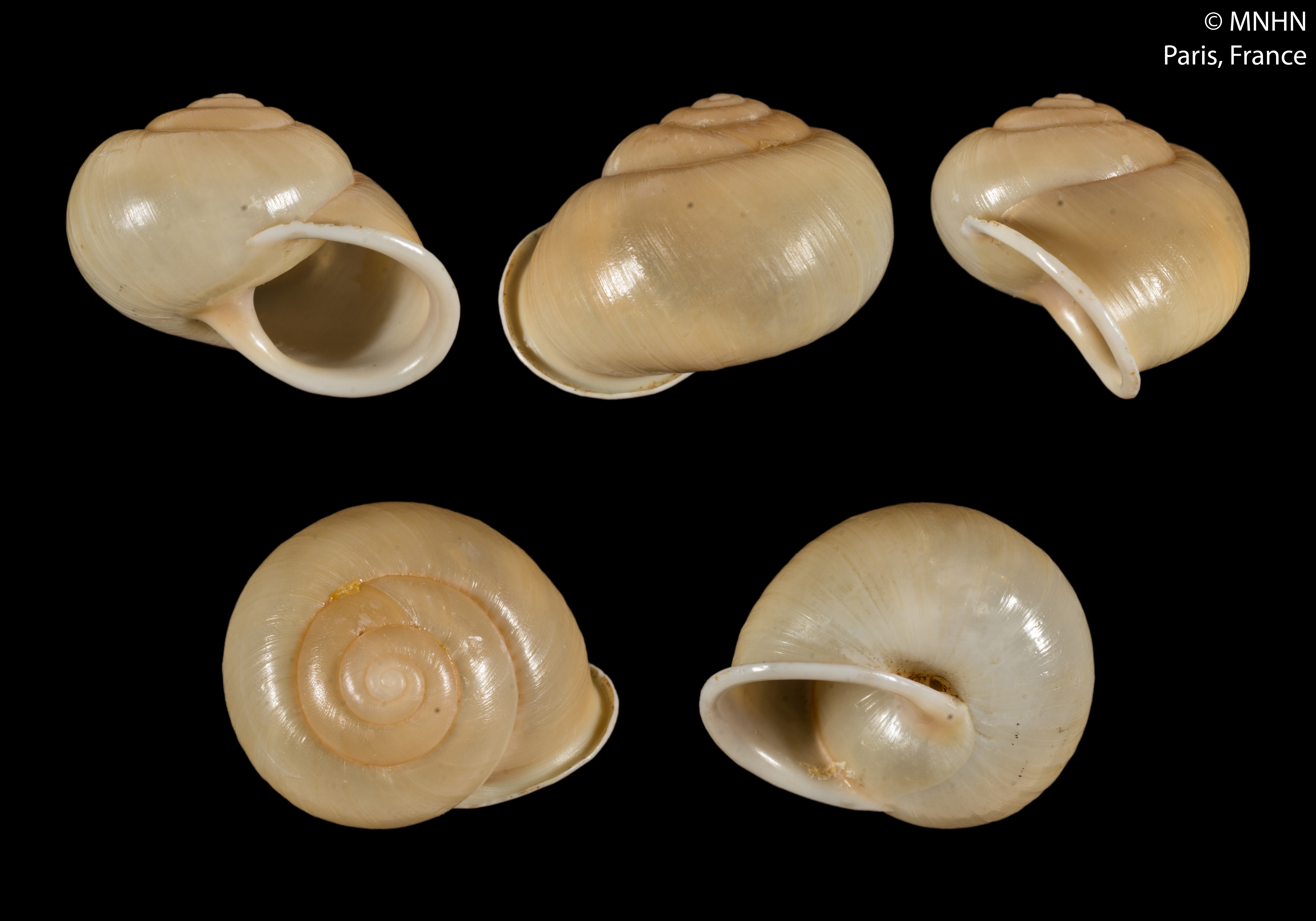
- Shell of Parachloritis argilacea (syntype at MNHN, Paris)

Scientific classification
- Domain: Eukaryota
- Kingdom: Animalia
- Phylum: Mollusca
- Class: Gastropoda
- Order: Stylommatophora
- Superfamily: Helicoidea
- Family: Camaenidae
- Subfamily: Hadrinae
- Genus: Parachloritis; Ehrmann, 1912

Type species
- Eulota (Plecteulota) telitecta Möllendorff, 1892

= Parachloritis =

Genus of gastropods

Parachloritis is a genus of air-breathing land snails, terrestrial pulmonate gastropod mollusks in the subfamily Hadrinae of the family Camaenidae.

== Species ==
- Parachloritis afranio Köhler & Kessner, 2014
- Parachloritis argilacea (Férussac, 1821)
- Parachloritis atauroensis Köhler & Kessner, 2014
- Parachloritis baucauensis Köhler & Kessner, 2014
- Parachloritis herculea Köhler & Kessner, 2014
- Parachloritis laritame Köhler & Kessner, 2014
- Parachloritis malukuensis Köhler & Kessner, 2014
- Parachloritis manuelmendesi Köhler & Kessner, 2014
- Parachloritis mariae (Nobre, 1917)
- Parachloritis mendax (Martens, 1864)
- Parachloritis mundiperdidi Köhler & Kessner, 2014
- Parachloritis newtoni (Nobre, 1917)
- Parachloritis ninokonisi Köhler & Kessner, 2014
- Parachloritis nusatenggarae Köhler & Kessner, 2014
- Parachloritis pseudolandouria Köhler & Kessner, 2014
- Parachloritis ramelau Köhler & Kessner, 2014
- Parachloritis reidi Köhler & Kessner, 2014
- Parachloritis renschi Köhler & Kessner, 2014
- Parachloritis sylvatica Köhler & Kessner, 2014
- Parachloritis telitecta (Möllendorff, 1892)
