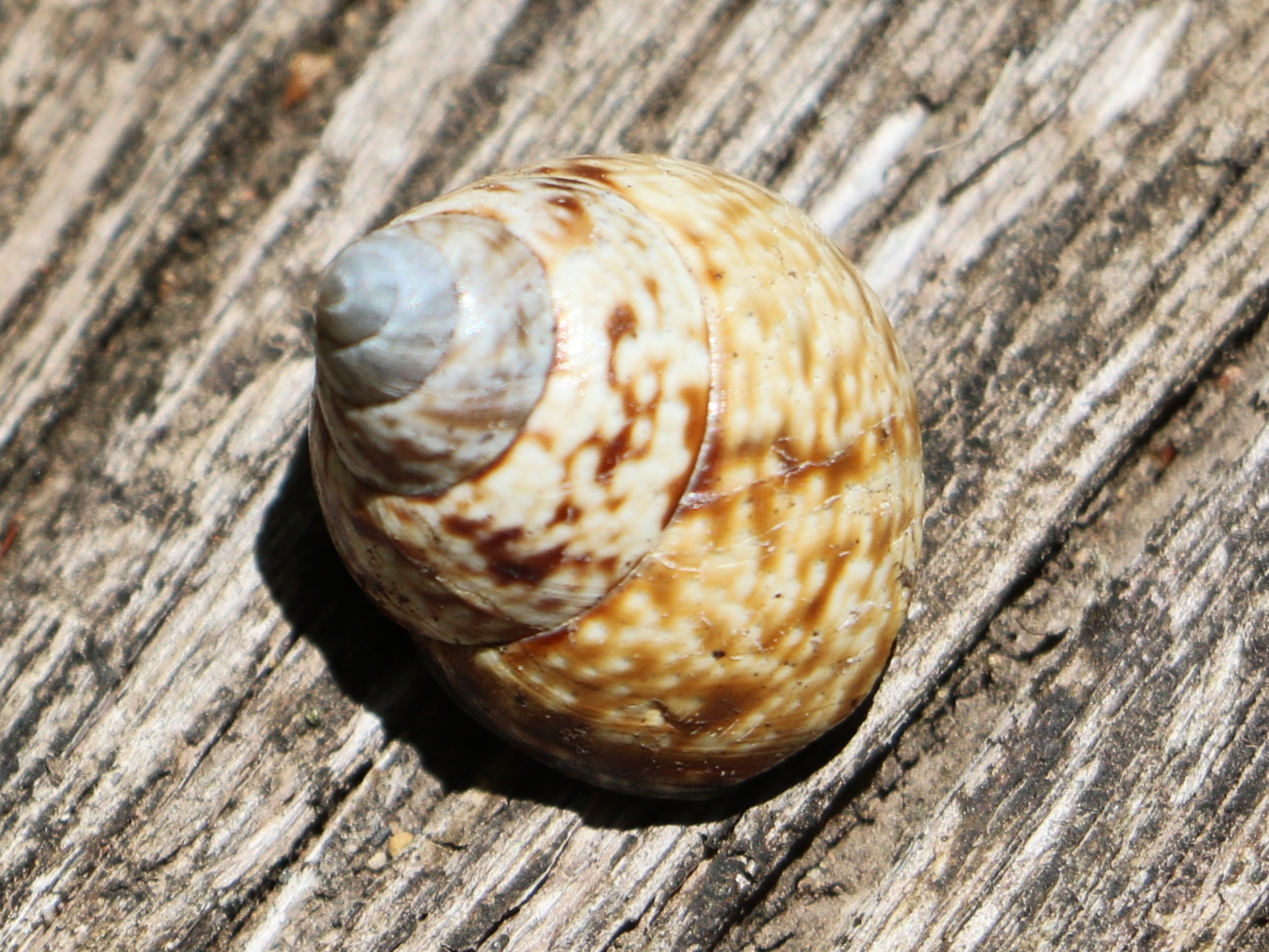
- Papuexul bidwilli

Scientific classification
- Kingdom: Animalia
- Phylum: Mollusca
- Class: Gastropoda
- Order: Stylommatophora
- Family: Camaenidae
- Genus: Papuexul; Iredale, 1933

= Papuexul =

Genus of gastropods

Papuexul is a genus of air-breathing land snails, terrestrial pulmonate gastropod mollusks in the family Camaenidae.

== Species ==
Species within the genus Papuexul include:

- Papuexul bidwilli Reeve, 1853
