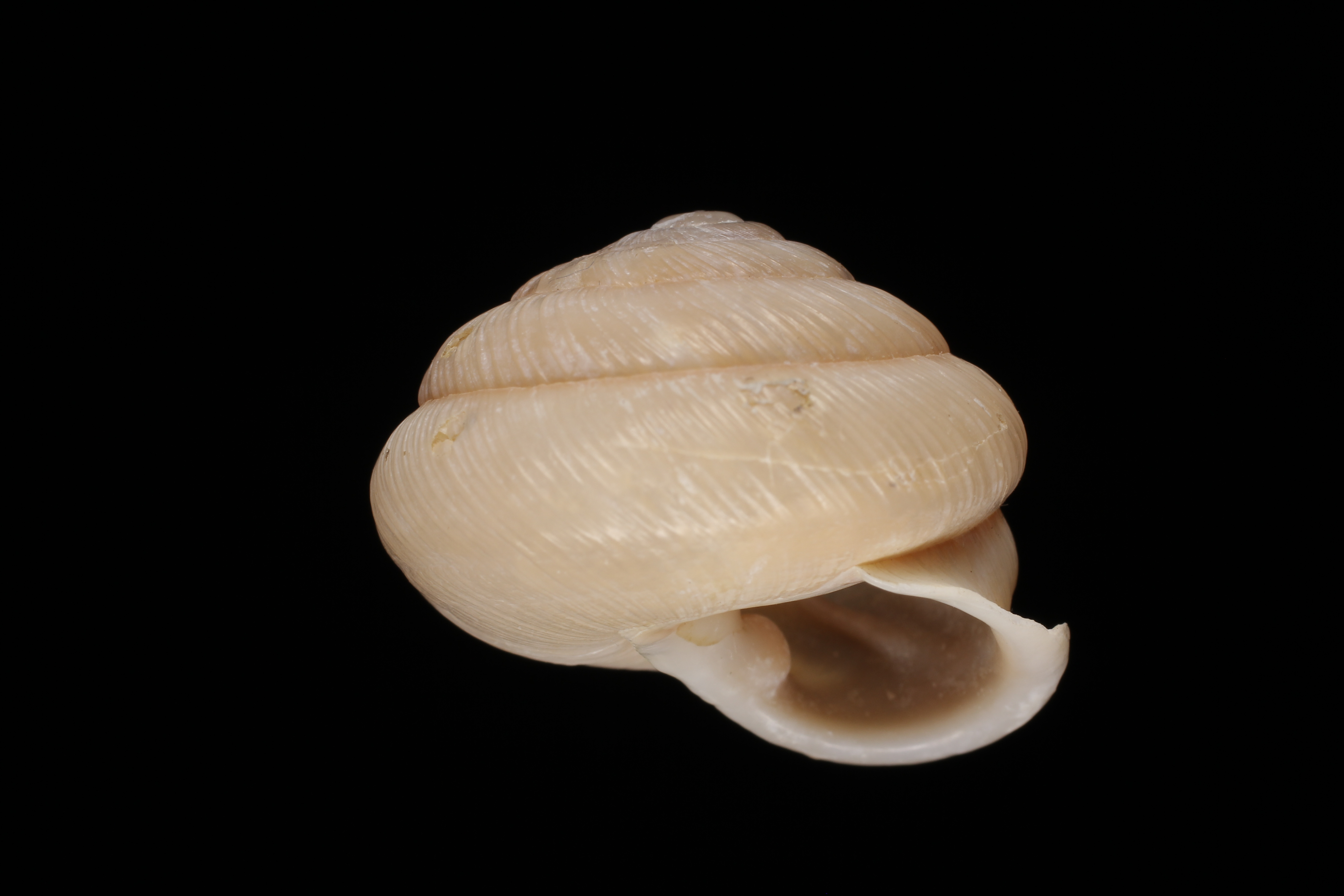
- Shell of Neocepolis merarcha franzhuberi (holotype at MNHN, Paris)

Scientific classification
- Kingdom: Animalia
- Phylum: Mollusca
- Class: Gastropoda
- Order: Stylommatophora
- Family: Camaenidae
- Subfamily: Camaeninae
- Genus: Neocepolis; Pilsbry, 1891

Type species
- Helix merarcha Mabille, 1888

= Neocepolis =

Genus of gastropods

Neocepolis is a genus of air-breathing land snails, terrestrial pulmonate gastropod mollusks in the subfamily Camaeninae of the family Camaenidae.

== Species ==
- Neocepolis merarcha (Mabille, 1888)
- Neocepolis morleti (Dautzenberg & d'Hamonville, 1887)

Species brought into synonymy

- Neocepolis cherrieri (Bavay, 1908): synonym of Neocepolis merarcha (Mabille, 1888) (unnecessary replacement name for H. langsonensis Bavay & Dautzenberg, 1899)
