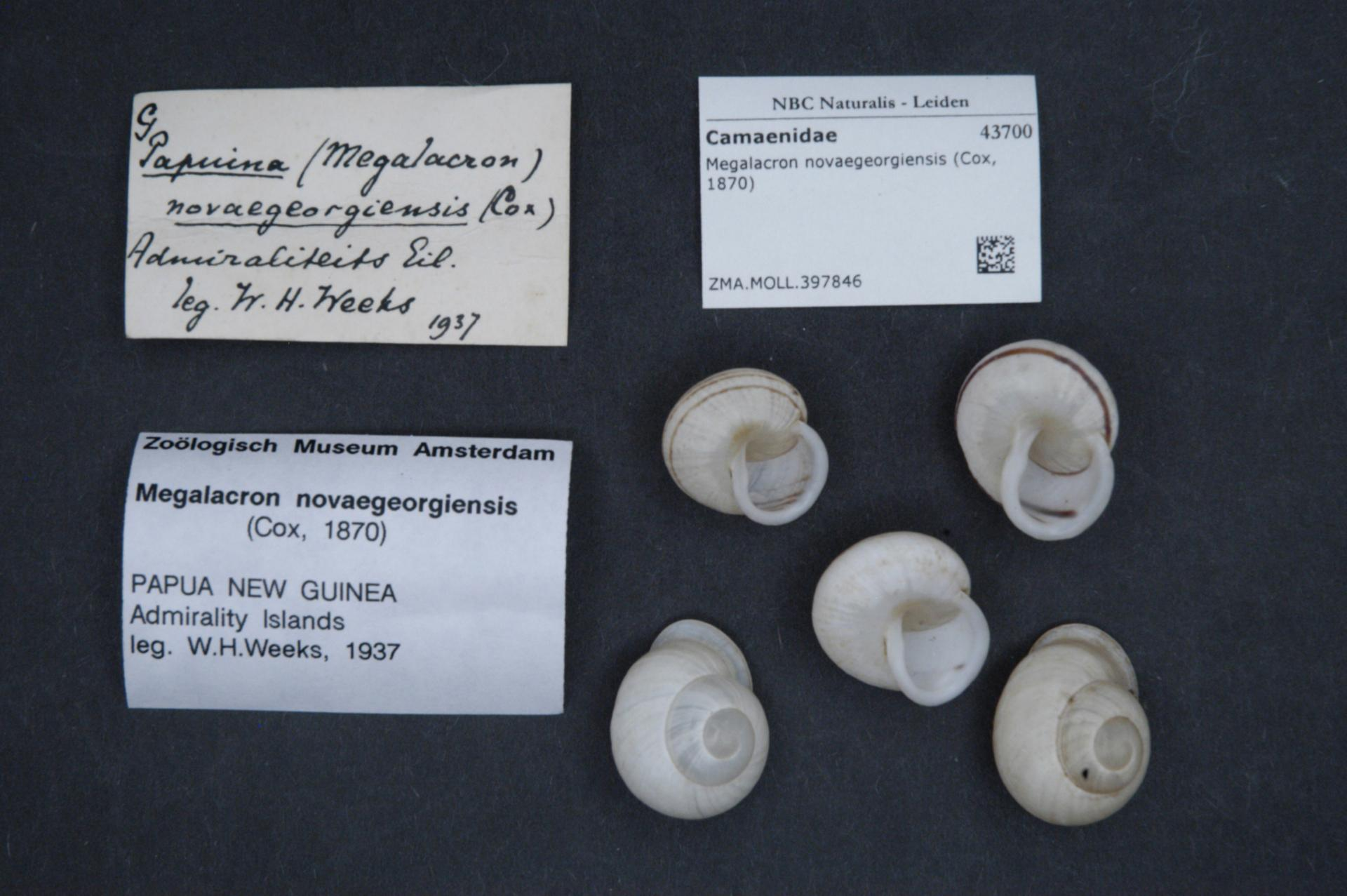
- Shell of Megalacron novaegeorgiensis (specimen at Naturalis Biodiversity Center)

Scientific classification
- Domain: Eukaryota
- Kingdom: Animalia
- Phylum: Mollusca
- Class: Gastropoda
- Order: Stylommatophora
- Superfamily: Helicoidea
- Family: Camaenidae
- Subfamily: Hadrinae
- Genus: Megalacron; I. Rensch, 1934

Type species
- Helix novaegeorgiensis Cox, 1870

Synonyms
- Emiralena Iredale, 1941 (junior synonym); Glomerata I. Rensch, 1934 (junior synonym); Helix (Pileolus) Lesson, 1831 (Invalid: junior homonym of Pileolus G.B. Sowerby I, 1823); Lisprelia Iredale, 1941 (objective junior synonym); Lullicola Iredale, 1941; Papuina (Glomerata) I. Rensch, 1934 (junior synonym); Papuina (Megalacron) I. Rensch, 1934 (original rank); Papuina (Pinnadena) Iredale, 1941; Pinnadena Iredale, 1941 (junior synonym); Solmopina Iredale, 1941 (junior synonym)

= Megalacron =

Genus of gastropods

Megalacron is a genus of air-breathing land snails, terrestrial pulmonate gastropod mollusks in the subfamily Hadrinae of the family Camaenidae.

== Species ==
Species within the genus Megalacron include:

- Megalacron admiralitatis (I. Rensch, 1931)
- Megalacron alfredi (Cox, 1871)
- Megalacron ambrosia (Angas, 1868)
- Megalacron bequaerti Clench & Turner, 1964
- Megalacron boivini (Petit de la Saussaye, 1841)
- Megalacron boyerii (P. Fischer & Bernardi, 1857)
- Megalacron coniformis (Férussac, 1821)
- Megalacron coxiana (Angas, 1868)
- Megalacron densestriata (Fulton, 1902)
- Megalacron isabellae (Jaeckel & Schlesch, 1952)
- Megalacron juttingae Clench & Turner, 1964
- Megalacron klaarwateri (I. Rensch, 1931)
- Megalacron lambei (Pfeiffer, 1856)
- Megalacron lufensis (Thiele, 1928)
- Megalacron macfarlanei (Cox, 1873)
- Megalacron melanesia Clench & Turner, 1964
- Megalacron migratoria (Pfeiffer, 1855)
- Megalacron novaegeorgiensis (Cox, 1870)
- Megalacron periwonensis (Dell, 1955)
- Megalacron phaeostoma (Pfeiffer, 1877)
- Megalacron sellersi (Cox, 1872)
- Megalacron spadicea (Fulton, 1902)
- Megalacron tabarensis (I. Rensch, 1933)
- Megalacron tizianoi Delsaerdt, 2016

Species brought into synonymy

- Megalacron huberi Thach, 2017: synonym of Chloritis khammouanensis Inkhavilay & Panha, 2019 (secondary junior homonym of Chloritis huberi Thach, 2016; Chloritis khammouanensis is a replacement name)
