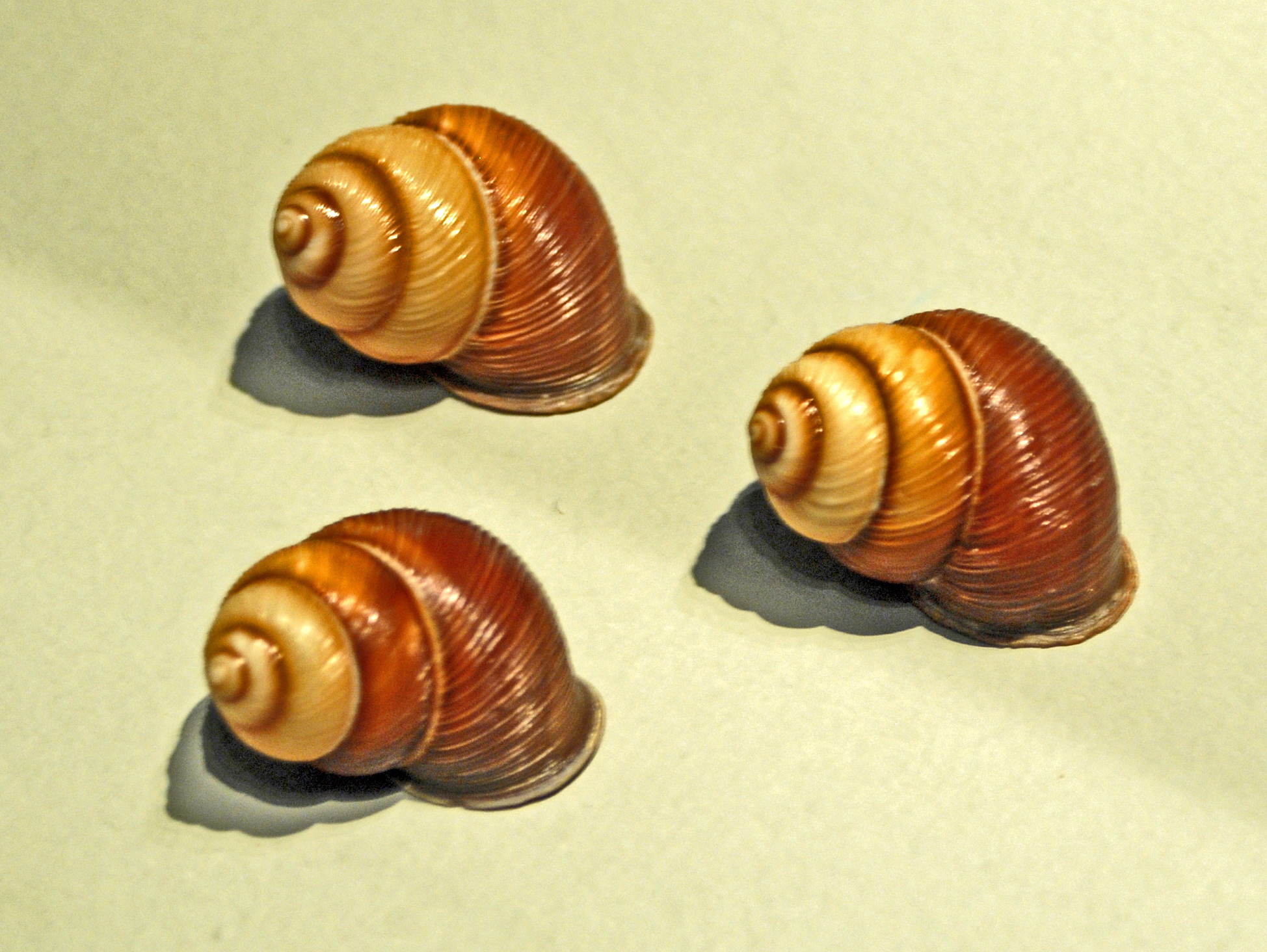
- Shells of Phoenicobius aratus

Scientific classification
- Kingdom: Animalia
- Phylum: Mollusca
- Class: Gastropoda
- Order: Stylommatophora
- Family: Camaenidae
- Subfamily: Helicostylinae
- Genus: Phoenicobius; Mörch, 1852

= Phoenicobius =

Genus of gastropods

Phoenicobius is a genus of medium-sized, air-breathing land snails, terrestrial pulmonate gastropod molluscs in the family Camaenidae.

== Species ==
- Phoenicobius adustus Sowerby, 1841
- Phoenicobius aratus Sowerby, 1841
- Phoenicobius brachydon Sowerby, 1841
- Phoenicobius campanulus Pfeiffer, 1845
- Phoenicobius oomorphus Sowerby, 1841
