= Baudinella =

Scientific classification
- Kingdom: Animalia
- Phylum: Mollusca
- Class: Gastropoda
- Order: Stylommatophora
- Family: Camaenidae
- Genus: Baudinella; Thiele, 1931

Genus of gastropods

Baudinella is a genus of air-breathing land snails, terrestrial pulmonate gastropod mollusks in the family Camaenidae.

== Species ==
Species within the genus Baudinella include:

- Baudinella baudinensis A. Smith, 1893
