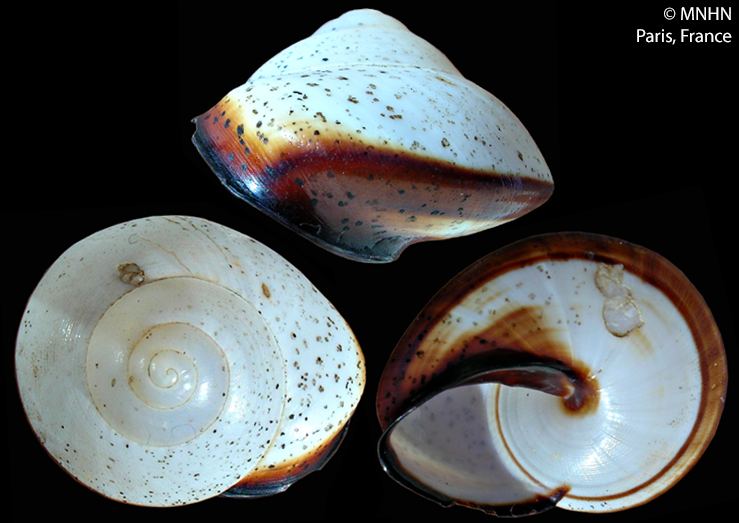
- Shell of Crystallopsis conica (specimen at MNHN, Paris)

Scientific classification
- Kingdom: Animalia
- Phylum: Mollusca
- Class: Gastropoda
- Order: Stylommatophora
- Family: Camaenidae
- Subfamily: Hadrinae
- Genus: Crystallopsis; Ancey, 1887

Type species
- Helix hunteri Cox, 1872

Synonyms
- Cristovala Clench, 1958; Crystallopsis (Cristovala) Clench, 1958· accepted, alternate representation; Crystallopsis (Crystallopsis) Ancey, 1887· accepted, alternate representation; Papuina (Crystallopsis) Ancey, 1887

= Crystallopsis =

Genus of gastropods

Crystallopsis is a genus of air-breathing land snails, terrestrial pulmonate gastropod molluscs in the family Camaenidae.

== Species ==
Species within the genus Crystallopsis include:

- Crystallopsis anadyomene (A. Adams & Angas, 1864)
- Crystallopsis aphrodite (Pfeiffer, 1859)
- Crystallopsis balcombei (Cox, 1873)
- Crystallopsis conica Gude, 1907
- Crystallopsis crystallina Clench, 1958
- Crystallopsis debilis Clapp, 1923
- Crystallopsis fictilia Clapp, 1923
- Crystallopsis fulakorensis Clapp, 1923
- Crystallopsis gowerensis (Boettger, 1918)
- Crystallopsis hunteri (Cox, 1872)
- Crystallopsis lactiflua (Pfeiffer, 1861)
- Crystallopsis psyche (Angas, 1870)
- Crystallopsis purchasi (Pfeiffer, 1858)
- Crystallopsis rennellensis Clench, 1958
- Crystallopsis rossiteri (Angas, 1869)
- Crystallopsis tricolor (Pfeiffer, 1850)
- Crystallopsis wisemani (Brazier, 1876)
- Crystallopsis woodfordi (G. B. Sowerby III, 1890)
