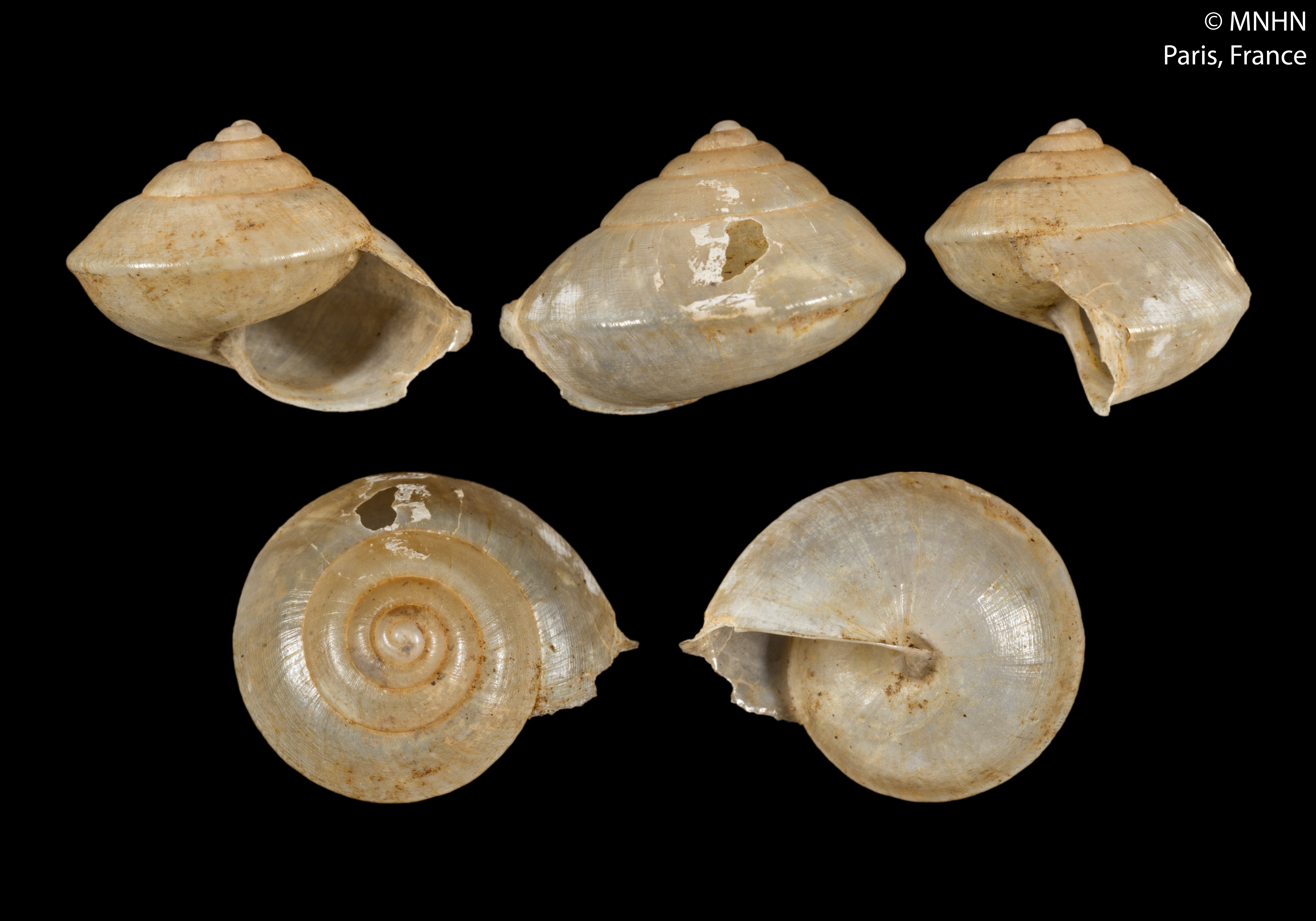
- Shell of Globotrochus onestera (syntype at MNHN, Paris)

Scientific classification
- Kingdom: Animalia
- Phylum: Mollusca
- Class: Gastropoda
- Order: Stylommatophora
- Superfamily: Helicoidea
- Family: Camaenidae
- Subfamily: Camaeninae
- Genus: Globotrochus; F. Haas, 1935

Type species
- Helix onestera Mabille, 1887

Synonyms
- Ganesella (Globotrochus) Haas, 1935

= Globotrochus =

Genus of gastropods

Globotrochus is a genus of air-breathing land snails, terrestrial pulmonate gastropod mollusks in the subfamily Camaeninae of the family Camaenidae.

== Species ==
Species within the genus Globotrochus include:

- Globotrochus mellea (Bavay & Dautzenberg, 1915)
- Globotrochus onestera (Mabille, 1887)
