= Beddomea =

Scientific classification
- Kingdom: Animalia
- Phylum: Mollusca
- Class: Gastropoda
- Order: Stylommatophora
- Family: Camaenidae
- Genus: Beddomea; G.Nevill, 1878

Synonyms
- Nanina (Thysanota) Albers, 1860; Queridomus Iredale, 1937

Genus of gastropods

Beddomea is a genus of air-breathing land snails, terrestrial pulmonate gastropod mollusks in the family Camaenidae. These snails are restricted to South India and Sri Lanka. and three species of its kind have been discovered.

== Species ==
- Beddomea albizonatus (Reeve 1849)
- Beddomea ceylanicus (Pfeiffer 1846)
- Beddomea intermedius (Pfeiffer 1855)
