= Cristigibba =

Scientific classification
- Domain: Eukaryota
- Kingdom: Animalia
- Phylum: Mollusca
- Class: Gastropoda
- Order: Stylommatophora
- Family: Camaenidae
- Genus: Cristigibba

Genus of gastropods

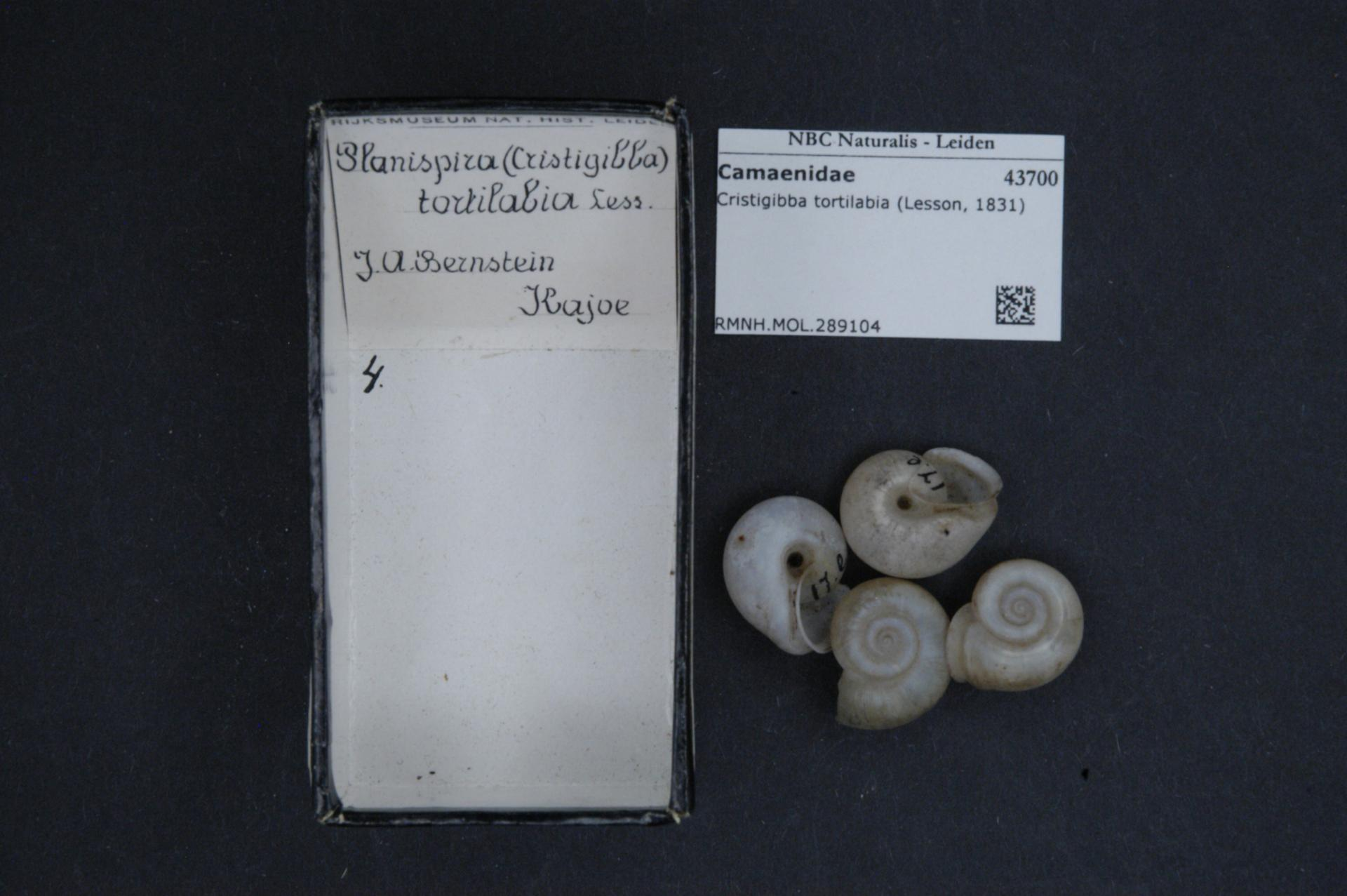
Cristigibba tortilabia.

Cristigibba is a genus of air-breathing land snail, a terrestrial pulmonate gastropod mollusk in the family Camaenidae.

== Species ==
Species within the genus Cristigibba:

- Cristigibba wesselensis
