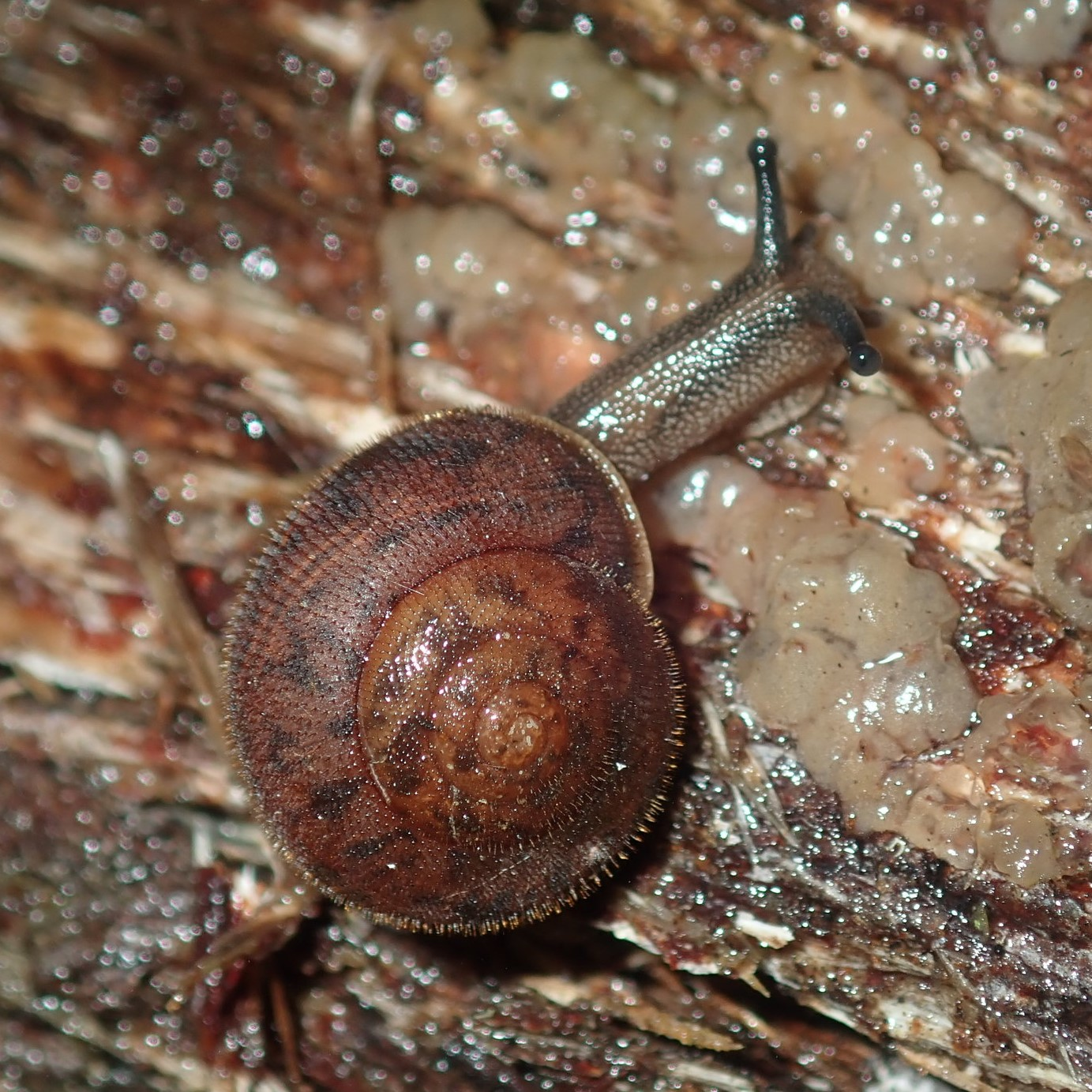
- Austrochloritis wollemiensis

Scientific classification
- Kingdom: Animalia
- Phylum: Mollusca
- Class: Gastropoda
- Order: Stylommatophora
- Family: Camaenidae
- Genus: Austrochloritis; Pilsbry, 1891

= Austrochloritis =

Genus of gastropods

Austrochloritis is a genus of air-breathing land snails, terrestrial pulmonate gastropod mollusks in the family Camaenidae.

== Species ==
Species within the genus Austrochloritis include:

- Austrochloritis ascensa
- Austrochloritis pusilla
