= Lacustrelix =

Scientific classification
- Kingdom: Animalia
- Phylum: Mollusca
- Class: Gastropoda
- Order: Stylommatophora
- Family: Camaenidae
- Genus: Lacustrelix; Iredale, 1937

Genus of gastropods

Lacustrelix is a genus of air-breathing land snails, terrestrial pulmonate gastropod mollusks in the family Camaenidae.

== Species ==
Species within the genus Lacustrelix include:

- Lacustrelix minor
- Lacustrelix yerelinana
