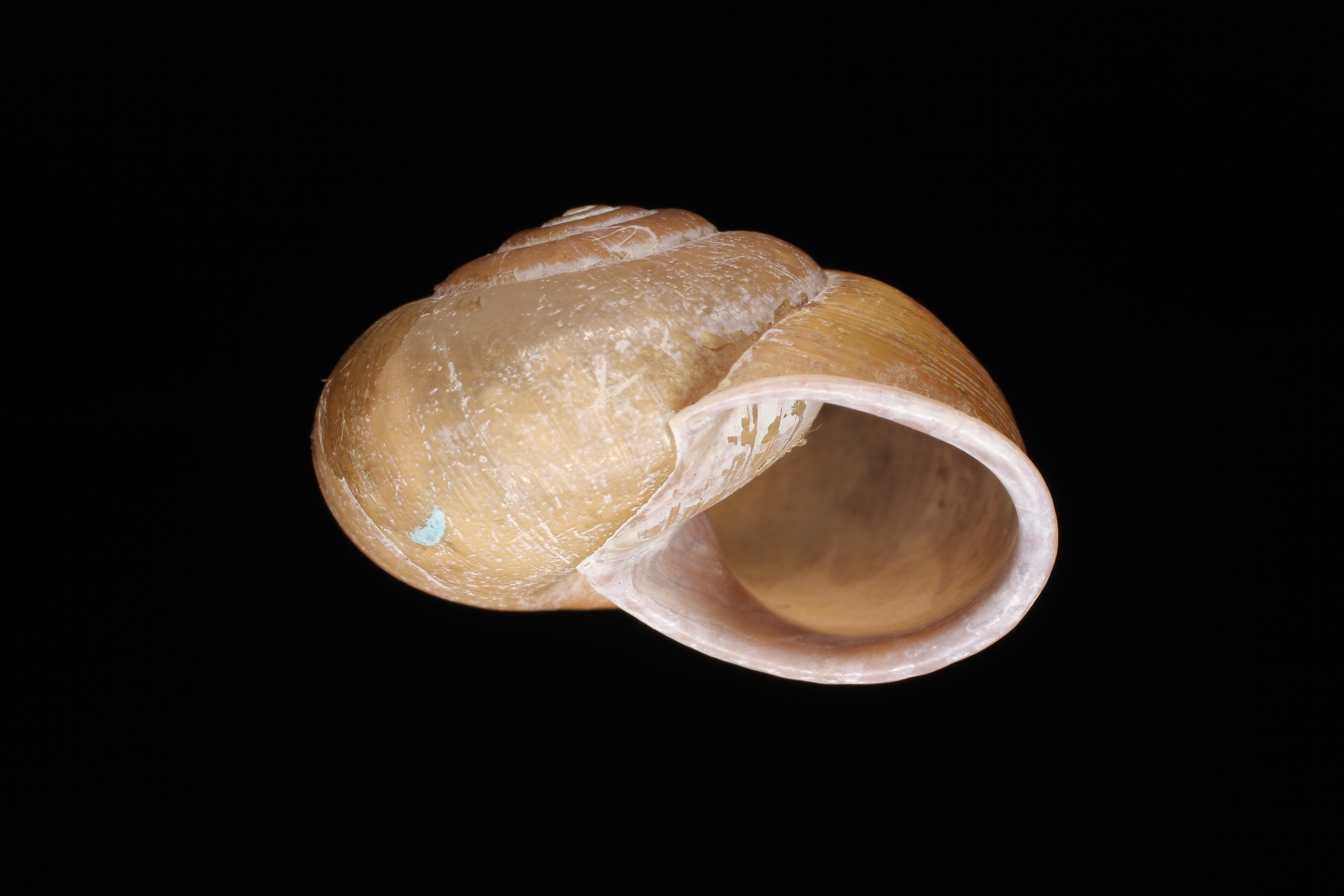
- Shell of Philbouchetia franzhuberi (holotype at MNHN, Paris)

Scientific classification
- Domain: Eukaryota
- Kingdom: Animalia
- Phylum: Mollusca
- Class: Gastropoda
- Order: Stylommatophora
- Infraorder: Helicoidei
- Superfamily: Helicoidea
- Family: Camaenidae
- Genus: Philbouchetia; Thach, 2020

Type species
- Philbouchetia franzhuberi Thach, 2020

= Philbouchetia =

Genus of air-breathing land snails

Philbouchetia is a genus of air-breathing land snails, terrestrial pulmonate gastropod mollusks in the family Camaenidae.

== Species ==
- Philbouchetia franzhuberi Thach, 2020 (length : 30.6 mm; distribution: Laos)
