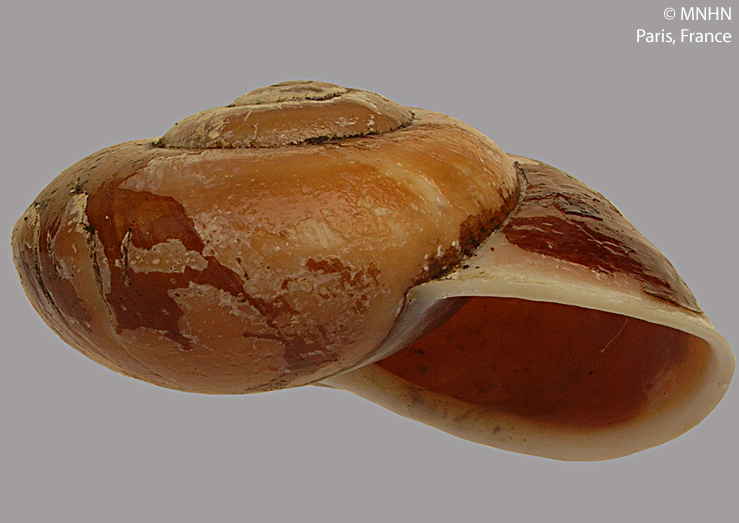
- Shell of Quirosena scorteus (specimen at MNHN, Paris)

Scientific classification
- Kingdom: Animalia
- Phylum: Mollusca
- Class: Gastropoda
- Order: Stylommatophora
- Infraorder: Helicoidei
- Superfamily: Helicoidea
- Family: Camaenidae
- Genus: Quirosena; Iredale, 1941

Type species
- Helix bougainvillei L. Pfeiffer, 1860

= Quirosena =

Genus of gastropods

Quirosena is a genus of gastropods in the subfamily Hadrinae belonging to the family Camaenidae.

== Species ==
- Quirosena bougainvillei (L. Pfeiffer, 1860)
- Quirosena scorteus (Vanatta, 1930)
