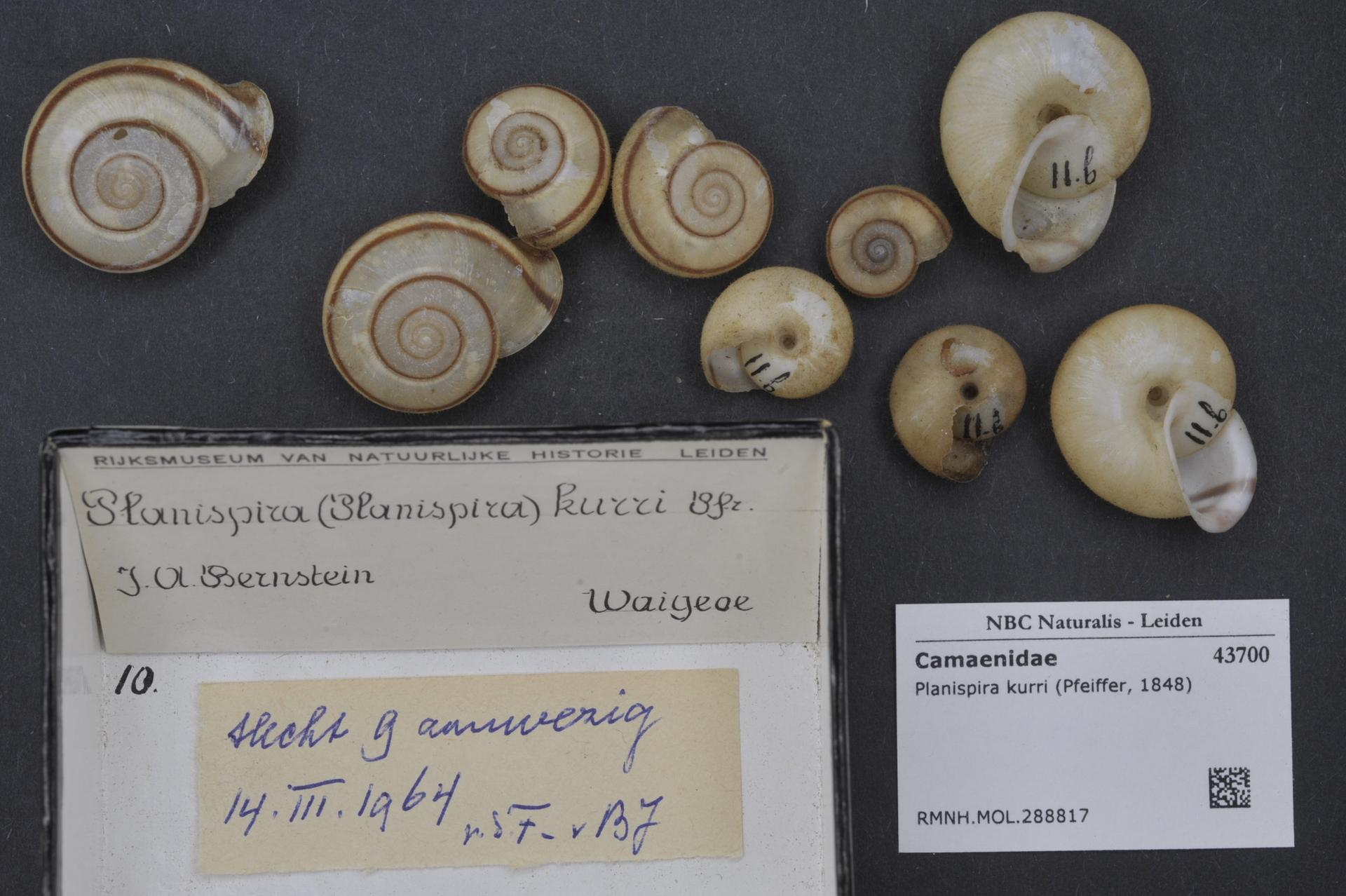
- Planispira kurri

Scientific classification
- Kingdom: Animalia
- Phylum: Mollusca
- Class: Gastropoda
- Order: Stylommatophora
- Superfamily: Helicoidea
- Family: Camaenidae
- Subfamily: Hadrinae
- Genus: Planispira; Beck, 1837

Synonyms
- Planospira Gray, 1847

= Planispira =

Genus of gastropods

Planispira is a genus of gastropods belonging to the family Camaenidae.

The species of this genus are found in Southeastern Asia, Australia.

Species:

- Planispira admirabilis E.A.Smith, 1896
- Planispira adonarana Fulton, 1899
- Planispira albodentata E.A.Smith, 1899
- Planispira aldrichi J.B.Henderson, 1898
- Planispira armstrongi (E.A.Smith, 1895)
- Planispira atkinsoni (Theobald, 1859)
- Planispira atrofusca (L.Pfeiffer, 1861)
- Planispira buelowi Rolle, 1903
- Planispira deaniana (Ford, 1890)
- Planispira dulcissma E.A.Smith, 1898
- Planispira exceptiuncula (Férussac, 1823)
- Planispira expansa (L.Pfeiffer, 1861)
- Planispira finschi Thiele, 1928
- Planispira flavidula (E.von Martens, 1867)
- Planispira gabata (Gould, 1843)
- Planispira infracta (E.von Martens, 1896)
- Planispira keiensis Thiele, 1928
- Planispira kendigiana Möllendorff, 1902
- Planispira kurri (L.Pfeiffer, 1848)
- Planispira latizona (L.Pfeiffer, 1864)
- Planispira liedtkei Möllendorff, 1902
- Planispira loxotropis (L.Pfeiffer, 1850)
- Planispira margaritis (L.Pfeiffer, 1850)
- Planispira moluccensis (L.Pfeiffer, 1850)
- Planispira nagporensis (L.Pfeiffer, 1860)
- Planispira pruinosa Möllendorff, 1902
- Planispira quadrifasciata (Le Guillou, 1842)
- Planispira rollei Möllendorff, 1902
- Planispira scheepmakeri (L.Pfeiffer, 1850)
- Planispira semiquadrivolvis (E.von Martens, 1903)
- Planispira simbangensis Kobelt, 1898
- Planispira spiriplana Möllendorff, 1902
- Planispira sumbana B.Rensch, 1933
- Planispira torticollis (Le Guillou, 1842)
- Planispira tricolor Thiele, 1928
- Planispira zebra (L.Pfeiffer, 1850)
- Planispira zonaria (Linnaeus, 1767)
