= Youwanjela =

Scientific classification
- Kingdom: Animalia
- Phylum: Mollusca
- Class: Gastropoda
- Order: Stylommatophora
- Superfamily: Helicoidea
- Family: Camaenidae
- Subfamily: Hadrinae
- Genus: Youwanjela; Köhler & Shea, 2012

Type species
- Hadra wilsoni Solem, 1979

Genus of gastropods

Youwanjela is a genus of air-breathing land snails, terrestrial pulmonate gastropod molluscs in the family Camaenidae.

== Species ==
- Youwanjela wilsoni (Solem, 1979)
