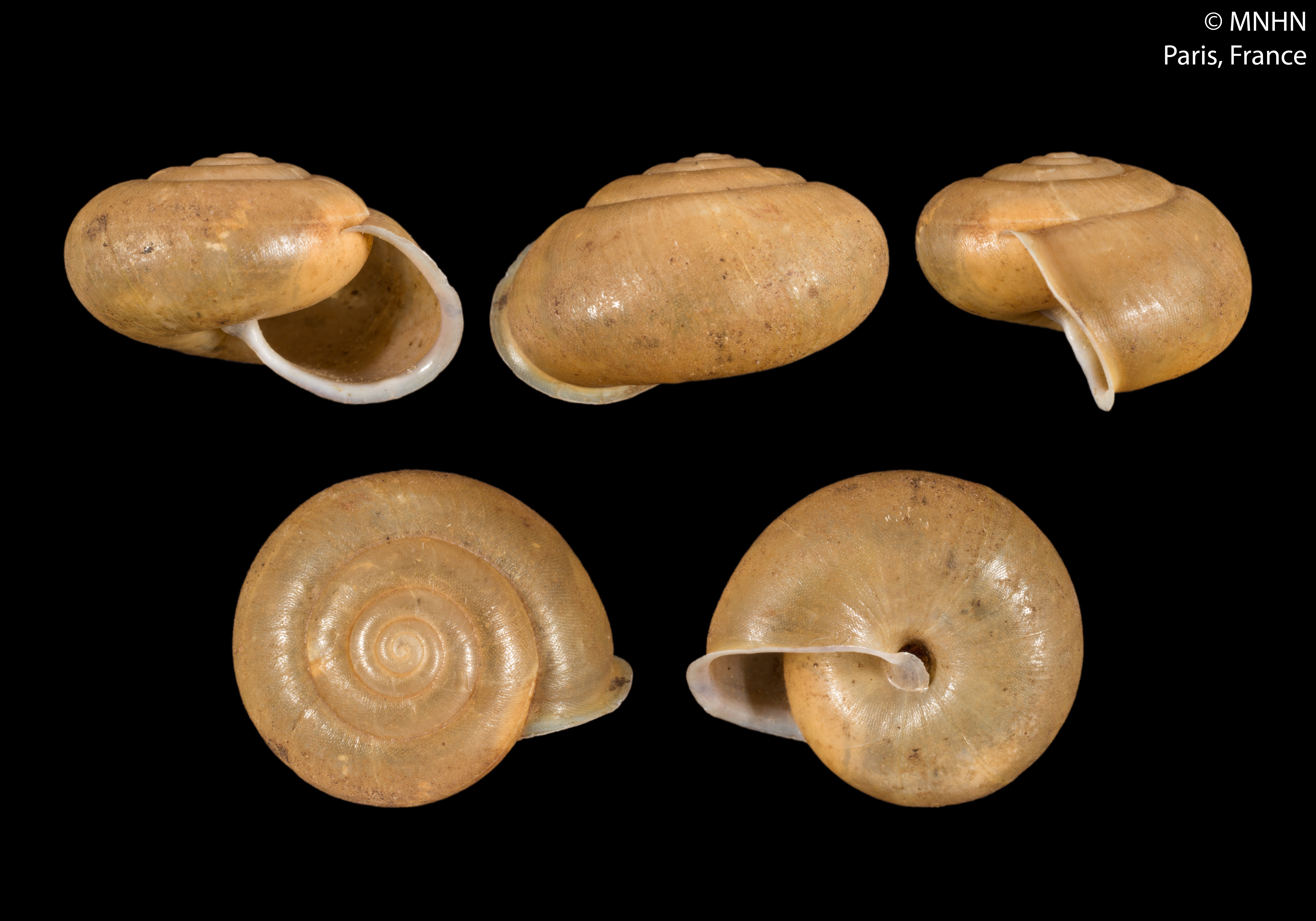
- Shell of Trachia limatulata (syntype at MNHN, Paris)

Scientific classification
- Kingdom: Animalia
- Phylum: Mollusca
- Class: Gastropoda
- Order: Stylommatophora
- Superfamily: Helicoidea
- Family: Camaenidae
- Subfamily: Camaeninae
- Genus: Trachia; E. von Martens, 1860

Type species
- Helix asperella L. Pfeiffer, 1846

Synonyms
- Eurystoma Albers, 1850; Helix (Eurystoma) Albers, 1850; Helix (Trachia) E. von Martens, 1860; Planispira (Trachia) E. von Martens, 1860

= Trachia =

Genus of gastropods

Trachia is a genus of air-breathing land snails, terrestrial pulmonate gastropod mollusks in the family Camaenidae.

These snails are found from Western Ghats of India, Sri Lanka, Sabah and Singapore.

== Species ==
The following species are recognized.

- Trachia albicostis (Pfeiffer, 1860)
- Trachia asperella (L. Pfeiffer, 1846)
- Trachia clarus (Godwin-Austen, 1888)
- Trachia contracta (Benson, 1864)
- Trachia cordieri (Bavay & Dautzenberg, 1908)
- Trachia crassicostata (Benson, 1848)
- Trachia diestalmena (Dautzenberg & Fischer, 1908)
- Trachia emensus (Godwin-Austen, 1888)
- Trachia fallaciosa (Férussac, 1832)
- Trachia footei Stoliczka, 1873
- Trachia hardouini (de Morgan, 1885)
- Trachia lambineti (Bavay & Dautzenberg, 1899)
- Trachia limatulata (Bavay & Dautzenberg, 1908)
- Trachia nangporensis (L. Pfeiffer, 1860)
- Trachia nilagirica (Pfeiffer, 1846)
- Trachia pilisparsa (E. von Martens, 1885)
- Trachia proxima (Férussac, 1832)
- Trachia pudica (Godwin-Austen, 1891)
- Trachia reinachae (C. R. Boettger, 1908)
- Trachia ruginosa (Férussac, 1832)
- Trachia serpentinitica Vermeulen, Liew & Schilthuizen, 2015
- Trachia smithi (Bock, 1881)
- Trachia sordida (L. Pfeiffer, 1842)
- Trachia trochalia (Benson, 1861)
- Trachia wrayi (de Morgan, 1885)

Species brought into synonymy

- Trachia balansai (Morlet, 1886): synonym of Chloritis balansai (Morlet, 1886)
- Trachia delibrata (Benson, 1836): synonym of Bouchetcamaena delibrata (Benson, 1836) (superseded combination, unaccepted combination )
- Trachia durandi (Bavay & Dautzenberg, 1900): synonym of Chloritis durandi (Bavay & Dautzenberg, 1900) (subsequent combination)
- Trachia froggatti Ancey, 1898: synonym of Westraltrachia froggatti (Ancey, 1898) (original combination)
- Trachia gabata (A. Gould, 1843): synonym of Chloritis gabata (A. Gould, 1843) (unaccepted combination )
- Trachia marimberti (Bavay & Dautzenberg, 1900): synonym of Chloritis marimberti (Bavay & Dautzenberg, 1900) (subsequent combination)
- Trachia monogramma Ancey, 1898: synonym of Trachia froggatti Ancey, 1898: synonym of Westraltrachia froggatti (Ancey, 1898) (original combination)
- Trachia nasuta (Bavay & Dautzenberg, 1908): synonym of Chloritis nasuta (Bavay & Dautzenberg, 1909) (subsequent combination)
- Trachia norodomiana (Morlet, 1883): synonym of Trichochloritis norodomiana (Morlet, 1883) (subsequent combination)
- Trachia orthocheila Ancey, 1898: synonym of Westraltrachia derbyi (Cox, 1892) (junior synonym)
- Trachia penangensis Stoliczka, 1873: synonym of Trichochloritis penangensis (Stoliczka, 1873) (original combination)
- Trachia pseudomiara (Bavay & Dautzenberg, 1908): synonym of Bellatrachia pseudomiara (Bavay & Dautzenberg, 1909) : synonym of Trichochloritis pseudomiara (Bavay & Dautzenberg, 1909)
- Trachia vittata (Müller, 1774): synonym of Pseudotrachia vittata (O. F. Müller, 1774) (unaccepted combination)
