= Posorites =

Scientific classification
- Kingdom: Animalia
- Phylum: Mollusca
- Class: Gastropoda
- Order: Stylommatophora
- Family: Camaenidae
- Genus: Posorites; Iredale, 1933

Genus of gastropods

Posorites is a genus of air-breathing land snails, terrestrial pulmonate gastropod mollusks in the family Camaenidae.

== Species ==
Species within the genus Posorites include:

- Posorites fucata
- Posorites conscendens
- Posorites turneri
