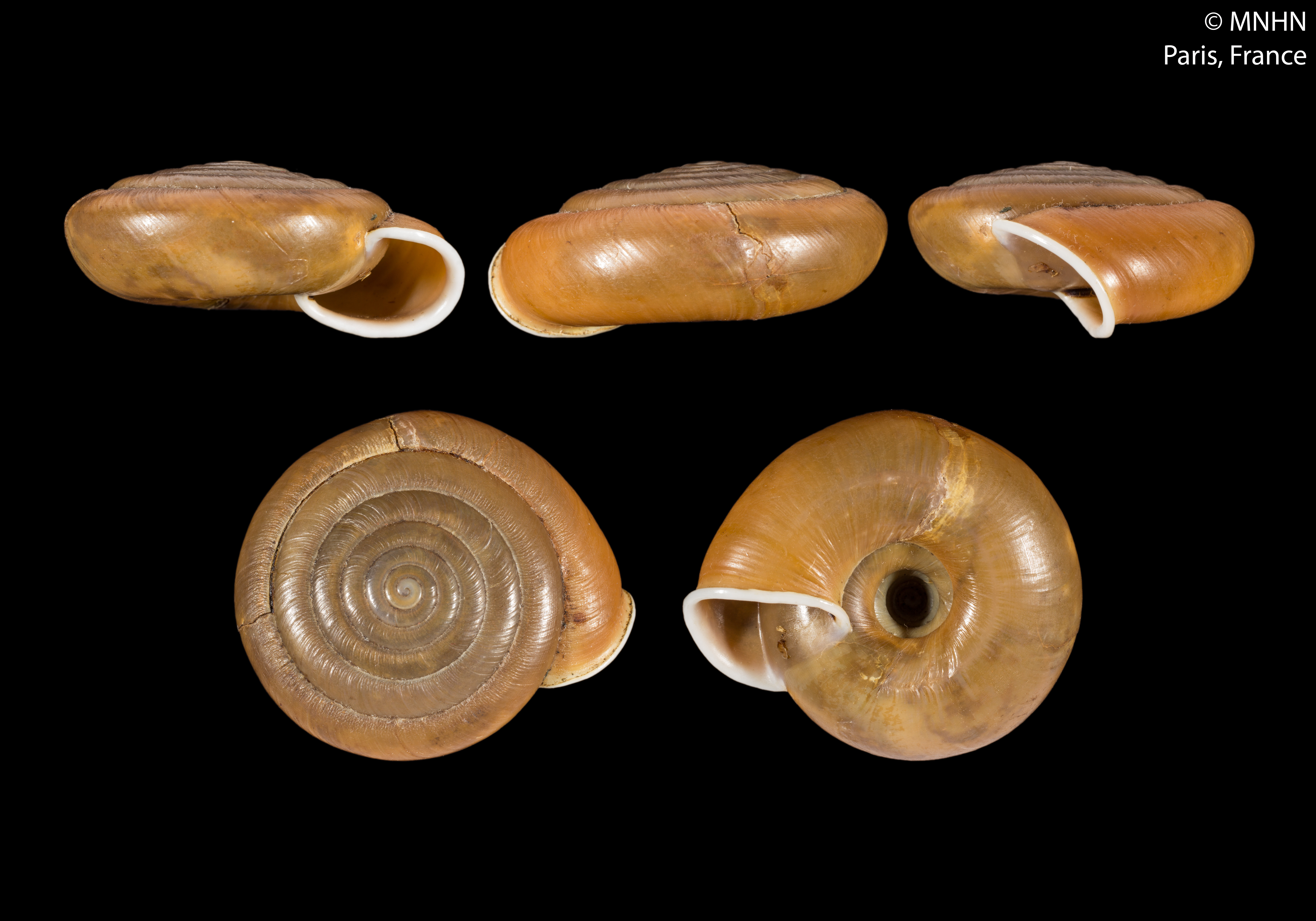
- Shell of Entadella cavaleriei (holotype at MNHN, Paris)

Scientific classification
- Kingdom: Animalia
- Phylum: Mollusca
- Class: Gastropoda
- Order: Stylommatophora
- Superfamily: Helicoidea
- Family: Camaenidae
- Subfamily: Camaeninae
- Genus: Entadella; Páll-Gergely & Hunyadi, 2016

Type species
- Entadella entadiformis Páll-Gergely & Hunyadi, 2016

= Entadella =

Genus of gastropods

Entadella is a genus of air-breathing land snails, terrestrial pulmonate gastropod mollusks in the subfamily Camaeninae of the family Camaenidae.

== Species ==
Species within the genus Entadella include:

- Entadella athrix (Möllendorff, 1901)
- Entadella cavaleriei (Bavay, 1913)
- Entadella concava Páll-Gergely & Hunyadi, 2019
- Entadella entadiformis Páll-Gergely & Hunyadi, 2016
- Entadella kilchomani Páll-Gergely, 2019
