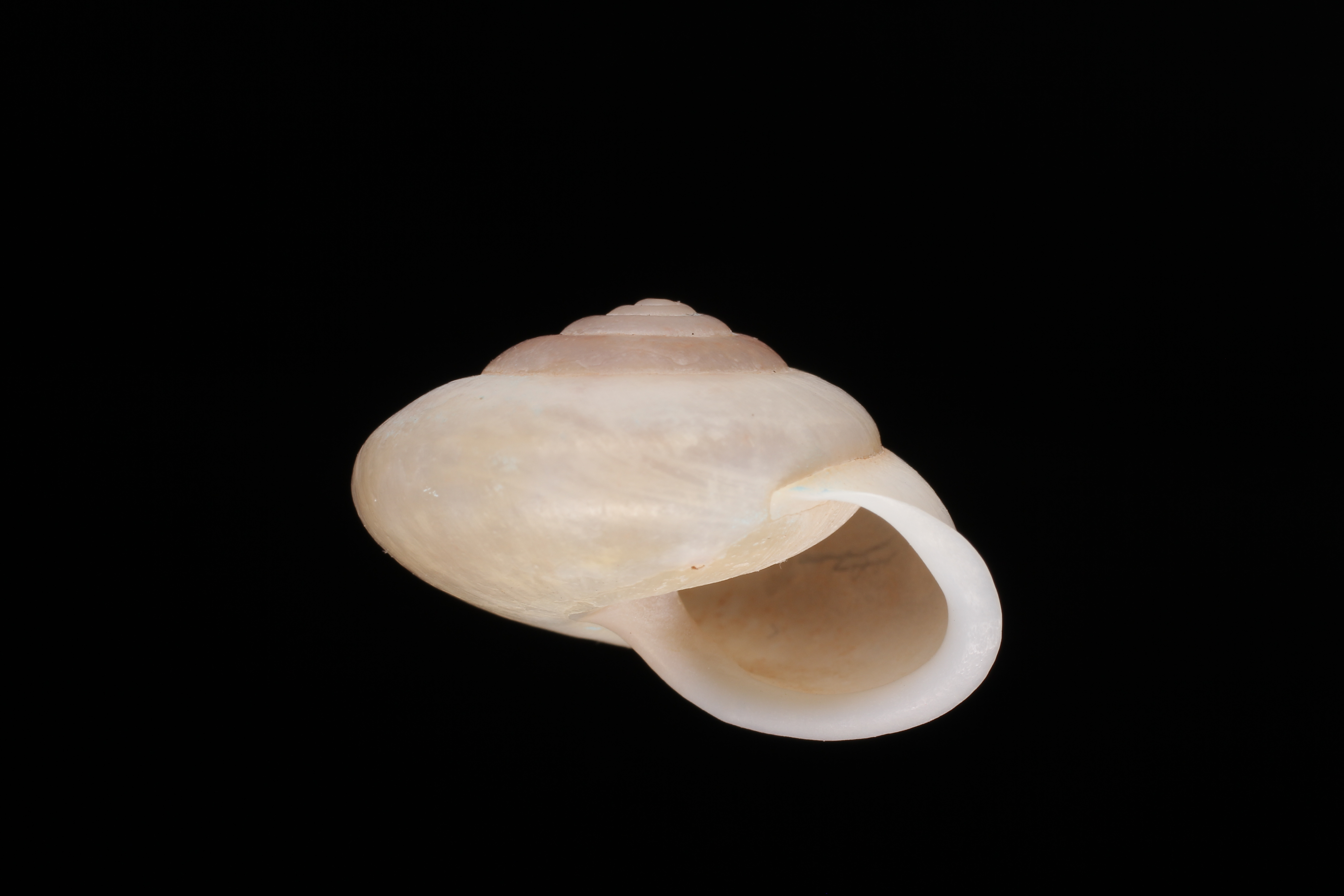
- Shell of Calvigenia owengriffithsi (holotype at MNHN, Paris)

Scientific classification
- Kingdom: Animalia
- Phylum: Mollusca
- Class: Gastropoda
- Order: Stylommatophora
- Superfamily: Helicoidea
- Family: Camaenidae
- Subfamily: Hadrinae
- Genus: Calvigenia; Iredale, 1938

Type species
- Helix blackmani Cox, 1868

= Calvigenia =

Genus of gastropods

Calvigenia is a genus of air-breathing land snails in the subfamily Hadrinae of the family Camaenidae.

== Species ==
Species within the genus Calvigenia include:

- Calvigenia blackmani (Cox, 1868)
- Calvigenia cognata (Gude, 1907)
- Calvigenia cootha Stanisic & Potter, 2010
- Calvigenia mucida (Pfeiffer, 1857)
- Calvigenia owengriffithsi Thach & F. Huber, 2020
