= Australocosmica =

Scientific classification
- Kingdom: Animalia
- Phylum: Mollusca
- Class: Gastropoda
- Order: Stylommatophora
- Family: Camaenidae
- Genus: Australocosmica; Köhler, 2011

Genus of gastropods

Australocosmica is a genus of air-breathing land snails, terrestrial pulmonate gastropod mollusks in the family Camaenidae.

The genus was first described in 2011 by Frank Köhler. The type species is Australocosmica augustae.

== Species ==
Species within the genus Australocosmica:

- Australocosmica augustae Köhler, 2011
- Australocosmica bernoulliensis Criscione & Köhler, 2013
- Australocosmica buffonensis Criscione & Köhler, 2013
- Australocosmica crassicostata Criscione & Köhler, 2013
- Australocosmica nana Criscione & Köhler, 2013
- Australocosmica pallida Criscione & Köhler, 2013
- Australocosmica rotunda Criscione & Köhler, 2013
- Australocosmica sanctumpatriciusae Köhler, 2011
- Australocosmica vulcanica Köhler, 2011
