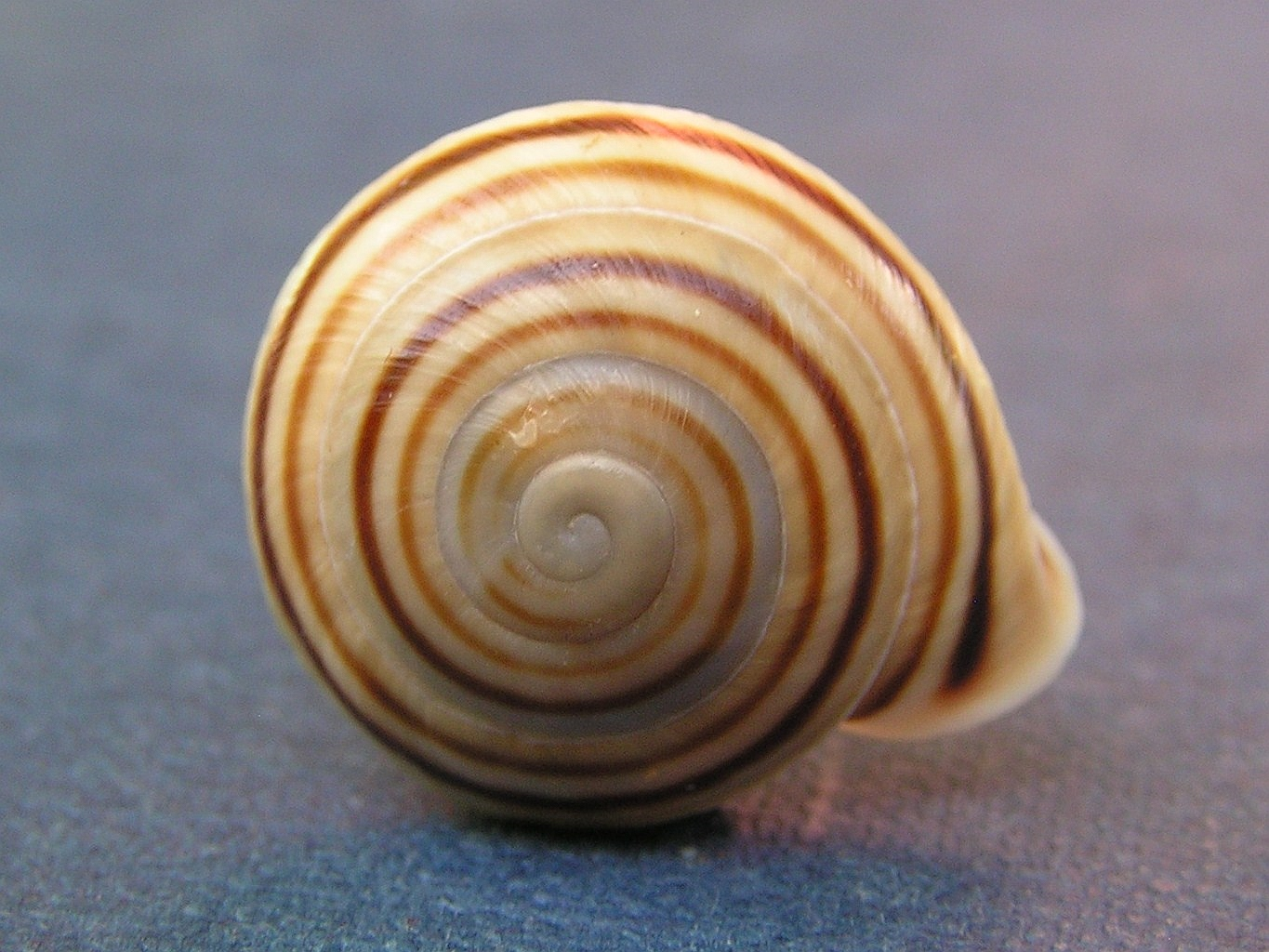
- Shell of Obba bigonia

Scientific classification
- Kingdom: Animalia
- Phylum: Mollusca
- Class: Gastropoda
- Order: Stylommatophora
- Superfamily: Helicoidea
- Family: Camaenidae
- Subfamily: Camaeninae
- Genus: Obba; Beck, 1837

Type species
- Helix planulata Lamarck, 1822

Synonyms
- Gallina Hartmann, 1843; Helix (Obba) Beck, 1837; Helix (Philina) Albers, 1850 (junior synonym); Obbina C. Semper, 1873 (invalid: objective junior synonym); Philidora de Morgan, 1885 (invalid: unnecessary substitute name for Philina Albers, 1850, by de Morgan treated as a homonym of Philine Ascanius, 1762.); Philina Albers, 1850 (junior synonym); Pusiodon Swainson, 1840

= Obba (gastropod) =

Genus of gastropods

Obba is a genus of air-breathing land snails in the subfamily Camaeninae of the family Camaenidae.

== Species ==
Species within the genus Obba include:

- Obba basidentata (L. Pfeiffer, 1857)
- Obba bigonia (Férussac, 1823)
- Obba bulacanensis (Hidalgo, 1888)
- Obba bustoi (Hidalgo, 1887)
- Obba calcar (Martens, 1864)
- Obba camelus (L. Pfeiffer, 1855)
- Obba columbaria (G. B. Sowerby I, 1841)
- Obba flavopicta (Quadras & Möllendorff, 1894)
- Obba gallinula (L. Pfeiffer, 1845)
- Obba hemiodon (Möllendorff, 1898)
- Obba horizontalis (L. Pfeiffer, 1845)
- Obba kochiana (Möllendorff, 1888)
- Obba lasallii (Eydoux, 1838)
- Obba listeri (Gray, 1825)
- Obba livesayi (L. Pfeiffer, 1860)
- Obba louiseae Thach, 2016
- Obba marginata (Müller, 1774)
- Obba marmorata (Möllendorff, 1898)
- Obba mesai Bartsch, 1939
- Obba moricandi (L. Pfeiffer, 1842)
- Obba morongensis (Möllendorff, 1889)
- Obba papilla (Müller, 1774)
- Obba parmula (Broderip, 1841)
- Obba planulata (Lamarck, 1822)
- Obba platyzona (Möllendorff, 1890)
- Obba quoyi (Deshayes, 1838)
- Obba reeveana (L. Pfeiffer, 1846)
- Obba rota (Broderip, 1841)
- Obba saranganica (Hidalgo, 1887)
- Obba scrobiculata (L. Pfeiffer, 1842)
- Obba subhorizontalis (Möllendorff, 1894)
- Obba viridiflava (Möllendorff, 1894)

Species brought into synonymy

- Obba heroica (L. Pfeiffer, 1855): synonym of Obba papilla (Müller, 1774) (superseded combination)
- Obba lasallei (Eydoux, 1838): synonym of Obba lasallii (Eydoux, 1838) (invalid: incorrect subsequent spelling)
