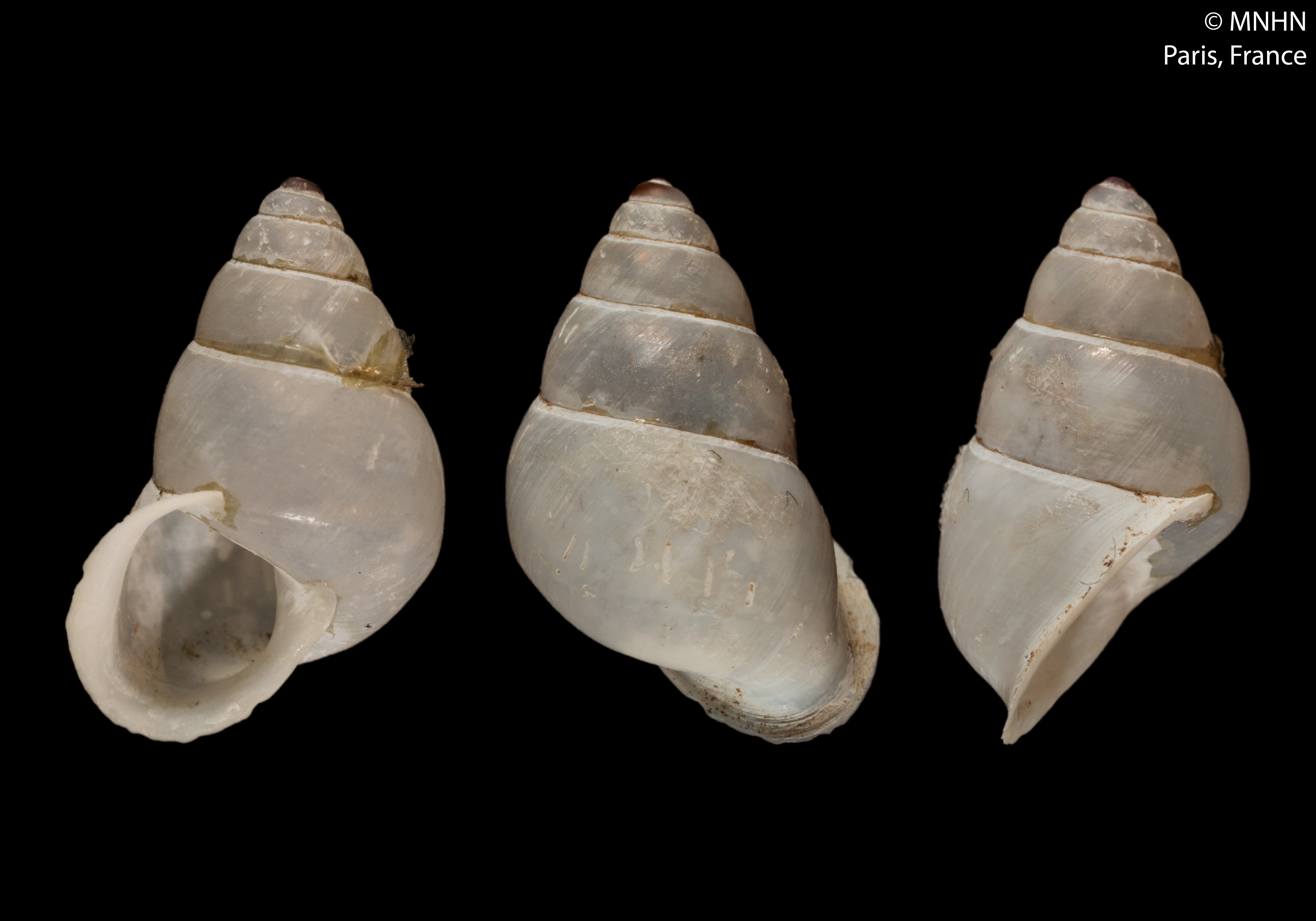
- Shell of Pseudopartula huberi (holotype at MNHN, Paris)

Scientific classification
- Kingdom: Animalia
- Phylum: Mollusca
- Class: Gastropoda
- Order: Stylommatophora
- Infraorder: Helicoidei
- Superfamily: Helicoidea
- Family: Camaenidae
- Genus: Pseudopartula; L. Pfeiffer, 1856

Type species
- Bulimus galericulum Mousson, 1849

Synonyms
- Amphidromus (Pseudopartula) L. Pfeiffer, 1856; Bulimus (Pseudopartula) L. Pfeiffer, 1856 (original rank)

= Pseudopartula =

Genus of gastropods

Pseudopartula is a genus of air-breathing land snails, terrestrial pulmonate gastropod mollusks in the subfamily Camaeninae of the family Camaenidae.

== Species ==
- Pseudopartula arborascens Butot, 1955
- Pseudopartula dohertyi (T. H. Aldrich, 1892)
- Pseudopartula galericulum (Mousson, 1849)
- Pseudopartula goudi Thach, 2021
- Pseudopartula huberi Thach, 2016
- Pseudopartula jomi Dumrongrojwattana & Dharma, 2020
- Pseudopartula juliae Thach, 2021
- Pseudopartula khoai Thach, 2021
- Pseudopartula parsonsi Thach, 2021
- Pseudopartula tuani Thach, 2021
- Pseudopartula pingshiangi Thach, 2024
