= Marilynessa =

Scientific classification
- Kingdom: Animalia
- Phylum: Mollusca
- Class: Gastropoda
- Order: Stylommatophora
- Family: Camaenidae
- Subfamily: Hadrinae
- Genus: Marilynessa; Stanisic, 2010

Genus of gastropods

Marilynessa is a genus of gastropods belonging to the subfamily Hadrinae of the family Camaenidae.

The species of this genus are found in Australia.

Species:

- Marilynessa findera (Iredale, 1937)
- Marilynessa macneilli (Iredale, 1937)
- Marilynessa starena (Iredale, 1937)
- Marilynessa thorogoodi (Iredale, 1937)
- Marilynessa yulei (Forbes, 1852)
