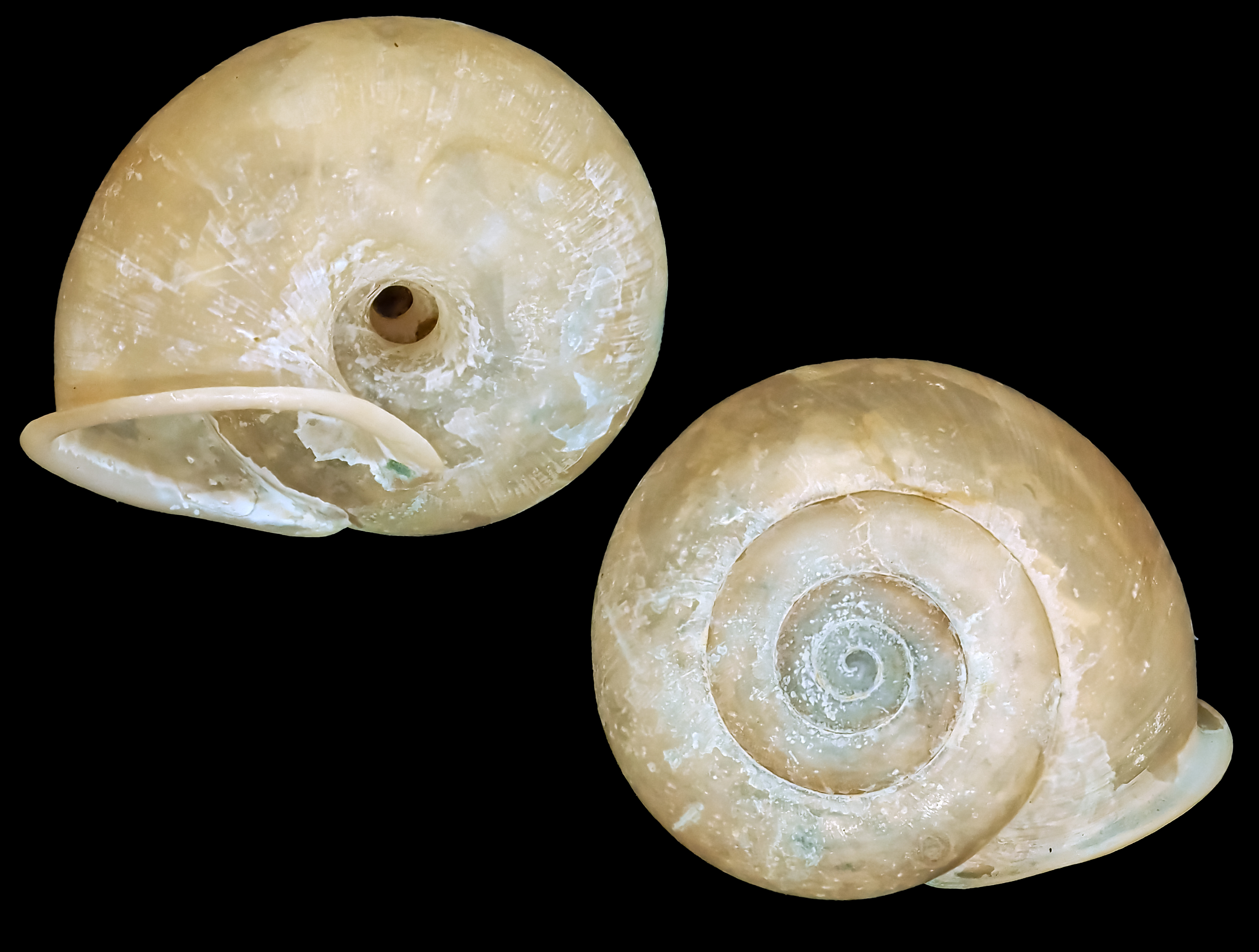
- Shell of Trichochloritis stanisici (holotype at MNHN, Paris)

Scientific classification
- Kingdom: Animalia
- Phylum: Mollusca
- Class: Gastropoda
- Order: Stylommatophora
- Infraorder: Helicoidei
- Superfamily: Helicoidea
- Family: Camaenidae
- Genus: Trichochloritis; Pilsbry, 1891

Type species
- Helix breviseta L. Pfeiffer, 1862

Synonyms
- Chloritis (Trichochloritis) Pilsbry, 1891; Helix (Trichochloritis) Pilsbry, 1891 (original rank)

= Trichochloritis =

Genus of gastropods

Trichochloritis is a genus of air-breathing land snails, terrestrial pulmonate gastropod mollusks in the subfamily Camaeninae of the family Camaenidae.

== Species ==
- Trichochloritis adaequata (Gredler, 1894)
- Trichochloritis breviseta (L. Pfeiffer, 1862)
- Trichochloritis diploblepharis (Möllendorff, 1897)
- Trichochloritis fouresi (Morlet, 1886)
- Trichochloritis gereti (Bavay & Dautzenberg, 1900)
- Trichochloritis herziana (Möllendorff, 1888)
- Trichochloritis huberi (Thach, 2018)
- Trichochloritis hunanensis Yen, 1939
- Trichochloritis hungerfordiana (Möllendorff, 1884)
- Trichochloritis insularis (Möllendorff, 1901)
- Trichochloritis mansonensis (Gude, 1906)
- Trichochloritis miara (Mabille, 1887)
- Trichochloritis mola (Heude, 1885)
- Trichochloritis molina (Heude, 1890)
- Trichochloritis mussonena Páll-Gergely, 2020
- Trichochloritis norodomiana (Morlet, 1883)
- Trichochloritis penangensis (Stoliczka, 1873)
- Trichochloritis percussa (Heude, 1882)
- Trichochloritis pseudomiara (Bavay & Dautzenberg, 1909)
- Trichochloritis puberula (Heude, 1885)
- Trichochloritis rhinocerotica (Heude, 1890)
- Trichochloritis stanisici Thach, 2021
- Trichochloritis tanquereyi (Crosse & P. Fischer, 1863)
- Trichochloritis thaitieni Thach, 2021

Synonyms

- Trichochloritis athrix (Möllendorff, 1901): synonym of Entadella athrix (Möllendorff, 1901)
- Trichochloritis brevidens (G. B. Sowerby I, 1841): synonym of Dentichloritis brevidens (G. B. Sowerby I, 1841) (unaccepted combination)
- Trichochloritis condoriana (Crosse & P. Fischer, 1863): synonym of Bellatrachia condoriana (Crosse & P. Fischer, 1863) (subsequent combination)
- Trichochloritis diplochone (Möllendorff, 1898): synonym of Chloritis diplochone Möllendorff, 1898 (subsequent combination)
- Trichochloritis microtricha (Möllendorff, 1898): synonym of Bellatrachia condoriana (Crosse & P. Fischer, 1863) (junior synonym)
- Trichochloritis submissa (Deshayes, 1874): synonym of Trichobradybaena submissa (Deshayes, 1874) (unaccepted combination)
