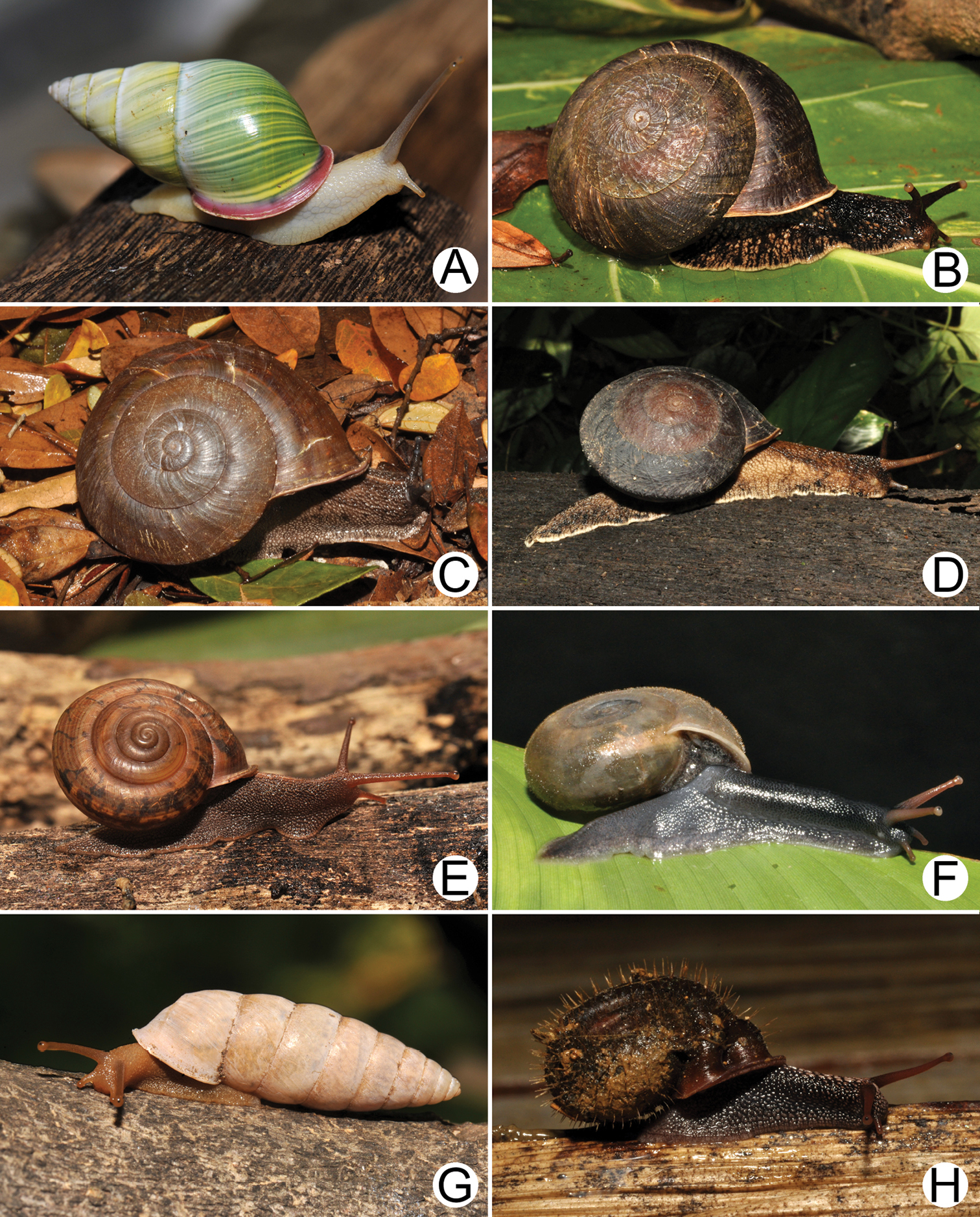

Scientific classification
- Kingdom: Animalia
- Phylum: Mollusca
- Class: Gastropoda
- Order: Stylommatophora
- Superfamily: Helicoidea
- Family: Camaenidae; Pilsbry, 1895

Type genus
- Camaena Albers, 1850

Genera
- See text

Synonyms
- Bradybaenidae Pilsbry, 1934 (1898); Crassispirinae McLean, 1971; Zonulispirinae McLean, 1971

= Camaenidae =

Family of gastropods

Camaenidae is a family of air-breathing land snails, terrestrial pulmonate gastropod mollusks in the superfamily Helicoidea, the typical snails and their allies. This is one of the most diverse families in the clade Stylommatophora.

These snails occur in a wide variety of habitats in the tropics of Eastern Asia and Australasia.

A large American group, which is mainly represented by species from the Caribbean, has, until recently, also been subsumed under the Camaenidae. However, latest molecular phylogenetic studies showed that these species represent a different family, the Pleurodontidae.

This molecular study also implies that the Bradybaeninae, previously treated as a distinct family within the Helicoidea, is a junior synonym of the Camaenidae.

== Anatomy ==
Camaenid shells are often quite large (25–50 mm), but a number of species also have small shells (<5 mm). Shells reveal a remarkable diversity in shape and colour, which is partly linked with their lifestyle. For instance, arboreal species tend to have large and conical shells, whereas terrestrial species often have rather flat shells. The shells of some taxa can be vividly coloured, showing banding or other conspicuous patterns, but others are plain and uniform.

This family is defined by a missing stimulatory organ. There are no synapomorphies uniting this diverse family. The Australasian group is a closely related to the Bradybaeninae.

In this family, the number of haploid chromosomes lies between 26 and 30 (according to the values in this table).

== Taxonomy ==
Division into subfamilies has been suggested, however, given the unresolved relationships on the family level, the subfamilial treatments must be considered hypothetical. They do not reflect the results of comprehensive phylogenetic analyses and are not corroborated by current molecular data.

The following three subfamilies have been recognized in the taxonomy of Bouchet & Rocroi (2005) (as based on a suggestion of Alan Solem)

- subfamily Camaeninae Pilbry, 1895 – synonyms: Amphidrominae Kobelt, 1902; Hadridae Iredale, 1937; Xanthomelontidae Iredale, 1937; Chloritidae Iredale, 1938; Papuinidae Iredale, 1938; Calyciidae Iredale, 1941; Planispiridae Iredale, 1941; Cristovalinae Schileyko, 2003
- subfamily Rhagadinae Iredale, 1938
- subfamily Sinumeloninae Solem, 1992

A different taxonomy of the Caemenidae was used by Schileyko (1998–2003).

The new taxonomy of the gastropods, published in 2017 and accepted by WoRMS, gives the following subfamilies:

- Camaeninae Pilsbry, 1895 [= Amphidrominae Kobelt, 1902]
- Bradybaeninae Pilsbry, 1934 (1898)
  - tribe Bradybaenini Pilsbry, 1934 (1898) [= Eulotidae Möllendorff, 1898; = Fruticicolinae Kobelt, 1904; = Buliminopsinae Hoffmann, 1928]
  - tribe Aegistini Kuroda & Habe, 1949
  - tribe Euhadrini Habe, Okutani & Nishiwaki, 1994
- Hadrinae Iredale, 1937 [= Xanthomelontidae Iredale, 1937; = Rhagadidae Iredale, 1938; = Chloritidae Iredale, 1938; = Papuinidae Iredale, 1938; = Calyciidae Iredale, 1941; = Planispiridae Iredale, 1941; = Sinumeloninae Solem, 1992; = Cristovalinae Schileyko, 2003]
- Helicostylinae Ihering, 1909378 [= Pfeifferiinae Gray, 1855; = Cochlostylidae Möllendorff, 1890]

As of March 2023, WoRMS accepts four subfamilies:

- Bradybaeninae Pilsbry, 1895
- Camaeninae Iredale, 1937
- Hadrinae Iredale, 1937
- Helicostylinae Ihering, 1909 (1890)

=== Genera ===
The following genera are accepted in the Camaenidae:

Genera not placed in a subfamily:

- Indocamaena Thach, 2023
- Kenyirus Clements & Tan, 2012
- Ogeramua Christensen, 2017
- Philbouchetia Thach, 2020
- Sinocamaena M. Wu, 2024

Subfamily Bradybaeninae Pilsbry, 1934 (1898):

- Tribe Aegistini Kuroda & Habe, 1949
  - Aegista Albers, 1850
  - Aegistohadra M. Wu, 2004
  - Coelorus Pilsbry, 1900
  - Dolicheulota Pilsbry, 1901
  - Guamampa Schileyko, 1997
  - Landouria Godwin-Austen, 1918
  - Lepidopisum Kuroda & Habe, 1958
  - Mandarina Pilsbry, 1895
  - Mastigeulota Pilsbry, 1895
  - Miyakoia Minato, 1980
  - Neoaegista Azuma, 1955
  - Neochloritis Minato, 1982
  - Nesiohelix Kuroda & Emura, 1943
  - Nipponochloritis Habe, 1955
  - Pancala Kuroda & Habe, 1949
  - Plecteulota Möllendorff, 1892
  - Plectotropis E. von Martens, 1860
  - Pseudaspasita Möllendorff, 1901
  - Satsuma A. Adams, 1868
  - Takasagohadra Kuroda, 1941
  - Torobaena F. Haas, 1935
  - Tricheulota Pilsbry, 1895
  - Trishoplita Jacobi, 1898
  - Yakuchloritis Habe, 1955
- Tribe Euhadrini Habe, Okutani & Nishiwaki, 1994
  - Euhadra Pilsbry, 1890
- Tribe Bradybaenini Pilsbry, 1934
  - Acusta E. von Martens, 1860
  - Ainohelix Kuroda & Taki, 1933
  - Apatetes Gude, 1914
  - Armandiella Ancey, 1901
  - Bradybaena H. Beck, 1837
  - Buliminidius Heude, 1890
  - Cathaica Moellendorff, 1884
  - Chosenelix Pilsbry, 1927
  - Coccoglypta Pilsbry, 1895
  - Ezohelix Kuroda & Emura, 1938
  - Fruticicola Held, 1838
  - Grabauia Yen, 1935
  - Karaftohelix Pilsbry, 1927
  - Kugitangia Schileyko, Pazilov & Abdulazizova, 2017
  - Laeocathaica Moellendorff, 1899
  - Metodontia Möllendorff, 1886
  - Mikiria Godwin-Austen, 1918
  - Neofruticicola Schileyko, Pazilov & Abdulazizova, 2020
  - Neseulota Ehrmann, 1911
  - Paraegista Kuroda & Azuma, 1951
  - Phaeohelix Kuroda & Habe, 1949
  - Platypetasus Pilsbry, 1895
  - Pliocathaica Andreae, 1900
  - Ponsadenia Schileyko, 1978
  - Pseudiberus Ancey, 1887
  - Pseudobuliminus Gredler, 1886
  - Rudens Heude, 1890
  - Secusana Gredler, 1894
  - Semibuliminus Möllendorff, 1899
  - Stenogyropsis Möllendorff, 1899
  - Stilpnodiscus Möllendorff, 1899
  - Trichobradybaena M. Wu & J.-Y. Guo, 2003
  - Trichocathaica Gude, 1919
- Genera not placed to tribe:
  - Eueuhadra M. Wu, 2004
  - Jiaoliaous G. Zhang, 2024
  - Sinochloritis M. Wu & Z.-Y. Chen, 2019
  - Sinorachis M. Wu & Z.-Y. Chen, 2019
  - Traumatophora Ancey, 1887

Subfamily Camaeninae:

- Albersia H. Adams, 1865
- Amphicoelina Zilch, 1960
- Amphidromus Albers, 1850
- Anceyoconcha S. Tumpeesuwan & C. Tumpeesuwan, 2020
- Beddomea G. Nevill, 1878
- Bellatrachia Schileyko, 2018
- Bouchetcamaena Thach, 2018
- Burmochloritis Godwin-Austen, 1920
- Camaena Albers, 1850
- Camaenella Pilsbry, 1893
- Cryptaegis W. F. Clapp, 1923
- Dentichloritis Páll-Gergely & Neubert, 2019
- Discoconcha I. Rensch, 1935
- Disteustoma Iredale, 1941
- Dorcasidea Iredale, 1941
- Entadella Páll-Gergely & Hunyadi, 2016
- Ganesella W. T. Blanford, 1863
- Gemitelix Iredale, 1941
- Globotrochus F. Haas, 1935
- Kendallena Iredale, 1941
- Mecyntera Iredale, 1941
- Moellendorffia Ancey, 1887
- Moellendorffiella Pilsbry, 1905
- Neocepolis Pilsbry, 1891
- Neotrachia Schileyko, 2018
- Obba H. Beck, 1837
- Obbiberus F. Haas, 1935
- Oreobba Pilsbry, 1894
- Pseudobba Möllendorff, 1891
- Pseudopartula L. Pfeiffer, 1856
- Pseudostegodera M. Wu & Z.-Y. Chen, 2021
- Pseudotrachia Schileyko, 2018
- Rhytidoconcha I. Rensch, 1933
- Stegodera E. von Martens, 1876
- Trachia E. von Martens, 1860
- Trachychloritis F. Haas, 1934
- Tradeustoma Iredale, 1941
- Trichelix Ancey, 1887
- Trichochloritis Pilsbry, 1891
- Vulnus Sykes, 1904

Subfamily Hadrinae:

- Adclarkia J. Stanisic, 1996
- Aetholitis J. Stanisic, 2010
- Amplirhagada Iredale, 1933
- Ariophantopsis B. Rensch, 1930
- Arnemelassa Köhler & Bouchet, 2020
- Arnhemtrachia Köhler & Criscione, 2013
- Aslintesta Solem, 1992
- Australocosmica Köhler, 2011
- Austrocamaena J. Stanisic, 2010
- Austrochloritis Pilsbry, 1891
- Basedowena Iredale, 1937
- Baudinella Thiele, 1931
- Bentosites Iredale, 1933
- Billordia J. Stanisic, 2010
- Boriogenia J. Stanisic, 2010
- Brigaladra L. Stanisic, 2022
- Calvigenia Iredale, 1938
- Calycia H. Adams, 1865
- Canefriula Iredale, 1941
- Caperantrum Solem, 1997
- Cardiotrachia Criscione & Köhler, 2014
- Carinotrachia Solem, 1985
- Catellotrachia Iredale, 1933
- Chloritis H. Beck, 1837
- Chloritisanax Iredale, 1933
- Chloritobadistes Iredale, 1933
- Claudettea Iredale, 1941
- Coliolus Tapparone Canefri, 1886
- Contramelon Iredale, 1937
- Cooperconcha Solem, 1992
- Crikey J. Stanisic, 2009
- Cristigibba Tapparone Canefri, 1883
- Cristilabrum Solem, 1981
- Crookshanksia J. Stanisic, 2010
- Crystallopsis Ancey, 1887
- Cupedora Iredale, 1937
- Damochlora Iredale, 1938
- Denhamiana J. Stanisic, 2013
- Dirutrachia Iredale, 1937
- Discomelon Iredale, 1938
- Divellomelon Iredale, 1933
- Euryladra L. Stanisic, 2022
- Eurytrachia J. Stanisic, 2010
- Exiligada Iredale, 1939
- Falspleuroxia Solem, 1997
- Figuladra Köhler & Bouchet, 2020
- Forcartia Clench & R. D. Turner, 1963
- Forrestena J. Stanisic, 2010
- Galadistes Iredale, 1938
- Globorhagada Iredale, 1933
- Gloreugenia Iredale, 1933
- Glyptorhagada Pilsbry, 1890
- Gnarosophia Iredale, 1933
- Granulomelon Iredale, 1933
- Hadra E. von Martens, 1860
- Jacksonena Iredale, 1937
- Jimbouria J. Stanisic, 2010
- Kandoschloritis Shea & O. L. Griffiths, 2010
- Kendrickia Solem, 1985
- Kimberleydiscus Köhler, 2010
- Kimberleymelon Köhler, 2010
- Kimberleytrachia Köhler, 2011
- Kimboraga Iredale, 1939
- Kymatobaudinia Criscione & Köhler, 2013
- Lacustrelix Iredale, 1937
- Lamprellia J. Stanisic, 2010
- Letitia Iredale, 1941
- Lorelliana J. Stanisic, 2016
- Lynfergusonia J. Stanisic, 2010
- Marilynessa J. Stanisic, 2010
- Megalacron I. Rensch, 1934
- Meliobba Iredale, 1940
- Melostrachia Iredale, 1938
- Meridistes J. Stanisic, 2010
- Meridolum Iredale, 1933
- Mesodontrachia Solem, 1985
- Micromelon Solem, 1992
- Molema Köhler, 2011
- Montanomelon Solem, 1993
- Monteithosites J. Stanisic, 1996
- Moretonistes J. Stanisic, 2010
- Mouldingia Solem, 1984
- Mussonena Iredale, 1938
- Nannochlora Criscione & Köhler, 2015
- Nannochloritis Köhler & Bouchet, 2020
- Nanotrachia Köhler & Criscione, 2013
- Neveritis Iredale, 1938
- Ningbingia Solem, 1981
- Noctepuna Iredale, 1933
- Nodulabium Criscione & Köhler, 2013
- Obsteugenia Iredale, 1933
- Offachloritis Iredale, 1933
- Ordtrachia Solem, 1984
- Ototrachia Criscione & Köhler, 2013
- Pallidelix Iredale, 1933
- Papuexul Iredale, 1933
- Papuina E. von Martens, 1860
- Papuolus Schileyko, 2003
- Papustyla Pilsbry, 1893
- Parachloritis Ehrmann, 1912
- Parglogenia Iredale, 1938
- Patrubella Iredale, 1938
- Perioinsolita J. Stanisic & Potter, 2010
- Petraconcha S. A. Clark, 2009
- Planispira H. Beck, 1837
- Plectorhagada Iredale, 1933
- Pleuroxia Ancey, 1887
- Pommerhelix S. A. Clark, 2009
- Ponderconcha S. A. Clark, 2009
- Posorites Iredale, 1933
- Promonturconchum Solem, 1997
- Protolinitis J. Stanisic, 2010
- Prototrachia Solem, 1984
- Prymnbriareus Solem, 1981
- Pseudcupedora Solem, 1992
- Pseudodistes J. Stanisic & Potter, 2010
- Pseudomesodontrachia Criscione & Köhler, 2013
- Pseudopapuina F. Haas, 1934
- Quirosena Iredale, 1941
- Quistrachia Iredale, 1939
- Rachita Criscione & Köhler, 2014
- Ramogenia Iredale, 1938
- Retroterra Solem, 1985
- Rhagada E. von Martens, 1860
- Rhynchotrochus Möllendorff, 1895
- Sauroconcha W.-H. Zhang & Shea, 2008
- Setobaudinia Iredale, 1933
- Setocallosa Criscione & Köhler, 2015
- Sinumelon Iredale, 1930
- Solmogada Iredale, 1941
- Sphaerospira Mörch, 1867
- Spurlingia Iredale, 1933
- Squamagenia J. Stanisic & Potter, 2010
- Stanisicia S. A. Clark, 2009
- Steorra J. Stanisic, 2010
- Strepsitaurus Solem, 1997
- Succochlea Criscione & Köhler, 2014
- Sulcobasis Tapparone Canefri, 1883
- Tatemelon Solem, 1993
- Temporena Iredale, 1933
- Thersites L. Pfeiffer, 1855
- Tolgachloritis Iredale, 1933
- Toombatrachia J. Stanisic, 2010
- Torresitrachia Iredale, 1939
- Trachiopsis Pilsbry, 1893
- Trachygenia J. Stanisic, 2010
- Trozena Iredale, 1938
- Turgenitubulus Solem, 1981
- Ventopelita Iredale, 1933
- Vidumelon Iredale, 1933
- Vincentrachia Criscione & Köhler, 2013
- Wahgia Clench & R. D. Turner, 1959
- Westraltrachia Iredale, 1933
- Xanthomelon E. von Martens, 1860
- Xeromelon Criscione & Köhler, 2016
- Youwanjela Köhler & Shea, 2012
- Zyghelix Iredale, 1937

Subfamily Helicostylinae:

- Anixa Pilsbry, 1895
- Calocochlea W. Hartmann, 1843
- Chloraea Albers, 1850
- Chrysallis Albers, 1850
- Cochlodryas E. von Martens, 1860
- Cochlostyla A. Férussac, 1821
- Dolichostyla Pilsbry, 1896
- Helicobulinus Broderip, 1841
- Helicostyla A. Férussac, 1821
- Hypselostyla L. Pfeiffer, 1868
- Leytia Pilsbry, 1892
- Mesanella Clench & R. D. Turner, 1952
- Orthostylus H. Beck, 1837
- Orustia Mörch, 1852
- Pachya Albers, 1850
- Pachysphaera Pilsbry, 1892
- Pfeifferia J. E. Gray, 1853
- Phengus Albers, 1850
- Phoenicobius Mörch, 1852
- Pyrochilus Pilsbry, 1893
- Trachystyla Pilsbry, 1892
