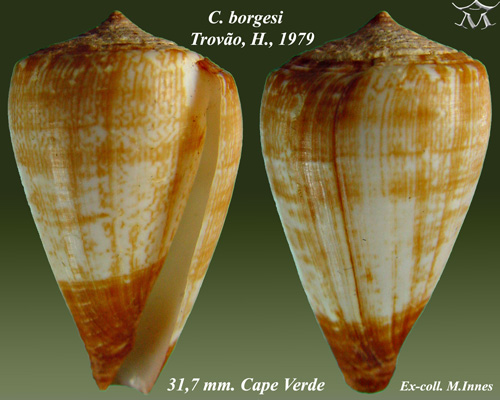
- Apertural and abapertural views of shell of Conus borgesi Trovão, 1979

Scientific classification
- Kingdom: Animalia
- Phylum: Mollusca
- Class: Gastropoda
- Subclass: Caenogastropoda
- Order: Neogastropoda
- Family: Conidae
- Genus: Africonus; Petuch, 1975

Type species
- Conus cuneolus Reeve, 1843

Synonyms
- Afroconus Petuch, 1975

= Africonus =

Subgenus of gastropods

Africonus is a taxon of sea snails, marine gastropod mollusks in the family Conidae. Although originally described as a distinct subgenus, it is currently considered as an alternative representation of the cone snail genus, Conus.

== Distinguishing characteristics ==
The Tucker & Tenorio 2009 taxonomy distinguishes Africonus from Conus in the following ways:

- Genus Conus sensu stricto Linnaeus, 1758

Shell characters (living and fossil species)

The basic shell shape is conical to elongated conical, has a deep anal notch on the shoulder, a smooth periostracum and a small operculum. The shoulder of the shell is usually nodulose and the protoconch is usually multispiral. Markings often include the presence of tents except for black or white color variants, with the absence of spiral lines of minute tents and textile bars.

Radular tooth (not known for fossil species)

The radula has an elongated anterior section with serrations and a large exposed terminating cusp, a non-obvious waist, blade is either small or absent and has a short barb, and lacks a basal spur.

Geographical distribution

These species are found in the Indo-Pacific region.

Feeding habits

These species eat other gastropods including cones.

- Subgenus Africonus Petuch, 1975

Shell characters (living and fossil species)

The protoconch is paucispiral, the whorl tops may be concave when viewed in cross section, with cords on the whorl tops that may be lost in middle spire whorls or persist thereafter. The shell has a shallow to moderately deep anal notch. The periostracum is smooth and thin, and the operculum is small.

Radular tooth (not known for fossil species)

The anterior section of the radula is usually shorter than the posterior section but in some species they are subequal in length, the lumen of the radular tooth is wide, a basal spur is present, the barb is short, and the blade is long and extends along most of the anterior section of the radular tooth. Serrations are usually in multiple rows with one or two rows of large serrations and rows of smaller serrations on either side, although serrations can be in a single row in juveniles or small specimens.

Geographical distribution

These species are endemic to the Cape Verde Islands in the West African Region.

Feeding habits

These species are vermivorous (meaning that they prey on marine worms).

== Species ==
Prior to 2009, all species within the family Conidae were placed in one genus, Conus. In 2009 however, J.K. Tucker and M.J. Tenorio proposed a classification system for the over 600 recognized species that were in the family. Their classification proposed 3 distinct families and 82 genera for the living species of cone snails. This classification was based upon shell morphology, radular differences, anatomy, physiology, cladistics, with comparisons to molecular (DNA) studies. Published accounts of genera within the Conidae that include the genus Africonus include J.K. Tucker & M.J. Tenorio (2009), and Bouchet et al. (2011).

Testing in order to try to understand the molecular phylogeny of the Conidae was initially begun by Christopher Meyer and Alan Kohn, and is continuing, particularly with the advent of nuclear DNA testing in addition to mDNA testing.

Many authorities continue to use the traditional classification, where all species are placed in Conus within the single family Conidae including the current (October 2022) version of the World Register of Marine Species. The binomial names of species in the 82 cone snail genera listed in Tucker & Tenorio 2009 are currently recognized by the World Register of Marine Species as "alternative representations". Debate within the scientific community regarding this issue continues, and additional molecular phylogeny studies are being carried out in an attempt to clarify the issue.

In 2015, in the Journal of Molluscan Studies, Puillandre, Duda, Meyer, Olivera & Bouchet presented a new classification for the old genus Conus. Using 329 species, the authors carried out molecular phylogenetic analyses. The results suggested that the authors should place all cone snails in a single family, Conidae, containing four genera: Conus, Conasprella, Profundiconus and Californiconus. The authors group 85% of all known cone snail species under Conus, They recognize 57 subgenera within Conus, and 11 subgenera within the genus Conasprella. In this description of the family Conidae, Africonus is classified as a subgenus of Conus: Conus (Lautoconus) Monterosato, 1923 (type species: Conus mediterraneus Hwass in Bruguière, 1792) represented as Conus Thiele, 1929

All the species formerly classified in the genus Africonus are now considered as "alternate representations" of species in the genus Conus:

- Africonus antoniaensis Cossignani & Fiadeiro, 2014: synonym of Conus antoniaensis (Cossignani & Fiadeiro, 2014)
- Africonus antoniomonteiroi (Rolán, 1990): synonym of Conus antoniomonteiroi Rolán, 1990
- Africonus bellulus (Rolán, 1990): synonym of Conus bellulus Rolán, 1990
- Africonus boavistensis (Rolán & F. Fernandes, 1990): synonym of Conus Rolán & F. Fernandes, 1990
- Africonus borgesi (Trovão, 1979): synonym of Conus borgesi Trovão, 1979
- Africonus calhetae (Rolán, 1990): synonym of Conus calhetae Rolán, 1990
- Africonus crotchii (Reeve, 1849): synonym of Conus crotchii Reeve, 1849
- Africonus cuneolus (Reeve, 1843): synonym of Conus cuneolus Reeve, 1843
- Africonus curralensis (Rolán, 1986): synonym of Conus curralensis Rolán, 1986
- Africonus damottai (Trovão, 1979): synonym of Conus damottai Trovão, 1979
- Africonus decoratus (Röckel, Rolán & Monteiro, 1980): synonym of Conus decoratus Röckel, Rolán & Monteiro, 1980
- Africonus delanoyae (Trovão, 1979): synonym of Conus delanoyae Trovão, 1979
- Africonus denizi Afonso & Tenorio, 2011: synonym of Conus denizi (Afonso & Tenorio, 2011)
- Africonus espingueirensis T. Cossignani & Fiadeiro, 2017: synonym of Conus docensis (Cossignani & Fiadeiro, 2017)
- Africonus felitae (Rolán, 1990): synonym of Conus felitae Rolán, 1990
- Africonus fernandesi (Tenorio, Afonso & Rolán, 2008): synonym of Conus fernandesi Tenorio, Afonso & Rolán, 2008
- Africonus freitasi Tenorio, et al., 2018: synonym of Conus freitasi (Tenorio, et al., 2018)
- Africonus furnae (Rolán, 1990): synonym of Conus furnae Rolán, 1990
- Africonus fuscoflavus (Röckel, Rolán & Monteiro, 1980): synonym of Conus fuscoflavus Röckel, Rolán & Monteiro, 1980
- Africonus galeao (Rolán, 1990): synonym of Conus galeao Rolán, 1990
- Africonus gonsaloi Afonso & Tenorio, 2014: synonym of Conus gonsaloi (Afonso & Tenorio, 2014)
- Africonus grahami (Röckel, Cosel & Burnay, 1980): synonym of Conus grahami Röckel, Cosel & Burnay, 1980
- Africonus infinitus (Rolán, 1990): synonym of Conus infinitus Rolán, 1990
- Africonus insulae Tenorio, et al., 2018: synonym of Conus insulae (Tenorio, et al., 2018)
- Africonus isabelarum (Tenorio & Afonso, 2004): synonym of Conus isabelarum Tenorio & Afonso, 2004
- Africonus josephinae (Rolán, 1980): synonym of Conus josephinae Rolán, 1980
- Africonus kersteni (Tenorio, Afonso & Rolán, 2008): synonym of Conus kersteni Tenorio, Afonso & Rolán, 2008
- Africonus longilineus (Röckel, Rolán & Monteiro, 1980): synonym of Conus longilineus Röckel, Rolán & Monteiro, 1980
- Africonus lugubris (Reeve, 1849): synonym of Conus lugubris Reeve, 1849
- Africonus maioensis (Trovão, Rolán & Félix-Alves, 1990): synonym of Conus maioensis Trovão, Rolán & Félix-Alves, 1990
- Africonus miruchae (Röckel, Rolán & Monteiro, 1980): synonym of Conus miruchae Röckel, Rolán & Monteiro, 1980
- Africonus navarroi (Rolán, 1986): synonym of Conus navarroi Rolán, 1986
- Africonus perrineae T. Cossignani & Fiadeiro, 2018: synonym of Conus perrineae (T. Cossignani & Fiadeiro, 2018)
- Africonus raulsilvai (Rolán, Monteiro & Fernandes, 1998): synonym of Conus raulsilvai Rolán, Monteiro & Fernandes, 1998
- Africonus regonae (Rolán & Trovão, 1990): synonym of Conus regonae Rolán & Trovão, 1990
- Africonus roeckeli (Rolán, 1980): synonym of Conus roeckeli Rolán, 1980
- Africonus salletae Cossignani, 2014: synonym of Conus salletae (Cossignani, 2014)
- Africonus santaluziensis T. Cossignani & Fiadeiro, 2015: synonym of Conus santaluziensis (T. Cossignani & Fiadeiro, 2015)
- Africonus santanaensis Afonso & Tenorio, 2014: synonym of Conus santanaensis (Afonso & Tenorio, 2014)
- Africonus saragasae (Rolán, 1986): synonym of Conus saragasae Rolán, 1986
- Africonus verdensis (Trovão, 1979): synonym of Conus verdensis Trovão, 1979
- Africonus vulcanus (Tenorio & Afonso, 2004): synonym of Conus vulcanus Tenorio & Afonso, 2004

Species brought into synonymy

The following species were synonymized:

- Africonus angeluquei Tenorio, Abalde & Zardoya, 2018 accepted as Africonus perrineae T. Cossignani & Fiadeiro, 2018
- Africonus anthonyi Petuch, 1975 accepted as Africonus cuneolus (Reeve, 1843)
- Africonus antonioi T. Cossignani, 2014 accepted as Africonus crotchii (Reeve, 1849)
- Africonus barrosensis T. Cossignani & Fiadeiro, 2017 accepted as Africonus boavistensis (Rolán & F. Fernandes, 1990)
- Africonus bernardinoi T. Cossignani, 2014 accepted as Africonus cuneolus (Reeve, 1843)
- Africonus cabraloi T. Cossignani, 2014 accepted as Africonus crotchii (Reeve, 1849)
- Africonus cagarralensis T. Cossignani, 2014 accepted as Africonus longilineus (Röckel, Rolán & Monteiro, 1980)
- Africonus calhetinensis T. Cossignani & Fiadeiro, 2014 accepted as Africonus crotchii (Reeve, 1849)
- Africonus cazalisoi T. Cossignani & Fiadeiro, 2018 accepted as Kalloconus trochulus (Reeve, 1844)
- Africonus claudiae (Tenorio & Afonso, 2004) accepted as Africonus galeao (Rolán, 1990)
- Africonus condei Afonso & Tenorio, 2014 accepted as Africonus crotchii (Reeve, 1849)
- Africonus cossignanii T. Cossignani & Fiadeiro, 2014 accepted as Africonus maioensis (Trovão, Rolán & Félix-Alves, 1990)
- Africonus crioulus (Tenorio & Afonso, 2004) accepted as Africonus maioensis (Trovão, Rolán & Félix-Alves, 1990)
- Africonus cristinapessoae T. Cossignani & Fiadeiro, 2017 accepted as Africonus fuscoflavus (Röckel, Rolán & Monteiro, 1980)
- Africonus damioi T. Cossignani & Fiadeiro, 2015 accepted as Africonus roeckeli (Rolán, 1980)
- Africonus decolrobertoi T. Cossignani & Fiadeiro, 2017 accepted as Africonus maioensis (Trovão, Rolán & Félix-Alves, 1990)
- Africonus demisgeraldoi T. Cossignani & Fiadeiro, 2018 accepted as Africonus josephinae (Rolán, 1980)
- Africonus derrubado (Rolán & F. Fernandes, 1990) accepted as Africonus damottai (Trovão, 1979)
- Africonus diegoi T. Cossignani, 2014 accepted as Africonus damottai (Trovão, 1979)
- Africonus diminutus (Trovão & Rolán, 1986) accepted as Conus diminutus Trovão & Rolán, 1986
- Africonus docensis T. Cossignani & Fiadeiro, 2014 accepted as Africonus crotchii (Reeve, 1849)
- Africonus echinophilus Petuch, 1975 accepted as Conus echinophilus (Petuch, 1975)
- Africonus evorai (Monteiro, C. Fernandes & Rolán, 1995) accepted as Africonus crotchii (Reeve, 1849)
- Africonus fantasmalis (Rolán, 1990) accepted as Africonus fuscoflavus (Röckel, Rolán & Monteiro, 1980)
- Africonus fiadeiroi Tenorio, Afonso, R. Cunha & Rolán, 2014 accepted as Africonus crotchii (Reeve, 1849)
- Africonus fontonae (Rolán & Trovão, 1990) accepted as Africonus cuneolus (Reeve, 1843)
- Africonus gallopalvoi T. Cossignani & Fiadeiro, 2017 accepted as Africonus fuscoflavus (Röckel, Rolán & Monteiro, 1980)
- Africonus gonsalensis T. Cossignani & Fiadeiro, 2014 accepted as Africonus santanaensis Afonso & Tenorio, 2014
- Africonus guiandradoi T. Cossignani & Fiadeiro, 2017 accepted as Africonus josephinae (Rolán, 1980)
- Africonus irregularis (G. B. Sowerby II, 1858) accepted as Africonus crotchii (Reeve, 1849)
- Africonus josegeraldoi T. Cossignani & Fiadeiro, 2018 accepted as Africonus crotchii (Reeve, 1849)
- Africonus joserochoi T. Cossignani, 2014 accepted as Africonus delanoyae (Trovão, 1979)
- Africonus luquei (Rolán & Trovão, 1990) accepted as Africonus delanoyae (Trovão, 1979)
- Africonus marckeppensi T. Cossignani & Fiadeiro, 2017 accepted as Africonus josephinae (Rolán, 1980)
- Africonus marcocastellazzii T. Cossignani & Fiadeiro, 2014 accepted as Africonus maioensis (Trovão, Rolán & Félix-Alves, 1990)
- Africonus melissae (Tenorio, Afonso & Rolán, 2008) accepted as Africonus longilineus (Röckel, Rolán & Monteiro, 1980)
- Africonus messiasi (Rolán & F. Fernandes, 1990) accepted as Africonus fuscoflavus (Röckel, Rolán & Monteiro, 1980)
- Africonus miguelfiaderoi T. Cossignani & Fiadeiro, 2015 accepted as Africonus vulcanus (Tenorio & Afonso, 2004)
- Africonus minimus T. Cossignani & Fiadeiro, 2015 accepted as Africonus longilineus (Röckel, Rolán & Monteiro, 1980)
- Africonus mordeirae (Rolán & Trovão, 1990) accepted as Africonus cuneolus (Reeve, 1843)
- Africonus morroensis T. Cossignani & Fiadeiro, 2014 accepted as Africonus diminutus (Trovão & Rolán, 1986)
- Africonus nelsonandradoi T. Cossignani & Fiadeiro, 2015 accepted as Africonus longilineus (Röckel, Rolán & Monteiro, 1980)
- Africonus nelsontiagoi T. Cossignani & Fiadeiro, 2014 accepted as Africonus verdensis (Trovão, 1979)
- Africonus padarosae T. Cossignani & Fiadeiro, 2018 accepted as Africonus antoniaensis T. Cossignani & Fiadeiro, 2014
- Africonus pedrofiadeiroi T. Cossignani & Fiadeiro, 2015 accepted as Africonus borgesi (Trovão, 1979)
- Africonus pinedensis T. Cossignani & Fiadeiro, 2017 accepted as Africonus damottai (Trovão, 1979)
- Africonus pseudocuneolus (Röckel, Rolán & Monteiro, 1980) accepted as Africonus cuneolus (Reeve, 1843)
- Africonus purvisi T. Cossignani & Fiadeiro, 2017 accepted as Africonus damottai (Trovão, 1979)
- Africonus roquensis T. Cossignani & Fiadeiro, 2015 accepted as Africonus damottai (Trovão, 1979)
- Africonus salreiensis (Rolán, 1980) accepted as Africonus crotchii (Reeve, 1849)
- Africonus serranegrae (Rolán, 1990) accepted as Africonus cuneolus (Reeve, 1843)
- Africonus silviae T. Cossignani, 2014 accepted as Africonus fuscoflavus (Röckel, Rolán & Monteiro, 1980)
- Africonus swinneni Tenorio, Afonso, R. Cunha & Rolán, 2014 accepted as Africonus delanoyae (Trovão, 1979)
- Africonus tarafensis T. Cossignani & Fiadeiro, 2018 accepted as Africonus fuscoflavus (Röckel, Rolán & Monteiro, 1980)
- Africonus teodorae (Rolán & F. Fernandes, 1990) accepted as Africonus crotchii (Reeve, 1849)
- Africonus umbelinae T. Cossignani & Fiadeiro, 2014 accepted as Africonus damottai (Trovão, 1979)
- Africonus varandinhensis T. Cossignani & Fiadeiro, 2017 accepted as Africonus boavistensis (Rolán & F. Fernandes, 1990)
- Africonus wandae T. Cossignani, 2014 accepted as Africonus borgesi (Trovão, 1979)
- Africonus zinhoi T. Cossignani, 2014 accepted as Africonus maioensis (Trovão, Rolán & Félix-Alves, 1990)
