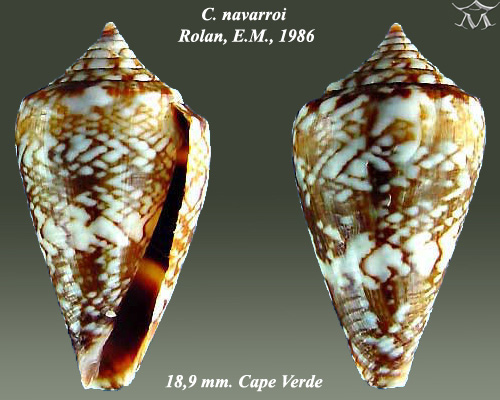
- Apertural and abapertural views of shell of Conus navarroi , E.M., 1986
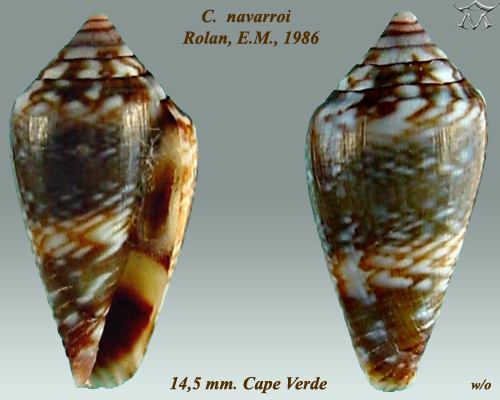

Conservation status
- Near Threatened (IUCN 3.1)

Scientific classification
- Kingdom: Animalia
- Phylum: Mollusca
- Class: Gastropoda
- Subclass: Caenogastropoda
- Order: Neogastropoda
- Superfamily: Conoidea
- Family: Conidae
- Genus: Conus
- Species: C. navarroi

Binomial name
- Conus navarroi Rolán, 1986

Synonyms
- Africonus navarroi (Rolán, 1986); Conus (Lautoconus) navarroi , 1986 · accepted, alternate representation

= Conus navarroi =

Species of sea snail

Conus navarroi is a species of predatory sea snail, a marine gastropod mollusk in the family Conidae, the cone snails and their allies.

Like all species within the genus Conus, these snails are predatory and venomous. They are capable of stinging humans, therefore live ones should be handled carefully or not at all. From its morphology and radular characters, it seems an evolutionary line different from other Capeverdian Conus species.

The former subspecies Conus navarroi calhetae , 1990 is a synonym of Conus calhetae , 1990.

== Description ==
The size of the shell varies between 14 mm and 23 mm.

== Distribution ==
This species occurs in the Atlantic Ocean off the islands Santa Luzia and São Vicente, Cape Verde.
