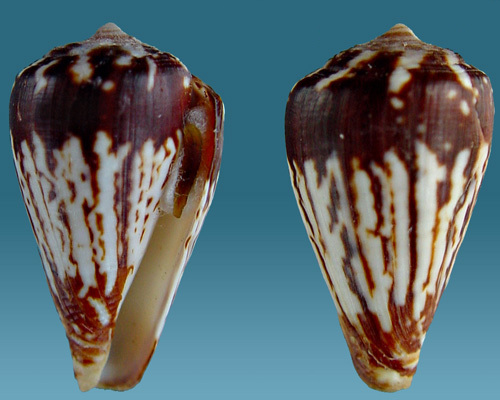
- Apertural and abapertural views of shell of Conus verdensis Trovco, H., 1979
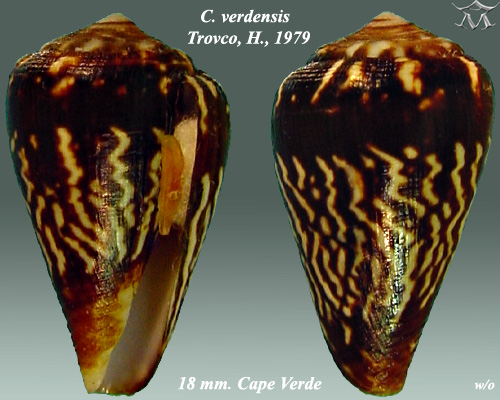

Conservation status
- Least Concern (IUCN 3.1)

Scientific classification
- Kingdom: Animalia
- Phylum: Mollusca
- Class: Gastropoda
- Subclass: Caenogastropoda
- Order: Neogastropoda
- Superfamily: Conoidea
- Family: Conidae
- Genus: Conus
- Species: C. verdensis

Binomial name
- Conus verdensis Trovão, 1979

Synonyms
- Africonus verdensis (Trovão, 1979); Africonus verdensis verdensis (Trovão, 1979); Conus nelsontiagoi (Cossignani & Fiadeiro, 2014); Conus verdensis verdensis Trovão, 1979; Conus (Lautoconus) verdensis Trovão, 1979 - accepted, alternate representation

= Conus verdensis =

Species of sea snail

Conus verdensis is a species of sea snail, a marine gastropod mollusk in the family Conidae, the cone snails and their allies.

Like all species within the genus Conus, these cone snails are predatory and venomous. They are capable of stinging humans, therefore live ones should be handled carefully or not at all.

The subspecies Conus verdensis furnae Rolán, 1990 has been raised to the status of species as Conus furnae Rolán, 1990.

== Description ==
The size of the shell varies between 13 mm and 23 mm.

== Distribution ==
This species occurs in the Atlantic Ocean off the northwest coast of the island of Santiago, Cape Verde.
