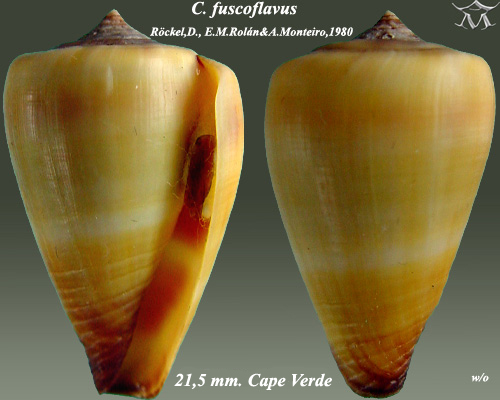
- Apertural and abapertural views of shell of Conus fuscoflavus Röckel, Rolán, & Monteiro, 1980
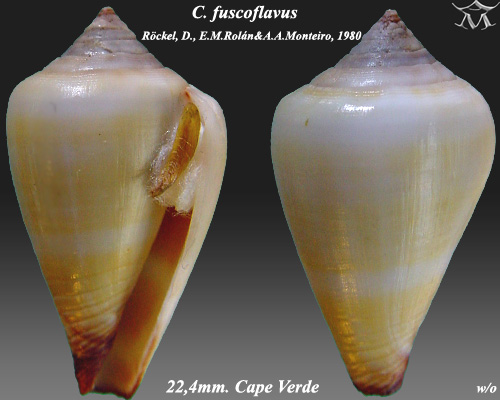

Conservation status
- Least Concern (IUCN 3.1)

Scientific classification
- Kingdom: Animalia
- Phylum: Mollusca
- Class: Gastropoda
- Subclass: Caenogastropoda
- Order: Neogastropoda
- Superfamily: Conoidea
- Family: Conidae
- Genus: Conus
- Species: C. fuscoflavus

Binomial name
- Conus fuscoflavus Röckel, Rolán, & Monteiro, 1980

Synonyms
- Africonus cristinapessoae Cossignani & Fiadeiro, 2017; Africonus fantasmalis (Rolán, 1990); Africonus fuscoflavus (Röckel, Rolán & Monteiro, 1980); Africonus gallopalvoi Cossignani & Fiadeiro, 2017; Africonus messiasi (Rolán & F. Fernandes, 1990); Africonus silviae Cossignani, 2014; Africonus tarafensis Cossignani & Fiadeiro, 2018; Conus (Lautoconus) fantasmalis Rolán, 1990; Conus (Lautoconus) fuscoflavus Röckel, Rolán & Monteiro, 1980· accepted, alternate representation; Conus (Lautoconus) messiasi Rolán & F. Fernandes, 1990; Conus (Lautoconus) silviae (Cossignani, 2014); Conus fantasmalis Rolán, 1990; Conus messiasi Rolán & Fernandes, 1990; Conus silviae (Cossignani, 2014)

= Conus fuscoflavus =

Species of sea snail

Conus fuscoflavus is a species of sea snail, a marine gastropod mollusk in the family Conidae, the cone snails and their allies, endemic to the Cape Verdes. It was first described by Röckel et al. in 1980. Like all species within the genus Conus, these snails are predatory and venomous. They are capable of stinging humans, therefore live specimens should be handled carefully or not at all. Cone snails are distinguished by the obconic shaped shell, hence the name.

== Description ==
The length of an adult shell varies greatly, with specimens ranging in size from 15 mm to 28 mm (0.6 to 1.1 in).

The corneous shell of C. fuscoflavus is smooth and thick; indistinct suture; protoconch and spire composing a fraction of the shell length. The majority of the shell is dominated by the body whorl; the aperture elongated but narrow, the length of the body whorl, and is truncated at the base. The operculum is small relative to the overall length of the shell. No inner lip; thick outer lip.

Shell colour varies but is generally beige or tan with white horizontal bands of colour.

== Distribution ==
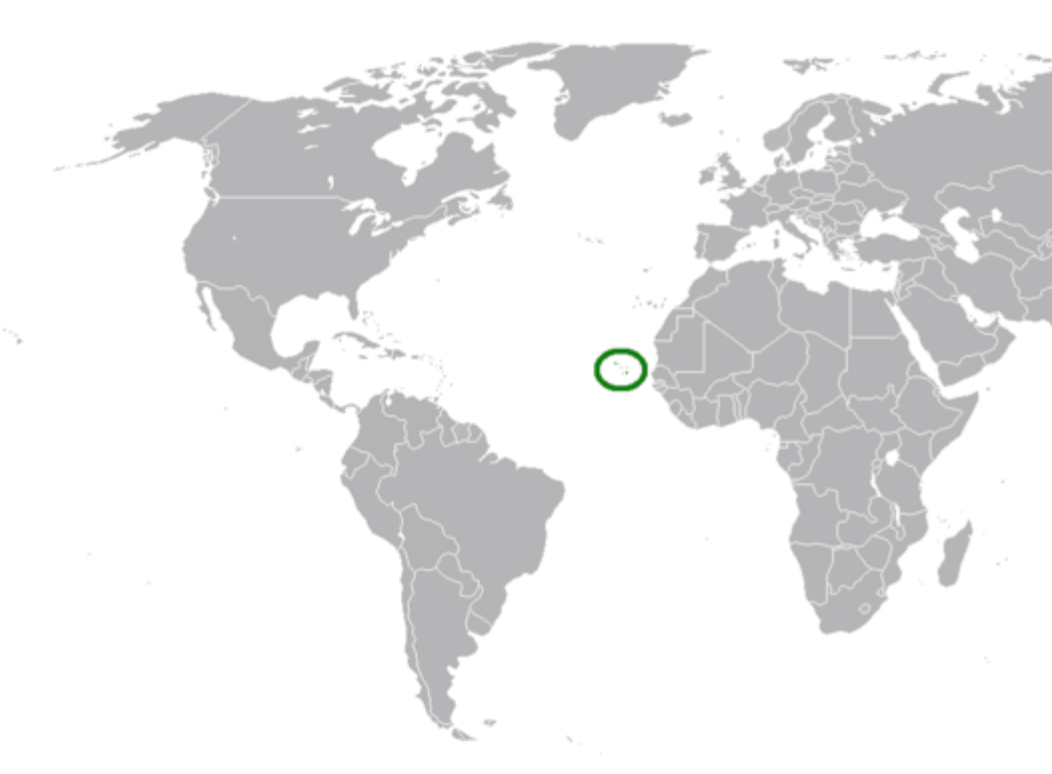
Cape Verdes on map

This marine gastropod species is found only in the Atlantic Ocean off the Cape Verdes.

The type locality is contained in Bao Vista, Cape Verdes.

Not much is known about the habitat of C. fuscoflavus, or the depth at which it inhabits, however Conus sp. are known to inhabit depths ranging from the sublittoral (c. 200 m) to 1,000 m (656 to 3,280 ft).

== See also ==
- Cone snails
- Conidae
- Conus
- Conus pelagicus

== Gallery ==
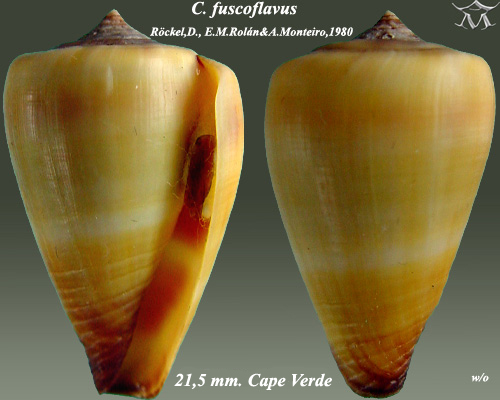
Apertural (left) and abapertural view (right) of Conus fuscoflavus

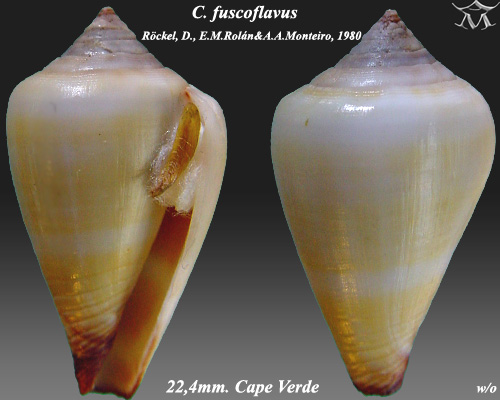
Apertural (left) and abapertural view (right) of Conus fuscoflavus

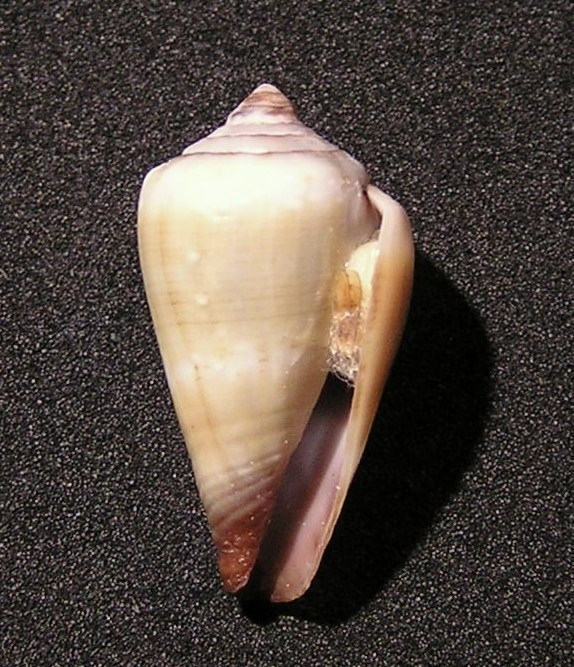
Apertural view of Conus fuscoflavus

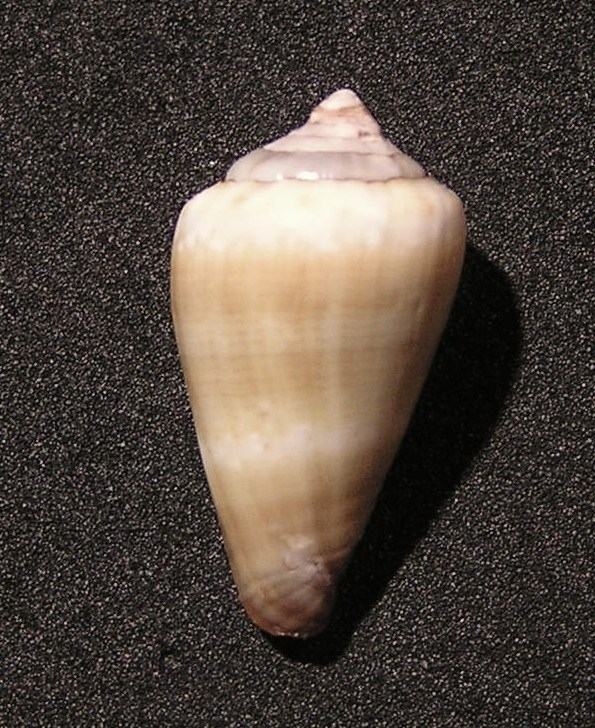
Abapertural view of Conus fuscoflavus
