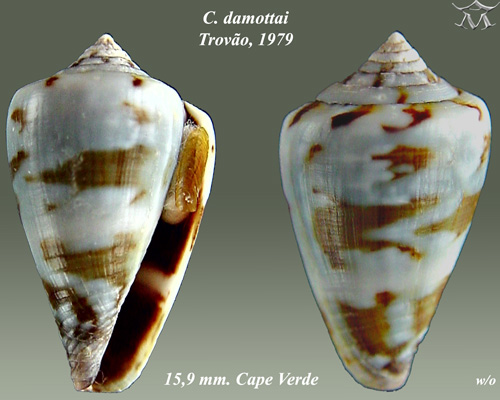
- Apertural and abapertural views of shell of Conus damottai damottai Trovão, 1979

Conservation status
- Least Concern (IUCN 3.1)

Scientific classification
- Kingdom: Animalia
- Phylum: Mollusca
- Class: Gastropoda
- Subclass: Caenogastropoda
- Order: Neogastropoda
- Superfamily: Conoidea
- Family: Conidae
- Genus: Conus
- Species: C. damottai

Binomial name
- Conus damottai Trovão, 1979

Synonyms
- Africonus damottai (Trovão, 1979); Africonus damottai damottai (Trovão, 1979)· accepted, alternate representation; Africonus derrubado (Rolán & F. Fernandes, 1990); Africonus diegoi Cossignani, 2014; Africonus pinedensis Cossignani & Fiadeiro, 2017 (original combination); Africonus purvisi Cossignani & Fiadeiro, 2017 (original combination); Africonus roquensis Cossignani & Fiadeiro, 2015; Africonus umbelinae Cossignani & Fiadeiro, 2014; Conus (Lautoconus) damottai Trovão, 1979· accepted, alternate representation; Conus (Lautoconus) derrubado Rolán & F. Fernandes, 1990; Conus (Lautoconus) diegoi (Cossignani, 2014); Conus damottai damottai Trovão, 1979; Conus derrubado Rolán & Fernandes, 1990; Conus diegoi (Cossignani, 2014)

= Conus damottai =

Species of sea snail

Conus damottai, the glabrous cone, is a species of sea snail, a marine gastropod mollusk in the family Conidae, the cone snails and their allies.

Like all species within the genus Conus, these snails are predatory and venomous. They are capable of stinging humans, therefore live ones should be handled carefully or not at all.

There are two subspecies:

- Conus damottai damottai Trovão, 1979: synonym of Conus damottai Trovão, 1979
- Conus damottai galeao Rolán, 1990: synonym of Conus galeao Rolán, 1990 (original rank)

== Description ==
The size of an adult shell varies between 16 mm and 30 mm.

== Distribution ==
This species occurs in the Cape Verde archipelago, Eastern Atlantic Ocean. The subspecies Conus damottai galeao is only found off the island of Maio (Baía do Galeão, Baía do Navio Quebrado); the subspecies Conus damottai damottai only off the island of Boa Vista.
