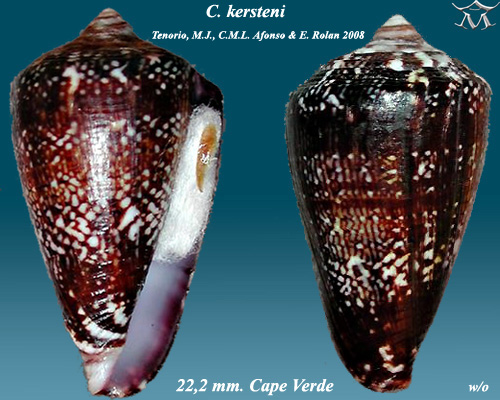
- Apertural and abapertural views of shell of Conus kersteni Tenorio, M.J., C.M.L. Afonso & E. Rolan 2008

Conservation status
- Near Threatened (IUCN 3.1)

Scientific classification
- Kingdom: Animalia
- Phylum: Mollusca
- Class: Gastropoda
- Subclass: Caenogastropoda
- Order: Neogastropoda
- Superfamily: Conoidea
- Family: Conidae
- Genus: Conus
- Species: C. kersteni

Binomial name
- Conus kersteni Tenorio, Afonso, & Rolán, 2008

Synonyms
- Africonus kersteni (Tenorio, Afonso & Rolán, 2008); Conus (Lautoconus) kersteni Tenorio, Afonso, & Rolán, 2008 – accepted, alternate representation

= Conus kersteni =

Species of sea snail

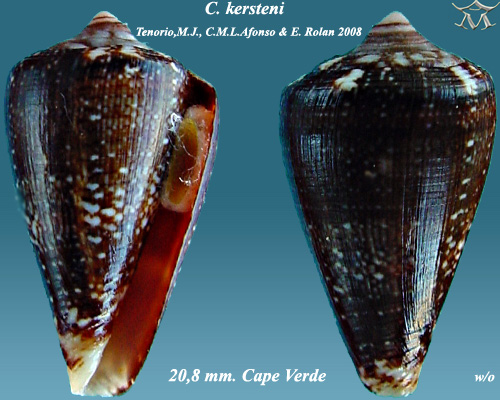
Apertural and abapertural views of shell of Conus kersteni Tenorio, M.J., C.M.L. Afonso & E. Rolan 2008, showing variation in the species.

Conus kersteni is a species of sea snail, a marine gastropod mollusk in the family Conidae, the cone snails and their allies.

Like all species within the genus Conus, these snails are predatory and venomous. They are capable of stinging humans, therefore live ones should be handled carefully or not at all.

== Description ==
The size of the shell varies between 18 mm and 25 mm.

== Distribution ==
This species occurs in the Atlantic Ocean off the island of São Nicolau, Cape Verde.
