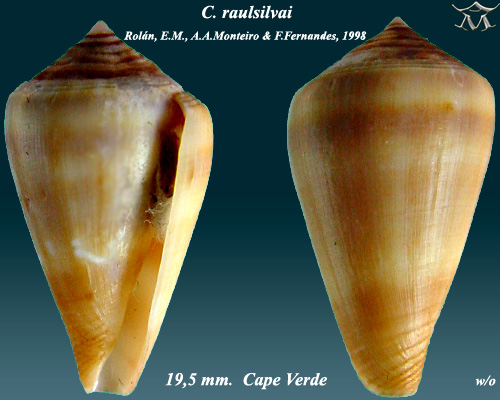
- Apertural and abapertural views of shell of Conus raulsilvai Rolán, E.M., A.A.Monteiro & F.Fernandes, 1998
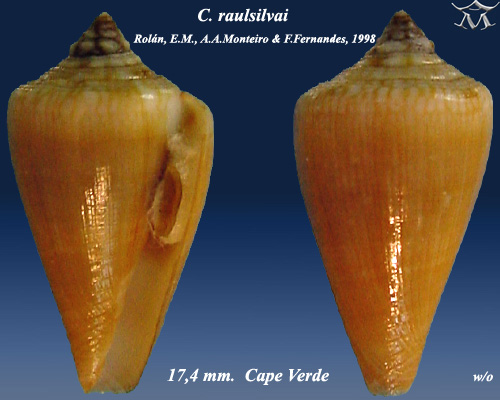

Conservation status
- Least Concern (IUCN 3.1)

Scientific classification
- Kingdom: Animalia
- Phylum: Mollusca
- Class: Gastropoda
- Subclass: Caenogastropoda
- Order: Neogastropoda
- Superfamily: Conoidea
- Family: Conidae
- Genus: Conus
- Species: C. raulsilvai

Binomial name
- Conus raulsilvai Rolán, Monteiro & Fernandes, 1998

Synonyms
- Africonus raulsilvai (Rolán, Monteiro & Fernandes, 1998); Conus (Lautoconus) raulsilvai Rolán, Monteiro & Fernandes, 1998 · accepted, alternate representation

= Conus raulsilvai =

Species of sea snail

Conus raulsilvai is a species of sea snail, a marine gastropod mollusk in the family Conidae, the cone snails and their allies.

Like all species within the genus Conus, these snails are predatory and venomous. They are capable of stinging humans, therefore live ones should be handled carefully or not at all.

== Description ==
The size of the shell varies between 17 mm and 25 mm.

== Distribution ==
This species occurs in the Atlantic Ocean in Cape Verde. It is known only from Maio Island, from shallow water. It must be an insular endemic, and it is a species at high risk of extinction.
