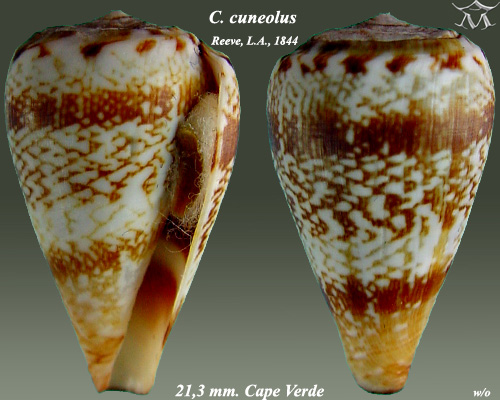
- Apertural and abapertural views of shell of Conus cuneolus Reeve, L.A., 1844
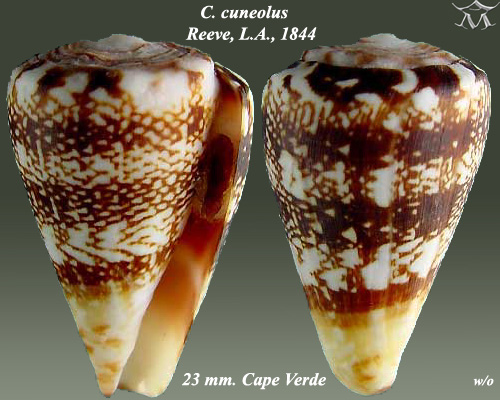

Conservation status
- Endangered (IUCN 3.1)

Scientific classification
- Kingdom: Animalia
- Phylum: Mollusca
- Class: Gastropoda
- Subclass: Caenogastropoda
- Order: Neogastropoda
- Superfamily: Conoidea
- Family: Conidae
- Genus: Conus
- Species: C. cuneolus

Binomial name
- Conus cuneolus Reeve, 1843

Synonyms
- Africonus cuneolus (Reeve, 1843); Conus anthonyi (Petuch, 1975); Conus bernardinoi (Cossignani, 2014); Conus fontonae Rolán & Trovão, 1990; Conus mordeirae Rolán & Trovão, 1990; Conus pseudocuneolus Röckel, Rolán & Monteiro, 1980; Conus serranegrae Rolán, 1990; Conus (Lautoconus) cuneolus Reeve, 1843 accepted, alternate representation

= Conus cuneolus =

Species of sea snail

Conus cuneolus is a species of sea snail, a marine gastropod mollusk in the family Conidae, the cone snails and their allies.

Like all species within the genus Conus, these snails are predatory and venomous. They are capable of stinging humans, therefore live ones should be handled carefully or not at all.

== Description ==
The size of the shell varies between 17 mm and 33 mm. The shell is shortly turbinated, wide at the shoulder, and somewhat inflated. Its color is chestnut- or chocolate-brown, with small white maculations, forming an obscure band at the shoulder, and another below the middle, as well as somewhat scattered over the rest of the surface, including the convex spire.

== Distribution ==
This species occurs in the Atlantic Ocean off the Cape Verdes, where it is restricted to the southwestern part of the island of Sal.
