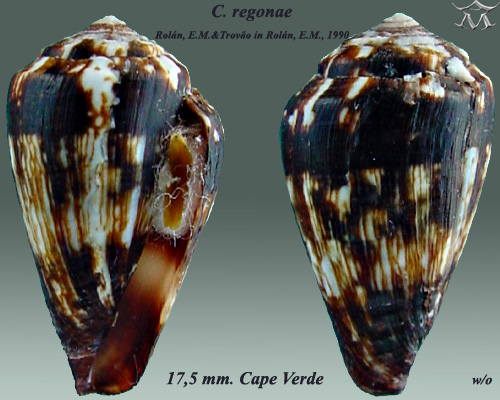
- Apertural and abapertural views of shell of Conus regonae Rolán, E.M. & Trovão in Rolán, E.M., 1990
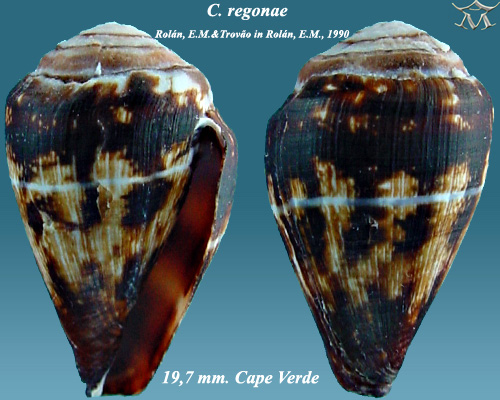

Conservation status
- Least Concern (IUCN 3.1)

Scientific classification
- Kingdom: Animalia
- Phylum: Mollusca
- Class: Gastropoda
- Subclass: Caenogastropoda
- Order: Neogastropoda
- Superfamily: Conoidea
- Family: Conidae
- Genus: Conus
- Species: C. regonae

Binomial name
- Conus regonae Rolán & Trovão in Rolán, 1990

Synonyms
- Africonus regonae (Rolán & Trovão, 1990); Conus (Lautoconus) regonae Rolán & Trovão in Rolán, 1990 · accepted, alternate representation

= Conus regonae =

Species of sea snail

Conus regonae is a species of sea snail, a marine gastropod mollusk in the family Conidae, the cone snails and their allies.

Like all species within the genus Conus, these snails are predatory and venomous. They are capable of stinging humans, therefore live ones should be handled carefully or not at all.

== Description ==
The size of the shell varies between 10 and 25 mm (0.39 and 0.98 in).

== Distribution ==
This species occurs in the Atlantic Ocean off the island of Sal, Cape Verde.
