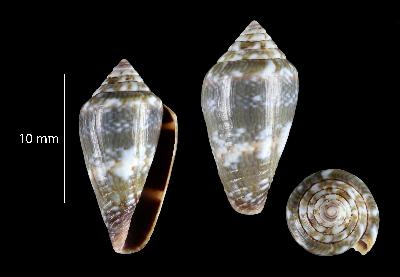
- Shell of Conus santanaensis (paratype in MNHN, Paris)

Scientific classification
- Kingdom: Animalia
- Phylum: Mollusca
- Class: Gastropoda
- Subclass: Caenogastropoda
- Order: Neogastropoda
- Superfamily: Conoidea
- Family: Conidae
- Genus: Conus
- Species: C. santanaensis

Binomial name
- Conus santanaensis (Afonso & Tenorio, 2014)

Synonyms
- Africonus gonsalensis Cossignani & Fiadeiro, 2014; Africonus santanaensis Afonso & Tenorio, 2014 (original combination); Conus (Lautoconus) santanaensis (Afonso & Tenorio, 2014) · accepted, alternate representation

= Conus santanaensis =

Species of sea snail

Conus santanaensis is a species of sea snail, a marine gastropod mollusc in the family Conidae, the cone snails, cone shells or cones.

These snails are predatory and venomous. They are capable of stinging humans.

== Description ==
The size of the shell attains 17 mm.

== Distribution ==
This marine species occurs in the Atlantic Ocean off Maio Island, Cape Verde.
