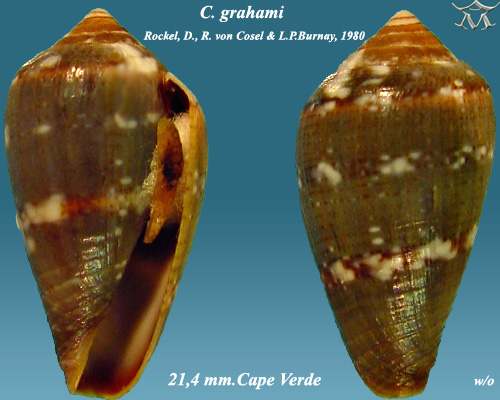
- Apertural and abapertural views of shell of Conus grahami Rockel, D., R. von Cosel & L.P. Burnay, 1980

Conservation status
- Least Concern (IUCN 3.1)

Scientific classification
- Kingdom: Animalia
- Phylum: Mollusca
- Class: Gastropoda
- Subclass: Caenogastropoda
- Order: Neogastropoda
- Superfamily: Conoidea
- Family: Conidae
- Genus: Conus
- Species: C. grahami

Binomial name
- Conus grahami Röckel, Cosel & Burnay, 1980

Synonyms
- Africonus grahami (Röckel, Cosel & Burnay, 1980); Africonus grahami grahami (Röckel, Cosel & Burnay, 1980); Conus grahami grahami Röckel, Cosel & Burnay, 1980; Conus (Lautoconus) grahami Röckel, Cosel & Burnay, 1980 · accepted, alternate representation

= Conus grahami =

Species of sea snail

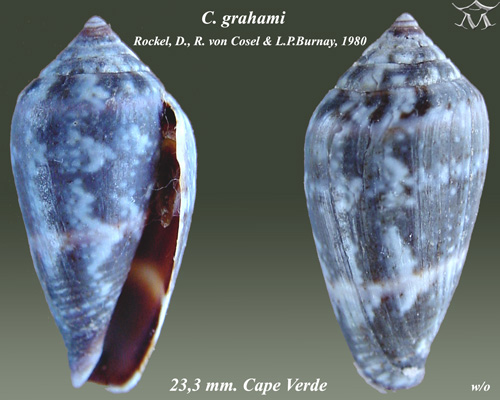
Apertural and abapertural views of shell of Conus grahami Rockel, D., R. von Cosel & L.P. Burnay, 1980, showing variation in the species.

Conus grahami is a species of sea snail, a marine gastropod mollusk in the family Conidae, the cone snails and their allies.

Like all species within the genus Conus, these snails are predatory and venomous. They are capable of stinging humans, therefore live ones should be handled carefully or not at all.

The following two subspecies of Conus grahami are recognized by the World Register of Marine Species:

- Conus grahami grahami Röckel, Cosel & Burnay, 1980: accepted
- Conus grahami luziensis Rolán, Röckel & Monteiro, 1983: accepted

== Description ==
The length of the shell varies between 18 mm and 30 mm.

== Distribution ==
This species occurs in the Atlantic Ocean off the Cape Verde islands of São Vicente (Conus grahami grahami) and Santa Luzia (Conus grahami luziensis).

== Gallery ==
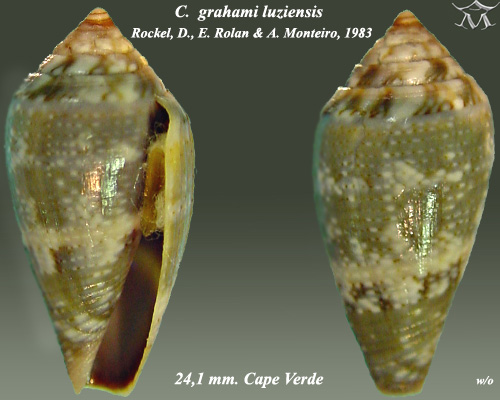
Conus grahami luziensis Röckel, D., E. M. Rolán & A. A. Monteiro, 1983
