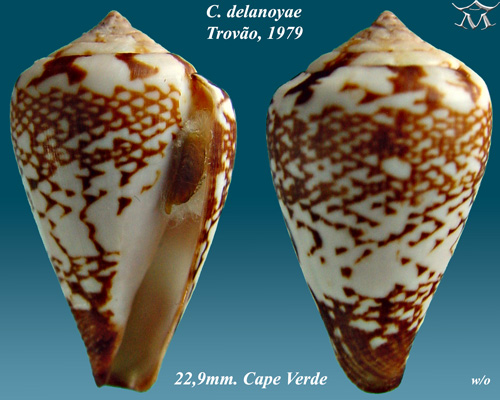
- Apertural and abapertural views of shell of Conus delanoyae Trovão, 1979
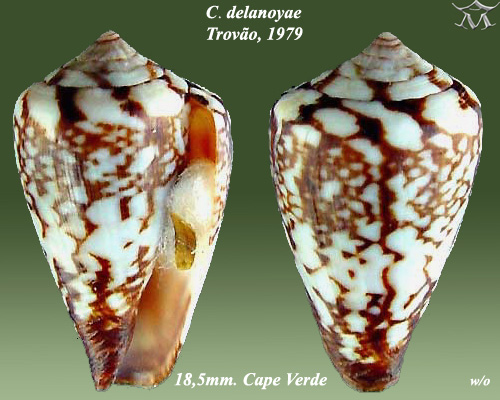

Conservation status
- Least Concern (IUCN 3.1)

Scientific classification
- Kingdom: Animalia
- Phylum: Mollusca
- Class: Gastropoda
- Subclass: Caenogastropoda
- Order: Neogastropoda
- Superfamily: Conoidea
- Family: Conidae
- Genus: Conus
- Species: C. delanoyae

Binomial name
- Conus delanoyae Trovão, 1979

Synonyms
- Africonus delanoyae (Trovão, 1979); Africonus joserochoi Cossignani, 2014; Africonus luquei (Rolán & Trovão, 1990); Africonus swinneni Tenorio, Afonso, Cunha & Rolán, 2014; Conus (Lautoconus) delanoyae Trovão, 1979; Conus (Lautoconus) joserochoi (Cossignani, 2014); Conus (Lautoconus) luquei Rolán & Trovão, 1990; Conus (Lautoconus) swinneni (Tenorio, Afonso, Cunha & Rolán, 2014); Conus delanoyi Trovão, 1979 (improperly formed specific epithet); Conus luquei Rolán & Trovão, 1990; Conus swinneni (Tenorio, Afonso, Cunha & Rolán, 2014)

= Conus delanoyae =

Species of sea snail

Conus delanoyae, common name Delanoy's cone, is a species of sea snail, a marine gastropod mollusk in the family Conidae, the cone snails and their allies.

Like all species within the genus Conus, these snails are predatory and venomous. They are capable of stinging humans, therefore live ones should be handled carefully or not at all.

== Description ==
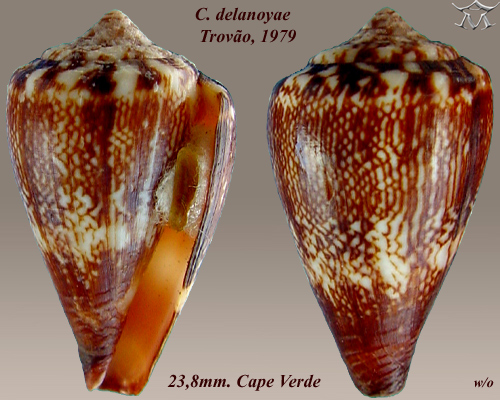
Apertural and abapertural views of shell of Conus delanoyae Trovão, 1979, showing variation in the species.

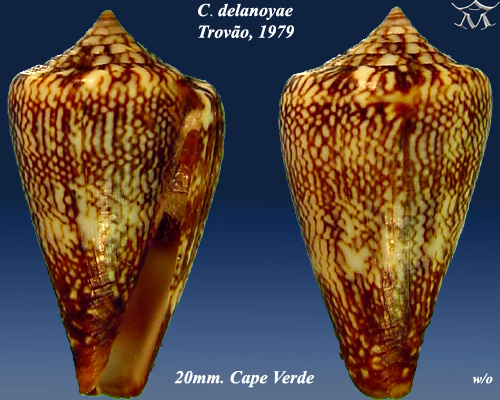
Apertural and abapertural views of shell of Conus delanoyae Trovão, 1979, showing variation in the species.

Conus delanoyae is a medium to large-sized cone snail, typically characterized by a glossy, conical shell. The shell color varies, but it is generally light to dark brown with spiral bands of darker markings, often with a pattern of interrupted lines or spots. The aperture (opening) of the shell is elongated and narrow, as is typical for species in the genus Conus. The shell size typically ranges from 17 to 35 mm in length, though individuals can sometimes be larger or smaller.

== Distribution ==
This species occur off the Atlantic island off Boa Vista, Cape Verde, and dived at 10-15 metres off Boa Vista, Brazil.
