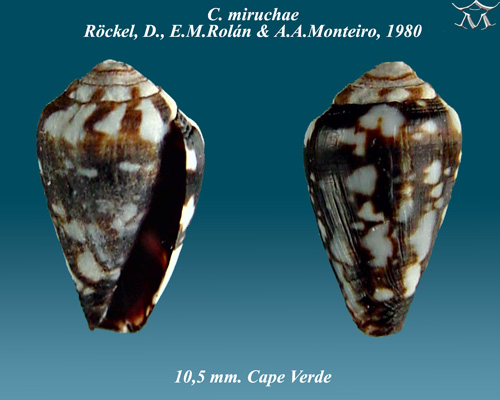
- Two views of a shell of Conus miruchae

Conservation status
- Least Concern (IUCN 3.1)

Scientific classification
- Kingdom: Animalia
- Phylum: Mollusca
- Class: Gastropoda
- Subclass: Caenogastropoda
- Order: Neogastropoda
- Superfamily: Conoidea
- Family: Conidae
- Genus: Conus
- Species: C. miruchae

Binomial name
- Conus miruchae Röckel, Rolán & Monteiro, 1980

Synonyms
- Africonus miruchae (Röckel, Rolán & Monteiro, 1980); Conus (Lautoconus) miruchae Röckel, Rolán & Monteiro, 1980 · accepted, alternate representation

= Conus miruchae =

Species of sea snail

Conus miruchae is a species of sea snail, a marine gastropod mollusk in the family Conidae, the cone snails and their allies.

Like all species within the genus Conus, these snails are predatory and venomous. They are capable of stinging humans, therefore live ones should be handled carefully or not at all.

== Description ==
The size of the shell varies between 7 mm and 13 mm.

== Distribution ==
This species occurs in the Atlantic Ocean off Sal Island, Cape Verde.
