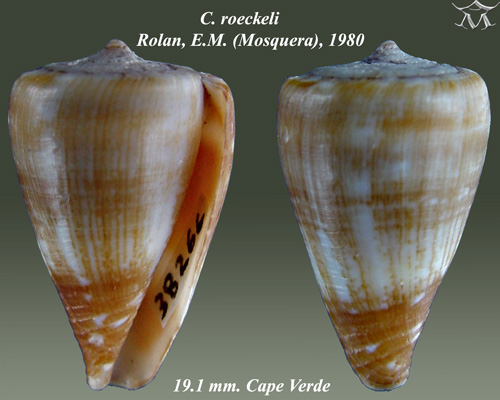
- Apertural and abapertural views of shell of Conus roeckeli Rolan, E.M. (Mosquera), 1980
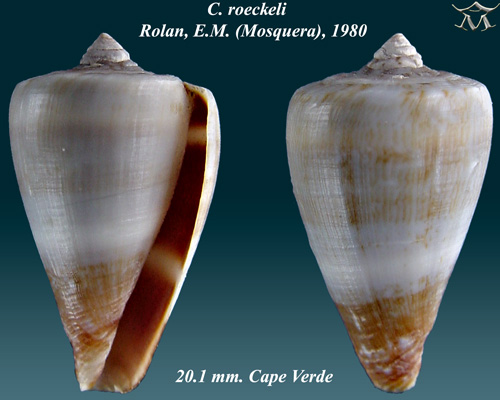

Conservation status
- Least Concern (IUCN 3.1)

Scientific classification
- Kingdom: Animalia
- Phylum: Mollusca
- Class: Gastropoda
- Subclass: Caenogastropoda
- Order: Neogastropoda
- Superfamily: Conoidea
- Family: Conidae
- Genus: Conus
- Species: C. roeckeli

Binomial name
- Conus roeckeli Rolán, 1980

Synonyms
- Africonus roeckeli (Rolán, 1980); Conus damioi (Cossignani & Fiadeiro, 2015); Conus (Lautoconus) roeckeli Rolán, 1980 · accepted, alternate representation

= Conus roeckeli =

Species of sea snail

Conus roeckeli is a species of sea snail, a marine gastropod mollusk in the family Conidae, the cone snails and their allies.

Like all species within the genus Conus, these snails are predatory and venomous. They are capable of stinging humans, therefore live ones should be handled carefully or not at all.

== Description ==
The size of the shell varies between 13 mm and 23 mm.

== Distribution ==
This species occurs in the Atlantic Ocean off the Cape Verdes. It is known only from Boa Vista Island, Cape Verde, between 2 and 5 m depth. Its conservation status is least concern.
