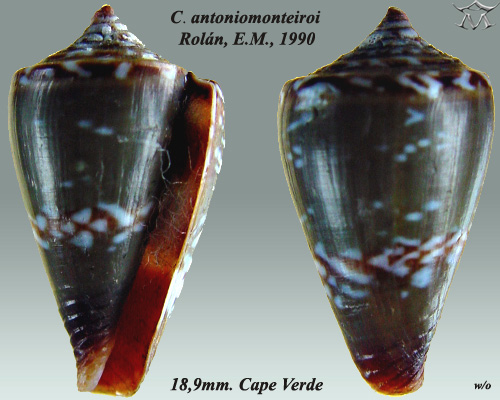
- Apertural and abapertural views of shell of Conus antoniomonteiroi Rolán, 1990
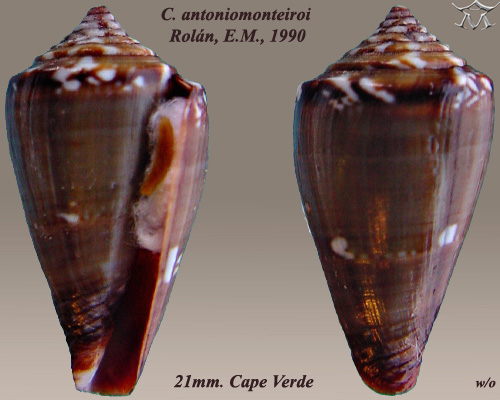

Conservation status
- Least Concern (IUCN 3.1)

Scientific classification
- Kingdom: Animalia
- Phylum: Mollusca
- Class: Gastropoda
- Subclass: Caenogastropoda
- Order: Neogastropoda
- Superfamily: Conoidea
- Family: Conidae
- Genus: Conus
- Species: C. antoniomonteiroi

Binomial name
- Conus antoniomonteiroi Rolán, 1990

Synonyms
- Africonus antoniomonteiroi (Rolán, 1990); Conus (Lautoconus) antoniomonteiroi Rolán, 1990 · accepted, alternate representation

= Conus antoniomonteiroi =

Species of sea snail

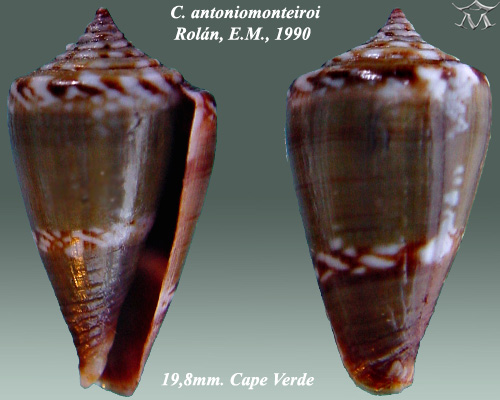
Apertural and abapertural views of shell of Conus antoniomonteiroi Rolán, 1990, showing variation in the species.

Conus antoniomonteiroi is a species of sea snail, a marine gastropod mollusk in the family Conidae, the cone snails and their allies.

Like all species within the genus Conus, these snails are predatory and venomous. They are capable of stinging humans, therefore live ones should be handled carefully or not at all.

== Description ==
The size of the shell varies between 15 mm and 26 mm.

== Distribution ==
This species occurs in the Atlantic Ocean off the island of Sal, Cape Verde.
