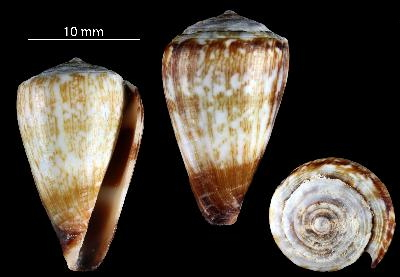
- Shells of Conus gonsaloi (paratype in MNHN, Paris)

Scientific classification
- Kingdom: Animalia
- Phylum: Mollusca
- Class: Gastropoda
- Subclass: Caenogastropoda
- Order: Neogastropoda
- Superfamily: Conoidea
- Family: Conidae
- Genus: Conus
- Species: C. gonsaloi

Binomial name
- Conus gonsaloi (Afonso & Tenorio, 2014)

Synonyms
- Africonus gonsaloi Afonso & Tenorio, 2014 (original combination); Conus (Lautoconus) gonsaloi (Afonso & Tenorio, 2014) · accepted, alternate representation

= Conus gonsaloi =

Species of sea snail

Conus gonsaloi is a species of sea snail, a marine gastropod mollusc in the family Conidae, the cone snails, cone shells or cones.

These snails are predatory and venomous. They are capable of stinging humans.

== Distribution ==
This marine species in the Atlantic Ocean off the Cape Verdes.
