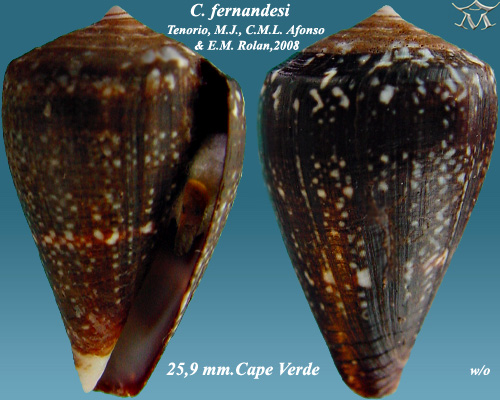
- Apertural and abapertural views of shell

Conservation status
- Endangered (IUCN 3.1)

Scientific classification
- Kingdom: Animalia
- Phylum: Mollusca
- Class: Gastropoda
- Subclass: Caenogastropoda
- Order: Neogastropoda
- Superfamily: Conoidea
- Family: Conidae
- Genus: Conus
- Species: C. fernandesi

Binomial name
- Conus fernandesi Tenorio, Afonso, & Rolán, 2008

Synonyms
- Africonus fernandesi (Tenorio, Afonso & Rolán, 2008); Conus (Lautoconus) fernandesi Tenorio, Afonso, & Rolán, 2008 · accepted, alternate representation

= Conus fernandesi =

Species of sea snail

Conus fernandesi is a species of sea snail, a marine gastropod mollusk in the family Conidae. It is endemic to the Cape Verde islands.

== Description ==
The size of the shell varies between 18 mm and 27 mm. As all species within the genus Conus, these snails are predatory and venomous and capable of stinging humans who handle them.

== Distribution and habitat ==
The species is endemic to Cape Verde and so far only known from a coastal strip 1 km in length on a single island, Santo Antão. It has been found among algae and in crevices at water depths between 2 and 4 m.

== Conservation ==
C. fernandesi appears to be scarce and to have an extremely limited range along the coast of Santo Antão, which also happens to be subject to very heavy ferry traffic. It is therefore considered to be vulnerable to habitat destruction and pollution impacts, and has been classified as endangered by the IUCN.
