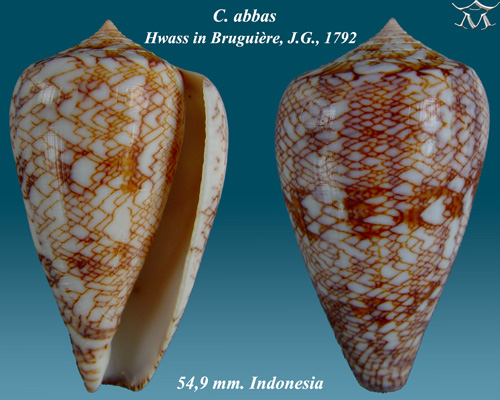

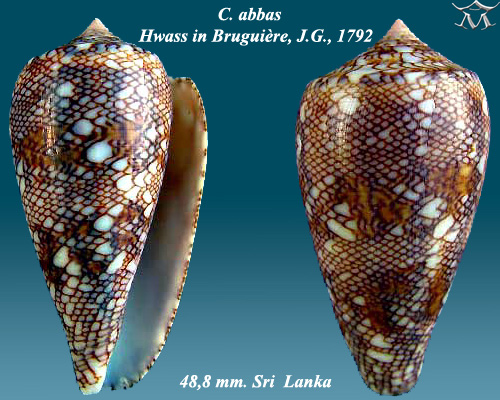
- Apertural and abapertural views of shell of Conus abbas

Conservation status
- Least Concern (IUCN 3.1)

Scientific classification
- Kingdom: Animalia
- Phylum: Mollusca
- Class: Gastropoda
- Subclass: Caenogastropoda
- Order: Neogastropoda
- Superfamily: Conoidea
- Family: Conidae
- Genus: Conus
- Species: C. abbas

Binomial name
- Conus abbas Hwass in Bruguière, 1792

Synonyms
- Conus (Cylinder) abbas Hwass in Bruguière, 1792 · accepted, alternate representation; Conus abbas var. grisea Dautzenberg, 1937; Cylinder abbas (Hwass in Bruguière, 1792)

= Conus abbas =

Species of sea snail

Conus abbas, common name the abbas cone, is a species of sea snail, a marine gastropod mollusk in the family Conidae, the cone snails and their allies.

Like all species within the genus Conus, these snails are predatory and venomous. They are capable of stinging humans, therefore live ones should be handled carefully.

== Description ==
The shell of this species is white, very finely reticulated with narrow orange-brown lines, with a broad central and often narrower upper and lower bands of darker color bearing occasional longitudinal chocolate stripes.

The height of the shell is from 1.5 inches (38 mm) to 2.5 inches (64 mm).

The shell is very similar to that of Conus textile, but the shell is smaller, the reticulations much smaller, the longitudinal streaks rarely apparent, and the dark bands of Conus abbas occupy about the same positions as the lightest markings of Conus textile.

== Distribution ==
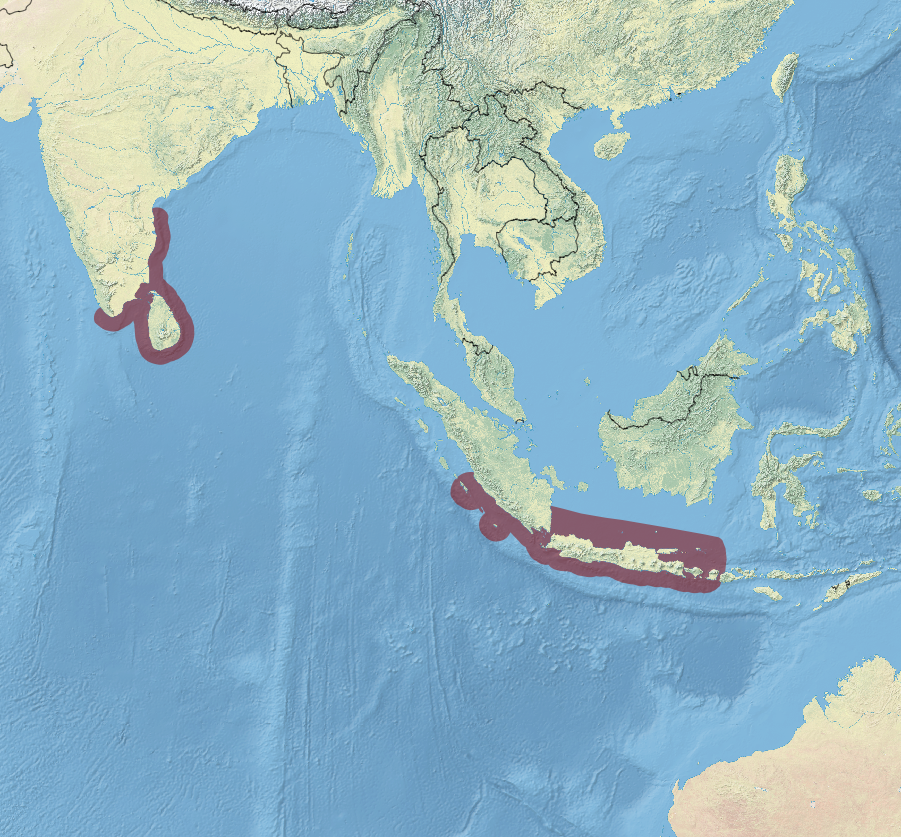
Conus abbas has a disjunct distribution.

- Distribution after Tryon (1884): East Africa, Ceylon, Philippines, New Caledonia.
- Distribution after Conus Biodiversity website: from South India and Sri Lanka to Java and Bali in Indonesia.
- Madagascar

== Ecology ==
Like all species within the genus Conus, these snails are predatory and venomous. They are capable of stinging humans, therefore live ones should be handled carefully or not at all.
