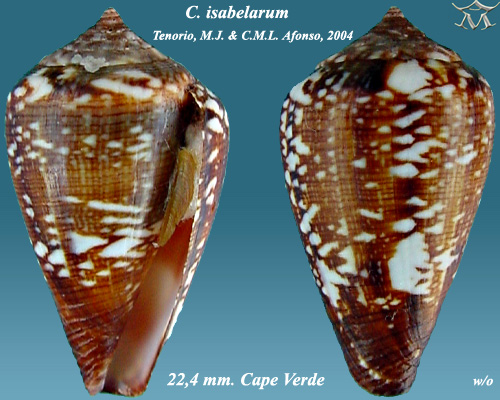
- Apertural and abapertural views of shell of Conus isabelarum Tenorio, M.J. & C.M.L. Afonso, 2004
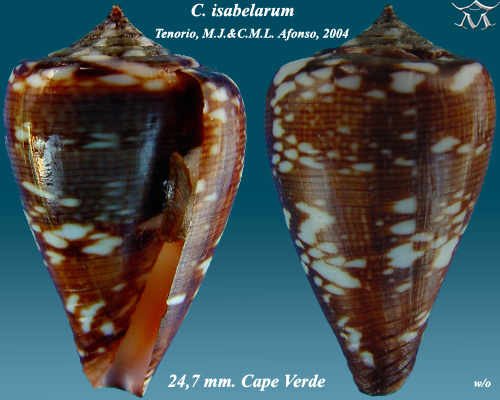

Conservation status
- Least Concern (IUCN 3.1)

Scientific classification
- Kingdom: Animalia
- Phylum: Mollusca
- Class: Gastropoda
- Subclass: Caenogastropoda
- Order: Neogastropoda
- Superfamily: Conoidea
- Family: Conidae
- Genus: Conus
- Species: C. isabelarum

Binomial name
- Conus isabelarum Tenorio & Afonso, 2004

Synonyms
- Africonus isabelarum (Tenorio & Afonso, 2004); Conus (Lautoconus) isabelarum Tenorio & Afonso, 2004 · accepted, alternate representation

= Conus isabelarum =

Species of sea snail

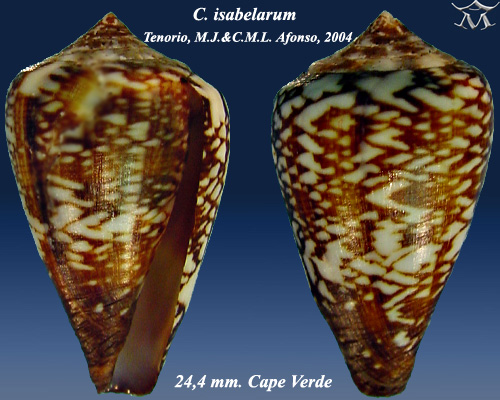
Apertural and abapertural views of shell of Conus isabelarum Tenorio, M.J. & C.M.L. Afonso, 2004, showing variation in the species.

Conus isabelarum is a species of sea snail, a marine gastropod mollusk in the family Conidae, the cone snails and their allies.

Like all species within the genus Conus, these snails are predatory and venomous. They are capable of stinging humans.

== Description ==
The size of the shell varies between 17 mm and 30 mm. The color of the shell is tan or brown with white splashes.

== Distribution ==
This species occurs in the Atlantic Ocean off the island of Maio, Cape Verde.
