= Conus perrineae =

Scientific classification
- Kingdom: Animalia
- Phylum: Mollusca
- Class: Gastropoda
- Subclass: Caenogastropoda
- Order: Neogastropoda
- Superfamily: Conoidea
- Family: Conidae
- Genus: Conus
- Species: C. perrineae

Binomial name
- Conus perrineae (Cossignani & Fiadeiro, 2018)

Synonyms
- Africonus perrineae Cossignani & Fiadeiro, 2018

Species of gastropod

Conus perrineae is a species of sea snail, a marine gastropod mollusk, in the family Conidae, the cone snails and their allies.
