= Conus antoniaensis =

Scientific classification
- Kingdom: Animalia
- Phylum: Mollusca
- Class: Gastropoda
- Subclass: Caenogastropoda
- Order: Neogastropoda
- Superfamily: Conoidea
- Family: Conidae
- Genus: Conus
- Species: C. antoniaensis

Binomial name
- Conus antoniaensis (Cossignani & Fiadeiro, 2014)

Synonyms
- Africonus antoniaensis Cossignani & Fiadeiro, 2014; Africonus padarosae Cossignani & Fiadeiro, 2018

Species of sea snail

Conus antoniaensis is a species of sea snail, a marine gastropod mollusc in the family Conidae, the cone snails, cone shells or cones.

These snails are predatory and venomous. They are capable of stinging humans.

== Description ==
The size of the shell varies between 11 mm and 30 mm. The shell is conical to broadly conical with a low to moderate spire and a sharply angled shoulder. The surface is mostly smooth, except for weak spiral ribs near the anterior end. The ground color is white, overlaid with two spiral bands of light to dark brown blotches, which are in turn marked with darker, interrupted spiral lines. The synonym Africonus padarosae is considered a color form of this species, distinguished by a pinkish or rosy ground color and a more reticulated pattern.

== Distribution ==
This species occurs in the Atlantic Ocean off Boa Vista Island, Cape Verde.
