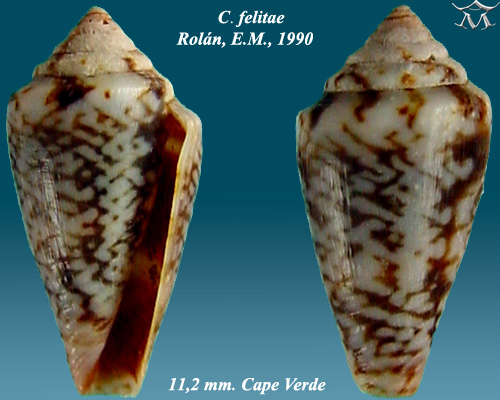
- Apertural and abapertural views of shell of Conus felitae Rolán, E.M., 1990
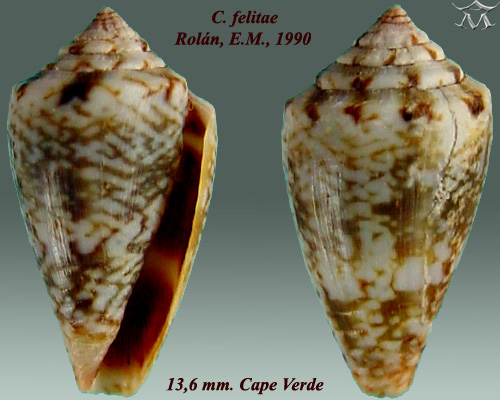

Conservation status
- Least Concern (IUCN 3.1)

Scientific classification
- Kingdom: Animalia
- Phylum: Mollusca
- Class: Gastropoda
- Subclass: Caenogastropoda
- Order: Neogastropoda
- Superfamily: Conoidea
- Family: Conidae
- Genus: Conus
- Species: C. felitae

Binomial name
- Conus felitae Rolán, 1990

Synonyms
- Africonus felitae (Rolán, 1990); Conus (Lautoconus) felitae Rolán, 1990 · accepted, alternate representation

= Conus felitae =

Species of sea snail

Conus felitae is a species of sea snail, a marine gastropod mollusk in the family Conidae, the cone snails and their allies.

Like all species within the genus Conus, these snails are predatory and venomous. They are capable of stinging humans, therefore live ones should be handled carefully or not at all.

== Description ==
The size of the shell varies between 11 mm and 24 mm.

== Distribution ==
This species occurs in the Atlantic Ocean off Sal Island, Cape Verde.
