= Conus salletae =

Scientific classification
- Kingdom: Animalia
- Phylum: Mollusca
- Class: Gastropoda
- Subclass: Caenogastropoda
- Order: Neogastropoda
- Superfamily: Conoidea
- Family: Conidae
- Genus: Conus
- Species: C. salletae

Binomial name
- Conus salletae (Cossignani, 2014)

Synonyms
- Africonus salletae Cossignani, 2014 (original combination); Conus (Lautoconus) salletae (Cossignani, 2014) · accepted, alternate representation

Species of sea snail

Conus salletae is a species of sea snail, a marine gastropod mollusc in the family Conidae, the cone snails, cone shells or cones.

These snails are predatory and venomous. They are capable of stinging humans.

== Description ==
The size of the shell varies between 14 mm and 24 mm.

== Distribution ==
This marine species occurs off Boa Vista Island, Cape Verde.
