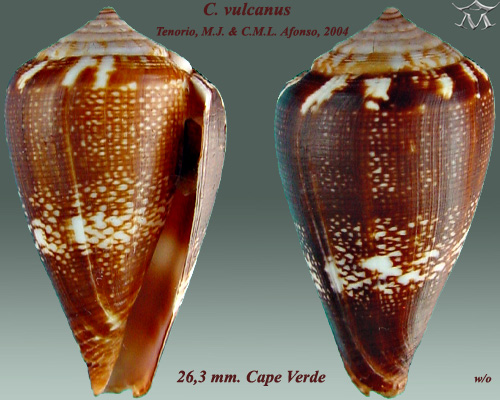
- Apertural and abapertural views of shell of Conus vulcanus Tenorio, M.J. & C.M.L. Afonso, 2004

Conservation status
- Least Concern (IUCN 3.1)

Scientific classification
- Kingdom: Animalia
- Phylum: Mollusca
- Class: Gastropoda
- Subclass: Caenogastropoda
- Order: Neogastropoda
- Superfamily: Conoidea
- Family: Conidae
- Genus: Conus
- Species: C. vulcanus

Binomial name
- Conus vulcanus Tenorio & Afonso, 2004

Synonyms
- Africonus vulcanus (Tenorio & Afonso, 2004); Conus miguelfiaderoi (Cossignani & Fiadeiro, 2015); Conus (Lautoconus) vulcanus Tenorio & Afonso, 2004 · accepted, alternate representation

= Conus vulcanus =

Species of sea snail

Conus vulcanus is a species of sea snail, a marine gastropod mollusk in the family Conidae, the cone snails and their allies.

Like all species within the genus Conus, these snails are predatory and venomous. They are capable of stinging humans, therefore live ones should be handled carefully or not at all.

== Description ==
The shell has a distinctive, intricate pattern with a smooth and glossy surface that can grow up to 13 cm (about 5 inches). It resembles a fine net or lattice. The colors can range from golden brown to yellowish with white or cream-colored markings. The aperture (opening) of the shell is narrow and elongated, running almost the entire length of the shell. The shell have various toxins designed to interfere with a victim's nervous system and operates by joining itself to specific cell surface receptors (glycoproteins) and ion channels

== Distribution ==
This species occurs in the Atlantic Ocean on the coast of the island of Boa Vista, Cape Verde.
