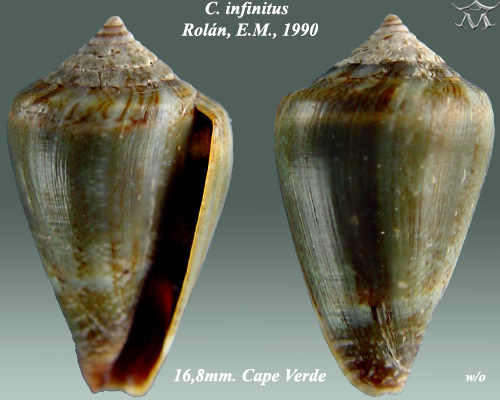
- Apertural and abapertural views of shell of Conus infinitus Rolán, 1990

Conservation status
- Least Concern (IUCN 3.1)

Scientific classification
- Kingdom: Animalia
- Phylum: Mollusca
- Class: Gastropoda
- Subclass: Caenogastropoda
- Order: Neogastropoda
- Superfamily: Conoidea
- Family: Conidae
- Genus: Conus
- Species: C. infinitus

Binomial name
- Conus infinitus Rolán, 1990

Synonyms
- Africonus infinitus (Rolán, 1990); Conus (Lautoconus) infinitus Rolán, 1990 – accepted, alternate representation

= Conus infinitus =

Species of sea snail

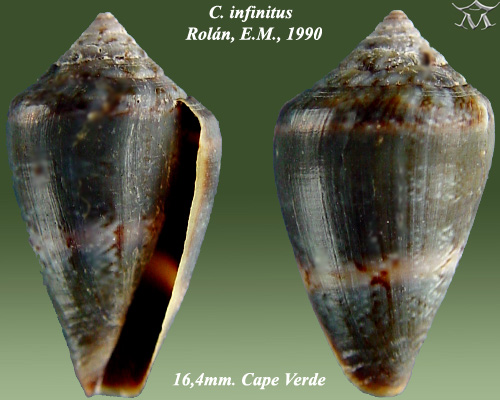
Apertural and abapertural views of shell of Conus infinitus Rolán, 1990, showing variation in the species.

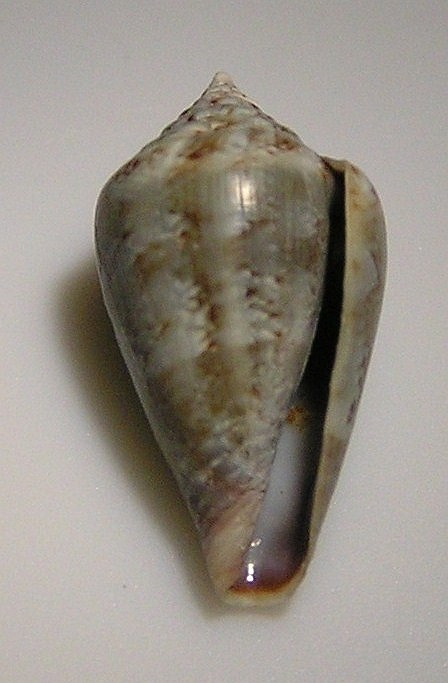
Apertural view of Conus infinitus.

Conus infinitus is a species of sea snail, a marine gastropod mollusk in the family Conidae, the cone snails and their allies.

Like all species within the genus Conus, these snails are predatory and venomous. They are capable of stinging humans, therefore live ones should be handled carefully or not at all.

== Description ==
The size of an adult shell varies between 15 mm and 25 mm. It is long with a wide top and a protruding spiral. The shell is greenish-grey with brown spots.

The core of juvenile shells is yellow.

The animal is slightly redish-grey, with a gradually darker siphon. Juveniles are lighter.

The animal has 41 teeth.

== Distribution ==
This species occurs in the Atlantic Ocean off the island of Maio, Cape Verde.
