= Conus bellulus =

Conservation status
- Data Deficient (IUCN 3.1)

Scientific classification
- Kingdom: Animalia
- Phylum: Mollusca
- Class: Gastropoda
- Subclass: Caenogastropoda
- Order: Neogastropoda
- Superfamily: Conoidea
- Family: Conidae
- Genus: Conus
- Species: C. bellulus

Binomial name
- Conus bellulus Rolán, 1990

Synonyms
- Africonus bellulus (Rolán, 1990); Conus (Lautoconus) bellulus Rolán, 1990 · accepted, alternate representation

Species of sea snail

Conus bellulus is a species of sea snail, a marine gastropod mollusk in the family Conidae, the cone snails and their allies.

Like all species within the genus Conus, these snails are predatory and venomous. They are capable of stinging humans, therefore live ones should be handled carefully or not at all.

== Description ==
The size of the shell varies between 17 mm and 22 mm.

== Distribution ==
This species occurs in the Atlantic Ocean, where it is restricted to the islands of São Vicente and Santa Luzia, Cape Verde.
