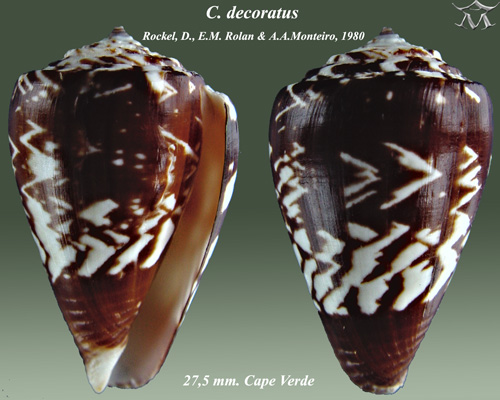
- Apertural and abapertural views of shell of Conus decoratus Rockel, D., E.M.Rolan & A.A.Monteiro, 1980
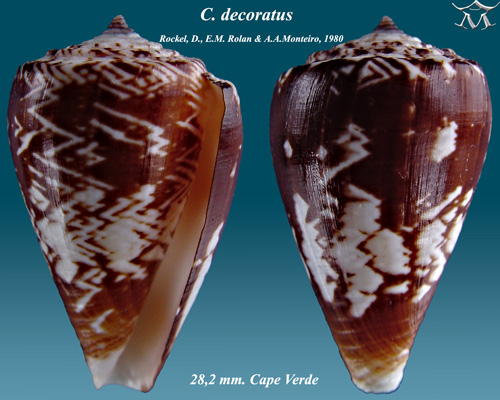

Conservation status
- Vulnerable (IUCN 3.1)

Scientific classification
- Kingdom: Animalia
- Phylum: Mollusca
- Class: Gastropoda
- Subclass: Caenogastropoda
- Order: Neogastropoda
- Superfamily: Conoidea
- Family: Conidae
- Genus: Conus
- Species: C. decoratus

Binomial name
- Conus decoratus Röckel, Rolán & Monteiro, 1980

Synonyms
- Africonus decoratus (Röckel, Rolán & Monteiro, 1980); Conus (Lautoconus) decoratus Röckel, Rolán & Monteiro, 1980· accepted, alternate representation

= Conus decoratus =

Species of sea snail

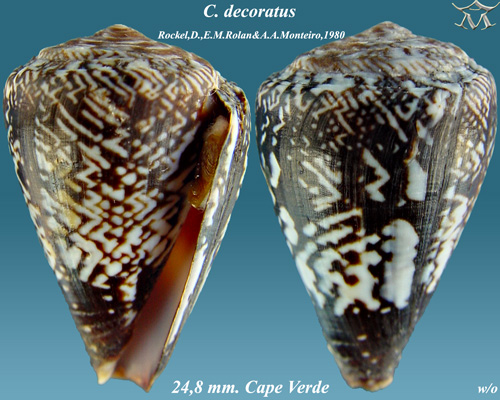
Apertural and abapertural views of shell of Conus decoratus Rockel, D., E.M.Rolan & A.A.Monteiro, 1980, showing variation in the species.

Conus decoratus is a species of sea snail, a marine gastropod mollusk in the family Conidae, the cone snails and their allies.

Like all species within the genus Conus, these snails are predatory and venomous. They are capable of stinging humans, therefore live ones should be handled carefully or not at all.

== Description ==
The size of the shell varies between 20 mm and 35 mm.

Conus decoratus is a species of predatory sea snail belonging to the Conidae family, commonly referred to as cone snails. This marine gastropod is recognized for its strikingly patterned shell and its potent venom, which it uses to subdue prey. Found in tropical marine environments, C. decoratus contributes to the complex ecological balance of coral reef systems and sandy seabeds.

=== Morphology and identification ===
The shell of Conus decoratus is elongated and conical, featuring intricate patterns that vary in color but typically display a combination of brown, beige, and white markings. The beauty of its shell has made it a sought-after specimen among collectors. Despite its aesthetic appeal, this species, like all cone snails, harbors a specialized venom apparatus that enables it to capture prey efficiently.

=== Habitat and distribution ===
Conus decoratus is typically found in shallow tropical waters, inhabiting sandy or rocky seabeds near coral reefs. Its distribution spans across the Indo-Pacific region, where it thrives in warm marine environments. The species prefers areas with moderate water movement, where it can hunt small fish, marine worms, and other mollusks.

=== Feeding and venom ===
As a carnivorous predator, Conus decoratus employs a unique hunting strategy. Using a specialized radular tooth, it injects a potent venom into its prey, paralyzing it almost instantly. The venom contains a complex mixture of conotoxins, which affect the nervous system and can be highly effective in immobilizing small marine organisms. Though human envenomation is rare, handling live specimens is discouraged due to the potential risks.

=== Conservation and importance ===
While Conus decoratus is not currently classified as endangered, habitat destruction and climate change pose potential threats to its population. As with many marine species, the preservation of coral reefs and coastal environments is crucial for its continued survival. Additionally, research into cone snail venom has led to significant biomedical discoveries, including potential painkillers derived from conotoxins.

== Distribution ==
This species occurs in the Atlantic Ocean off Santa Luzia and São Vicente, Cape Verde.
