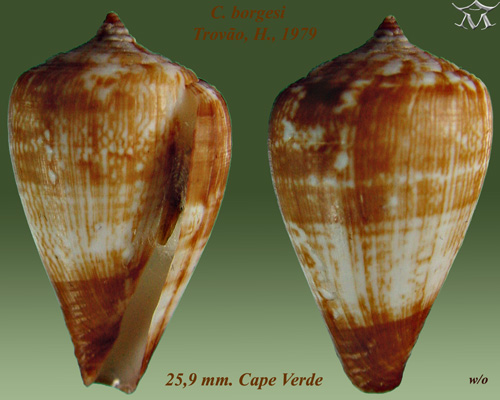
- Apertural and abapertural views of shell of Conus borgesi Trovão, 1979
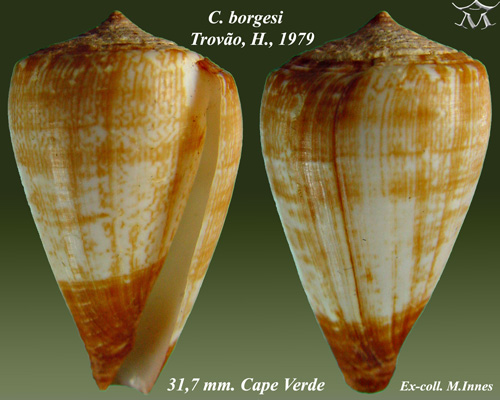

Conservation status
- Least Concern (IUCN 3.1)

Scientific classification
- Kingdom: Animalia
- Phylum: Mollusca
- Class: Gastropoda
- Subclass: Caenogastropoda
- Order: Neogastropoda
- Superfamily: Conoidea
- Family: Conidae
- Genus: Conus
- Species: C. borgesi

Binomial name
- Conus borgesi Trovão, 1979

Synonyms
- Africonus borgesi (Trovão, 1979); Africonus pedrofiadeiroi Cossignani & Fiadeiro, 2015; Africonus wandae Cossignani, 2014 (original combination); Conus (Lautoconus) borgesi Trovão, 1979 · accepted, alternate representation

= Conus borgesi =

Species of sea snail

Conus borgesi is a species of sea snail, a marine gastropod mollusk in the family Conidae, the cone snails and their allies.

Like all species within the genus Conus, these snails are predatory and venomous. They are capable of stinging humans, therefore live ones should be handled carefully or not at all.

== Description ==
The size of the shell varies between 19 mm and 35 mm. Conus borgesi has a long, tubular shell with a pointed vertex. The color of the shell is typically white or cream, with intricate patterns of brown, black and yellow. The snail uses its shell as protection and as a tool for burrowing in the sand.

Conus borgesi is a skilled predator that uses its venomous harpoon-like tooth to capture its prey. The tooth is housed in a specialized structure called a proboscis, which the snail can extend out of its mouth to strike its target. Once the prey is paralyzed, the snail will engulf it using its large, muscular foot and slowly consume it.

Like all cone snails, Conus borgesi has a complex venom delivery system that allows it to inject its toxins into its prey or potential predators. The venom of this species contains a variety of different toxins, including peptides and small molecules, that can target different receptors and pathways in the body.

While cone snail venom can be deadly, it has also been used for centuries by indigenous peoples for medicinal purposes. In recent years, scientists have been studying cone snail venom as a potential source of new drugs and therapies, particularly for pain management and neurological disorders.

== Distribution ==
This species occurs in the Atlantic Ocean off the island of Boa Vista, Cape Verde.
