= Conus galeao =

Scientific classification
- Kingdom: Animalia
- Phylum: Mollusca
- Class: Gastropoda
- Subclass: Caenogastropoda
- Order: Neogastropoda
- Superfamily: Conoidea
- Family: Conidae
- Genus: Conus
- Species: C. galeao

Binomial name
- Conus galeao Rolán, 1990

Synonyms
- Africonus damottai galeao (Rolán, 1990); Africonus galeao (Rolán, 1990); Conus (Lautoconus) galeao (Rolán, 1990); Conus damottai galeao Rolán, 1990

Species of gastropod

Conus galeao is a species of sea snail, a marine gastropod mollusk, in the family Conidae, the cone snails and their allies.
