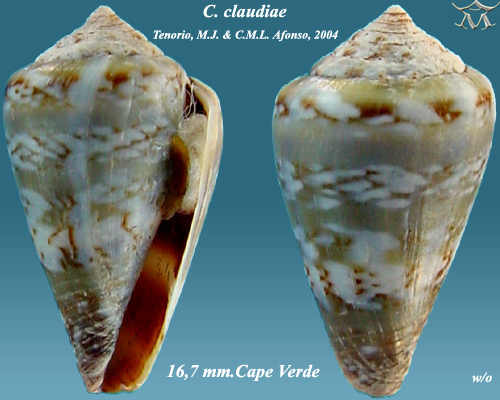

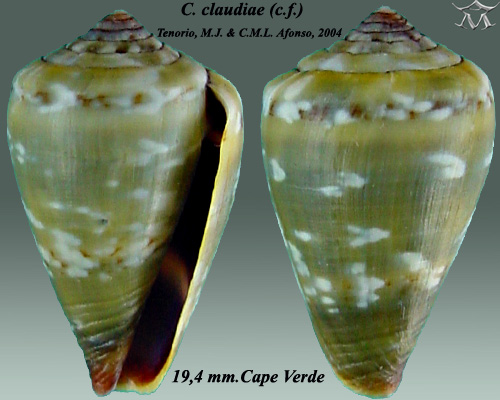

Conservation status
- Least Concern (IUCN 3.1)

Scientific classification
- Kingdom: Animalia
- Phylum: Mollusca
- Class: Gastropoda
- Subclass: Caenogastropoda
- Order: Neogastropoda
- Superfamily: Conoidea
- Family: Conidae
- Genus: Conus
- Species: C. calhetae

Binomial name
- Conus calhetae Rolán, 1990

Synonyms
- Africonus calhetae (Rolán, 1990); Conus claudiae Tenorio & Afonso, 2004; Conus navarroi calhetae Rolán, 1990 (original rank); Conus (Lautoconus) calhetae (Rolán, 1990) · accepted, alternate representation

= Conus calhetae =

Species of sea snail

Conus calhetae is a species of a sea snail, a marine gastropod mollusk in the family Conidae, the cone snails and their allies.

Like all species within the genus Conus, these snails are predatory and venomous. They are capable of stinging humans, therefore live ones should be handled carefully or not at all.

== Description ==
The size of the shell varies between 13 mm and 27 mm. The shell is often colored a dark yellow and is covered in white patterns.

== Distribution ==
This species occurs in the Atlantic Ocean off the island of Maio, Cape Verde.
