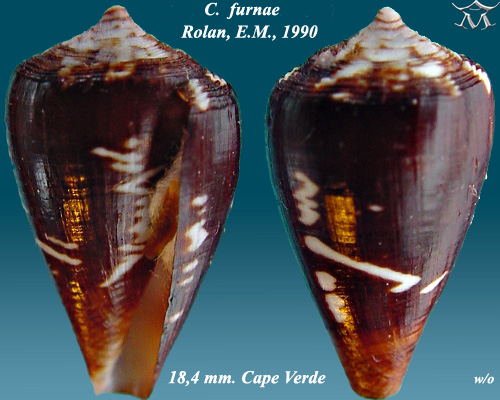
- Apertural and abapertural views of shell of Conus furnae Rolan, E.M., 1990
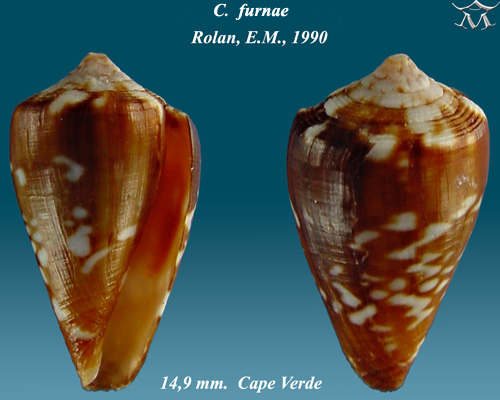

Conservation status
- Least Concern (IUCN 3.1)

Scientific classification
- Kingdom: Animalia
- Phylum: Mollusca
- Class: Gastropoda
- Subclass: Caenogastropoda
- Order: Neogastropoda
- Superfamily: Conoidea
- Family: Conidae
- Genus: Conus
- Species: C. furnae

Binomial name
- Conus furnae Rolán, 1990

Synonyms
- Africonus furnae (Rolán, 1990); Conus (Lautoconus) furnae Rolán, 1990 · accepted, alternate representation; Conus verdensis furnae Rolán, 1990

= Conus furnae =

Species of sea snail

Conus furnae is a species of sea snail, a marine gastropod mollusk in the family Conidae, the cone snails and their allies.

Like all species within the genus Conus, these snails are predatory and venomous. They are capable of stinging humans, therefore live ones should be handled carefully or not at all.

== Description ==
The length of the shell attains 23 mm.

== Distribution ==
This species occurs in the Atlantic Ocean off the island of Brava, Cape Verde.
