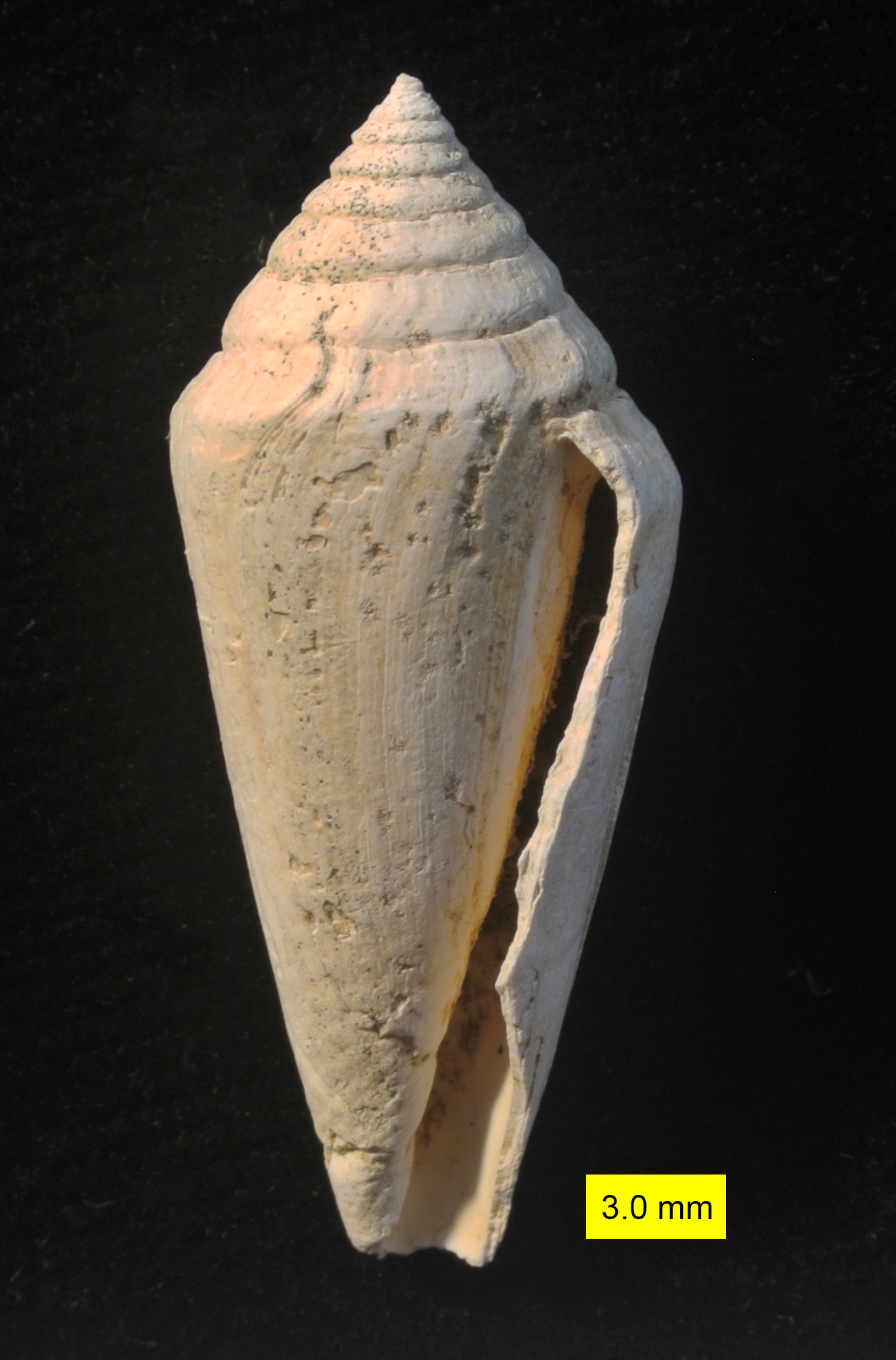
- Shell of Conus pelagicus

Conservation status
- Extinct (IUCN 3.1)

Scientific classification
- Kingdom: Animalia
- Phylum: Mollusca
- Class: Gastropoda
- Subclass: Caenogastropoda
- Order: Neogastropoda
- Superfamily: Conoidea
- Family: Conidae
- Genus: Conus
- Species: †C. pelagicus

Binomial name
- †Conus pelagicus Brocchi, 1814

Synonyms
- Conus (Chelyconus) pelagicus Brocchi, 1814

= Conus pelagicus =

Conus pelagicus Temporal range: Miocene-Pleistocene

Species of sea snail

Conus pelagicus is an extinct species of sea snail, a marine gastropod mollusk in the family Conidae, the cone snails, cone shells or cones.

== Description ==
The length of this conical shell is 54 mm. It has a rather elevated spire with 12 inclined whorls, some of which are somewhat rounded. The shell is covered with tawny circular spots and a few longitudinal corrugated, marbling streaks.

== Distribution ==
This marine species of cone snail has only been found as a fossil in the Pleistocene, Pliocene and Miocene of Europe.
