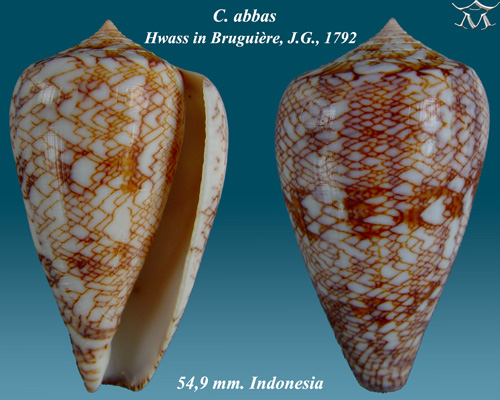
- Apertural and abapertural views of shell of Conus abbas

Scientific classification
- Kingdom: Animalia
- Phylum: Mollusca
- Class: Gastropoda
- Subclass: Caenogastropoda
- Order: Neogastropoda
- Superfamily: Conoidea
- Family: Conidae
- Genus: Conus; Linnaeus, 1758

Type species
- Conus marmoreus Linnaeus, 1758

Species
- See List of Conus species

Synonyms
- List: Afonsoconus Tucker & Tenorio, 2013; Africonus Petuch, 1975; Afroconus Petuch, 1975 [lapsus]; Arubaconus Petuch, 2013; Asprella Schaufuss, 1869; Atlanticonus Petuch & Sargent, 2012; Attenuiconus Petuch, 2013; Austroconus Tucker & Tenorio, 2009; Bermudaconus Petuch, 2013; Brasiliconus Petuch, 2013; Calamiconus Tucker & Tenorio, 2009; Calibanus da Motta, 1991; Cariboconus Petuch, 2003; Chelyconus Mörch, 1852; Cleobula Iredale, 1930; Conasprella (Varioconus) da Motta, 1991; Conasprelloides Tucker & Tenorio, 2009; Continuconus Tucker & Tenorio, 2013; Conus (Afonsoconus) Tucker & Tenorio, 2013; Conus (Asprella) Schaufuss, 1869; Conus (Atlanticonus) Petuch & Sargent, 2012; Conus (Attenuiconus) Petuch, 2013; Conus (Austroconus) Tucker & Tenorio, 2009; Conus (Bermudaconus) Petuch, 2013; Conus (Brasiliconus) Petuch, 2013; Conus (Calibanus) da Motta, 1991; Conus (Chelyconus) Mörch, 1852; Conus (Conus) Linnaeus, 1758; Conus (Coronaxis) Swainson, 1840; Conus (Cylinder) Montfort, 1810; Conus (Cylindrella) Swainson, 1840; Conus (Darioconus) Iredale, 1930; Conus (Dauciconus) Cotton, 1945; Conus (Dendroconus) Swainson, 1840; Conus (Ductoconus) da Motta, 1991; Conus (Elisaconus) Tucker & Tenorio, 2013; Conus (Embrikena) Iredale, 1937; Conus (Eremiconus) Tucker & Tenorio, 2009; Conus (Eugeniconus) da Motta, 1991; Conus (Floraconus) Iredale, 1930; Conus (Fraterconus) Tucker & Tenorio, 2013; Conus (Fulgiconus) da Motta, 1991; Conus (Gastridium) Modeer, 1793; Conus (Genuanoconus) J. K. Tucker & Tenorio, 2009; Conus (Harmoniconus) da Motta, 1991; Conus (Hermes) Montfort, 1810; Conus (Kalloconus) da Motta, 1991; Conus (Kellyconus) Petuch, 2013; Conus (Kioconus) da Motta, 1991; Conus (Klemaeconus) Tucker & Tenorio, 2013; Conus (Lamniconus) da Motta, 1991; Conus (Lautoconus) Monterosato, 1923; Conus (Leporiconus) Iredale, 1930; Conus (Leptoconus) Swainson, 1840; Conus (Lindaconus) Petuch, 2002; Conus (Lithoconus) Mörch, 1852; Conus (Lividoconus) Wils, 1970; Conus (Magelliconus) da Motta, 1991; Conus (Malagasyconus) Monnier & Tenorio, 2015; Conus (Monteiroconus) da Motta, 1991; Conus (Papyriconus) Tucker & Tenorio, 2013; Conus (Phasmoconus) Mörch, 1852; Conus (Pionoconus) Mörch, 1852; Conus (Plicaustraconus) Moolenbeek, 2008; Conus (Pseudonoduloconus) Tucker & Tenorio, 2009; Conus (Pseudopterygia) Tucker & Tenorio, 2013; Conus (Puncticulis) Swainson, 1840; Conus (Purpuriconus) da Motta, 1991; Conus (Pyruconus) Olsson, 1967; Conus (Quasiconus) Tucker & Tenorio, 2009; Conus (Rhizoconus) Mörch, 1852; Conus (Rubroconus) Tucker & Tenorio, 2013; Conus (Sandericonus) Petuch, 2013; Conus (Sciteconus) da Motta, 1991; Conus (Splinoconus) da Motta, 1991; Conus (Spuriconus) Petuch, 2003; Conus (Stephanoconus) Mörch, 1852; Conus (Strategoconus) da Motta, 1991; Conus (Strioconus) Thiele, 1929; Conus (Tesselliconus) da Motta, 1991; Conus (Textilia) Swainson, 1840; Conus (Theliconus) Swainson, 1840; Conus (Turriconus) Shikama & Habe, 1968; Conus (Virgiconus) Cotton, 1945; Conus (Virroconus) Iredale, 1930; Conus (Vituliconus) da Motta, 1991; Cornutoconus Suzuki, 1972; Coronaxis Swainson, 1840; Coronaxis (Cylindrella) Swainson, 1840; Coronaxis (Tuliparia) Swainson, 1840; Cucullus Röding, 1798; Cylinder Montfort, 1810; Cylindrus Batsch, 1789; Darioconus Iredale, 1930; Dauciconus Cotton, 1945; Dendroconus Swainson, 1840; Dendroconus (Erythroconus) da Motta, 1991; Dendroconus (Harmoniconus) da Motta, 1991; Dendroconus (Ketyconus) da Motta, 1991; Dendroconus (Lithoconus) Mörch, 1852; Dendroconus (Sciteconus) da Motta, 1991; Dendroconus (Socioconus) da Motta, 1991; Dendroconus (Splinoconus) da Motta, 1991; Dendroconus (Strioconus) Thiele, 1929; Dendroconus (Tesselliconus) da Motta, 1991; Ductoconus da Motta, 1991; Dyraspis Iredale, 1949; Elisaconus Tucker & Tenorio, 2013; Embrikena Iredale, 1937; Eremiconus Tucker & Tenorio, 2009; Erythroconus da Motta, 1991; Eugeniconus da Motta, 1991; Floraconus Iredale, 1930; Floraconus (Sciteconus) da Motta, 1991; Fraterconus Tucker & Tenorio, 2013; Fulgiconus da Motta, 1991; Gastridium Modeer, 1793; Genuanoconus Tucker & Tenorio, 2009; Gladioconus Tucker & Tenorio, 2009; Gradiconus da Motta, 1991; Graphiconus da Motta, 1991; Harmoniconus da Motta, 1991; Hermes Montfort, 1810; Hermes (Heroconus) da Motta, 1991; Hermes (Hermes) da Motta, 1991; Isoconus Tucker & Tenorio, 2013; Kalloconus da Motta, 1991; Kalloconus (Trovaoconus) ) J. K. Tucker & Tenorio, 2009; Kellyconus Petuch, 2013; Ketyconus da Motta, 1991; Kioconus da Motta, 1991; Kioconus (Isoconus) J. K. Tucker & Tenorio, 2013; Kioconus (Ongoconus) da Motta, 1991; Klemaeconus Tucker & Tenorio, 2013; Kurodaconus Shikama & Habe, 1968; Lamniconus da Motta, 1991; Lautoconus Monterosato, 1923; Lautoconus (Lautoconus) Monterosato, 1923; Leporiconus Iredale, 1930; Leptoconus Swainson, 1840; Leptoconus (Calibanus) da Motta, 1991; Leptoconus (Chelyconus) Mörch, 1852; Leptoconus (Gradiconus) da Motta, 1991; Leptoconus (Graphiconus) da Motta, 1991; Leptoconus (Lamniconus) da Motta, 1991; Leptoconus (Phasmoconus) Mörch, 1852; Leptoconus (Protoconus) da Motta, 1991; Leptoconus (Purpuriconus) da Motta, 1991; Leptoconus (Rhizoconus) Mörch, 1852; Leptoconus (Thoraconus) da Motta, 1991; Lindaconus Petuch, 2002; Lithoconus Mörch, 1852; Lividiconus [lapsus]; Lividoconus Wils, 1970; Magelliconus da Motta, 1991; Miliariconus Tucker & Tenorio, 2009; Mitraconus Tucker & Tenorio, 2013; Monteiroconus da Motta, 1991; Nataliconus Tucker & Tenorio, 2009; Nimboconus Tucker & Tenorio, 2013; Nitidoconus Tucker & Tenorio, 2013; Nubecula Herrmanssen, 1847; Papyriconus Tucker & Tenorio, 2013; Phasmoconus Mörch, 1852; Phasmoconus (Fulgiconus) da Motta, 1991; Phasmoconus (Graphiconus) da Motta, 1991; Phasmoconus (Phasmoconus) Mörch, 1852; Pictoconus Limpalaër & Monnier, 2018; Pionoconus Mörch, 1852; Plicaustraconus Moolenbeek, 2008; Poremskiconus Petuch, 2013; Protoconus da Motta, 1991 (Invalid: junior homonym of Protoconus Yu, 1979 and Protoconus Stinchcomb, 1986; Tenorioconus is a replacement name); Protostrioconus Tucker & Tenorio, 2009; Pseudohermes Tucker & Tenorio, 2013; Pseudonoduloconus Tucker & Tenorio, 2009; Pseudopterygia Tucker & Tenorio, 2013; Puncticulis Swainson, 1840; Purpuriconus da Motta, 1991; Pyruconus Olsson, 1967; Quasiconus Tucker & Tenorio, 2009; Regiconus Iredale, 1930; Rhizoconus Mörch, 1852; Rhombiconus Tucker & Tenorio, 2009; Rhombus Montfort, 1810 (Invalid: junior homonym of Rhombus Walbaum, 1792 [Pisces]); Rolaniconus Tucker & Tenorio, 2009; Rollus Montfort, 1810; Rubroconus Tucker & Tenorio, 2013; Sandericonus Petuch, 2013; Sciteconus da Motta, 1991; Seminoleconus Petuch, 2003; Spuriconus Petuch, 2003; Stellaconus Tucker & Tenorio, 2009; Stephanoconus Mörch, 1852; Strategoconus da Motta, 1991; Strategoconus (Vituliconus) da Motta, 1991; Strioconus Thiele, 1929; Sulciconus Bielz, 1869; Taranteconus Azuma, 1972; Tenorioconus Petuch & Drolshagen, 2011; Tesselliconus da Motta, 1991; Textilia Swainson, 1840; Textiliinae da Motta, 1995; Thalassiconus Tucker & Tenorio, 2013); Thoraconus da Motta, 1991; Trovaoconus Tucker & Tenorio, 2009; Tuckericonus Petuch, 2013; Turriconus Shikama & Habe, 1968; Turriconus (Kurodaconus) Shikama & Habe, 1968; Turriconus (Mitraconus) J. K. Tucker & Tenorio, 2013; Turriconus (Turriconus ) Shikama & Habe, 1968; Utriculus Schumacher, 1817; Varioconus da Motta, 1991; Virgiconus Cotton, 1945; Virroconus Iredale, 1930; Vituliconus da Motta, 1991

= Conus =

Conus Temporal range: Eocene–Recent

Genus of molluscs

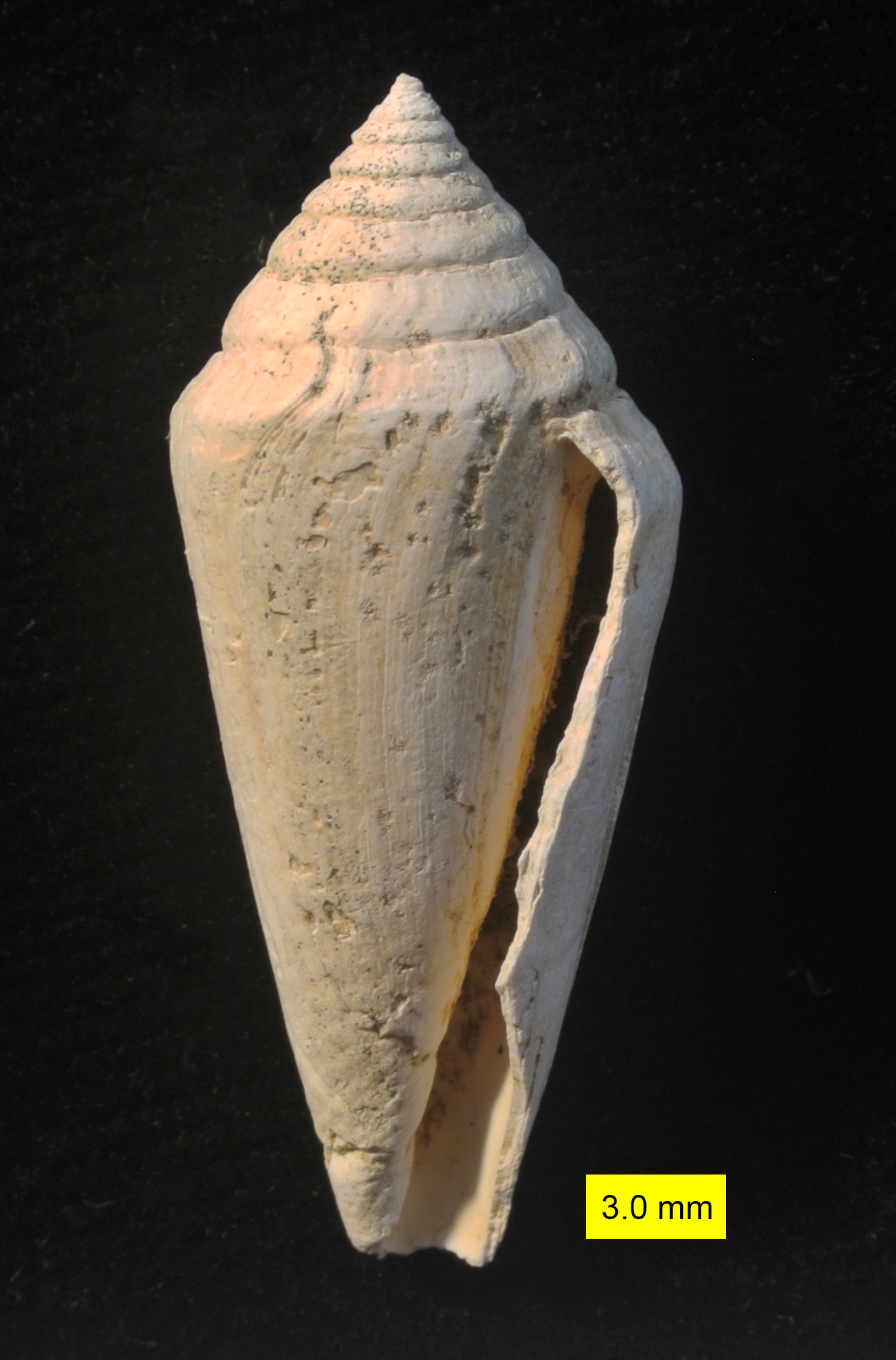
Fossil Conus pelagicus from the Pliocene of Cyprus

Conus is a genus of venomous and predatory cone snails. Before 2009, it included all cone snail species but is now more precisely defined.

== Description ==
The thick shell of species in the genus Conus sensu stricto, is obconic, with the whorls enrolled upon themselves. The spire is short, smooth or tuberculated. The narrow aperture is elongated with parallel margins and is truncated at the base. The operculum is very small relative to the size of the shell. It is corneous, narrowly elongated, with an apical nucleus, and the impression of the muscular attachment varies from one-half to two-thirds of the inner surface. The outer lip shows a slight sutural sinus.

== Distribution and habitat ==
Species in the genus Conus sensu stricto can be found in the tropical and subtropical seas of the world, at depths ranging from the sublittoral (c. 200 m) to 1,000 m (656 to 3,280 ft). They are very variable in some of their characters, such as the tuberculation of the spire and body whorl, striae, colors, and the pattern of coloring.

The oldest known fossil of Conus is from the lower Eocene, about 55 million years ago.

== See also ==
- List of Conus species
