= Helicostyla =

Scientific classification
- Kingdom: Animalia
- Phylum: Mollusca
- Class: Gastropoda
- Order: Stylommatophora
- Superfamily: Helicoidea
- Family: Camaenidae
- Subfamily: Helicostylinae
- Genus: Helicostyla; Férussac, 1821

Type species
- Helix mirabilis Férussac, 1821

Synonyms
- Bulimus (Eudoxus) Albers, 1850; Bulimus (Orthostylus) Beck, 1837 (original combination); Cochlostyla (Helicostyla) Férussac, 1821 (unaccepted combination); Cochlostyla (Opalliostyla) Pilsbry, 1896 · alternate representation; Cochlostyla (Orthostylus) Beck, 1837 (unaccepted combination); Eudoxus Albers, 1850; Helicostyla (Cochlodryas) Martens, 1860· accepted, alternate representation; Helicostyla (Dryocochlias) Möllendorff, 1898· accepted, alternate representation (basionym); Helicostyla (Eudoxus) Albers, 1850· accepted, alternate representation; Helicostyla (Helicostyla) Férussac, 1821 · alternate representation; Helicostyla (Opalliostyla) Pilsbry, 1896 (invalid: unnecessary replacement name); Helicostyla (Orthostylus) Beck, 1837 · alternate representation; Orthostylus Beck, 1837 (junior synonym)

Genus of gastropods

Helicostyla is a genus of small, air-breathing land snails, terrestrial pulmonate gastropod mollusks in the subfamily Helicostylinae of the family Camaenidae. Helicostyla is the type genus of the subfamily Helicostylinae.

== Distribution ==
This genus is endemic to the Philippines.

== Species ==
Species within the genus Helicostyla include:

- Helicostyla albina (Grateloup, 1840)
- Helicostyla amagaensis de Chavez, Kendrich, Fontanilla, Batomalaque & Chiba, 2015
- Helicostyla amaliae (Möllendorff, 1890)
- Helicostyla aplomorpha (Jonas, 1843)
- Helicostyla bicolorata (I. Lea, 1840)
- Helicostyla boettgeriana (Möllendorff, 1888)
- Helicostyla bullula (Broderip, 1841)
- Helicostyla buschi (L. Pfeiffer, 1846)
- Helicostyla bustoi (Hidalgo, 1887)
- Helicostyla caesar (L. Pfeiffer, 1855)
- Helicostyla calamianica (Quadras Moellendorff, 1894)
- Helicostyla canonizadoi (Bartsch, 1932)
- Helicostyla chocolatina (Poppe, Tagaro & Sarino, 2015)
- Helicostyla cinerosa (L. Pfeiffer, 1855)
- Helicostyla collodes (G. B. Sowerby I, 1841)
- Helicostyla cunctator (Reeve, 1849)
- Helicostyla curta (G. B. Sowerby I, 1841)
- Helicostyla daphnis (Broderip, 1841)
- Helicostyla decorata (Férussac, 1821)
- Helicostyla delicata Fulton, 1903
- Helicostyla dimera (Jonas, 1846)
- Helicostyla domingoi (Bartsch, 1919)
- Helicostyla dimera (Jonas, 1846)
- Helicostyla effusa (Pfeiffer, 1842)
- Helicostyla euconica (Bartsch, 1932)
- Helicostyla fastidiosa (Bartsch, 1932)
- Helicostyla faunus (Broderip, 1841)
- Helicostyla frater (Férussac, 1821)
- Helicostyla fulgens (G. B. Sowerby I, 1841)
- Helicostyla fulgetra (Broderip, 1841)
- Helicostyla gigas (Hidalgo, 1901)
- Helicostyla gilva (Pfeiffer, 1845)
- Helicostyla glaucophthalma (L. Pfeiffer, 1851)
- Helicostyla halichlora (Semper, 1866)
- Helicostyla hololeuca (L. Pfeiffer, 1855)
- Helicostyla huberorum Thach, 2021
- Helicostyla imperator (Pfeiffer, 1848)
- Helicostyla indusiata (L. Pfeiffer, 1871)
- Helicostyla jonasi (L. Pfeiffer, 1846)
- Helicostyla juglans (L. Pfeiffer, 1842)
- Helicostyla lacerata (Semper, 1877) (nomen nudum)
- Helicostyla leai (L. Pfeiffer, 1846)
- Helicostyla leopardus (L. Pfeiffer, 1845)
- Helicostyla leucophaea (G. B. Sowerby I, 1841)
- Helicostyla librosa (L. Pfeiffer, 1857)
- Helicostyla lignaria (L. Pfeiffer, 1842)
- Helicostyla macrostoma (L. Pfeiffer, 1843)
- Helicostyla marinduquensis (Hidalgo, 1887)
- Helicostyla mateoi (Bartsch, 1932)
- Helicostyla mearnsi Bartsch, 1905
- Helicostyla mirabilis (Férussac, 1821)
- Helicostyla montana (C. Semper, 1877)
- Helicostyla mus (Delessert, 1841)
- Helicostyla nobilis (Reeve, 1848)
- Helicostyla nux (C. Semper, 1877)
- Helicostyla okadai Kuroda, 1932
- Helicostyla orbitula (Sowerby, 1841)
- Helicostyla palavanensis (L. Pfeiffer, 1857)
- Helicostyla persimilis (Deshayes, 1850)
- Helicostyla philippinensis (L. Pfeiffer, 1846)
- Helicostyla pictor (Broderip, 1841)
- Helicostyla pithogaster (Ferussac, 1821)
- Helicostyla polita Reeve, 1848
- Helicostyla portii (L. Pfeiffer, 1861)
- Helicostyla rufogaster (Lesson, 1832)
- Helicostyla saranganica (Hidalgo, 1887)
- Helicostyla satyrus (Broderip, 1841)
- Helicostyla schadenbergi (Möllendorff, 1890)
- Helicostyla seckendorffiana (L. Pfeiffer, 1847)
- Helicostyla simonei Thach & F. Huber, 2021
- Helicostyla simplex (Jonas, 1843)
- Helicostyla smaragdina (Reeve, 1842)
- Helicostyla solida (L. Pfeiffer, 1843)
- Helicostyla solivaga (Reeve, 1849)
- Helicostyla speciosa (Jay, 1839)
- Helicostyla tephrodes (L. Pfeiffer, 1843)
- Helicostyla thomsoni (L. Pfeiffer, 1871)
- Helicostyla ticaonica (Broderip, 1841)
- Helicostyla turbo (Pfeiffer, 1845)
- Helicostyla ventricosa (Bruguière, 1792)
- Helicostyla vidali (Hidalgo, 1887)
- Helicostyla villari (Hidalgo, 1887)
- Helicostyla volubilis (Reeve, 1851)
- Helicostyla weberi (Bartsch, 1919)
- Helicostyla woodiana (I. Lea, 1840)
- Helicostyla worcesteri Bartsch, 1909

Species brought into synonymy

- Helicostyla aegle (Broderip, 1841): synonym of Cochlostyla aegle (Broderip, 1841)
- Helicostyla annulata (G.B. Sowerby I, 1841): synonym of Pachysphaera annulata (G. B. Sowerby I, 1841) (unaccepted combination)
- Helicostyla balteata (G.B. Sowerby I, 1841): synonym of Pachysphaera balteata (G. B. Sowerby I, 1841) (unaccepted combination)
- Helicostyla bembicodes (Pfeiffer, 1851): synonym of Helicobulinus bembicodes (L. Pfeiffer, 1851) (unaccepted combination)
- Helicostyla butleri (Pfeiffer, 1842): synonym of Dryocochlias butleri (L. Pfeiffer, 1842) (unaccepted combination)
- Helicostyla camelopardalis (Broderip, 1841): synonym of Hypselostyla camelopardalis (Broderip, 1841) (unaccepted combination)
- Helicostyla carinata (Lea, 1840): synonym of Hypselostyla carinata (I. Lea, 1840) (superseded combination)
- Helicostyla cincinna (G.B. Sowerby I, 1840): synonym of Hypselostyla cincinna (G. B. Sowerby I, 1841) (unaccepted combination)
- Helicostyla cincinniformis (G.B. Sowerb Iy, 1841): synonym of Hypselostyla cincinniformis (G. B. Sowerby I, 1841) (superseded combination)
- Helicostyla collodes (G.B. Sowerby I, 1841): synonym of Cochlostyla collodes (G. B. Sowerby I, 1841) (superseded combination)
- Helicostyla concinna (G.B. Sowerby I, 1841): synonym of Hypselostyla concinna (G. B. Sowerby I, 1841) (unaccepted combination)
- Helicostyla curta (G.B. Sowerby I, 1841) : synonym of Cochlostyla curta (G. B. Sowerby I, 1841) (superseded combination)
- Helicostyla dactylus (Broderip, 1841): synonym of Hypselostyla dactylus (Broderip, 1841) (superseded combination)
- Helicostyla daphnis (Broderip, 1841): synonym of Cochlostyla daphnis (Broderip, 1841) (superseded combination)
- Helicostyla decora (A. Adams & Reeve, 1850): synonym of Cochlodryas decora (A. Adams & Reeve, 1850) (superseded combination)
- Helicostyla denticulata (Jay, 1839): synonym of Calocochlea denticulata (Jay, 1839) (superseded combination)
- Helicostyla dimera (Jonas, 1846): synonym of Cochlostyla dimera (Jonas, 1846) (superseded combination)
- Helicostyla diana (Broderip, 1841): synonym of Hypselostyla diana (Broderip, 1841) (unaccepted combination)
- Helicostyla dubiosa (Pfeiffer, 1846): synonym of Cochlostyla dubiosa (L. Pfeiffer, 1846) (superseded combination
- Helicostyla euconica (Bartsch, 1932): synonym of Cochlostyla effusa (L. Pfeiffer, 1843)
- Helicostyla evanescens (Broderip, 1841): synonym of Hypselostyla evanescens (Broderip, 1841) (unaccepted combination)
- Helicostyla fenestrata (Sowerby I, 1841): synonym of Pachysphaera fenestrata (G. B. Sowerby I, 1841) (superseded combination)
- Helicostyla florida (Sowerby I, 1841): synonym of Cochlodryas florida (G. B. Sowerby I, 1841) (superseded combination)
- Helicostyla fulgens (Broderip, 1841): synonym of Cochlostyla fulgens (G. B. Sowerby I, 1841) (superseded combination)
- Helicostyla fulgetra (Broderip, 1841): synonym of Cochlostyla fulgetra (Broderip, 1841)
- Helicostyla grandis (Pfeiffer, 1845): synonym of Helicobulinus grandis (L. Pfeiffer, 1845) (unaccepted combination)
- Helicostyla hydrophana G.B. Sowerby I, 1841: synonym of Dryocochlias metaformis (Férussac, 1821) (junior synonym)
- Helicostyla ignobilis Sowerby I, 1841: synonym of Cochlodryas ignobilis (G. B. Sowerby I, 1841) (superseded combination)
- Helicostyla iloconensis (Sowerby I, 1841): synonym of Pachysphaera iloconensis (G. B. Sowerby I, 1841) (misspelling of original genus name, Orustia, Mörch, 1852)
- Helicostyla jonasi (Pfeiffer, 1845): synonym of Cochlostyla jonasi (L. Pfeiffer, 1846) (superseded combination)
- Helicostyla juglans (Pfeiffer, 1842): synonym of Cochlostyla juglans (L. Pfeiffer, 1842) (superseded combination)
- Helicostyla leopardus (Pfeiffer, 1845): synonym of Cochlostyla leopardus (L. Pfeiffer, 1845) (superseded combination)
- Helicostyla leucophaea (Sowerby I, 1841): synonym of Cochlostyla leucophaea (G. B. Sowerby I, 1841) (superseded combination)
- Helicostyla lignaria (Pfeiffer, 1842): synonym of Cochlostyla lignaria (L. Pfeiffer, 1842) (suspected synonym)
- Helicostyla macrostoma (Pfeiffer, 1843): synonym of Cochlostyla macrostoma (L. Pfeiffer, 1843) (superseded combination)
- Helicostyla marinduquensis (Hidalgo, 1887): synonym of Cochlostyla marinduquensis Hidalgo, 1887 (superseded combination)
- Helicostyla metaformis (Ferussac, 1821): synonym of Dryocochlias metaformis (Férussac, 1821) (misspelling of original name, Corasia, Albers, 1850)
- Helicostyla mindoroensis W. J. Broderip, 1892 : synonym of Chrysallis mindoroensis (Broderip, 1841) (unaccepted generic combination)
- Helicostyla mirabilis (Ferussac, 1821): synonym of Cochlostyla mirabilis (Férussac, 1821) (superseded combination)
- Helicostyla montana Semper, 1891: synonym of Cochlostyla montana C. Semper, 1877 (superseded combination)
- Helicostyla monticula (G.B. Sowerby I, 1841): synonym of Orustia monticula (G. B. Sowerby I, 1841) (misspelling of original genus name, Orustia, Mörch, 1852)
- Helicostyla nimbosa (Broderip, 1841): synonym of Hypselostyla nimbosa (Broderip, 1841) (unaccepted combination)
- Helicostyla olanivanensis (Bartsch, 1913): synonym of Cochlostyla olanivanensis Bartsch, 1913
- Helicostyla opalina (G.B. Sowerby I, 1841): synonym of Phengus opalinus (G. B. Sowerby I, 1841)
- Helicostyla phaeostyla (Pfeiffer, 1856): synonym of Cochlostyla phaeostyla (L. Pfeiffer, 1857)
- Helicostyla pictor (Broderip, 1841): synonym of Cochlostyla pictor (Broderip, 1841) (superseded combination)
- Helicostyla polillensis (Pfeiffer, 1861): synonym of Cochlostyla polillensis (L. Pfeiffer, 1861) accepted as Calocochlea polillensis (L. Pfeiffer, 1861)
- Helicostyla pudibunda Semper, 1891: synonym of Pfeifferia pudibunda (C. Semper, 1877) (unaccepted combination)
- Helicostyla rehbeini (L. Pfeiffer, 1852): synonym of Dryocochlias rehbeini (L. Pfeiffer, 1852) (unaccepted combination)
- Helicostyla rufogaster (Lesson, 1831): synonym of Cochlostyla rufogaster (Lesson, 1832) (superseded combination)
- Helicostyla rustica (Mousson, 1849): synonym of Dryocochlias metaformis rustica (Mousson, 1849)
- Helicostyla sarcinosa (Ferussac, 1821): synonym of Helicobulinus sarcinosa (Férussac, 1821)
- Helicostyla satyra (Broderip, 1841): synonym of Cochlostyla satyrus (Broderip, 1841) (superseded combination)
- Helicostyla simplex (Jonas, 1843): synonym of Cochlostyla simplex (Jonas, 1843) (superseded combination)
- Helicostyla solivaga (Reeve, 1849): synonym of Cochlostyla solivaga (Reeve, 1849) (superseded combination)
- Helicostyla sphaerica (Sowerby I, 1841): synonym of Pachysphaera sphaerica (G. B. Sowerby I, 1841)
- Helicostyla submirabilis Möllendorff, 1897: synonym of Cochlostyla submirabilis Möllendorff, 1897 (unaccepted combination)
- * Helicostyla turbinoides (Broderip, 1841): synonym of Helicobulinus turbinoides (Broderip, 1841) (superseded combination)
- Helicostyla velata (Broderip, 1841): synonym of Hypselostyla velata (W.J. Broderip, 1841)
- Helicostyla ventricosa (Bruguière, 1792): synonym of Cochlostyla ventricosa (Bruguière, 1792) (superseded combination)
- Helicostyla viridostriata (Lea, 1840): synonym of Cochlodryas viridostriata (I. Lea, 1840) (superseded combination)
- Helicostyla woodiana (Lea, 1840): synonym of Cochlostyla woodiana (I. Lea, 1840) (superseded combination)
