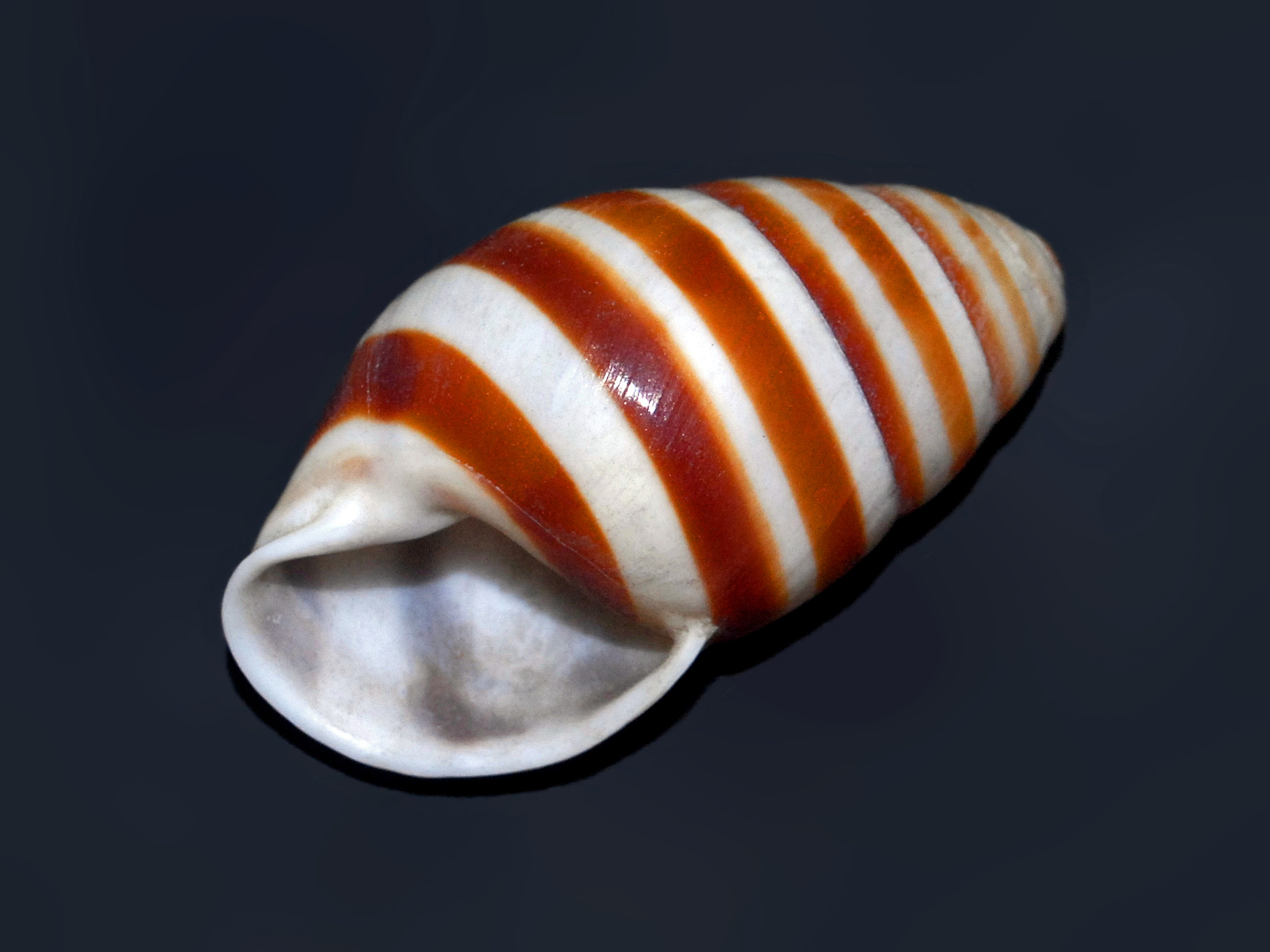
- Apertural view of a shell of Cochlostyla ovoidea from the Philippines

Scientific classification
- Kingdom: Animalia
- Phylum: Mollusca
- Class: Gastropoda
- Order: Stylommatophora
- Family: Camaenidae
- Subfamily: Helicostylinae
- Genus: Cochlostyla; Férussac, 1821

Type species
- Bulimus ovoideus Bruguière, 1789

Species
- See text

Synonyms
- Bulimus (Canistrum) Mörch, 1852; Bulimus (Orthostylus) H. Beck, 1837 (junior synonym); Canistrum Mörch, 1852; Chromocochlea W. Hartmann, 1842; Cochlodryas E. von Martens, 1860; Cochlostyla (Canistrum) Mörch, 1852; Cochlostyla (Cochlodryas) Martens, 1860· accepted, alternate representation; Cochlostyla (Cochlostyla) A. Férussac, 1821· accepted, alternate representation; Cochlostyla (Dryocochlias) Möllendorff, 1898· accepted, alternate representation; Cochlostyla (Halocochlea) P. Bartsch, 1932· accepted, alternate representation; Cochlostyla (Helicobulinus) Broderip, 1841· accepted, alternate representation; Cochlostyla (Orustia) Mörch, 1852· accepted, alternate representation; Cochlostyla (Rhymbocochlias) Möllendorff, 1895 (junior synonym); Coenobita Gistel, 1848; Dryocochlias Möllendorff, 1898; Helicobulimus Möllendorff, 1890; Helicobulinus Broderip, 1841; Helicostyla (Pachysphaera) Pilsbry, 1892 (junior synonym); Helix (Cochlostyla) A. Férussac, 1821; Hypselostyla L. Pfeiffer, 1868 (unavailable; introduced in synonymy); Orthostylus H. Beck, 1837; Orustia Mörch, 1852; Pachysphaera Pilsbry, 1892 (junior synonym); Poecilus Albers, 1860; Pythohelix Swainson, 1840; Rhymbocochlias Möllendorff, 1895 (junior synonym)

= Cochlostyla =

Genus of gastropods

Cochlostyla is a genus of small, air-breathing land snails, terrestrial pulmonate gastropod molluscs in the family Camaenidae, subfamily Helicostylinae.

== Species ==
Species within the genus Cochlostyla include:

- Cochlostyla acuminata (G. B. Sowerby I, 1841)
- Cochlostyla aegle (Broderip, 1841)
- Cochlostyla albaiensis (G. B. Sowerby I, 1840)
- Cochlostyla annae O. Semper, 1862
- Cochlostyla annulata (G. B. Sowerby I, 1841)
- Cochlostyla aopta (Clench & Archer, 1933)
- Cochlostyla aplomorpha (Jonas, 1843)
- Cochlostyla balanoides (Jonas, 1843)
- Cochlostyla balteata (G. B. Sowerby I, 1841)
- Cochlostyla belcheri (L. Pfeiffer, 1851)
- Cochlostyla bembicodes (L. Pfeiffer, 1852)
- Cochlostyla bicolorata (I. Lea, 1840)
  - Cochlostyla bicolorata amaliae
- Cochlostyla boettgeriana Möllendorff, 1888
- Cochlostyla bopolonsis
- Cochlostyla brevicula (L. Pfeiffer, 1842)
- Cochlostyla bruguieriana (L. Pfeiffer, 1845)
- Cochlostyla buschi (L. Pfeiffer, 1846)
- Cochlostyla bustoi Hidalgo, 1887
- Cochlostyla butleri (L. Pfeiffer, 1852)
- Cochlostyla caesar (L. Pfeiffer, 1855)
- Cochlostyla cailliaudi (Deshayes, 1839)
- Cochlostyla calista
- Cochlostyla calypso (Broderip, 1841)
- Cochlostyla camelopardalis (Broderip, 1841)
- Cochlostyla chlorochroa (G. B. Sowerby I, 1841)
- Cochlostyla carinata
- Cochlostyla chrysallidiformis
- Cochlostyla chrysocheila (G. B. Sowerby I, 1841)
- Cochlostyla cincinniformis (G. B. Sowerby I, 1841)
- Cochlostyla cinerascensis (L. Pfeiffer, 1845)
- Cochlostyla cinerosa (L. Pfeiffer, 1855)
- Cochlostyla coccomelos (G. B. Sowerby I, 1841)
- Cochlostyla concinnus (G. B. Sowerby I, 1841)
- Cochlostyla contracta
- Cochlostyla coronadoi (Hidalgo, 1868)
- Cochlostyla cossmanniana Crosse, 1886 (taxon inquirendum)
- Cochlostyla cryptica (Broderip, 1841)
- Cochlostyla cumingi (L. Pfeiffer, 1855)
- Cochlostyla curta (G. B. Sowerby I, 1841)
- Cochlostyla damahoyi (L. Pfeiffer, 1857)
- Cochlostyla daphnis
- Cochlostyla dattaensis O. Semper, 1866
- Cochlostyla decoarata (Férussac, 1821)
- Cochlostyla decora (A. Adams & Reeve, 1850)
- Cochlostyla denticulata (Jay, 1839)
- Cochlostyla depressa C. Semper, 1887
- Cochlostyla diana (Broderip, 1841)
- Cochlostyla difficilis (L. Pfeiffer, 1854)
- Cochlostyla dilatata (L. Pfeiffer, 1846)
- Cochlostyla dimera (Jonas, 1846)
- Cochlostyla dubiosa (L. Pfeiffer, 1845)
- Cochlostyla dumonti (L. Pfeiffer, 1846)
- Cochlostyla eburnea (Reeve, 1848)
- Cochlostyla effusa (L. Pfeiffer, 1855)
- Cochlostyla electrica
- Cochlostyla elerae Möllendorff, 1896
- Cochlostyla evanescens (Broderip, 1841)
- Cochlostyla fenestrata (G. B. Sowerby I, 1841)
- Cochlostyla festiva (Donovan, 1825)
- Cochlostyla fictilis (Broderip, 1841)
- Cochlostyla florida (G. B. Sowerby I, 1841)
- Cochlostyla frater (Férussac, 1821)
- Cochlostyla fulgens (G. B. Sowerby I, 1842)
- Cochlostyla fulgetrum
- Cochlostyla fuliginata Martens, 1873
- Cochlostyla generalis (L. Pfeiffer, 1854)
- Cochlostyla gilberti Quadras & Möllendorff, 1896
- Cochlostyla gilva
- Cochlostyla glaucophthalma (L. Pfeiffer, 1851)
- Cochlostyla globosula Möllendorff, 1894
- Cochlostyla gmeliniana (L. Pfeiffer, 1845)
- Cochlostyla halichlora C. Semper, 1866
- Cochlostyla harfordii (Broderip, 1841)
- Cochlostyla hemisphaerion (L. Pfeiffer, 1850)
- Cochlostyla hidalgoi Möllendorff, 1894
- Cochlostyla hololeuca (L. Pfeiffer, 1855)
- Cochlostyla ignobilis (G. B. Sowerby I, 1841)
- Cochlostyla iloconensis (G. B. Sowerby I, 1841)
- Cochlostyla incompta (G. B. Sowerby I, 1841)
- Cochlostyla intorta (G. B. Sowerby I, 1840)
- Cochlostyla irosinensis (Hidalgo, 1887)
- Cochlostyla jonasi (L. Pfeiffer, 1846)
- Cochlostyla lacera (L. Pfeiffer, 1854)
- Cochlostyla lalloensis (L. Pfeiffer, 1855)
- Cochlostyla lamellicostis Möllendorff, 1895
- Cochlostyla leai (L. Pfeiffer, 1847)
- Cochlostyla leopardus (L. Pfeiffer, 1845)
- Cochlostyla leucauchen Möllendorff, 1895
- Cochlostyla leucophaea (G. B. Sowerby I, 1841)
- Cochlostyla librosa (L. Pfeiffer, 1857)
- Cochlostyla lignaria
- Cochlostyla lillianae P. Bartsch, 1932
- Cochlostyla limansauensis C. Semper, 1873
- Cochlostyla lividocincta
- Cochlostyla luzonica (L. Pfeiffer, 1855)
- Cochlostyla macrostoma (L. Pfeiffer, 1842)
- Cochlostyla magtanensis C. Semper, 1873
- Cochlostyla marinduquensis
- Cochlostyla martensi Möllendorff, 1898
- Cochlostyla matruelis (G. B. Sowerby I, 1841)
- Cochlostyla melanocheila (L. Pfeiffer, 1842)
- Cochlostyla melanoraphe Quadras & Möllendorff, 1896
- Cochlostyla metaformis (Férussac, 1821)
- Cochlostyla metallorum Möllendorff, 1898
- Cochlostyla microspira (L. Pfeiffer, 1853)
- Cochlostyla mindorensis
- Cochlostyla mirabilis
- Cochlostyla montana C. Semper, 1887
- Cochlostyla montfortiana (L. Pfeiffer, 1847)
- Cochlostyla monticula (G. B. Sowerby I, 1841)
- Cochlostyla mus (Broderip, 1841)
- Cochlostyla nimbosa (Broderip, 1841)
- Cochlostyla nobilis (Reeve, 1848)
- Cochlostyla norrisii (L. Pfeiffer, 1842)
- Cochlostyla obtusa (L. Pfeiffer, 1845)
- Cochlostyla opalina (G. B. Sowerby I, 1841)
- Cochlostyla orbitula (G. B. Sowerby I, 1841)
- Cochlostyla ovoidea (Bruguière, 1789)
- Cochlostyla palavanensis (L. Pfeiffer, 1857)
- Cochlostyla pan (Broderip, 1841)
- Cochlostyla partuloides
- Cochlostyla perpallida P. Bartsch, 1932
- Cochlostyla phaeostyla (L. Pfeiffer, 1856)
- Cochlostyla philippinensis
- Cochlostyla pictor (Broderip, 1841)
- Cochlostyla pithogaster
- Cochlostyla polillensis (L. Pfeiffer, 1861)
- Cochlostyla polychroa (G. B. Sowerby I, 1841)
- Cochlostyla portei (L. Pfeiffer, 1856)
- Cochlostyla pulchella Möllendorff, 1893
- Cochlostyla pulcherrima (G. B. Sowerby I, 1841)
- Cochlostyla pyramidalis (G. B. Sowerby I, 1841)
- Cochlostyla quadrasi
- Cochlostyla quadrifasciata Hidalgo, 1896
- Cochlostyla rehbeini (L. Pfeiffer, 1852)
- Cochlostyla retusa (L. Pfeiffer, 1845)
- Cochlostyla roebeleni Möllendorff, 1894
- Cochlostyla roissyana (Férussac, 1822)
- Cochlostyla rufogaster (Lesson, 1832)
- Cochlostyla samarensis C. Semper, 1873
- Cochlostyla saranganica Möllendorff, 1890
- Cochlostyla sarcinosa (Férussac, 1821)
- Cochlostyla satyrus (Broderip, 1841)
- Cochlostyla semperi Möllendorff, 1893
- Cochlostyla senckendorffiana (L. Pfeiffer, 1847)
- Cochlostyla simplex (Jonas, 1843)
- Cochlostyla smaragdina (Reeve, 1842)
- Cochlostyla solivaga (Reeve, 1848)
- Cochlostyla sphaerica (G. B. Sowerby I, 1841)
- Cochlostyla sphaerion (G. B. Sowerby I, 1841)
- Cochlostyla stabilis (G. B. Sowerby I, 1841)
- Cochlostyla streptostoma Möllendorff, 1893
- Cochlostyla subcarinata (L. Pfeiffer, 1855)
- Cochlostyla succincta (Reeve, 1848)
- Cochlostyla suprabadia C. Semper, 1874
- Cochlostyla tenera (G. B. Sowerby I, 1841)
- Cochlostyla tephrodes (L. Pfeiffer, 1842)
- Cochlostyla ticaonica
- Cochlostyla trisculpta Möllendorff, 1894
- Cochlostyla turbinoides (Broderip, 1841)
- Cochlostyla turbo (L. Pfeiffer, 1845)
- Cochlostyla uber (L. Pfeiffer, 1842)
- Cochlostyla unica (L. Pfeiffer, 1842)
- Cochlostyla valenciennii (Eydoux, 1838)
- Cochlostyla vantricosa
- Cochlostyla velata (Broderip, 1841)
- Cochlostyla versicolor Möllendorff, 1894
- Cochlostyla virginiea (I. Lea, 1841)
- Cochlostyla weberi P. Bartsch, 1919
- Cochlostyla woodiana (I. Lea, 1840)
  - Cochlostyla woodiana ingens
  - Cochlostyla woodiana reevei
- Cochlostyla woodianus
- Cochlostyla worcesteri P. Bartsch, 1909
- Cochlostyla xanthobasis Pilsbry, 1891
- Cochlostyla zonifera (L. Pfeiffer, 1842)
