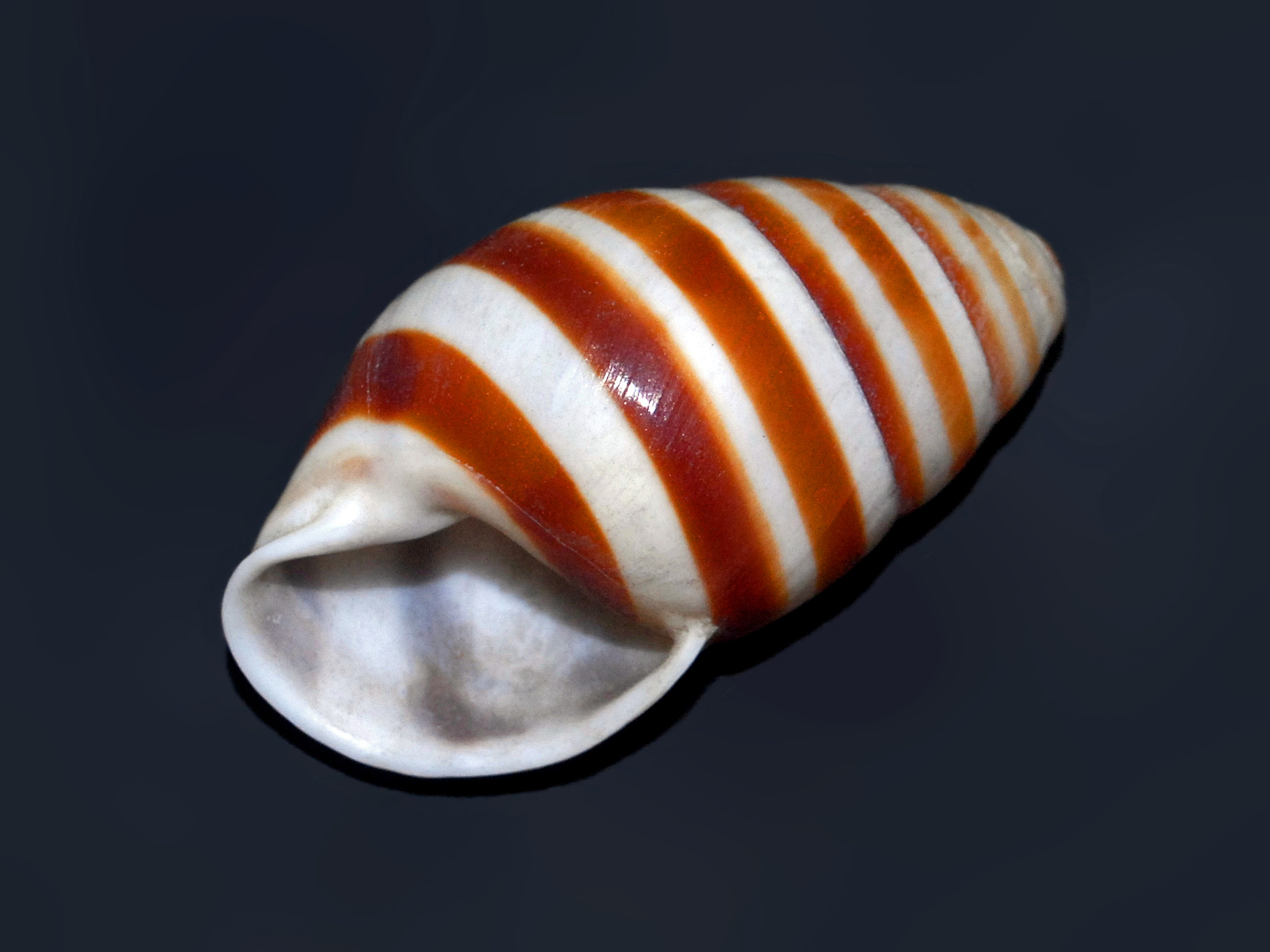
- A shell of Cochlostyla ovoidea from the Philippines

Scientific classification
- Kingdom: Animalia
- Phylum: Mollusca
- Class: Gastropoda
- Order: Stylommatophora
- Family: Camaenidae
- Genus: Cochlostyla
- Species: C. ovoidea

Binomial name
- Cochlostyla ovoidea (Bruguière, 1789)

= Cochlostyla ovoidea =

Species of gastropod

Cochlostyla ovoidea is a species of small, air-breathing land snail, a terrestrial pulmonate gastropod mollusks in the family Camaenidae, subfamily Helicostylinae. This species can be found in the Philippines.
