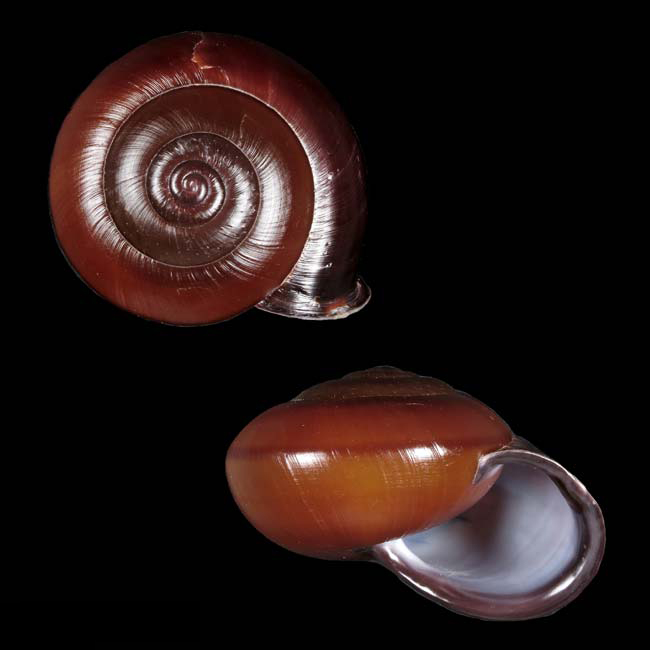

Scientific classification
- Kingdom: Animalia
- Phylum: Mollusca
- Class: Gastropoda
- Order: Stylommatophora
- Family: Camaenidae
- Genus: Helicostyla
- Species: H. chocolatina

Binomial name
- Helicostyla chocolatina (Poppe, Tagaro & Sarino, 2015)

Synonyms
- Calocochlia chocolatina Poppe, Tagaro & Sarino, 2015; Cochlostyla chocolatina (Poppe, Tagaro & Sarino, 2015); Helicostyla (Calocochlea) chocolatina (Poppe, Tagaro & Sarino, 2015)

= Helicostyla chocolatina =

Species of gastropod

Helicostyla chocolatina is a species of land snail, a gastropod mollusc in the family Camaenidae.

== Original description information ==
Poppe, G. T., Tagaro, S. P. & Sarino, J. 2015 A new Bradybaenidae and Two new Diplommatinidae from the Philippines. — Visaya Germany (ConchBooks. Hackenheim.) Vol. 4(3): 4-14, 4 pls.
