= Chrysallis (gastropod) =

Scientific classification
- Kingdom: Animalia
- Phylum: Mollusca
- Class: Gastropoda
- Order: Stylommatophora
- Superfamily: Helicoidea
- Family: Camaenidae
- Subfamily: Helicostylinae
- Genus: Chrysallis; Albers, 1850

Type species
- Bulinus chrysalidiformis G. B. Sowerby I, 1833

Synonyms
- Bulimus (Chrysallis) Albers, 1850 (original rank); Chrysalis auct. (incorrect subsequent spelling); Cochlostyla (Chrysalis) Albers, 1850 (unjustified emendation of original subgenus name, Chrysallis Albers, 1850); Cochlostyla (Chrysallis) Albers, 1850; Helicostyla (Chrysallis) Albers, 1850 (unaccepted generic combination)

Genus of gastropods

Chrysallis is a genus of small, air-breathing land snails, terrestrial pulmonate gastropod mollusks in the subfamily Helicostylinae of the family Camaenidae.

== Species ==
- Chrysallis albolabris Bartsch, 1932
- Chrysallis antonii (C. Semper, 1877)
- Chrysallis aspersa (Grateloup, 1840)
- Chrysallis caniceps Bartsch, 1932
- Chrysallis chrysalidiformis (G. B. Sowerby I, 1833)
- Chrysallis corrugata Bartsch, 1932
- Chrysallis electrica (Reeve, 1848)
- Chrysallis jayi Bartsch, 1932
- Chrysallis lichnifer (Mörch, 1850)
- Chrysallis mindoroensis (Broderip, 1841)
- Chrysallis nigriceps Bartsch, 1932
- Chrysallis palliobasis Bartsch, 1932
- Chrysallis perturbator Bartsch, 1932
- Chrysallis pettiti Bartsch, 1932
- Chrysallis rollei (Möllendorff, 1898)
- Chrysallis roseolabra (Bartsch, 1932)

Species brought into synonymy

- Chrysallis antoni (C. Semper, 1877) accepted as Chrysallis antonii (C. Semper, 1877) (misspelling of species name)
