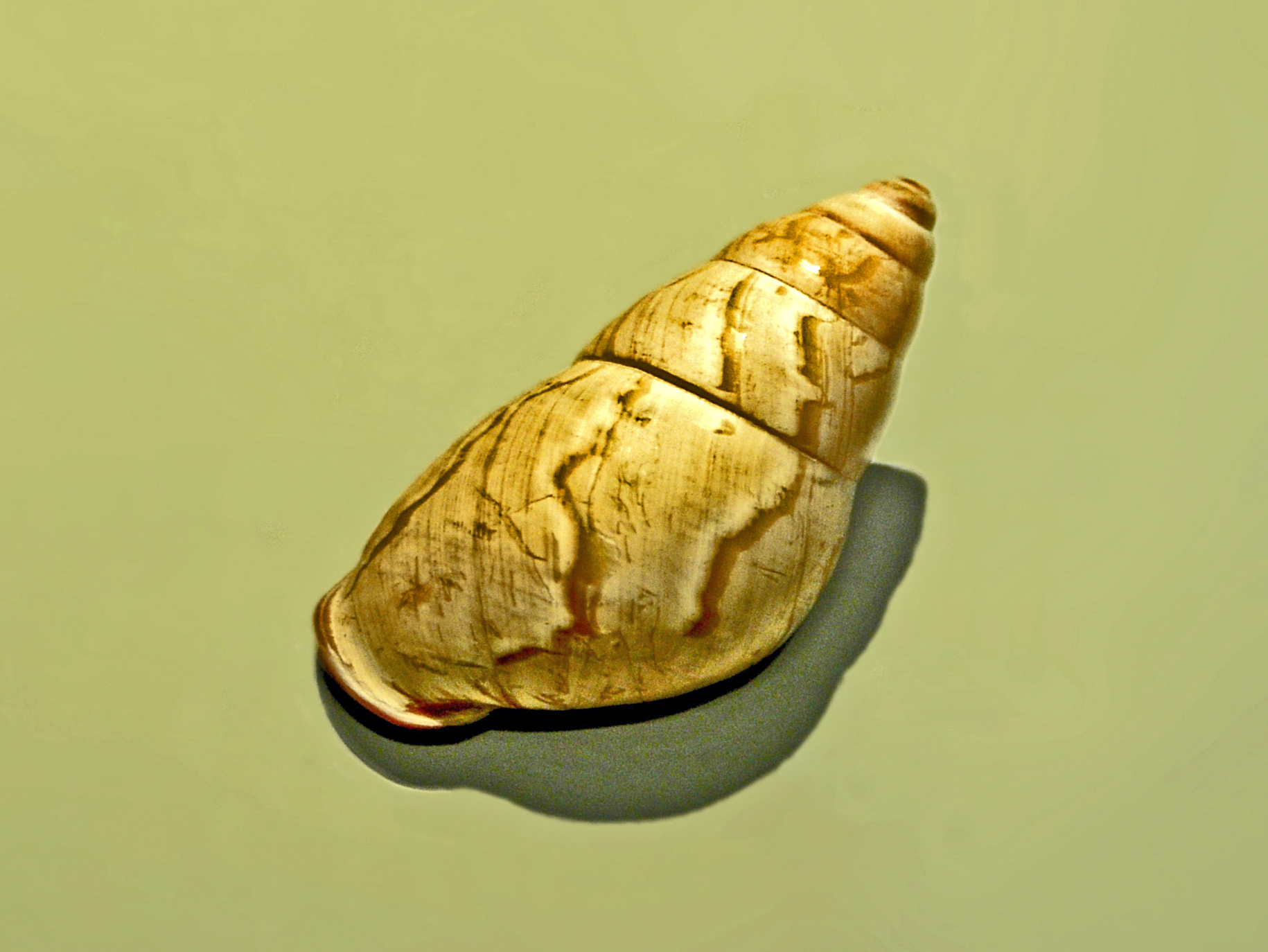
- Shell of Helicostyla nobilis from Guimaras, (Philippines), on display at the Museo Civico di Storia Naturale di Milano

Scientific classification
- Kingdom: Animalia
- Phylum: Mollusca
- Class: Gastropoda
- Order: Stylommatophora
- Family: Camaenidae
- Genus: Helicostyla
- Species: H. nobilis

Binomial name
- Helicostyla nobilis (Reeve, 1848)

Synonyms
- Bulimus nobilis Reeve, 1848; Cochlostyla (Dryocochlias) nobilis (Reeve, 1848) (superseded combination)

= Helicostyla nobilis =

Species of gastropod

Helicostyla nobilis is a species of medium-sized, air-breathing land snail, a terrestrial pulmonate gastropod mollusk in the family Camaenidae.

This species can be found in the Philippines. Shells can reach a length of about 60 millimetres (2.4 in).
