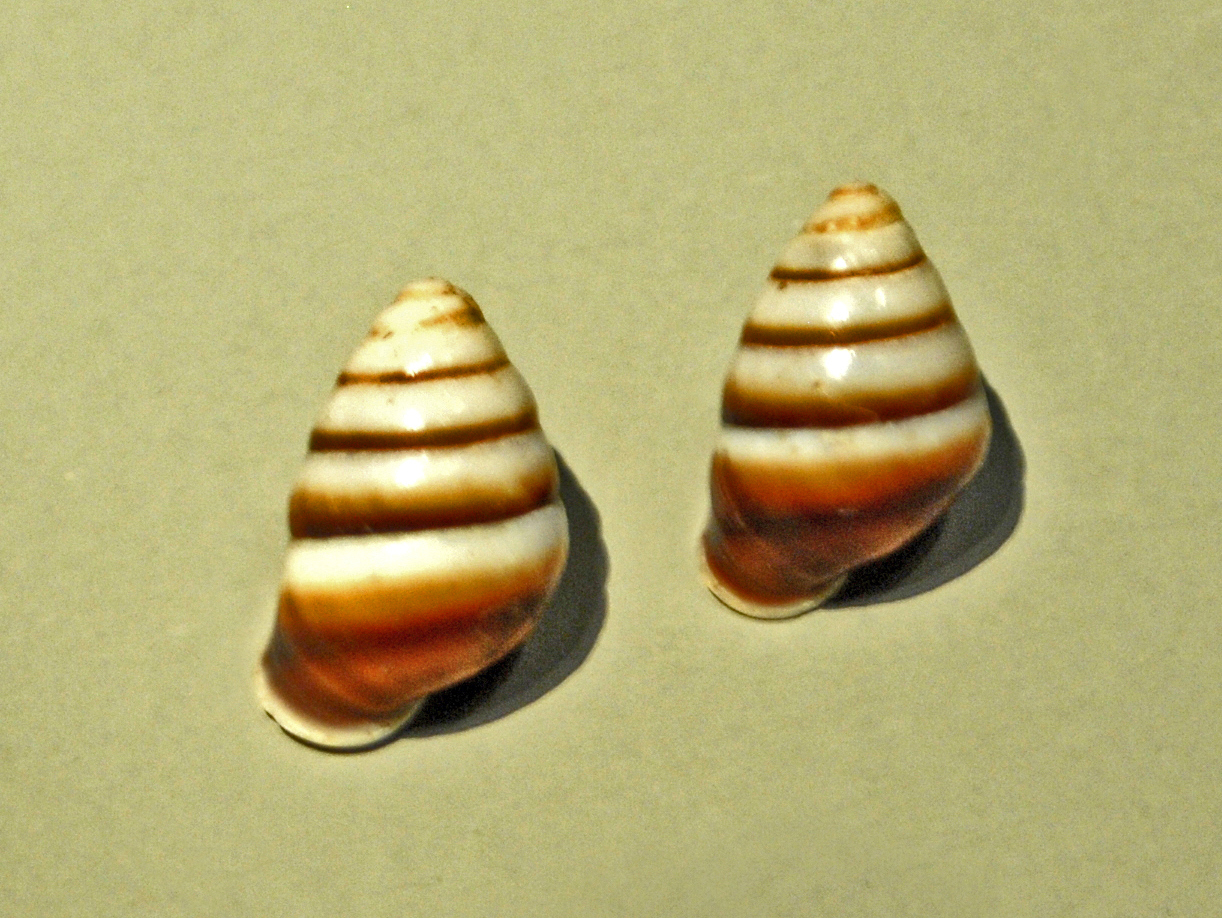
- Shells of Cochlostyla stabile on display at the Museo Civico di Storia Naturale di Milano

Scientific classification
- Kingdom: Animalia
- Phylum: Mollusca
- Class: Gastropoda
- Order: Stylommatophora
- Family: Camaenidae
- Genus: Cochlostyla
- Species: C. stabilis

Binomial name
- Cochlostyla stabilis (G. B. Sowerby I, 1841)

Synonyms
- Calocochlea stabilis (G. B. Sowerby I, 1841); Canistrum stabilis (G. B. Sowerby I, 1841); Cochlostyla (Canistrum) stabilis (G. B. Sowerby I, 1841); Helix stabilis G. B. Sowerby I, 1841

= Cochlostyla stabilis =

Species of gastropod

Cochlostyla stabilis is a species of air-breathing land snail, a terrestrial pulmonate gastropod mollusc in the family Camaenidae. This species is found in the Philippine Islands.

The shells of this species can reach a length of about 35 millimetres (1.4 in).
