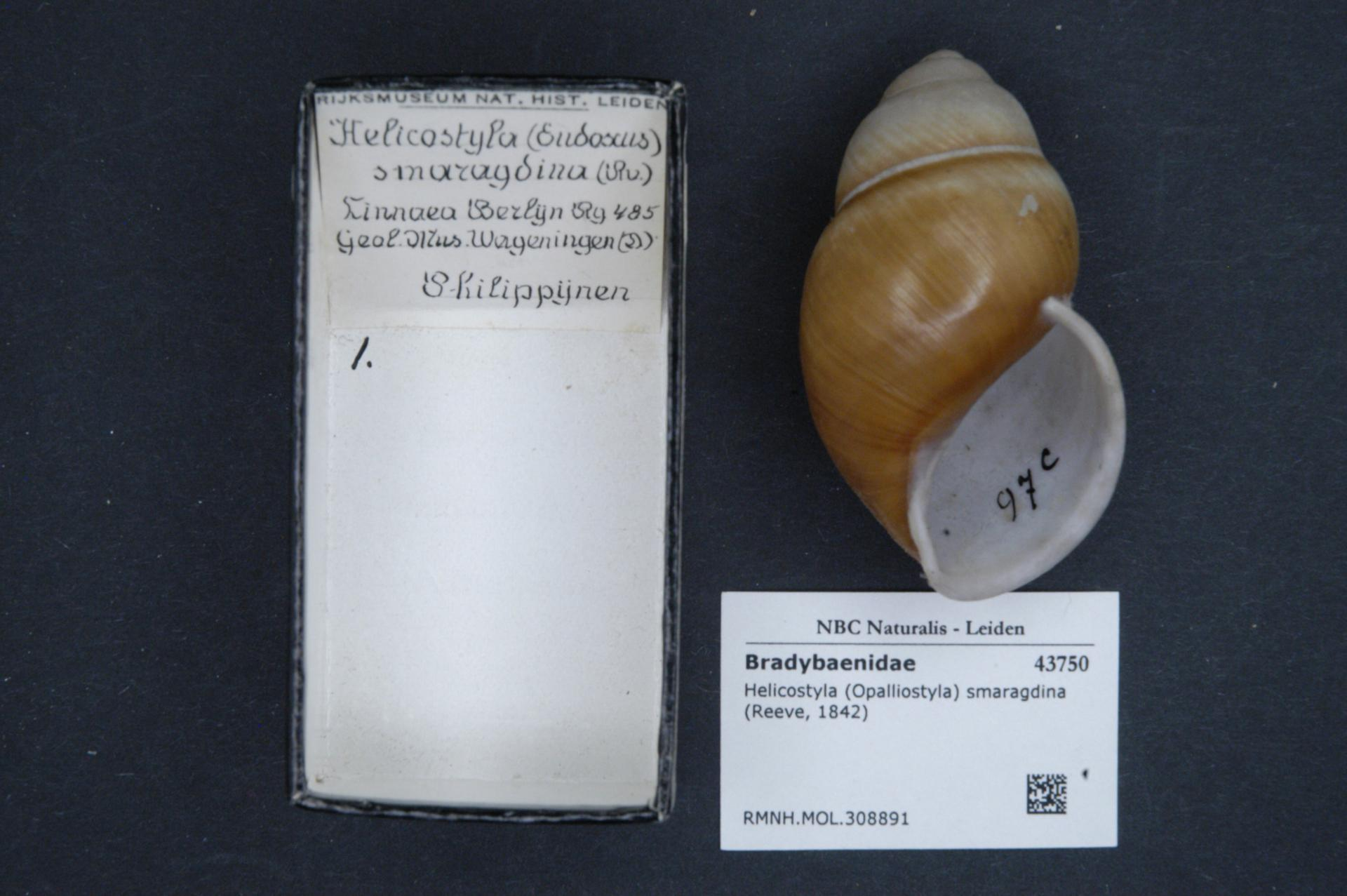

Conservation status
- Critically Endangered (IUCN 2.3)

Scientific classification
- Domain: Eukaryota
- Kingdom: Animalia
- Phylum: Mollusca
- Class: Gastropoda
- Order: Stylommatophora
- Family: Camaenidae
- Genus: Cochlostyla
- Species: C. smaragdina

Binomial name
- Cochlostyla smaragdina (Reeve, 1842)

= Cochlostyla smaragdina =

Species of gastropod

Cochlostyla smaragdina is a species of small, air-breathing land snails, terrestrial pulmonate gastropod mollusks, in the family Camaenidae endemic to the Philippines. The specific name "smaragdina" comes from "smaragdus," Latin for "emerald," and refers to the brilliant green of mature specimens. This name is commonly misspelled as "smargadina," an error which has propagated through multiple databases.
