= Dryocochlias =

Scientific classification
- Kingdom: Animalia
- Phylum: Mollusca
- Class: Gastropoda
- Order: Stylommatophora
- Superfamily: Helicoidea
- Family: Camaenidae
- Subfamily: Helicostylinae
- Genus: Dryocochlias; Möllendorff, 1898

Type species
- Helix metaformis Férussac, 1821

Synonyms
- Cochlostyla (Dryocochlias) Möllendorff, 1898 (superseded combination)

Genus of gastropods

Dryocochlias is a genus of small, air-breathing land snails, terrestrial pulmonate gastropod mollusks in the subfamily Helicostylinae of the family Camaenidae.

== Species ==
- Dryocochlias butleri (L. Pfeiffer, 1842)
- Dryocochlias lacera (L. Pfeiffer, 1854)
- Dryocochlias languida (L. Pfeiffer, 1843)
- Dryocochlias metaformis (Férussac, 1821)
- Dryocochlias rehbeini (L. Pfeiffer, 1852)
- Dryocochlias unica (L. Pfeiffer, 1843)
