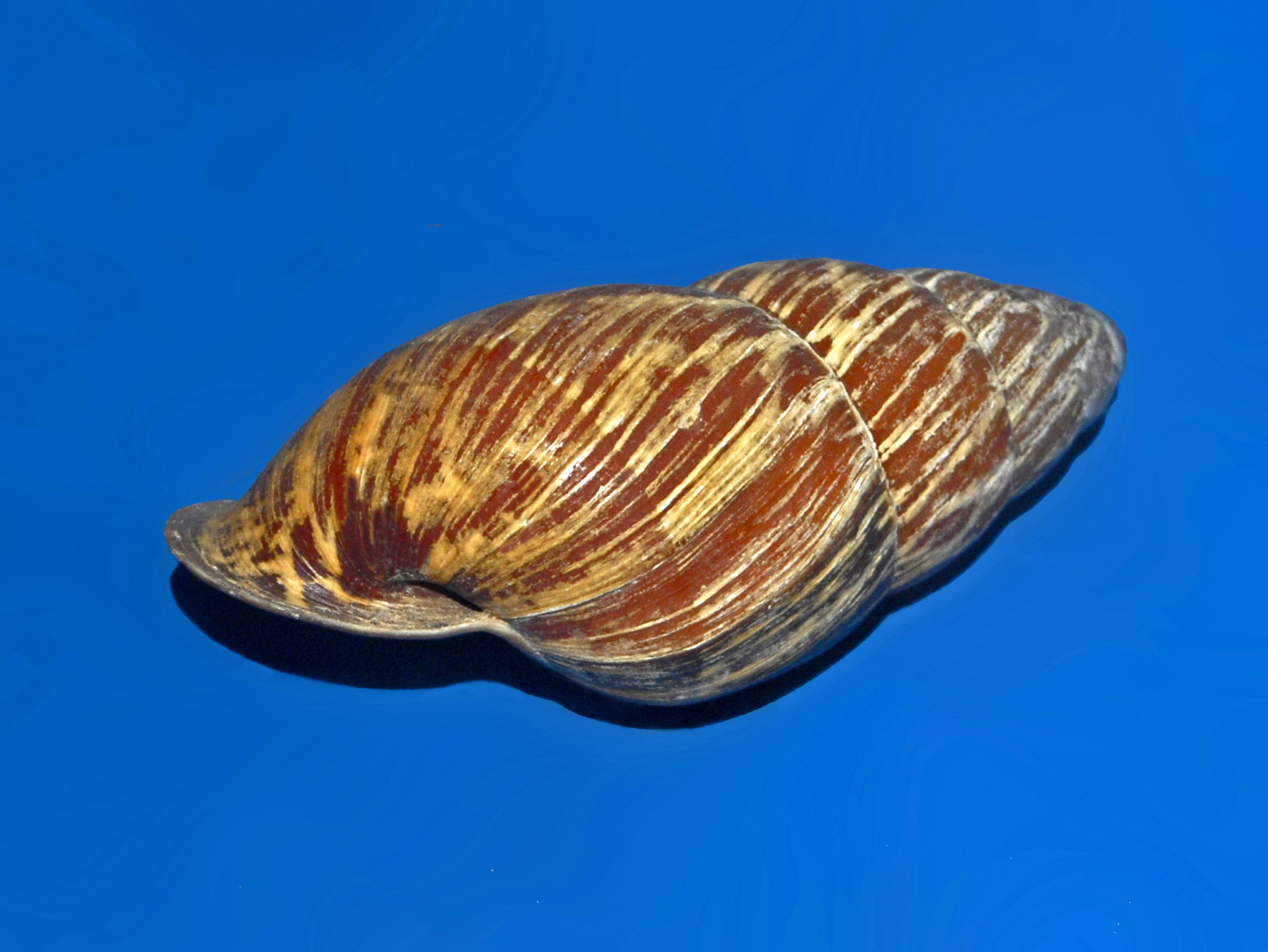
- A shell of Chrysallis mindoroensis on display at the Museo Civico di Storia Naturale di Milano

Scientific classification
- Kingdom: Animalia
- Phylum: Mollusca
- Class: Gastropoda
- Order: Stylommatophora
- Family: Camaenidae
- Genus: Chrysallis
- Species: C. mindoroensis

Binomial name
- Chrysallis mindoroensis W. J. Broderip, 1892

Synonyms
- Bulimus melanogaster Mörch, 1852 (junior synonym); Bulinus mindoroensis Broderip, 1841 (original combination); Cochlostyla (Chrysalis) mindoroensis (Broderip, 1841) (superseded combination); Cochlostyla melanogaster (Mörch, 1852) (junior synonym); Cochlostyla mindoroensis (Broderip, 1841) (superseded combination); Helicostyla (Chrysallis) mindoroensis (Broderip, 1841) (unaccepted generic combination)

= Chrysallis mindoroensis =

Species of gastropod

Chrysallis mindoroensis is a species of medium-sized, air-breathing land snail, a terrestrial pulmonate gastropod mollusk in the family Camaenidae.

== Distribution ==
This terrestrial species is found in Mindoro, Philippines.
