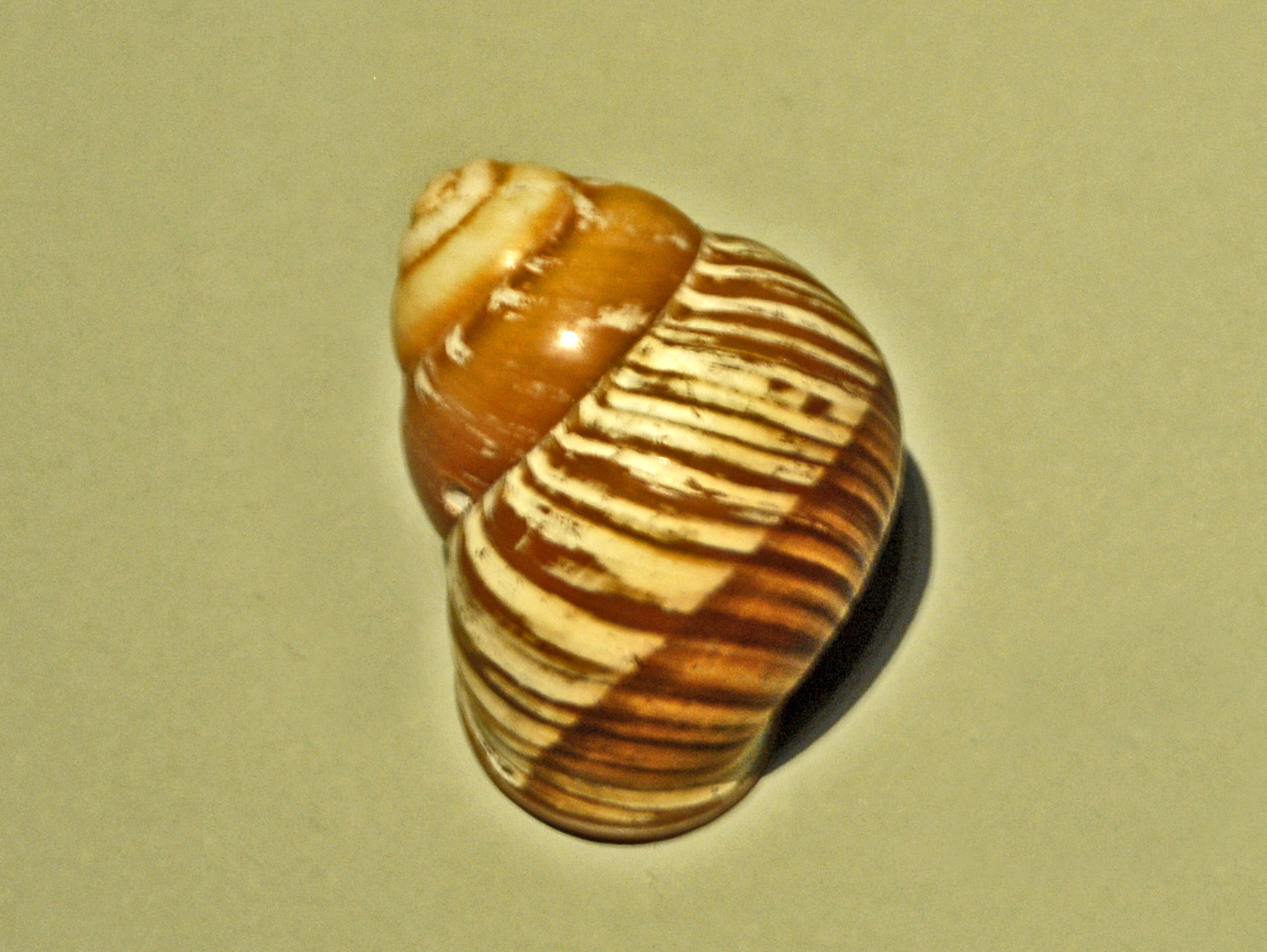
- A shell of Helicostyla ticaonica on display at the Museo Civico di Storia Naturale di Milano

Scientific classification
- Kingdom: Animalia
- Phylum: Mollusca
- Class: Gastropoda
- Order: Stylommatophora
- Family: Camaenidae
- Genus: Helicostyla
- Species: H. ticaonica

Binomial name
- Helicostyla ticaonica (W. J. Broderip, 1841)

Synonyms
- Bulimus subglobosus I. Lea, 1840 (original combination); Cochlostyla (Orthostylus) subglobosa (I. Lea, 1840) (junior synonym); Cochlostyla (Orthostylus) ticaonica (Broderip, 1841) (superseded combination); Cochlostyla (Orthostylus) ticaonica f. lutea Pilsbry, 1891 (color form); Cochlostyla subglobosa (I. Lea, 1840) (junior synonym); Cochlostyla ticaonica (Broderip, 1841) (unaccepted combination); Helicostyla (Orthostylus) subglobosa (I. Lea, 1840) · unaccepted (junior synonym); Helicostyla (Orthostylus) ticaonica (Broderip, 1841) · unaccepted (unaccepted combination); Helix (Cochlostyla) ticaonica Broderip, 1841 (original combination); Helix ticaonica Broderip, 1841 (superseded combination)

= Helicostyla ticaonica =

Species of gastropod

Helicostyla ticaonica is a species of medium-sized, air-breathing land snail, a terrestrial pulmonate gastropod mollusc in the family Camaenidae.

Subspecies

- Helicostyla ticaonica iloilana M. Smith, 1932
- Helicostyla ticaonica ticaonica (Broderip, 1841)

This species can be found in the Philippines. Shells can reach a length of about 55 millimetres (2.2 in).
