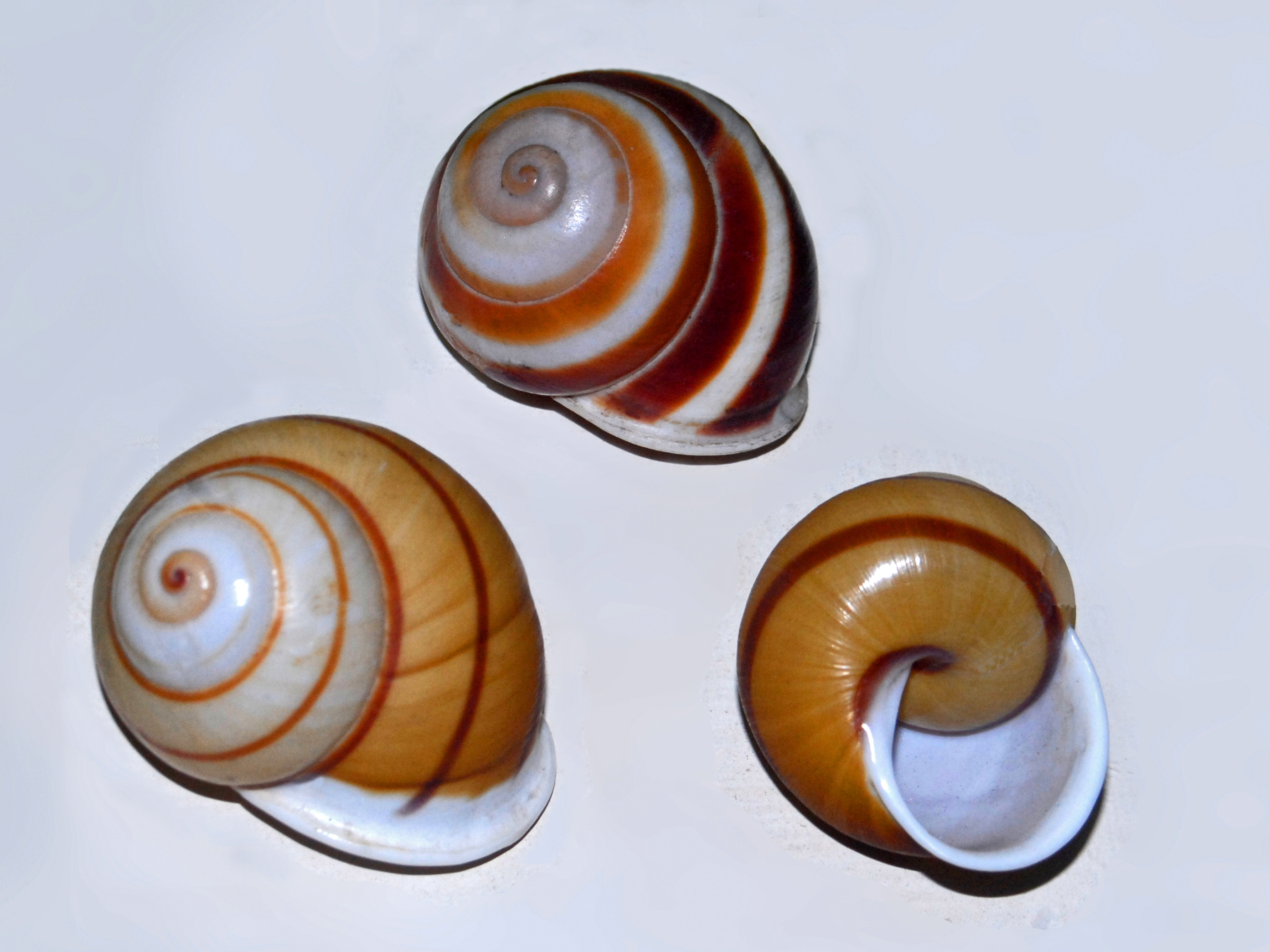
- Shells of Cochlostyla mirabilis from Philippines

Scientific classification
- Kingdom: Animalia
- Phylum: Mollusca
- Class: Gastropoda
- Order: Stylommatophora
- Family: Camaenidae
- Genus: Cochlostyla
- Species: C. mirabilis

Binomial name
- Cochlostyla mirabilis (Ferussac, 1821)

Synonyms
- Cochlostyla (Callicochlias) mirabilis (Férussac, 1821) (superseded combination); Cochlostyla (Callicochlias) mirabilis trichroa Pilsbry, 1892 (superseded combination); Cochlostyla (Helicostyla) mirabilis (Férussac, 1821) (superseded combination); Cochlostyla (Helicostyla) mirabilis f. trichroa Pilsbry, 1892 (original combination); Helicostyla (Helicostyla) mirabilis (Férussac, 1821) (superseded combination); Helicostyla mirabilis (Férussac, 1821) (superseded combination); Helix formosa W. Wood, 1828 (junior synonym); Helix galactites Lamarck, 1822 (junior synonym); Helix mirabilis Férussac, 1821 (original combination)

= Cochlostyla mirabilis =

Species of gastropod

Cochlostyla mirabilis is a species of small, air-breathing land snail, a terrestrial pulmonate gastropod mollusk in the family Camaenidae, subfamily Helicostylinae.

== Distribution ==
This terrestrial species can be found in the Philippines.
