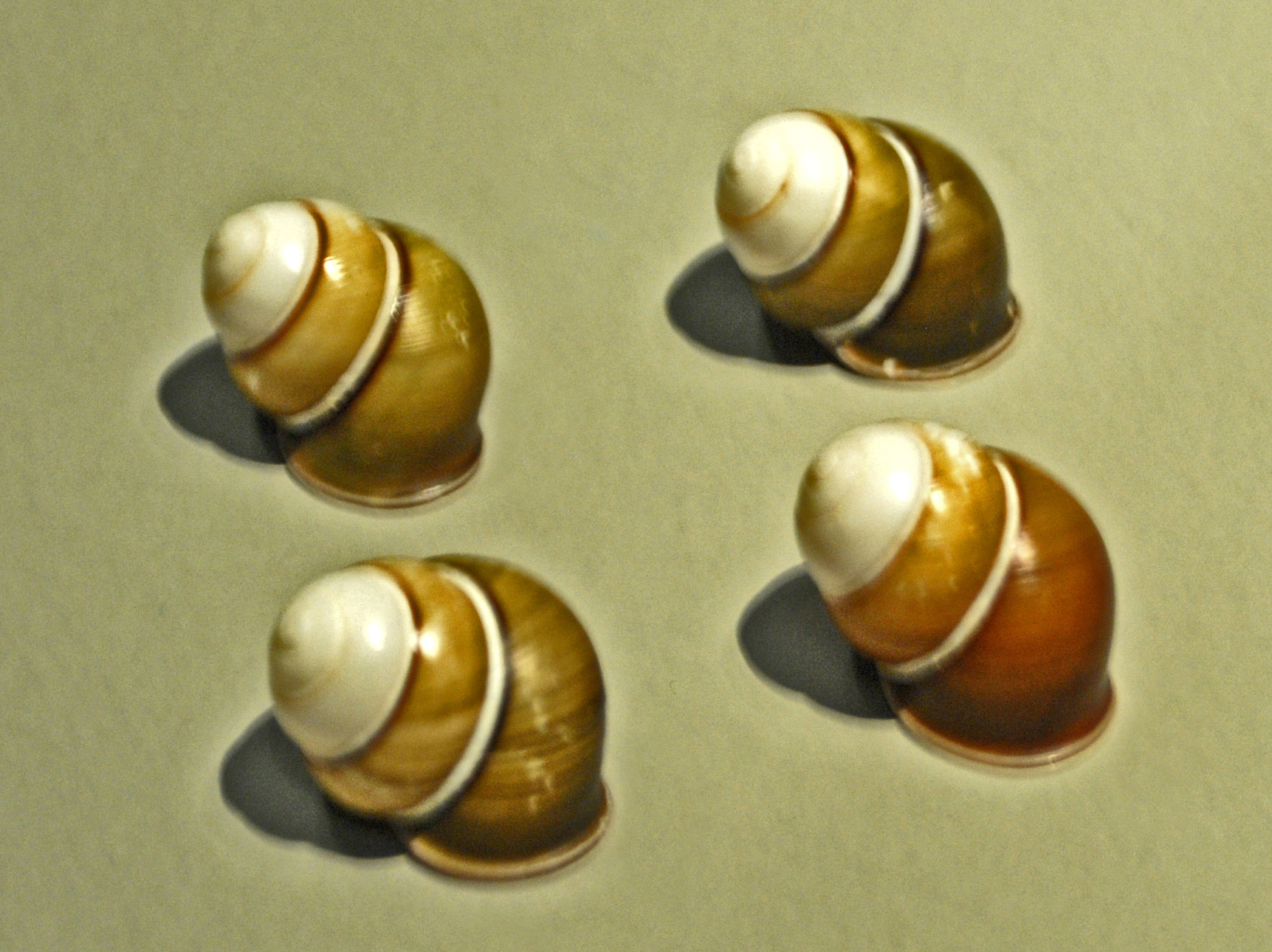
- Shells of Dryocochlias metaformis on display at the Museo Civico di Storia Naturale di Milano

Scientific classification
- Kingdom: Animalia
- Phylum: Mollusca
- Class: Gastropoda
- Order: Stylommatophora
- Family: Camaenidae
- Genus: Dryocochlias
- Species: D. metaformis

Binomial name
- Dryocochlias metaformis (Ferussac, 1821)

Synonyms
- Cochlostyla (Dryocochlias) metaformis (Férussac, 1821) (superseded combination); Cochlostyla (Dryocochlias) metaformis ovularis (Menke, 1828) (junior synonym); Cochlostyla hydrophana (G. B. Sowerby I, 1841) (superseded combination); Cochlostyla metaformis (Férussac, 1821) (superseded combination); Cochlostyla ovularis (Menke, 1828) (junior synonym); Helicostyla (Coracia) metaformis (Férussac, 1821) (misspelling of original name, Corasia, Albers, 1850); Helicostyla metaformis (Férussac, 1821) (superseded combination); Helix (Cochlogena) hydrophana G. B. Sowerby I, 1841 (original combination); Helix hydrophana G. B. Sowerby I, 1841· accepted, alternate representation; Helix metaformis Férussac, 1821 (original combination); Helix ovularis Menke, 1828 (junior synonym)

= Dryocochlias metaformis =

Species of gastropod

Dryocochlias metaformis is a species of medium-sized, air-breathing land snail, a terrestrial pulmonate gastropod mollusc in the family Camaenidae.

This species can be found in the Philippines. Shells can reach a length of about 55 millimetres (2.2 in).
