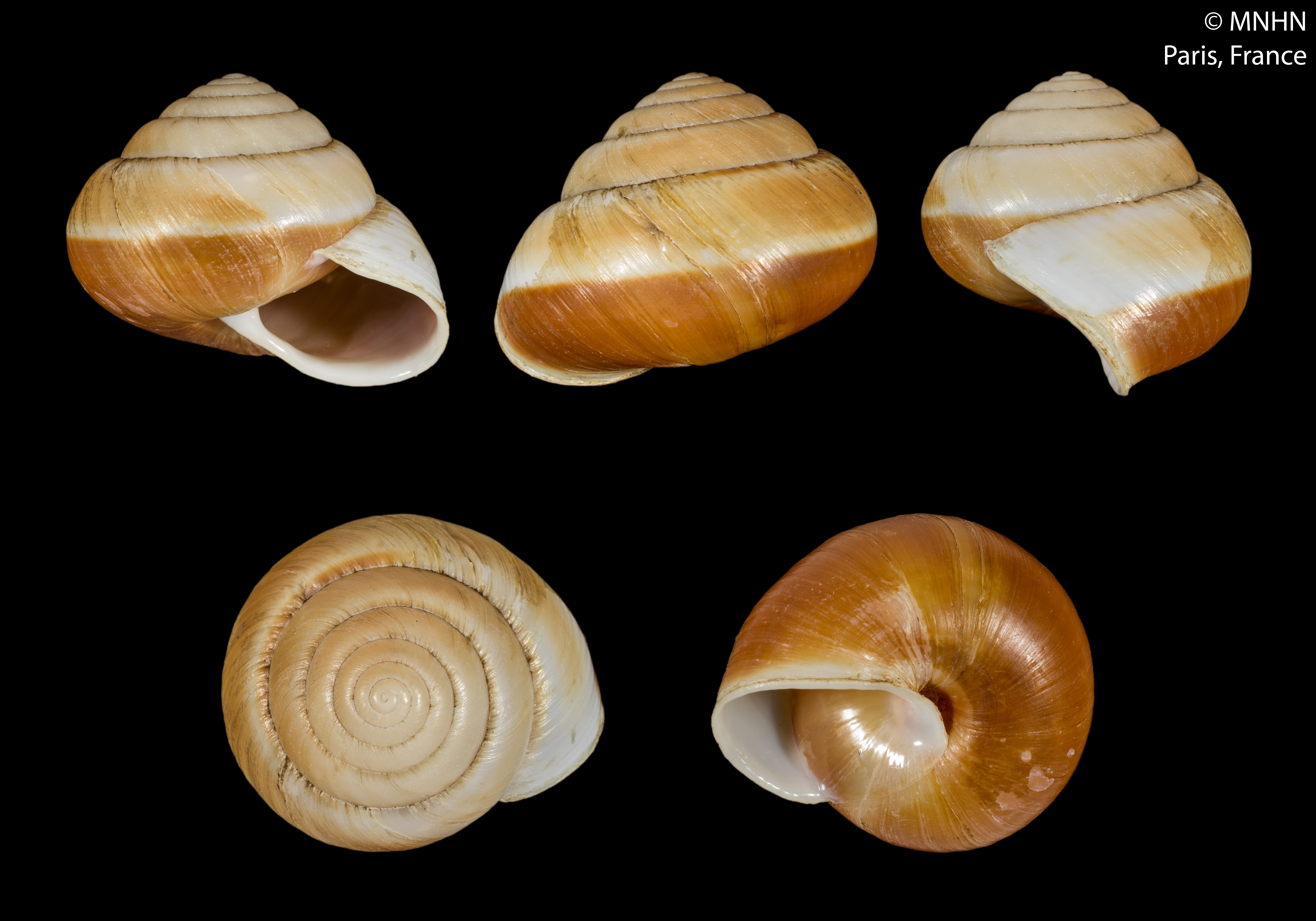
- Shell of Hadra bipartita (syntype at MNHN, Paris)

Scientific classification
- Kingdom: Animalia
- Phylum: Mollusca
- Class: Gastropoda
- Order: Stylommatophora
- Superfamily: Helicoidea
- Family: Camaenidae
- Subfamily: Hadrinae
- Genus: Hadra; Albers, 1860

Type species
- Helix bipartita Férussac, 1823

Synonyms
- Helix (Hadra) Martens, 1860; Micardista Iredale, 1933 (junior synonym)

= Hadra (gastropod) =

Genus of gastropods

Hadra is a genus of air-breathing land snails in the family Camaenidae.

== Species ==
Species within the genus Hadra include:

- Hadra barneyi (Cox, 1873)
- Hadra bartschi (W. B. Marshall, 1927)
- Hadra bellendenkerensis
- Hadra beddomae
- Hadra bipartita (Férussac, 1823)
- Hadra brunodavidi Stanisic, 2010
- Hadra funiculata (Reeve, 1854)
- Hadra semicastanea (Pfeiffer, 1849)
- Hadra webbi (Pilsbry, 1900)

Species brought into synonymy

- Hadra adcockiana Bednall, 1894 : synonym of Granulomelon adcockianum (Bednall, 1894) (original combination)
- Hadra arcigerens Tate, 1894 : synonym of Granulomelon adcockianum (Bednall, 1894)
- Hadra blighi Iredale, 1937 : synonym of Hadra semicastanea (Pfeiffer, 1849) (junior synonym)
- Hadra blomfieldi (Cox, 1864) : synonym of Sphaerospira blomfieldi (Cox, 1864) (superseded combination)
- Hadra clydonigera Tate, 1894 : synonym of Granulomelon adcockianum (Bednall, 1894) (junior synonym)
- Hadra corneovirens (Pfeiffer, 1851) : synonym of Sauroconcha corneovirens (L. Pfeiffer, 1851) (superseded combination)
- Hadra euzyga Tate, 1894 : synonym of Catellotrachia euzyga (Tate, 1894) (original combination)
- Hadra grandituberculata Tate, 1894 : synonym of Granulomelon grandituberculatum (Tate, 1894) (original combination)
- Hadra granulifera Möllendorff, 1888 : synonym of Euhadra granulifera (Möllendorff, 1888) (original combination)
- Hadra leonhardti Möllendorff, 1888 : synonym of Camaena leonhardti (Möllendorff, 1888) (original combination)
- Hadra mortenseni Iredale, 1929 : synonym of Sphaerospira mortenseni (Iredale, 1929)
- Hadra nux Möllendorff, 1888 : synonym of Satsuma nux (Möllendorff, 1888) (original combination)
- Hadra oligopleura Tate, 1894 : synonym of Basedowena oligopleura (Tate, 1894) (original combination)
- Hadra papillosa Tate, 1894 : synonym of Catellotrachia setigera (Tate, 1894) (junior synonym)
- Hadra philippinensis C. Semper, 1873 : synonym of Camaena philippinensis (C. Semper, 1873) (superseded combination)
- Hadra rockhamptonensis (Cox, 1873) : synonym of Sphaerospira rockhamptonensis (Cox, 1873) (superseded combination)
- Hadra schmackeri Möllendorff, 1888 : synonym of Euhadra schmackeri (Möllendorff, 1888) (original combination)
- Hadra setigera Tate, 1894 : synonym of Catellotrachia setigera (Tate, 1894) (original combination)
- Hadra squamulosa Tate, 1894 : synonym of Granulomelon squamulosum (Tate, 1894) (original combination)
- Hadra subgibbera Möllendorff, 1885 : synonym of Camaena subgibbera (Möllendorff, 1885) (original combination)
- Hadra sublevata Tate, 1894 : synonym of Dirutrachia sublevata (Tate, 1894) (original combination)
- Hadra wattii Tate, 1894 : synonym of Vidumelon wattii (Tate, 1894) (original combination)
- Hadra wilpenensis Tate, 1894 : synonym of Sinumelon wilpenense (Tate, 1894) (original combination)
- Hadra wilsoniSolem, 1979 : synonym of Youwanjela wilsoni (Solem, 1979) (original combination)
- Hadra winneckeana Tate, 1894 : synonym of Catellotrachia winneckeana (Tate, 1894) (original combination)
