= Sphaerospora (disambiguation) =

Sphaerospora may refer to:

- Sphaerospora (cnidarian), a genus of cnidarians in the family Sphaerosporidae
- Sphaerospora, a genus of fungi in the family Pyronemataceae, synonym of Scutellinia
- Sphaerospora Klatt, 1864, a genus of plants in the family Iridaceae, synonym of Geissorhiza
- Sphaerospora Sweet, a genus of plants in the family Iridaceae, synonym of Gladiolus

== See also ==
- Sphaerospira, a gastropod genus
