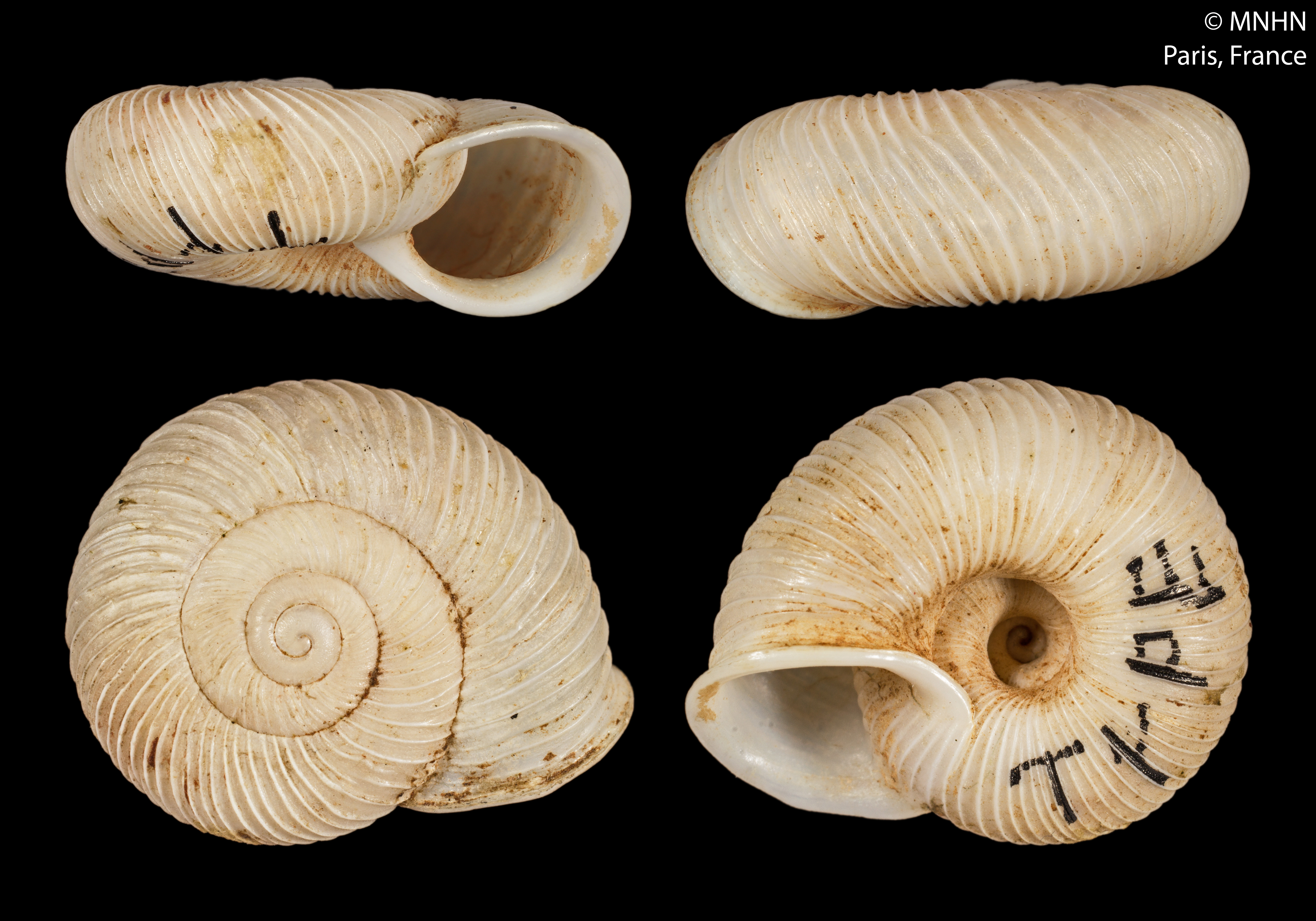
- Shell of Pleuroxia cyrtopleura (lectotype at MNHN, Paris)

Scientific classification
- Kingdom: Animalia
- Phylum: Mollusca
- Class: Gastropoda
- Order: Stylommatophora
- Infraorder: Helicoidei
- Superfamily: Helicoidea
- Family: Camaenidae
- Genus: Pleuroxia; Ancey 1887

Type species
- Helix cyrtopleura L. Pfeiffer, 1862

Synonyms
- Angasella A. Adams in Angas, 1864 (not used after 1899 as erroneously considered a homonym of Angasiella Crosse, 1864); Angasietta Iredale, 1939; Gantomia Iredale, 1939

= Pleuroxia =

Genus of gastropods

Pleuroxia is a genus of air-breathing land snails, terrestrial gastropod molluscs in the subfamily Hadrinae of the family Camaenidae.

== Species ==
Species within the genus Pleuroxia include:

- Pleuroxia abstans Iredale, 1939
- Pleuroxia carmeena G.A. Solem, 1993
- Pleuroxia clydonigera R. Tate, 1894
- Pleuroxia cyrtopleura (Pfeiffer, 1862)
- Pleuroxia everardensis (Bednall, 1892)
- Pleuroxia italowiana Solem, 1992
- Pleuroxia lemani G.P.L.K. Gude, 1916
- Pleuroxia overlanderensis G.A. Solem, 1997
- Pleuroxia phillipsiana (Angas, 1873)

Synonyms

- Pleuroxia adcockiana (Bednall, 1894): synonym of Granulomelon adcockianum (Bednall, 1894)
- Pleuroxia arcigerens Tate, 1894: synonym of Granulomelon adcockianum (Bednall, 1894)
- Pleuroxia bethana Solem, 1997: synonym of Basedowena bethana (Solem, 1997) (original combination)
- Pleuroxia commenta Iredale, 1939: synonym of Basedowena polypleura (Tate, 1899) (junior synonym)
- Pleuroxia cooperi Cotton, 1939: synonym of Pleuroxia phillipsiana (Angas, 1873) (junior synonym)
- Pleuroxia elfina Iredale, 1939: synonym of Basedowena elfina (Iredale, 1939)
- Pleuroxia hinsbyi Gude, 1916: synonym of Basedowena hinsbyi (Gude, 1916) (superseded combination)
- Pleuroxia mawsoni Iredale, 1937: synonym of Cooperconcha mawsoni (Iredale, 1937) (original combination)
- Pleuroxia musga Iredale, 1937: synonym of Tatemelon musgum (Iredale, 1937) (original combination)
- Pleuroxia oligopleura (Tate, 1894): synonym of Basedowena oligopleura (Tate, 1894)
- Pleuroxia polypleura (Tate, 1899): synonym of Basedowena polypleura (Tate, 1899)
- Pleuroxia radiata (Hedley, 1905): synonym of Basedowena radiata (Hedley, 1905)
- Pleuroxia ruga otton, 1953: synonym of Strepsitaurus rugus (Cotton, 1953) (original combination)
