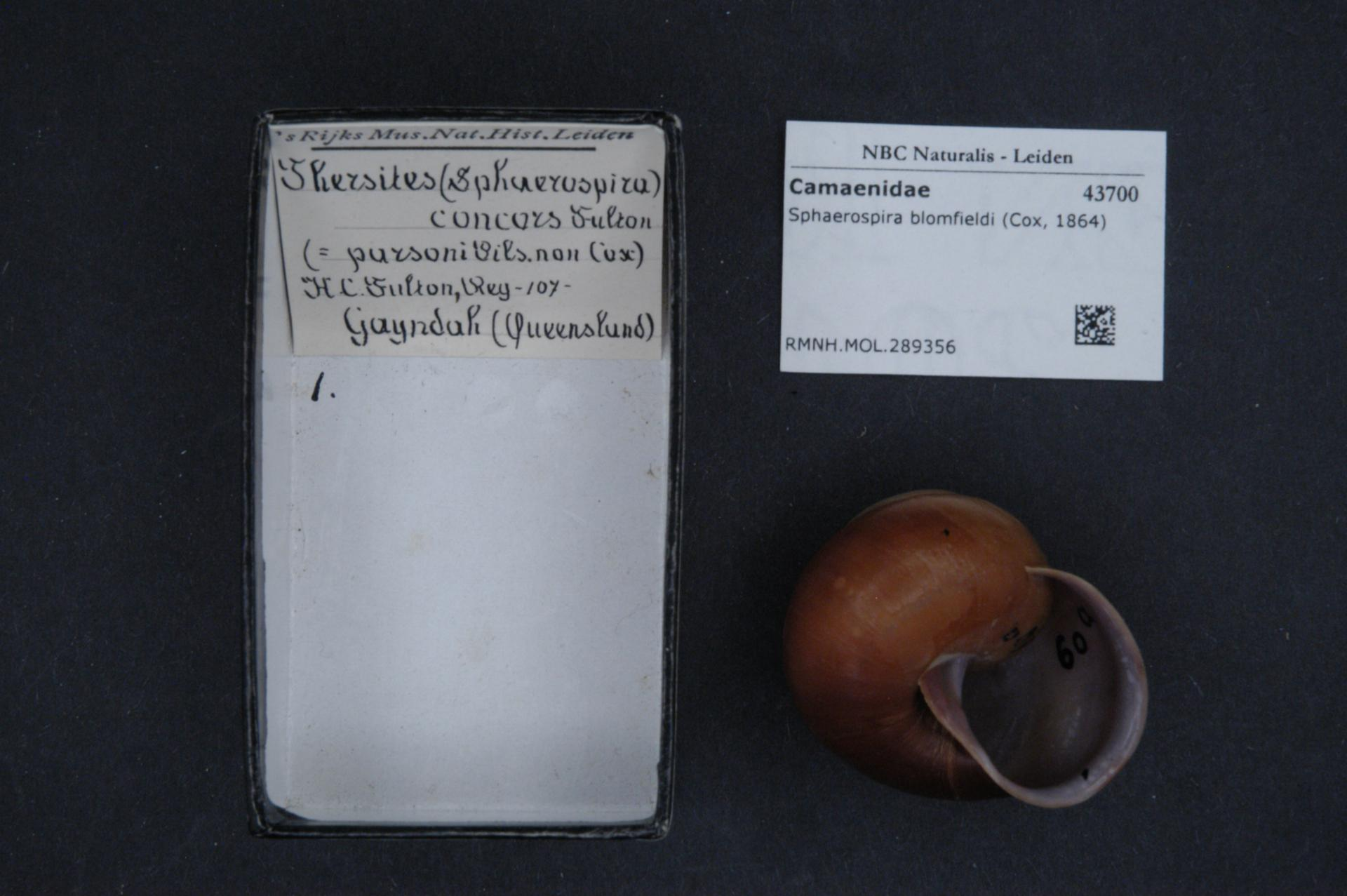
- Shell of Sphaeospira blomfieldi (specimen at Naturalis Biodiversity Center)

Scientific classification
- Kingdom: Animalia
- Phylum: Mollusca
- Class: Gastropoda
- Order: Stylommatophora
- Superfamily: Helicoidea
- Family: Camaenidae
- Subfamily: Hadrinae
- Genus: Sphaerospira; Mörch, 1867

Type species
- Helix fraseri Gray in Griffith & Pidgeon, 1833

Synonyms
- Chloritis (Sphaerospira) Mörch, 1867; Varohadra Iredale, 1933 (name not available. published without description)

= Sphaerospira =

Genus of gastropods

Sphaerospira is a genus of air-breathing land snails, terrestrial pulmonate gastropod molluscs in the family Camaenidae.

Some authorities consider this to be merely a subgenus of the genus Thersites.

== Species ==
Species within the genus Sphaerospira include:

- Sphaerospira arthuriana (Cox, 1873)
- Sphaerospira bencarlessi Stanisic & Potter, 2010
- Sphaerospira blomfieldi (Cox, 1864)
- Sphaerospira fraseri (Gray in Griffith & Pidgeon, 1833)
- Sphaerospira informis (Mousson, 1869)
- Sphaerospira mortenseni (Iredale, 1929)
- Sphaerospira mossmani (Brazier, 1875)
- Sphaerospira oconnellensis (Cox, 1871)
- Sphaerospira rockhamptonensis (Cox, 1873)
- Sphaerospira sidneyi (Iredale, 1933)

Species brought into synonymy

- Sphaerospira macleayi (Cox, 1865): synonym of Bentosites macleayi (Cox, 1865)
- Sphaerospira parallela Iredale, 1937: synonym of Sphaerospira fraseri (Gray in Griffith & Pidgeon, 1833) (junior synonym)
- Sphaerospira rawnesleyi (Cox, 1873): synonym of Steorra rawnesleyi (Cox, 1873) (superseded combination)
- Sphaerospira whartoni (Cox, 1871): synonym of Temporena whartoni (Cox, 1871)
