= Basedowena =

Scientific classification
- Kingdom: Animalia
- Phylum: Mollusca
- Class: Gastropoda
- Order: Stylommatophora
- Infraorder: Helicoidei
- Superfamily: Helicoidea
- Family: Camaenidae
- Genus: Basedowena; Iredale, 1937

Type species
- Basedowena cottoni Iredale, 1937

Synonyms
- Fatulabia Iredale, 1937; Minimelon Solem, 1993

Genus of gastropods

Basedowena is a genus of air-breathing land snails in the subfamily Hadrinae of the family Camaenidae.

== Species ==
- Basedowena angatjana (Solem, 1993)
- Basedowena bethana (Solem, 1997)
- Basedowena bicolor Criscione & Köhler, 2016
- Basedowena cognata Solem, 1993
- Basedowena colmani (Solem, 1993)
- Basedowena cottoni Iredale, 1937
- Basedowena elderi (Bednall, 1892)
- Basedowena elfina (Iredale, 1939)
- Basedowena gigantea Solem, 1993
- Basedowena hinsbyi (Gude, 1916)
- Basedowena holoserica Criscione & Köhler, 2016
- Basedowena katjawarana Solem, 1993
- Basedowena olgana Solem, 1993
- Basedowena oligopleura (Tate, 1894)
- Basedowena papulankutjana Solem, 1993
- Basedowena polypleura (Tate, 1899)
- Basedowena radiata (Hedley, 1905)
- Basedowena siparium Criscione & Köhler, 2016
- Basedowena vulgata Solem, 1993

Synonyms

- Basedowena squamulosa (Tate, 1894): synonym of Granulomelon squamulosum (Tate, 1894)
