= Pleuroxia italowiana =

Conservation status
- Near Threatened (IUCN 2.3)

Scientific classification
- Kingdom: Animalia
- Phylum: Mollusca
- Class: Gastropoda
- Order: Stylommatophora
- Family: Camaenidae
- Genus: Pleuroxia
- Species: P. italowiana

Binomial name
- Pleuroxia italowiana Solem, 1992

Species of gastropod

Pleuroxia italowiana is a species of air-breathing land snail, a terrestrial pulmonate gastropod mollusc in the family Camaenidae. This species is endemic to Australia.
