= Granulomelon =

Scientific classification
- Kingdom: Animalia
- Phylum: Mollusca
- Class: Gastropoda
- Order: Stylommatophora
- Infraorder: Helicoidei
- Superfamily: Helicoidea
- Family: Camaenidae
- Genus: Granulomelon; Iredale, 1933

Type species
- Hadra grandituberculata Tate, 1894

Synonyms
- Baccalena Iredale, 1937

Genus of gastropods

Granulomelon is a genus of air-breathing land snails, terrestrial pulmonate gastropod mollusks in the family Camaenidae.

== Species ==
Species within the genus Granulomelon include:

- Granulomelon adcockianum (Bednall, 1894)
- Granulomelon grandituberculatum (Tate, 1894)
- Granulomelon squamulosum (Tate, 1894)

Synonyms

- Granulomelon acerbum Solem, 1993: synonym of Granulomelon grandituberculatum (Tate, 1894)
- Granulomelon arcigerens (Tate, 1894): synonym of Granulomelon adcockianum (Bednall, 1894) (junior synonym)
- Granulomelon gilleni Solem, 1993: synonym of Granulomelon grandituberculatum (Tate, 1894)
