= Catellotrachia =

Scientific classification
- Kingdom: Animalia
- Phylum: Mollusca
- Class: Gastropoda
- Order: Stylommatophora
- Family: Camaenidae
- Subfamily: Hadrinae
- Genus: Catellotrachia; Iredale, 1933

Synonyms
- Semotrachia Iredale, 1937; Spernachloritis Iredale, 1933

Genus of gastropods

Catellotrachia is a genus of air-breathing land snails, terrestrial pulmonate gastropod mollusks in the family Camaenidae.

== Species ==
The following species are recognised in the genus Catellotrachia:

- Catellotrachia bagoti (Solem, 1993)
- Catellotrachia basedowi (Hedley, 1905)
- Catellotrachia bensteadana (Solem, 1993)
- Catellotrachia caupona (Solem, 1993)
- Catellotrachia discoidea (Solem, 1993)
- Catellotrachia elleryi (Solem, 1993)
- Catellotrachia emilia (Solem, 1993)
- Catellotrachia esau (Iredale, 1937)
- Catellotrachia euzyga (Tate, 1894)
- Catellotrachia filixiana (Solem, 1993)
- Catellotrachia hortulana (Solem, 1993)
- Catellotrachia huckittana (Solem, 1993)
- Catellotrachia hughana (Solem, 1993)
- Catellotrachia illarana (Solem, 1993)
- Catellotrachia illbilleeana (Solem, 1993)
- Catellotrachia jessieana (Solem, 1993)
- Catellotrachia jinkana (Solem, 1993)
- Catellotrachia mannensis Iredale, 1937
- Catellotrachia minuta Solem, 1993
- Catellotrachia plana (Solem, 1993)
- Catellotrachia rossana (Solem, 1993)
- Catellotrachia runutjirbana (Solem, 1993)
- Catellotrachia setigera (Tate, 1894)
- Catellotrachia strangwayana (Solem, 1993)
- Catellotrachia winneckeana (Tate, 1894)
