= Bentosites =

Scientific classification
- Kingdom: Animalia
- Phylum: Mollusca
- Class: Gastropoda
- Order: Stylommatophora
- Superfamily: Helicoidea
- Family: Camaenidae
- Subfamily: Hadrinae
- Genus: Bentosites; Iredale, 1933

Type species
- Helix macleayi Cox, 1865

Genus of gastropods

Bentosites is a genus of air-breathing land snails, terrestrial pulmonate gastropod mollusks in the subfamily Hadrinae of the family Camaenidae.

== Species ==
- Bentosites coxi (Crosse, 1866)
- Bentosites etheridgei (Brazier, 1877)
- Bentosites fortasse (Iredale, 1933)
- Bentosites gavisa Iredale, 1933
- Bentosites hefferani Stanisic, 2010
- Bentosites macleayi (Cox, 1865)

Species brought into synonymy

- Bentosites birchi Iredale, 1933: synonym of Bentosites gavisa Iredale, 1933 (junior synonym)
- Bentosites blomfieldi (Cox, 1864): synonym of Sphaerospira blomfieldi (Cox, 1864) (superseded combination)
