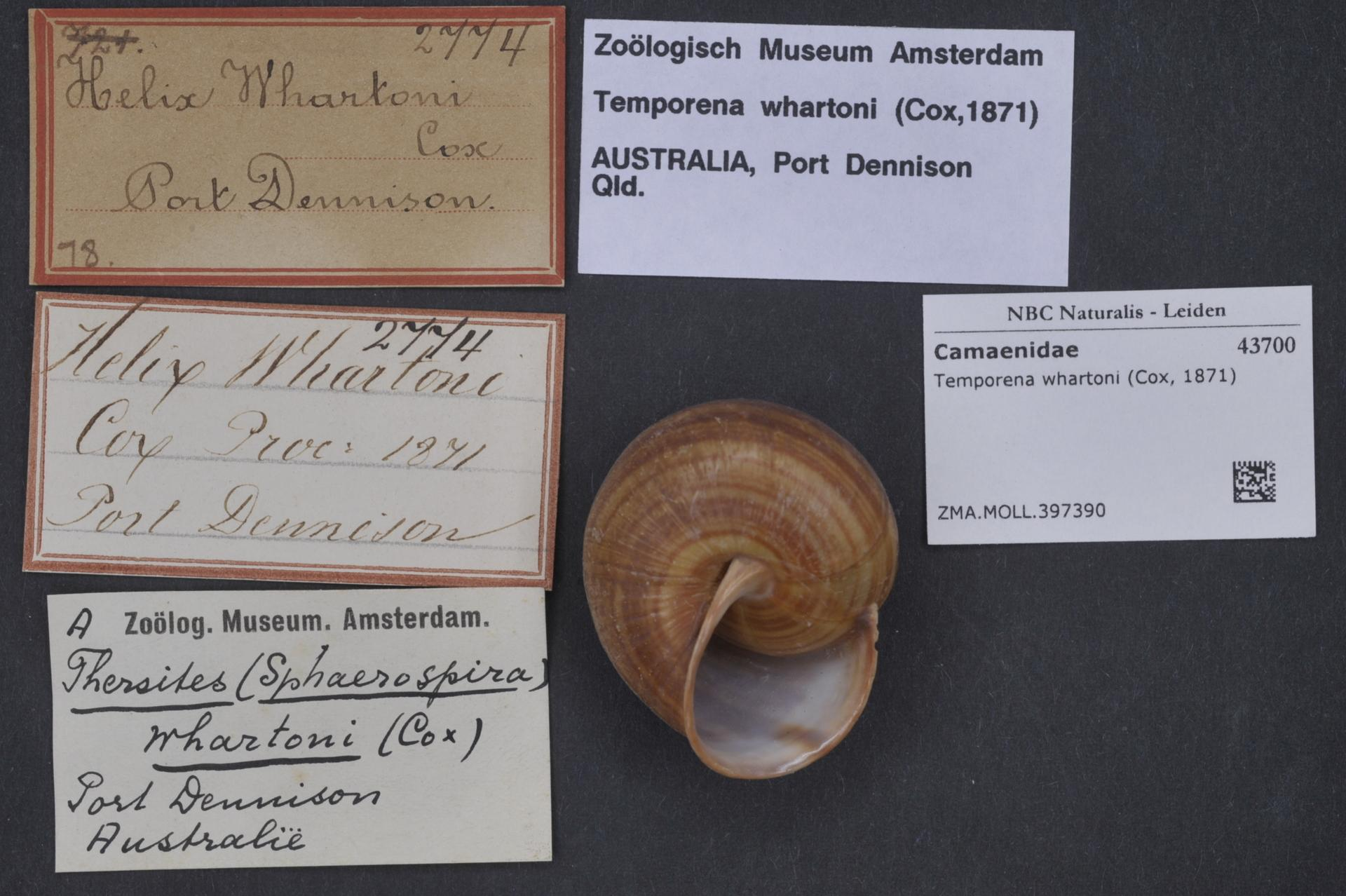
- Temporena whartoni

Scientific classification
- Kingdom: Animalia
- Phylum: Mollusca
- Class: Gastropoda
- Order: Stylommatophora
- Superfamily: Helicoidea
- Family: Camaenidae
- Subfamily: Hadrinae
- Genus: Temporena; Iredale, 1933

= Temporena =

Genus of gastropods

Temporena is a genus of air-breathing land snails, terrestrial pulmonate gastropod molluscs in the subfamily Hadrinae of the family Camaenidae.

== Species ==
- Temporena juliafoxae Stanisic, 2010
- Temporena sardalabiata (Cox, 1871)
- Temporena whartoni (Cox, 1871)
