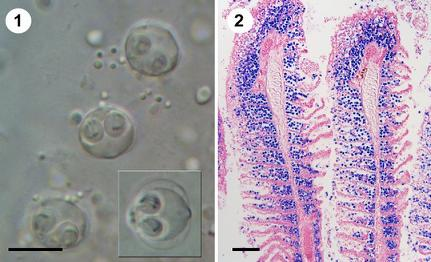
- Figure 1: Fresh spores of S. molnari in a gill smear of common carp (1; size bar 10 μm) and histological section of heavily infected gill filaments with spore-forming stages labelled in blue (2; size bar 100 μm); from Eszterbauer et al., 2013

Scientific classification
- Kingdom: Animalia
- Phylum: Cnidaria
- Class: Myxosporea
- Order: Bivalvulida
- Family: Sphaerosporidae
- Genus: Sphaerospora
- Species: S. molnari

Binomial name
- Sphaerospora molnari Lom, Dyková, Pavlásková and Grupcheva, 1983

= Sphaerospora molnari =

Species of marine parasite

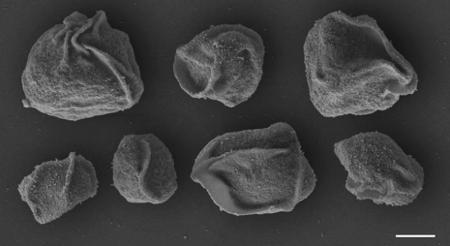
Scanning electron microscopy image of proliferative S. molnari stages. The surface folds promote the motility of these stages in carp blood; size bar=1 μm; from Hartigan et al., 2016

Sphaerospora molnari is a microscopic endoparasite of carp (Cyprinus carpio) in pond cultures and natural freshwater habitats in Central and Eastern Europe. In natural infections, S. molnari invades the epithelia of gills and surrounding skin regions. It then forms spores in between epithelial cells, causing sphaerosporosis, a pathological condition of the skin and gill tissues. Affected tissues show marked dystrophic changes and necrosis, causing secondary bacterial infections and resulting in osmoregulatory and respiratory failure. Mortalities can reach 100% but little is known about the overall distribution of the parasite species in European carp ponds or its economic impact on carp aquaculture.

== Taxonomy ==
Before 1983, S. molnari was identified as S. carassii. Thereafter, it was distinguished from S. carassii (Kudo, 1919) and S. chinensis based on spore morphology, host species and geographic locality. Based on 18S rDNA sequences, S. molnari belongs to a well-defined taxonomic clade of myxozoans, Sphaerospora sensu stricto. This clade of myxosporeans is composed mostly of endoparasites infecting the urinary system of marine and freshwater fish, and it is characterized by extremely large inserts in the 18S rDNA gene sequence, with S. molnari possessing the longest known myxozoan 18S rDNA sequence (3714 bp) and one of the longest amongst eukaryotes.

== Life cycle ==
The life cycle for S. molnari has not yet been identified, but its closest relative, S. dykovae was experimentally shown to cycle between an oligochaete worm as invertebrate host and common carp as vertebrate host. The molecular identity of the two life cycle stages of S. dykovae is unconfirmed.

== Pathology and clinical signs ==
S. molnari pathology involves inflammatory changes in the affected epithelia, accompanied by marked dystrophic changes and finally necrosis. Necrotic disintegration of infected tissue results in the release of spores into the environment and transmission to the next host. Clinical signs are respiratory distress and pale gills. The early, presporogonic development of S. molnari includes parasite multiplication in the blood, likely a common cycle of development of the members of Sphaerospora sensu stricto. Most recently, it has been demonstrated that this early development causes a massive inflammatory response with strongly increased lymphocyte numbers and likely a specific B cell response, and that partial immunity is acquired. This may help to explain why the disease is associated with fry and fingerlings but not older carp.

== Impact ==
The impact of gill and skin sphaerosporosis of common carp on carp aquaculture cannot presently be estimated but an increased occurrence of S. molnari proliferative blood stages in carp ponds in the Czech Republic and Hungary was reported in 2014. A link to increasing pond temperatures due to climate change was proposed.

== Diagnosis ==
Proliferative blood stages are highly motile and can easily be differentiated from other blood parasites of common carp due to a unique motility mode. Spores in the gills meet the characteristic diagnostic features of the genus Sphaerospora and are spherical spores with a spore length=spore width of approx. 10 μm and subspherical polar capsules measuring 4.7 (length) x 3.9 (width) μm. 18S rDNA sequences are available on GenBank under the accession numbers JX431511, JX431510, AF378345. Accession number AF378345 is likely an erroneous sequence. The full ribosomal RNA sequence is available under accession number MK533682, a transcriptomic dataset from motile blood stages is published as Bioproject PRJNA522909 (SRX5386637). Specific PCR and qPCR assays exist and are able to differentiate the species from congeners occurring in the same host and quantify parasite numbers.

== Treatments ==
There are presently no treatments against myxozoans in fish destined for human consumption. Ganeva et al. demonstrated the effectiveness of certain in-feed treatments against S. molnari, with reduced parasite numbers in the blood of carp receiving diets enriched with certain parasiticidal and immunostimulatory substances.

== Other control strategies ==
No other control strategies have been identified.

== Research ==
Important limitations regarding in vivo models are a major reason for the limited information on host-parasite interactions in myxozoans and their hosts. Of more than 2600 known myxozoan species, only 55 life cycles have been elucidated to date, and very few (3-4) are continuously perpetuated in research laboratories, as their maintenance is laborious and time-consuming, with the production of fish-infective spore stages in oligochaete or polychaete cultures spanning over several weeks or months. One of the aims of the EU-funded Horizon 2020 Project ParaFishControl, was to establish the first in vivo and in vitro culture system for myxozoan proliferative stages (based on S. molnari blood stages), excluding full life cycle production. Such a system allows for the production of large numbers of host-free parasite stages for genomic/transcriptomic analyses, analyses on host-parasite interactions, and the establishment of test systems for antiparasitic/immunostimulatory substances, molecular interference approaches or vaccine trial. An experimental research model for proliferative stages is urgently required for myxozoans, for which no treatments are available but which appear to be an important group of fish parasites on the rise. First transcriptomic datasets of blood stages have been studied with regard to its arsenal of proteolytic enzymes, which have demonstrated a great potential for vaccine design in other parasites.
