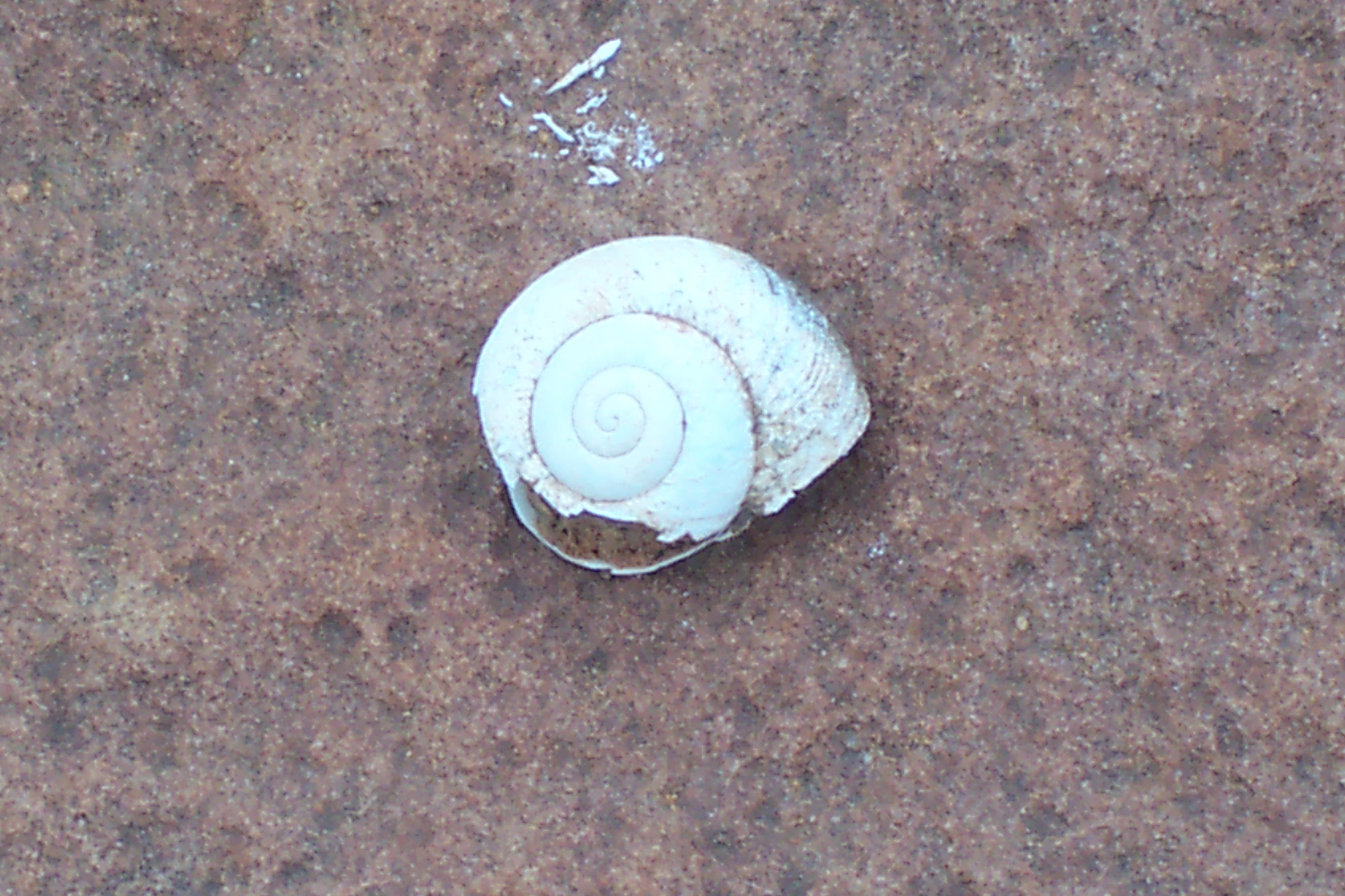
- Basedowena hinsbyi shell, Mutawintji National Park, Australia

Conservation status
- Vulnerable (IUCN 2.3)

Scientific classification
- Kingdom: Animalia
- Phylum: Mollusca
- Class: Gastropoda
- Order: Stylommatophora
- Family: Camaenidae
- Genus: Basedowena
- Species: B. hinsbyi

Binomial name
- Basedowena hinsbyi (Gude, 1916)

Synonyms
- Angasella hinsbyi Gude, 1916 (original combination); Pleuroxia hinsbyi (Gude, 1916) (superseded combination)

= Basedowena hinsbyi =

Species of gastropod

Basedowena hinsbyi is a species of air-breathing land snail, a terrestrial pulmonate gastropod mollusc in the family Camaenidae.

This species is endemic to New South Wales, Australia.

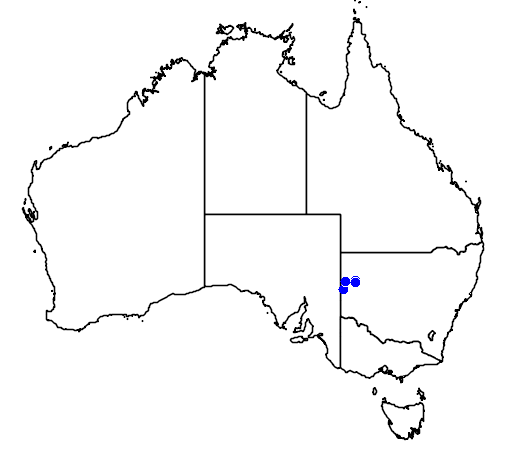
Distribution map of Basedowena hinsbyi
