= Sphaerospira rockhamptonensis =

Conservation status
- Near Threatened (IUCN 2.3)

Scientific classification
- Kingdom: Animalia
- Phylum: Mollusca
- Class: Gastropoda
- Order: Stylommatophora
- Family: Camaenidae
- Genus: Sphaerospira
- Species: S. rockhamptonensis

Binomial name
- Sphaerospira rockhamptonensis (Cox, 1873)

Synonyms
- Helix moresbyi Angas, 1876; Helix planibasis Brazier, 1881; Helix rockhamptonensis Cox, 1873; Varohadra rockhamptonensis decreta Iredale, 1937

Species of gastropod

Preserved sphaerospira rockhamptonensis specimen (Cox, 1873)

Sphaerospira rockhamptonensis, common name the Rockhampton banded snail, is a species of air-breathing land snails, terrestrial pulmonate gastropod molluscs in the family Camaenidae.

This species is endemic to Australia.
