= Bentosites macleayi =

Conservation status
- Near Threatened (IUCN 2.3)

Scientific classification
- Kingdom: Animalia
- Phylum: Mollusca
- Class: Gastropoda
- Order: Stylommatophora
- Family: Camaenidae
- Genus: Bentosites
- Species: B. macleayi

Binomial name
- Bentosites macleayi (Cox, 1865)

Synonyms
- Bentosites macleayi wardiana Iredale, 1933 (junior synonym); Helix macleayi Cox, 1865 (original combination); Sphaerospira macleayi (Cox, 1865)

Species of gastropod

Bentosites macleayi is a species of air-breathing land snails, terrestrial pulmonate gastropod mollusc in the family Camaenidae.

This species is endemic to Australia.
