= Sphaerospora =

Scientific classification
- Kingdom: Animalia
- Phylum: Cnidaria
- Class: Myxosporea
- Order: Bivalvulida
- Family: Sphaerosporidae
- Genus: Sphaerospora; Thélohan, 1892

Genus of marine parasites

Sphaerospora is a genus of parasitic cnidarians belonging to the family Sphaerosporidae.

The species of this genus are found in Europe and Northern America.

== Species ==
There are 111 species assigned to Sphaerospora:

- Sphaerospora abrami Patra, Bartošová-Sojková, Pecková, Fiala, Eszterbauer & Holzer, 2018
- Sphaerospora alata Lisnerová, 2022
- Sphaerospora aldrichettae Su & White, 1994
- Sphaerospora amurensis Akhmerov, 1960
- Sphaerospora angulata Fujita, 1912
- Sphaerospora araii Arthur & Lom, 1985
- Sphaerospora argentinensis Cantatore & Lisnerová, 2022
- Sphaerospora armatura (Yoshino & Moser, 1974)
- Sphaerospora bliccae Patra, Bartošová-Sojková, Pecková, Fiala, Eszterbauer & Holzer, 2018
- Sphaerospora bramae El-Matbouli, Hoffmann & Kern, 1995
- Sphaerospora branchialis Razmashkin & Skripchemko, 1967
- Sphaerospora brevis (Polyanskii, 1955)
- Sphaerospora brevoides (Zhao & Song, 2009)
- Sphaerospora carassii Kudo, 1920
- Sphaerospora caspialosae (Dogiel, 1939)
- Sphaerospora chagasi (Nemeczek, 1926)
- Sphaerospora colomani Baska, 1990
- Sphaerospora compressa (Noble, 1939)
- Sphaerospora coregoni El-Matbouli, Hoffmann & Kern, 1995
- Sphaerospora corsulae Sarkar & Ghosh, 1991
- Sphaerospora cristata Shulman, 1962
- Sphaerospora ctenopharyngodoni Chen, 1998
- Sphaerospora danubialus Molnár, 1991
- Sphaerospora dentata Patra, Bartošová-Sojková, Pecková, Fiala, Eszterbauer & Holzer, 2018
- Sphaerospora diminuta Li & Desser, 1985
- Sphaerospora dissostichi Brickle, Kalavati & MacKenzie, 2001
- Sphaerospora diversa Patra, Bartošová-Sojková, Pecková, Fiala, Eszterbauer & Holzer, 2018
- Sphaerospora dogieli Shulman, 1962
- Sphaerospora dykovae Gunter & Adlard, 2010
- Sphaerospora elegans Thélohan, 1892
- Sphaerospora elopi Patra, Bartošová-Sojková, Pecková, Fiala, Eszterbauer & Holzer, 2018
- Sphaerospora elwhaiensis Jones, Fiala, Prosperi-Porta, House & Mumford, 2011
- Sphaerospora epinepheli Supamattaya, Fischer-Scherl, Hoffmann & Boonyaratpalin, 1991
- Sphaerospora erythroculteri (Hsieh & Gong, 1993)
- Sphaerospora festivus Bittencourt, Ferreira, da Silva Videira, da Silva, da Silva, Hamoy, Carvalho & Matos, 2021
- Sphaerospora formosa (Kovaleva & Gaevskaya, 1979)
- Sphaerospora fugu (Tun, Yokoyama, Ogawa & Wakayabashi, 2000)
- Sphaerospora gasterostei Schuurmans Stekhoven, 1920
- Sphaerospora glomerosa (Davis, 1917)
- Sphaerospora gobionis Lom, Pavlásková & Dyková, 1985
- Sphaerospora gutta Patra, Bartošová-Sojková, Pecková, Fiala, Eszterbauer & Holzer, 2018
- Sphaerospora hangzhouensis Li & Wu, 1983
- Sphaerospora hankai Lom, Desser & Dyková, 1989
- Sphaerospora hunanensis Chen, 1998
- Sphaerospora hupehensis Li & Nie, 1973
- Sphaerospora hypophthalmichthysis (Chen & Hsieh, 1984)
- Sphaerospora ictaluri Hedrick, Mcdowell & Groff, 1990
- Sphaerospora inaequalis Landsberg, 1987
- Sphaerospora johnae Sarkar, 2010
- Sphaerospora koreana (Cho & Kim, 2001)
- Sphaerospora krogiusi (Konovalov & Schulman, 1965)
- Sphaerospora kwantungensis Chen, 1998
- Sphaerospora lieni Feng & Wang, 1990
- Sphaerospora lobosa (Davis, 1917)
- Sphaerospora luciopercae Moshu, 1992
- Sphaerospora lutjani (Kpatcha, Diebakate & Toguebaye, 1996)
- Sphaerospora mackenzii (Kalavati & Narayana Rao, 2005)
- Sphaerospora markewitschi Donec, 1962
- Sphaerospora masovica Cohn, 1902
- Sphaerospora mayi Moser, Kent & Dennis, 1989
- Sphaerospora melenensis Fomena, Marques & Bouix, 1993
- Sphaerospora minima Kashkovsky, 1974
- Sphaerospora minuta Nie & Li, 1992
- Sphaerospora molnari Lom, Dyková, Pavlásková & Grupcheva, 1983
- Sphaerospora motemarini Holzer, Pecková, Patra, Brennan, Yanes-Roca & Main, 2013
- Sphaerospora mugili Yurakhno & Maltsev, 2002
- Sphaerospora mugilis (Sitja-Bobadilla & Alvarez-Pellitero, 1995)
- Sphaerospora notropis Fantham, Porter & Richardson, 1939
- Sphaerospora ohlmacheri (Gurley, 1893)
- Sphaerospora ojiroveci Dyková & Lom, 1997
- Sphaerospora olsoni Sanders, Jaramillo, Ashford, Feist, Lafferty & Kent, 2015
- Sphaerospora oncorhynchi Kent, Whitaker & Margolis, 1993
- Sphaerospora ovophila Xiao & Desser, 1997
- Sphaerospora paulini Lom, Desser & Dyková, 1989
- Sphaerospora perlata (Gurley, 1893)
- Sphaerospora pernicialis Léger, 1930
- Sphaerospora petruschewskii Shulman, 1962
- Sphaerospora plagiognathopis (Chen & Hsieh, 1984)
- Sphaerospora poljanskii Kulemina, 1969
- Sphaerospora ranae (Morelle, 1929)
- Sphaerospora reichenowi Jacob, 1953
- Sphaerospora renalis
- Sphaerospora renicola (Thélohan, 1895)
- Sphaerospora rostrata Thélohan, 1895
- Sphaerospora rota Zaika, 1961
- Sphaerospora rutili Patra, Bartošová-Sojková, Pecková, Fiala, Eszterbauer & Holzer, 2018
- Sphaerospora sangmelimaensis Fomena & Bouix, 1994
- Sphaerospora sapae Donec, 1962
- Sphaerospora saurogobii Ma, 1998
- Sphaerospora scardinii El-Matbouli & Hoffmann, 1992
- Sphaerospora schulmani (Rumyantsev, 1997)
- Sphaerospora sebasta Zhao, Al-Farraj, AL-Rasheid & Song, 2015
- Sphaerospora sevastopoli Naidenova, 1970
- Sphaerospora siluri Molnar, 1993
- Sphaerospora simplex (Kovaljova & Zubchenko, 1984)
- Sphaerospora sinensis Chen, 1998
- Sphaerospora sparidarum (Sitjá-Bobadilla & Alvarez-Pellitero, 2001)
- Sphaerospora sparis (Sitja-Bobadilla & Alvarez-Pellitero, 1995)
- Sphaerospora sphaerica Dogiel, 1948
- Sphaerospora sphaerula (Noble, 1939)
- Sphaerospora squalii Patra, Bartošová-Sojková, Pecková, Fiala, Eszterbauer & Holzer, 2018
- Sphaerospora subelegans Fantham, 1930
- Sphaerospora subsphaerica (Zaika, 1965)
- Sphaerospora terraenovae Lisnerová, 2022
- Sphaerospora testicularis Sitjà-Bobadilla & Alvarez-Pellitero, 1990
- Sphaerospora tilapiae Fomena, Marques & Bouix, 1993
- Sphaerospora tincae Plehn, 1925
- Sphaerospora toxabramis Wu & Li, 1986
- Sphaerospora truttae Fischer, Scherl, El-Matbouli & Hoffmann, 1986
- Sphaerospora undulans Meglitsch, 1970
- Sphaerospora yiduensis (Gong & Xie, 2000)
