= Catellotrachia winneckeana =

Conservation status
- Near Threatened (IUCN 2.3)

Scientific classification
- Kingdom: Animalia
- Phylum: Mollusca
- Class: Gastropoda
- Order: Stylommatophora
- Family: Camaenidae
- Genus: Catellotrachia
- Species: C. winneckeana

Binomial name
- Catellotrachia winneckeana (Tate, 1894)

Synonyms
- Hadra winneckeana Tate, 1894; Semotrachia winneckeana (Tate, 1894)

Species of gastropod

Catellotrachia winneckeana is a species of air-breathing land snail, a terrestrial pulmonate gastropod mollusk in the family Camaenidae. This species is endemic to Australia.
