= Catellotrachia euzyga =

Conservation status
- Vulnerable (IUCN 2.3)

Scientific classification
- Kingdom: Animalia
- Phylum: Mollusca
- Class: Gastropoda
- Order: Stylommatophora
- Family: Camaenidae
- Genus: Catellotrachia
- Species: C. euzyga

Binomial name
- Catellotrachia euzyga (Tate, 1894)

Synonyms
- Hadra euzyga Tate, 1894; Semotrachia euzyga (Tate, 1894)

Species of gastropod

Catellotrachia euzyga is a species of land snail in the family Camaenidae. It is endemic to the Northern Territory of Australia.
