= Granulomelon grandituberculatum =

Conservation status
- Near Threatened (IUCN 2.3)

Scientific classification
- Kingdom: Animalia
- Phylum: Mollusca
- Class: Gastropoda
- Order: Stylommatophora
- Family: Camaenidae
- Genus: Granulomelon
- Species: G. grandituberculatum

Binomial name
- Granulomelon grandituberculatum Tate, 1894

Species of gastropod

Granulomelon grandituberculatum is a species of air-breathing land snail, a terrestrial pulmonate gastropod mollusc in the family Camaenidae. This species is endemic to Australia.
