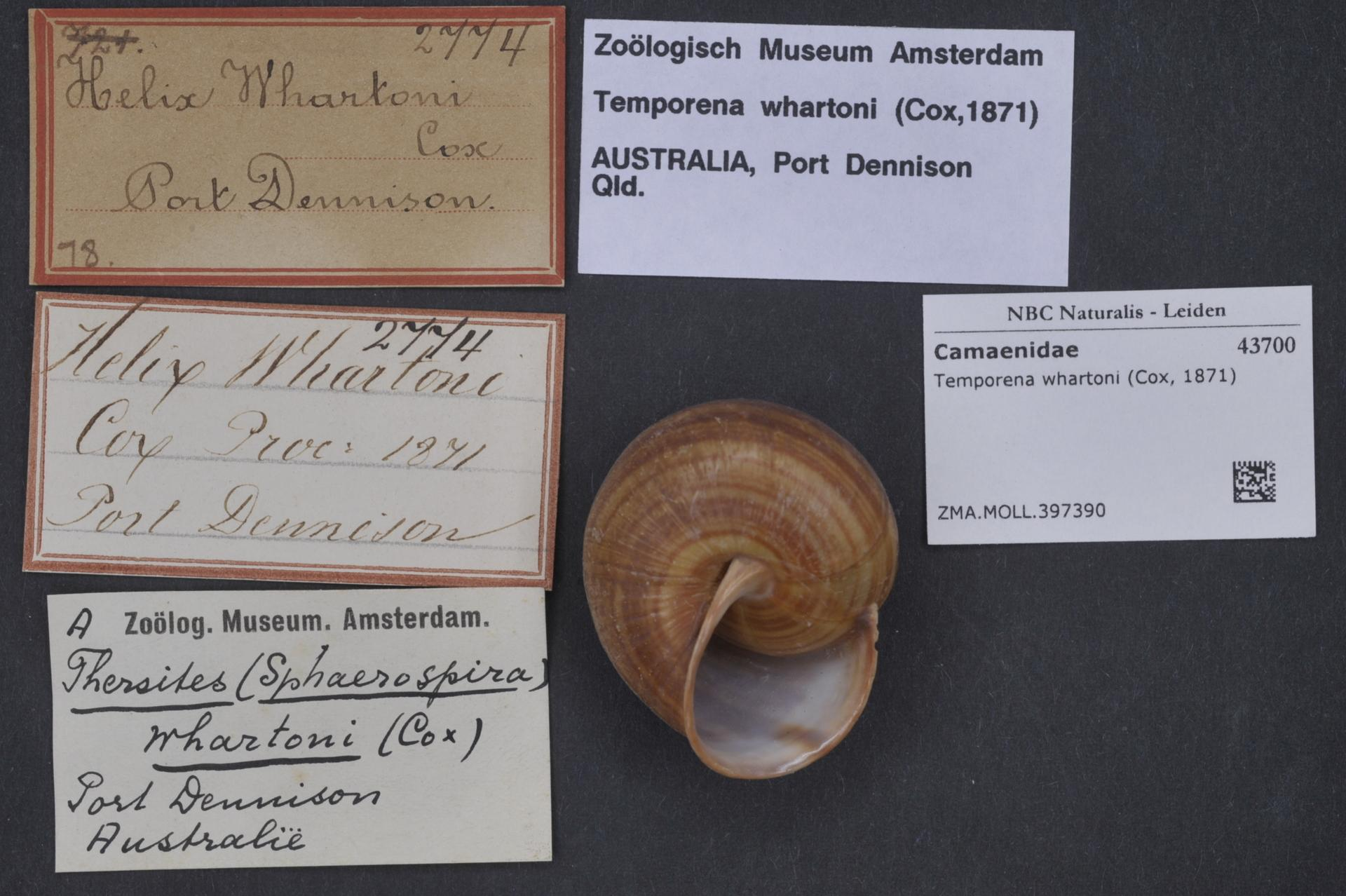

Conservation status
- Near Threatened (IUCN 2.3)

Scientific classification
- Kingdom: Animalia
- Phylum: Mollusca
- Class: Gastropoda
- Order: Stylommatophora
- Family: Camaenidae
- Genus: Temporena
- Species: T. whartoni

Binomial name
- Temporena whartoni (Cox, 1871)

Synonyms
- Helix whartoni Cox, 1871; Sphaerospira whartoni (Cox, 1871)

= Temporena whartoni =

Species of gastropod

Temporena whartoni, common name the Holbourne Island banded snail, is a species of air-breathing land snails, terrestrial pulmonate gastropod molluscs in the family Camaenidae.

This species is endemic to Australia.
