= Granulomelon adcockianum =

Scientific classification
- Kingdom: Animalia
- Phylum: Mollusca
- Class: Gastropoda
- Order: Stylommatophora
- Family: Camaenidae
- Genus: Granulomelon
- Species: G. adcockianum

Binomial name
- Granulomelon adcockianum (Bednall, 1894)

Synonyms
- Granulomelon arcigerens (Tate, 1894) (junior synonym); Hadra adcockiana Bednall, 1894 (original combination); Hadra arcigerens Tate, 1894; Hadra clydonigera Tate, 1894 (junior synonym); Pleuroxia adcockiana (Bednall, 1894)

Species of gastropod

Granulomelon adcockianum is a species of air-breathing land snail, a terrestrial pulmonate gastropod mollusc in the family Camaenidae.

== Distribution ==
This species is endemic to Australia.
