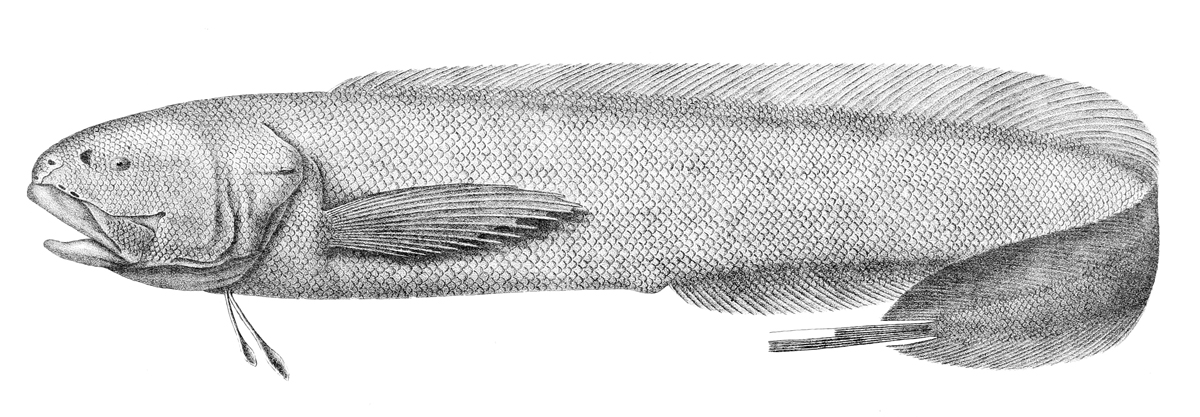
- Holcomycteronus brucei

Scientific classification
- Domain: Eukaryota
- Kingdom: Animalia
- Phylum: Chordata
- Class: Actinopterygii
- Order: Ophidiiformes
- Family: Ophidiidae
- Subfamily: Neobythitinae
- Genus: Holcomycteronus; Garman, 1899

Type species
- Holcomycteronus digittatus Garman, 1899

Synonyms
- Grimaldichthys Roule, 1913

= Holcomycteronus =

Genus of fishes

Holcomycteronus is a genus of cusk-eels. It includes Holcomycteronus profundissimus, long thought to be the deepest-living fish in the world's oceans.

== Species ==
There are currently six recognized species in this genus. Many were formerly considered species of Neobythites or Grimaldichthys.

- Holcomycteronus aequatoris (H. M. Smith & Radcliffe, 1913)
- Holcomycteronus brucei (Dollo, 1906)
- Holcomycteronus digittatus Garman, 1899
- Holcomycteronus profundissimus (Roule, 1913)
- Holcomycteronus pterotus (Alcock, 1890)
- Holcomycteronus squamosus (Roule, 1916)
