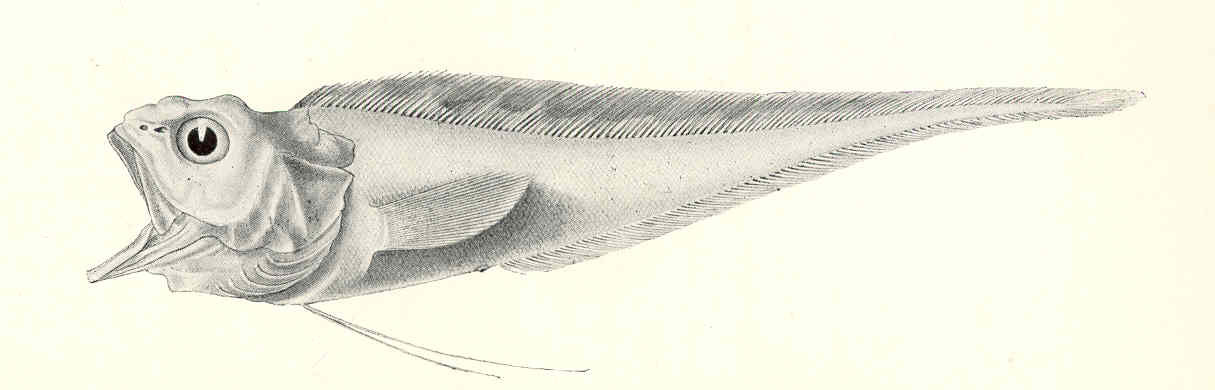

Scientific classification
- Kingdom: Animalia
- Phylum: Chordata
- Class: Actinopterygii
- Order: Ophidiiformes
- Family: Ophidiidae
- Subfamily: Neobythitinae
- Genus: Glyptophidium; Alcock, 1889

Type species
- Glyptophidium argenteum Alcock, 1889

= Glyptophidium =

Genus of fishes

Glyptophidium is a genus of cusk-eels.

== Species ==
There are currently seven recognized species in this genus:

- Glyptophidium argenteum Alcock, 1889
- Glyptophidium effulgens J. G. Nielsen & Machida, 1988
- Glyptophidium japonicum Kamohara, 1936 (Japanese cusk)
- Glyptophidium longipes Norman, 1939 (Bigeye brotula)
- Glyptophidium lucidum H. M. Smith & Radcliffe, 1913 (Sculptured cusk)
- Glyptophidium macropus Alcock, 1894
- Glyptophidium oceanium H. M. Smith & Radcliffe, 1913
