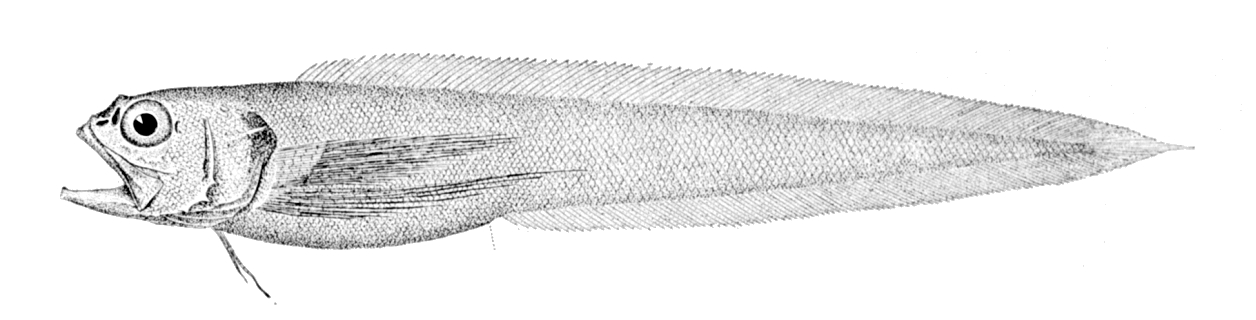
- Digitate Cusk-eel (D. introniger)

Scientific classification
- Kingdom: Animalia
- Phylum: Chordata
- Class: Actinopterygii
- Order: Ophidiiformes
- Family: Ophidiidae
- Subfamily: Neobythitinae
- Genus: Dicrolene; Goode & Bean, 1883

Type species
- Dicrolene introniger Goode & Bean, 1883

= Dicrolene =

Genus of fishes

Dicrolene is a genus of cusk-eels.

== Species ==
There are currently 15 recognized species in this genus. They are listed below along with their discoverer:

- Dicrolene filamentosa Garman, 1899
- Dicrolene gregoryi Trotter, 1926
- Dicrolene hubrechti M. C. W. Weber, 1913
- Dicrolene introniger Goode & T. H. Bean, 1883 (Digitate cusk-eel)
- Dicrolene kanazawai M. G. Grey, 1958
- Dicrolene longimana H. M. Smith & Radcliffe, 1913
- Dicrolene mesogramma Shcherbachev, 1980
- Dicrolene multifilis (Alcock, 1889) (Slender brotula)
- Dicrolene nigra Garman, 1899
- Dicrolene nigricaudis (Alcock, 1891)
- Dicrolene pallidus Hureau & J. G. Nielsen, 1981
- Dicrolene pullata Garman, 1899
- Dicrolene quinquarius (Günther, 1887)
- Dicrolene tristis H. M. Smith & Radcliffe, 1913
- Dicrolene vaillanti (Alcock, 1890)
