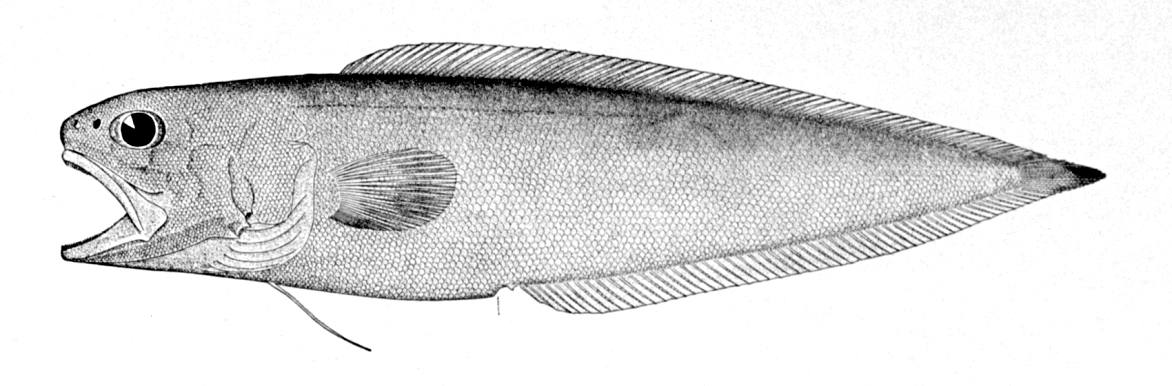
- M. agassizii

Scientific classification
- Kingdom: Animalia
- Phylum: Chordata
- Class: Actinopterygii
- Order: Ophidiiformes
- Family: Ophidiidae
- Subfamily: Neobythitinae
- Genus: Monomitopus; Alcock, 1890

Type species
- Sirembo nigripinnis Alcock 1889

= Monomitopus =

Genus of fishes

Monomitopus is a genus of cusk-eels. They are oviparous.

== Life cycle ==
Analysis of stable oxygen isotope composition of otoliths has shown that Monomitopus pallidus and Monomitopus kumae undergo an ontogenetic habitat shift, spending their early life pelagically in shallower waters, before descending to the deep-sea floor where they stay for rest of their lives. The larvae of these species have been reported to coil tightly and drift in the pelagic until settlement. A subset of species have been found to have a bilaterally paired hole or fenestra in the skull.

== Species ==
There are currently 14 recognized species in this genus:

- Monomitopus ainonaka M. Girard, Carter & Johnson, 2023
- Monomitopus agassizii (Goode & T. H. Bean, 1896)
- Monomitopus conjugator (Alcock, 1896)
- Monomitopus garmani (H. M. Smith & Radcliffe, 1913)
- Monomitopus kumae D. S. Jordan & C. L. Hubbs, 1925
- Monomitopus longiceps H. M. Smith & Radcliffe, 1913
- Monomitopus magnus H. J. Carter & Cohen, 1985
- Monomitopus malispinosus (Garman, 1899)
- Monomitopus metriostoma (Vaillant, 1888)
- Monomitopus microlepis H. M. Smith & Radcliffe, 1913
- Monomitopus nigripinnis (Alcock, 1889)
- Monomitopus pallidus H. M. Smith & Radcliffe, 1913
- Monomitopus torvus Garman, 1899
- Monomitopus vitiazi (J. G. Nielsen, 1971) (Spearcheek cusk)

Synonyms

Monomitopus americanus J. G. Nielsen, 1971 was recently reclassified as Selachophidium americanum.
