= Whiptail cusk =

Conservation status
- Least Concern (IUCN 3.1)

Scientific classification
- Kingdom: Animalia
- Phylum: Chordata
- Class: Actinopterygii
- Order: Ophidiiformes
- Family: Ophidiidae
- Subfamily: Neobythitinae
- Genus: Hypopleuron
- Species: H. caninum

Binomial name
- Hypopleuron caninum H. M. Smith & Radcliffe, 1913

Species of fish

The whiptail cusk (Hypopleuron caninum) is a species of cusk-eel found in the Indian and western Pacific Oceans where it occurs at depths of from 300 to 575 metres (980 to 1,890 ft). This species grows to a length of 57 centimetres (22 in) SL. It is the only known member of its genus.
