= Barbed brotula =

Conservation status
- Least Concern (IUCN 3.1)

Scientific classification
- Domain: Eukaryota
- Kingdom: Animalia
- Phylum: Chordata
- Class: Actinopterygii
- Order: Ophidiiformes
- Family: Ophidiidae
- Subfamily: Neobythitinae
- Genus: Selachophidium
- Species: S. guentheri

Binomial name
- Selachophidium guentheri Gilchrist, 1903

Species of fish

The barbed brotula (Selachophidium guentheri) is a species of cusk-eel found in the Indian and Atlantic Oceans off of the southern coast of Africa where it is found at depths of from 200 to 980 metres (660 to 3,220 ft). This species grows to a length of 30 centimetres (12 in) TL. This species is one of two member of its genus, the other being Selachophidium americanum. The barbed brotula has been found to have an ossified swelling of bone in the back of the skull that is connected to the pectoral girdle, vertebral column, and gas bladder via soft tissue.
