= Filament cusk =

Conservation status
- Least Concern (IUCN 3.1)

Scientific classification
- Kingdom: Animalia
- Phylum: Chordata
- Class: Actinopterygii
- Order: Ophidiiformes
- Family: Ophidiidae
- Subfamily: Neobythitinae
- Genus: Homostolus
- Species: H. acer

Binomial name
- Homostolus acer H. M. Smith & Radcliffe, 1913

Synonyms
- Homostolus japonicus Matsubara, 1943

Species of fish

The filament cusk (Homostolus acer) is a species of cusk-eel found in the western Pacific Ocean from the waters off of Japan to Australia and New Caledonia where it occurs at depths of from 300 to 1,000 metres (980 to 3,280 ft). This species grows to a length of 18.4 centimetres (7.2 in) SL and is of minor importance to commercial fisheries. It is the only known member of its genus.
