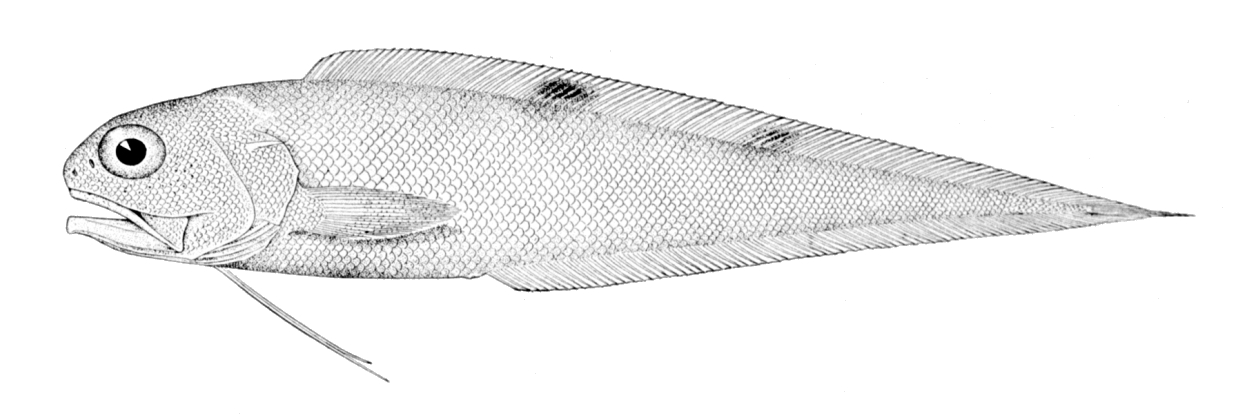
- Twospot Brotula (N. gilli)
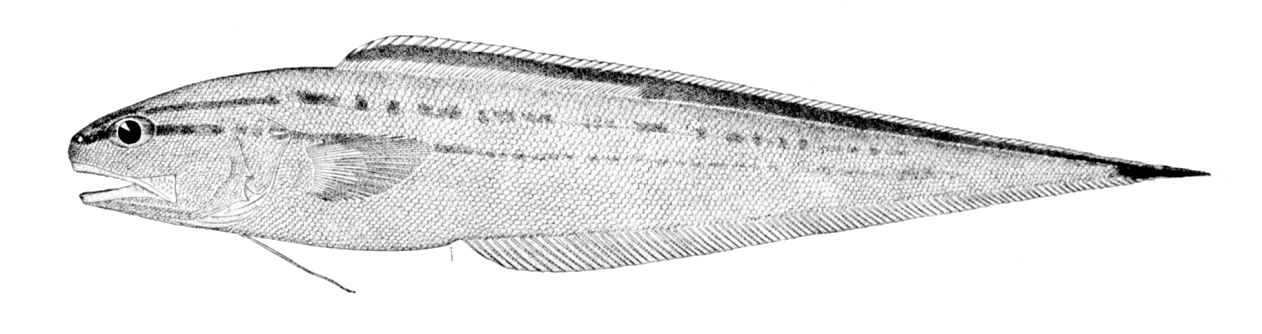
- Stripefin Brotula (N. marginatus)

Scientific classification
- Kingdom: Animalia
- Phylum: Chordata
- Class: Actinopterygii
- Order: Ophidiiformes
- Family: Ophidiidae
- Subfamily: Neobythitinae
- Genus: Neobythites; Goode & Bean, 1885

Type species
- Neobythites gilli Goode & Bean, 1885

Synonyms
- Benthocometes Goode & Bean, 1896; Watasea Jordan & Snyder, 1901

= Neobythites =

Genus of fishes

Neobythites is a genus of cusk-eels.

== Species ==
These are the currently recognized species in this genus:

- Neobythites alcocki J. G. Nielsen, 2002
- Neobythites analis Barnard, 1927 (Black-edged cusk-eel)
- Neobythites andamanensis J. G. Nielsen, 2002
- Neobythites australiensis J. G. Nielsen, 2002 (Australian cusk)
- Neobythites bimaculatus J. G. Nielsen, 1997 (Twospot cusk)
- Neobythites bimarginatus Fourmanoir & Rivaton, 1979
- Neobythites braziliensis J. G. Nielsen, 1999
- Neobythites crosnieri J. G. Nielsen, 1995
- Neobythites elongatus J. G. Nielsen & Retzer, 1994
- Neobythites fasciatus H. M. Smith & Radcliffe, 1913
- Neobythites fijiensis J. G. Nielsen, 2002
- Neobythites franzi J. G. Nielsen, 2002 (Franz's cusk)
- Neobythites gilli Goode & T. H. Bean, 1885 (Twospot brotula)
- Neobythites japonicus Uiblein & J. G. Nielsen, 2023
- Neobythites javaensis J. G. Nielsen, 2002
- Neobythites jonathan Uiblein & J. G. Nielsen, 2023
- Neobythites kenyaensis J. G. Nielsen, 1995
- Neobythites longipes H. M. Smith & Radcliffe, 1913 (Longray cusk)
- Neobythites longispinis J. G. Nielsen, 2002
- Neobythites longiventralis J. G. Nielsen, 1997
- Neobythites machidai Ohashi, J. G. Nielsen & Yabe, 2012
- Neobythites macrocelli J. G. Nielsen, 2002
- Neobythites macrops Günther, 1887 (Spotfin cusk)
- Neobythites malayanus M. C. W. Weber, 1913
- Neobythites malhaensis J. G. Nielsen, 1995
- Neobythites marginatus Goode & T. H. Bean, 1886 (Stripefin brotula)
- Neobythites marianaensis J. G. Nielsen, 2002
- Neobythites marquesaensis J. G. Nielsen, 2002
- Neobythites meteori J. G. Nielsen, 1995
- Neobythites monocellatus J. G. Nielsen, 1999
- Neobythites multidigitatus J. G. Nielsen, 1999
- Neobythites multiocellatus J. G. Nielsen, Uiblein & Mincarone, 2009
- Neobythites multistriatus J. G. Nielsen & Quéro, 1991
- Neobythites musorstomi J. G. Nielsen, 2002
- Neobythites natalensis J. G. Nielsen, 1995
- Neobythites neocaledoniensis J. G. Nielsen, 1997
- Neobythites nigriventris J. G. Nielsen, 2002 (Blackbelly cusk)
- Neobythites ocellatus Günther, 1887
- Neobythites pako Uiblein & J. G. Nielsen, 2023
- Neobythites pallidus J. G. Nielsen, 1997 (Pale cusk)
- Neobythites purus H. M. Smith & Radcliffe, 1913 (Pure cusk)
- Neobythites sereti J. G. Nielsen, 2002
- Neobythites sinensis J. G. Nielsen, 2002
- Neobythites sivicola (D. S. Jordan & Snyder, 1901)
- Neobythites soelae J. G. Nielsen, 2002 (Soela cusk)
- Neobythites somaliaensis J. G. Nielsen, 1995
- Neobythites steatiticus Alcock, 1894
- Neobythites stefanovi J. G. Nielsen & Uiblein, 1993
- Neobythites stelliferoides C. H. Gilbert, 1890 (Thread brotula)
- Neobythites stigmosus Machida, 1984
- Neobythites superocellatus Uiblein & J. G. Nielsen, 2023
- Neobythites trifilis Kotthaus, 1979
- Neobythites unicolor J. G. Nielsen & Retzer, 1994
- Neobythites unimaculatus H. M. Smith & Radcliffe, 1913 (Onespot cusk)
- Neobythites vityazi J. G. Nielsen, 1995
- Neobythites zonatus J. G. Nielsen, 1997
- Neobythites zora Uiblein & J. G. Nielsen, 2023
