= Mastigopterus =

Conservation status
- Least Concern (IUCN 3.1)

Scientific classification
- Kingdom: Animalia
- Phylum: Chordata
- Class: Actinopterygii
- Division: Teleostei
- Order: Ophidiiformes
- Family: Ophidiidae
- Subfamily: Neobythitinae
- Genus: Mastigopterus
- Species: M. imperator

Binomial name
- Mastigopterus imperator H. M. Smith & Radcliffe, 1913

Species of fish

Mastigopterus imperator is a species of cusk-eel found in the Indian and Pacific Oceans where it occurs at depths of from 394 to 2,365 metres (1,290 to 7,760 ft). This species grows to a length of 53.5 centimetres (21.1 in) SL. It is the only known member of its genus.
