= Enchelybrotula =

Scientific classification
- Kingdom: Animalia
- Phylum: Chordata
- Class: Actinopterygii
- Order: Ophidiiformes
- Family: Ophidiidae
- Subfamily: Neobythitinae
- Genus: Enchelybrotula; H. M. Smith & Radcliffe, 1913

Type species
- Enchelybrotula paucidens Smith & Radcliffe, 1913

Genus of fishes

Enchelybrotula is a genus of deep-water cusk-eels.

== Species ==
There are currently two recognized species in this genus:

- Enchelybrotula gomoni Cohen, 1982
- Enchelybrotula paucidens H. M. Smith & Radcliffe, 1913
