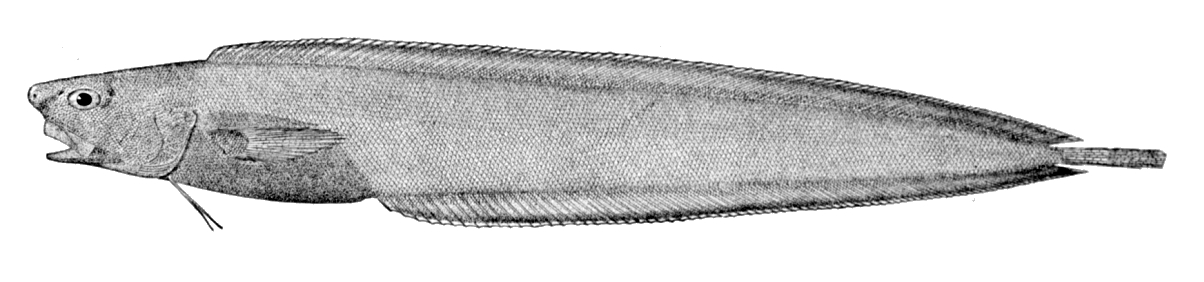
- Barathrodemus manatinus

Scientific classification
- Kingdom: Animalia
- Phylum: Chordata
- Class: Actinopterygii
- Order: Ophidiiformes
- Family: Ophidiidae
- Subfamily: Neobythitinae
- Genus: Barathrodemus; Goode & T. H. Bean, 1883

Type species
- Barathrodemus manatinus Goode & Bean, 1883

= Barathrodemus =

Genus of fishes

Barathrodemus is a genus of cusk-eels found in deep waters.

== Species ==
There are currently two recognized species in this genus:

- Barathrodemus manatinus Goode & T. H. Bean, 1883
- Barathrodemus nasutus H. M. Smith & Radcliffe, 1913
