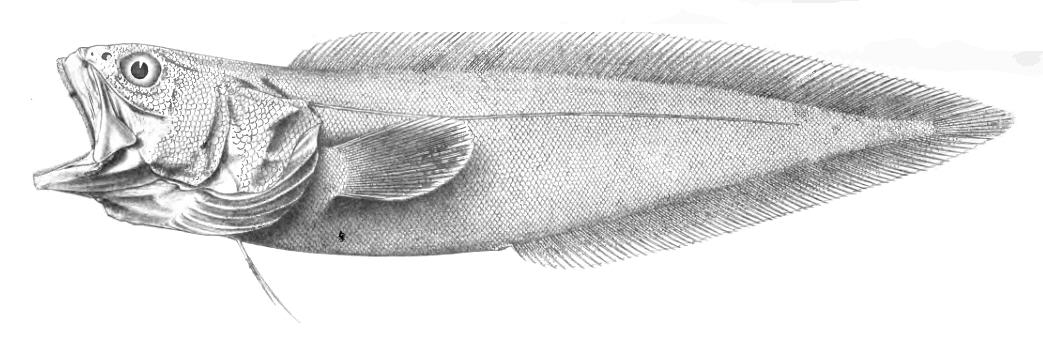
- Pycnocraspedum squamipinne

Scientific classification
- Kingdom: Animalia
- Phylum: Chordata
- Class: Actinopterygii
- Order: Ophidiiformes
- Family: Ophidiidae
- Subfamily: Neobythitinae
- Genus: Pycnocraspedum; Alcock, 1889

Type species
- Pycnocraspedum squamipinne Alcock, 1889

= Pycnocraspedum =

Genus of fishes

Pycnocraspedum is a genus of cusk-eels.

== Species ==
There are currently five recognized species in this genus:

- Pycnocraspedum armatum Gosline, 1954
- Pycnocraspedum fulvum Machida, 1984
- Pycnocraspedum microlepis (Matsubara, 1943)
- Pycnocraspedum phyllosoma (A. E. Parr, 1933)
- Pycnocraspedum squamipinne Alcock, 1889 (Pelagic cusk)
