= Holcomycteronus profundissimus =

Conservation status
- Least Concern (IUCN 3.1)

Scientific classification
- Kingdom: Animalia
- Phylum: Chordata
- Class: Actinopterygii
- Order: Ophidiiformes
- Family: Ophidiidae
- Genus: Holcomycteronus
- Species: H. profundissimus

Binomial name
- Holcomycteronus profundissimus (Roule, 1913)
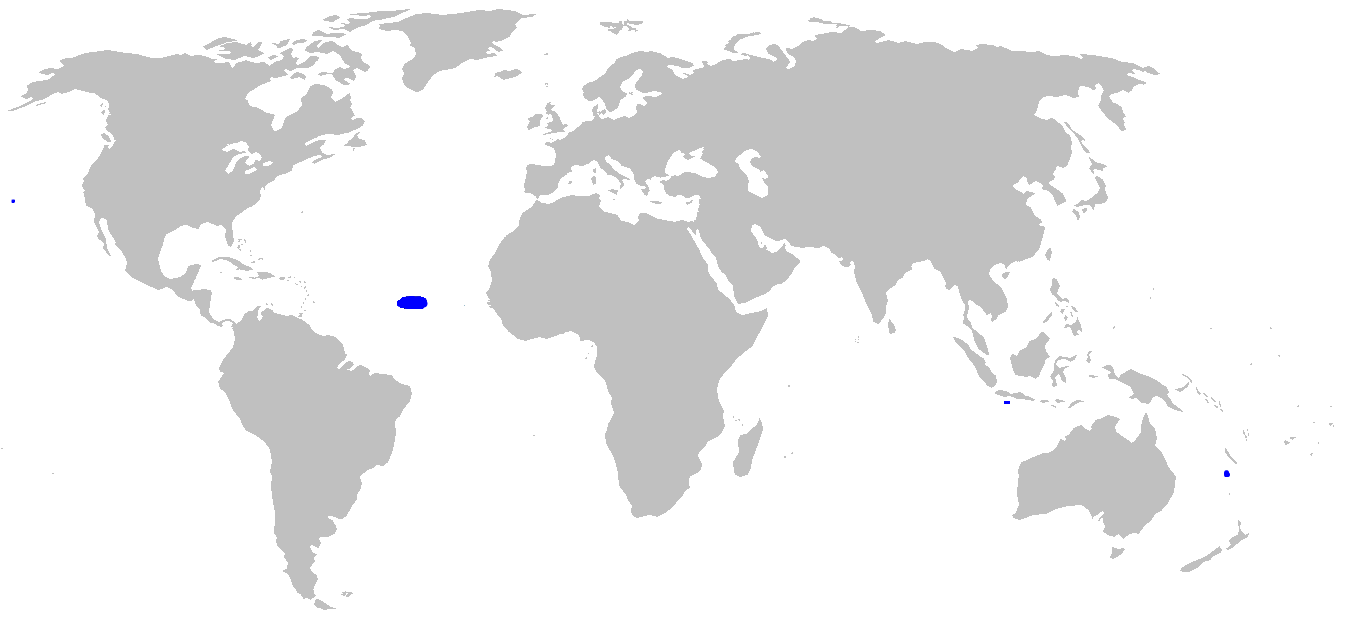
- Range map

Synonyms
- Grimaldichthys profundissimus

Species of fish

Holcomycteronus profundissimus, also known by its synonym Grimaldichthys profundissimus, (Danish: Grimaldis slangekvabbe; Finnish: Grimaldikala; Italian: Pesce di Grimaldi) is a species of deep-sea fish in the cusk-eel family.

The fish has an elongated body of a uniform sallow yellowish color. It is about 22 cm (9 in) in length and has rudimentary eyes. Very little is known about its habitat, ecology and biology.

== History ==
The first specimen was found in Atlantic waters in August 1901 at a depth of 6,035 m (19,800 ft) in the hadal zone southwest of the Cape Verde Islands. It was caught during an oceanographic cruise by Princess Alice of Monaco using a fish trap designed by her husband Prince Albert I. The genus to which this species belongs was initially named Grimaldichthys after the ruling family of Monaco.

Other specimens of this fish were recorded later in the Pacific and the Eastern Indian oceans at depths between 5,180 and 7,160 m (16,990–23,490 ft). For many decades it was thought to be the fish living at the greatest depth in the world until the species Abyssobrotula galatheae—one specimen of which was found at a depth of over 8,000 m (26,000 ft)—was described in 1977.

== See also ==
- List of organisms named after famous people (born before 1900)
