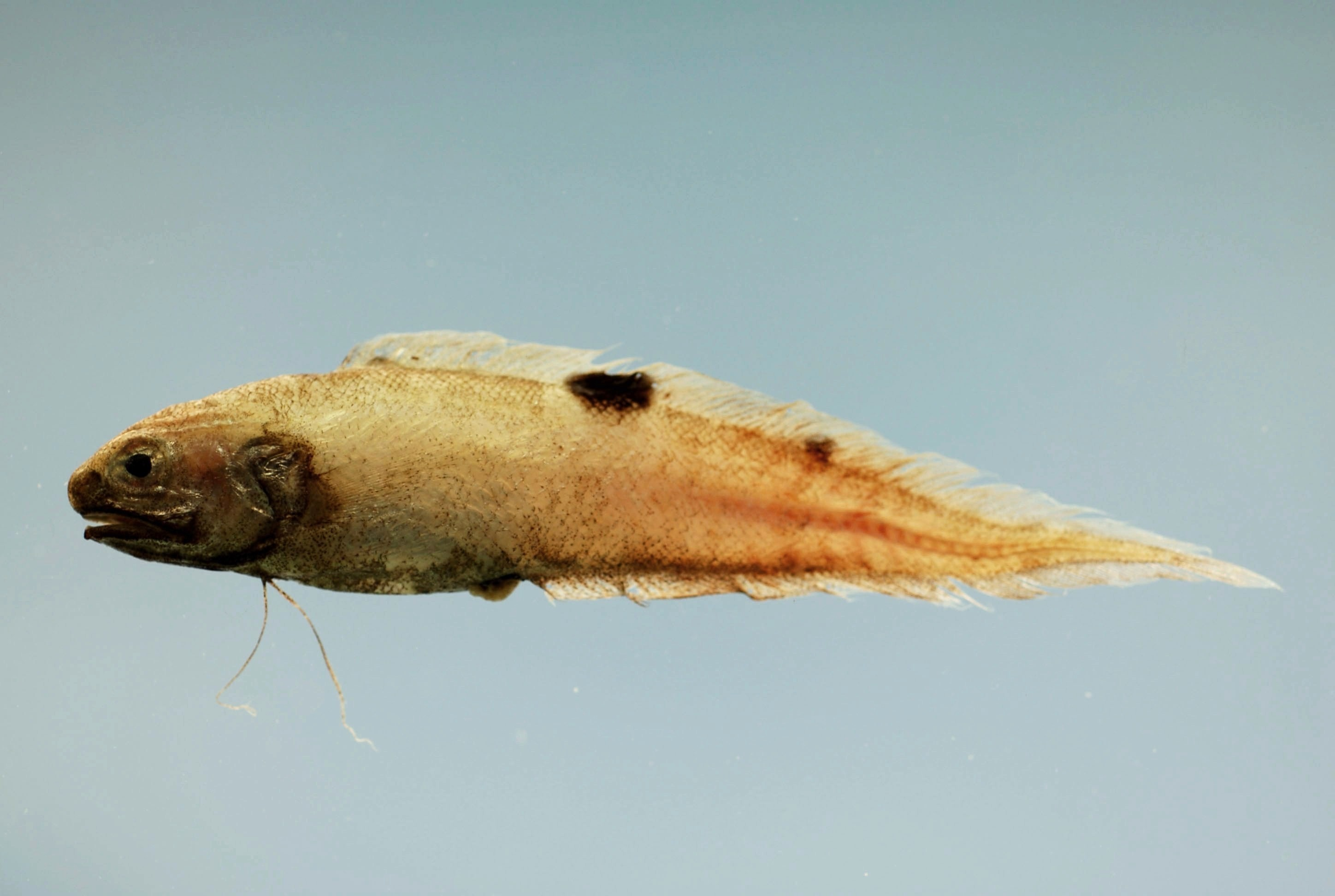
- Twospot brotula (Neobythites gilli). Gulf of Mexico.

Scientific classification
- Kingdom: Animalia
- Phylum: Chordata
- Class: Actinopterygii
- Order: Ophidiiformes
- Family: Ophidiidae
- Subfamily: Neobythitinae; Radcliffe, 1913

= Neobythitinae =

Neobythitinae Temporal range: Early Eocene to present

Subfamily of fishes

Neobythitinae is a subfamily of cusk eel from the family Ophidiidae. They are mostly fishes of deeper waters, occurring from the continental shelf down to as deep as 8,370 metres (27,460 ft) at the bottom of the Puerto Rico Trench where the deepest known fish, Abyssobrotula galatheae, has been taken.

== Genera ==
The following genera make up the subfamily:

- Genus Abyssobrotula
- Genus Acanthonus
- Genus Alcockia
- Genus Apagesoma
- Genus Barathrites
- Genus Barathrodemus
- Genus Bassogigas
- Genus Bassozetus
- Genus Bathyonus
- Genus Benthocometes
- Genus Dannevigia
- Genus Dicrolene
- Genus Enchelybrotula
- Genus Epetriodus
- Genus Eretmichthys
- Genus Glyptophidium
- Genus Holcomycteronus
- Genus Homostolus
- Genus Hoplobrotula
- Genus Hypopleuron
- Genus Lamprogrammus
- Genus Leptobrotula
- Genus Leucicorus
- Genus Luciobrotula
- Genus Mastigopterus
- Genus Monomitopus
- Genus Neobythites
- Genus Neobythitoides
- Genus Penopus
- Genus Petrotyx
- Genus Porogadus
- Genus Pycnocraspedum
- Genus Selachophidium
- Genus Sirembo
- Genus Spectrunculus
- Genus Spottobrotula
- Genus Tauredophidium
- Genus Typhlonus
- Genus Ventichthys
- Genus Xyelacyba

The earliest known member of the subfamily may potentially be Eolamprogrammus from the earliest Eocene of Turkmenistan.
