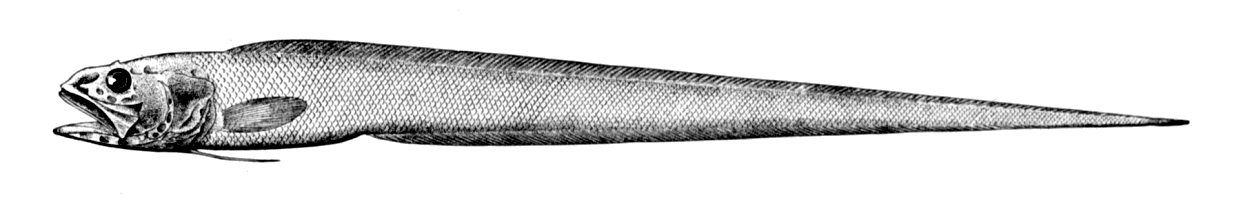
- P. catena
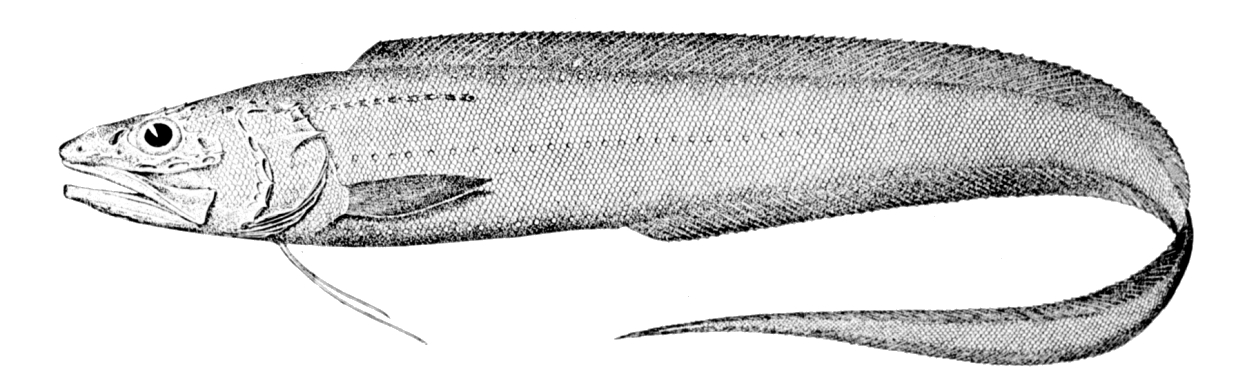
- Slender Cusk-eel (P. miles)

Scientific classification
- Kingdom: Animalia
- Phylum: Chordata
- Class: Actinopterygii
- Order: Ophidiiformes
- Family: Ophidiidae
- Subfamily: Neobythitinae
- Genus: Porogadus; Goode & Bean, 1885

Type species
- Porogadus miles Goode & Bean, 1885

= Porogadus =

Genus of fishes

Porogadus is a genus of cusk-eels.

== Species ==
There are currently 13 recognized species in this genus:

- Porogadus abyssalis Nybelin, 1957
- Porogadus atripectus Garman, 1899
- Porogadus catena (Goode & Bean, 1885)
- Porogadus gracilis (Günther, 1878) (Cavernous assfish)
- Porogadus guentheri D. S. Jordan & Fowler, 1902
- Porogadus longiceps Garman, 1899
- Porogadus melampeplus (Alcock, 1896)
- Porogadus melanocephalus (Alcock, 1891)
- Porogadus miles Goode & T. H. Bean, 1885 (Slender cusk-eel)
- Porogadus nudus Vaillant, 1888
- Porogadus silus H. J. Carter & Sulak, 1984
- Porogadus subarmatus Vaillant, 1888
- Porogadus trichiurus (Alcock, 1890)
