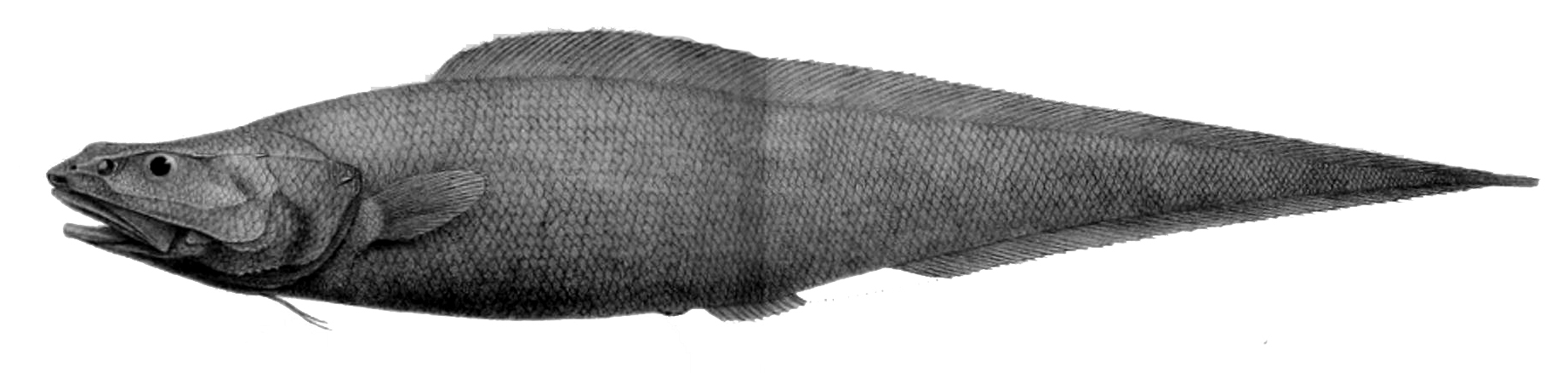

Scientific classification
- Kingdom: Animalia
- Phylum: Chordata
- Class: Actinopterygii
- Division: Teleostei
- Order: Ophidiiformes
- Family: Ophidiidae
- Subfamily: Neobythitinae
- Genus: Alcockia; Goode & T. H. Bean, 1896
- Species: A. rostrata

Binomial name
- Alcockia rostrata (Günther, 1887)

= Alcockia =

Genus of fishes

Alcockia is a genus in the cusk-eel family. It contains only the single species Alcockia rostrata, which is found in the Indian and western Pacific Oceans, at depths of from 2,761 to 4,040 metres (9,058 to 13,255 ft). This species grows to a length of 35 centimetres (14 in) SL. The generic name Alcockia honours Alfred William Alcock (1859-1933) who was the surgeon-naturalist aboard the R.I.M.S. Investigator.
