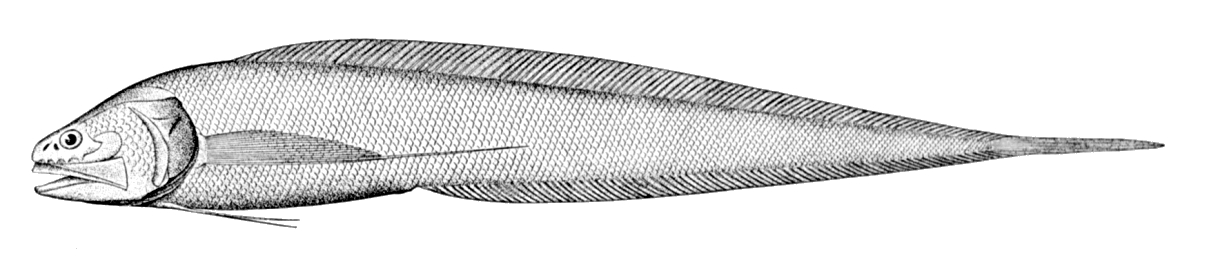
- B. pectoralis

Scientific classification
- Kingdom: Animalia
- Phylum: Chordata
- Class: Actinopterygii
- Order: Ophidiiformes
- Family: Ophidiidae
- Subfamily: Neobythitinae
- Genus: Bathyonus; Goode & Bean, 1885

Type species
- Bathynectes laticeps Günther, 1878

= Bathyonus =

Genus of fishes

Bathyonus is a genus of cusk-eels.

== Species ==
There are currently three recognized species in this genus:

- Bathyonus caudalis (Garman, 1899)
- Bathyonus laticeps (Günther, 1878)
- Bathyonus pectoralis Goode & Bean, 1885
