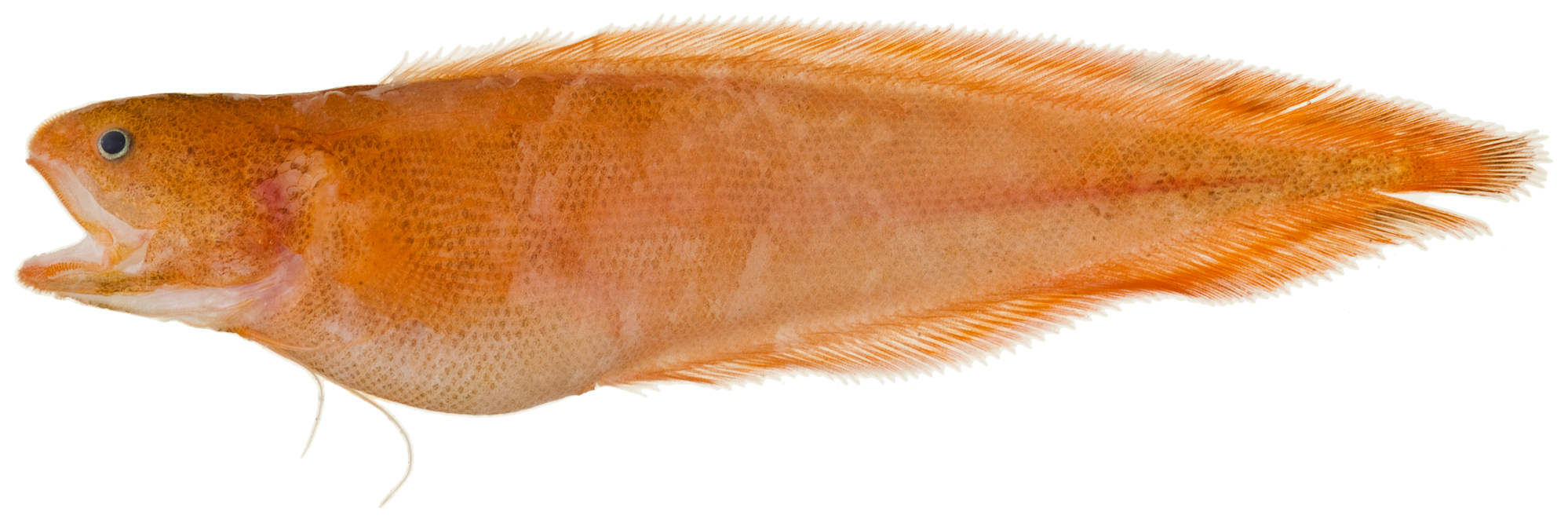
- Petrotyx sanguineus

Scientific classification
- Domain: Eukaryota
- Kingdom: Animalia
- Phylum: Chordata
- Class: Actinopterygii
- Order: Ophidiiformes
- Family: Ophidiidae
- Subfamily: Neobythitinae
- Genus: Petrotyx; Heller & Snodgrass, 1903

Type species
- Petrotyx hopkinsi Heller & Snodgrass, 1903

= Petrotyx =

Genus of fishes

Petrotyx is a genus of reef-dwelling cusk-eels.

== Species ==
There are currently two recognized species in this genus:

- Petrotyx hopkinsi Heller & Snodgrass, 1903 (Velvetnose brotula)
- Petrotyx sanguineus (Meek & Hildebrand, 1928) (Redfin brotula)
