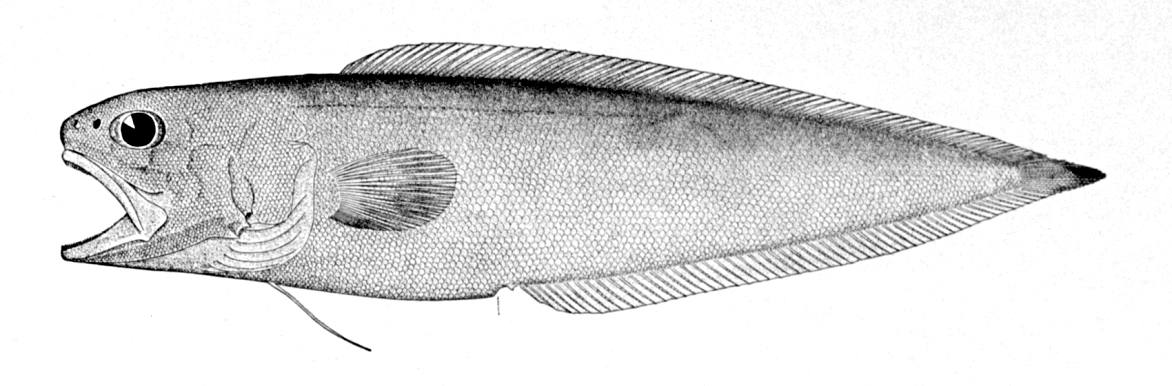

Conservation status
- Least Concern (IUCN 3.1)

Scientific classification
- Kingdom: Animalia
- Phylum: Chordata
- Class: Actinopterygii
- Order: Ophidiiformes
- Family: Ophidiidae
- Genus: Monomitopus
- Species: M. agassizii

Binomial name
- Monomitopus agassizii (Goode & Bean, 1986)

= Monomitopus agassizii =

Species of fish

Monomitopus agassizii is a fish species from the genus Monomitopus. It can be found in the Western Central Atlantic from the Caribbean Sea all the way to the Gulf of Mexico. It has small scales, the upper jaw is enlarged, and with the exception of the gill membrane and lips, its head is mostly covered with scales.
