= Neobythitoides serratus =

Scientific classification
- Kingdom: Animalia
- Phylum: Chordata
- Class: Actinopterygii
- Order: Ophidiiformes
- Family: Ophidiidae
- Subfamily: Neobythitinae
- Genus: Neobythitoides
- Species: N. serratus

Binomial name
- Neobythitoides serratus J. G. Nielsen & Machida, 2006

Species of fish

Neobythitoides serratus is a species of cusk-eel found in the East China Sea near the Ryukyu Islands. It is found at a depth of at least 950 metres (3,120 ft). This species grows to a length of 12 centimetres (4.7 in) SL. It is the only known member of its genus.
