= East-Pacific ventbrotula =

Conservation status
- Data Deficient (IUCN 3.1)

Scientific classification
- Kingdom: Animalia
- Phylum: Chordata
- Class: Actinopterygii
- Order: Ophidiiformes
- Family: Ophidiidae
- Subfamily: Neobythitinae
- Genus: Ventichthys
- Species: V. biospeedoi

Binomial name
- Ventichthys biospeedoi Neilsen, Møller & Segonzac, 2006

Species of fish

The East Pacific ventbrotula (Ventichthys biospeedoi) is a species of cusk-eel found around thermal vents on the southern East Pacific Rise at depths of about 2,586 metres (8,484 ft). This species grows to a length of 28.2 centimetres (11.1 in) SL. It is the only known member of its genus. The generic name is a compound of vent, for the Oasis hydrothermal vent on the south East Pacific Rise (at a depth of 2,586 metres (8,484 ft)) and the Greek ichthys meaning "fish", while the specific name refers to the French BIOSPEEDO expedition to the south East Pacific Rise which collected the type specimen in 2004.
