= Nolfophidion =

Scientific classification
- Kingdom: Animalia
- Phylum: Chordata
- Class: Actinopterygii
- Order: Ophidiiformes
- Genus: †Nolfophidion; Schwarzhans, 1980

Extinct genus of fishes

Nolfophidion is an extinct genus of prehistoric ray-finned fish.
