= Protobrotula =

Protobrotula Temporal range: Early Oligocene

Scientific classification
- Domain: Eukaryota
- Kingdom: Animalia
- Phylum: Chordata
- Class: Actinopterygii
- Order: Ophidiiformes
- Genus: †Protobrotula; Danil'chenko, 1960

Extinct genus of fishes

Protobrotula is an extinct genus of prehistoric bony fish that lived during the early Oligocene epoch.
