= Selachophidium =

Scientific classification
- Kingdom: Animalia
- Phylum: Chordata
- Class: Actinopterygii
- Order: Ophidiiformes
- Family: Ophidiidae
- Subfamily: Neobythitinae
- Genus: Selachophidium; Gilchrist, 1903

Type species
- Selachophidium guentheri Gilchrist, 1903

Genus of fishes

Selachophidium is a genus of cusk-eels. They are oviparous.

== Species ==
There are currently 2 recognized species in this genus:

- Selachophidium americanum Nielsen, 1971
- Selachophidium guentheri Gilchrist, 1903

Synonyms

- Selachophidium vitiazi Nielsen, 1971; valid as Monomitopus vitiazi (Nielsen, 1971)
