= Australian tusk =

Conservation status
- Least Concern (IUCN 3.1)

Scientific classification
- Kingdom: Animalia
- Phylum: Chordata
- Class: Actinopterygii
- Order: Ophidiiformes
- Family: Ophidiidae
- Subfamily: Neobythitinae
- Genus: Dannevigia
- Species: D. tusca

Binomial name
- Dannevigia tusca Whitley, 1941

Species of fish

The Australian tusk, Dannevigia tusca, is a species of cusk-eel found in the waters off of the Great Australian Bight occasionally to Bass Strait at depths from 115 to 400 m (380 to 1,310 ft). This species grows to 56 cm (22 in) in total length. It is the only known member of its genus and the generic name honours Harold Christian Dannevig (1860-1914) who was the Director of Fisheries for the Australian government, who collected type specimen and who was later lost at sea when the fisheries research vessel he was working on vanished without a trace.
