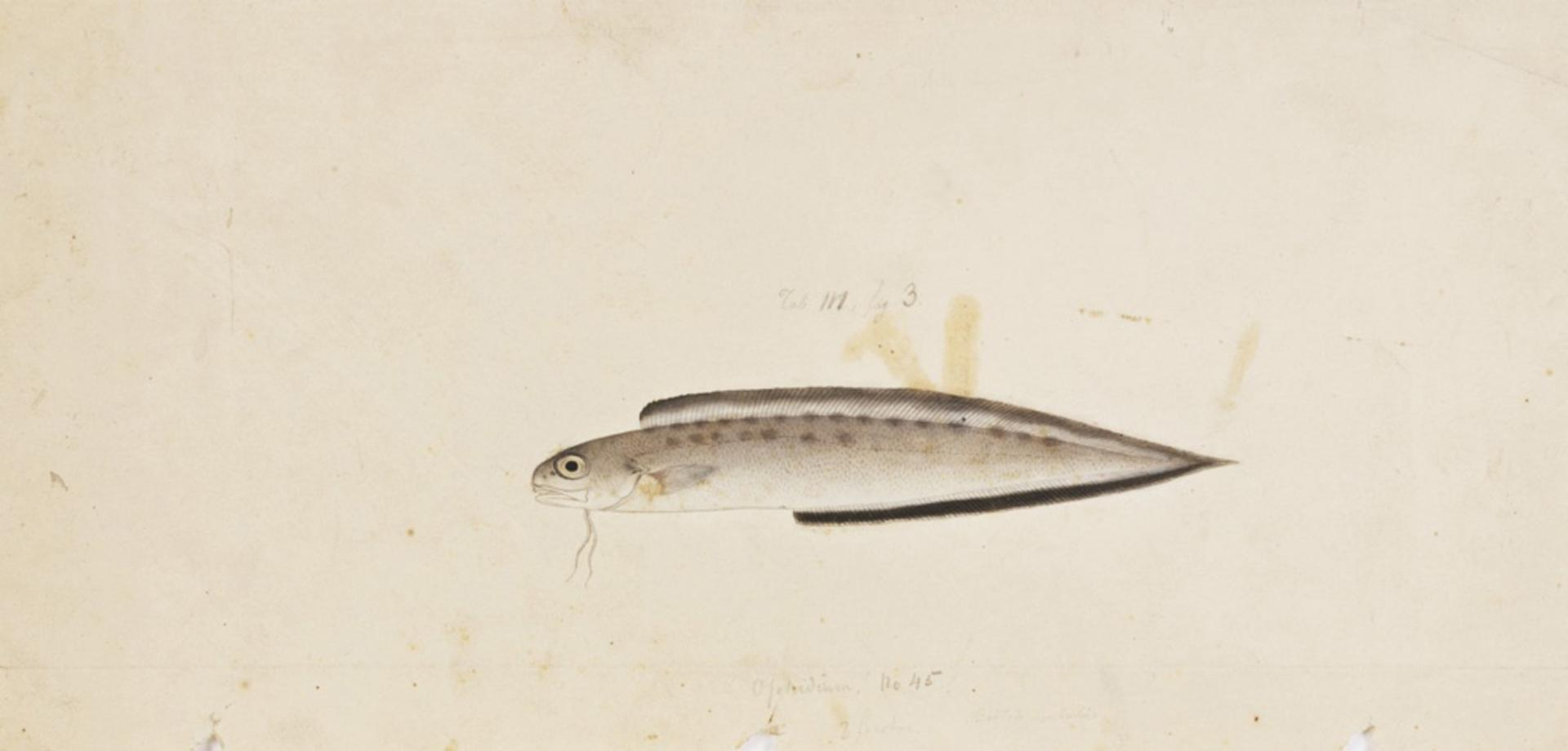
- Sirembo imberbis

Scientific classification
- Kingdom: Animalia
- Phylum: Chordata
- Class: Actinopterygii
- Division: Teleostei
- Order: Ophidiiformes
- Family: Ophidiidae
- Subfamily: Neobythitinae
- Genus: Sirembo; Bleeker, 1857

Type species
- Brotula imberbis Temminck & Schlegel, 1846

Synonyms
- Brotella Kaup, 1858; Umalius Herre & Herald, 1951

= Sirembo =

Genus of fishes

Sirembo is a genus of cusk-eels of the subfamily Neobythitinae, family Ophidiidae, which are found in the Indian and Pacific Oceans. The species in this genus have a rather robust body with the dorsal fin originating over vertebrae 1–5. The head and bod are completely covered in scales, they have large eyes which are almost equal in diameter to the length of snout, the pelvic fins have two rays which are joined together within an area of tough skin, They have a short spine on the operculum which does not extend to the posterior edge of the head. Their coloration is variable but almost all species have black spots or eyespots on the dorsal fin, sometimes both, while the middle part of the anal fin frequently has a black band. The body and/or head are marked with diagonal or horizontal dark stripes or horizontal rows of quite large dusky spots.

The generic name is derived for the common name for the golden cusk in Japanese, sirembo.

== Species ==
There are currently 5 recognized species in this genus, although FishBase only recognizes 3:

- Sirembo amaculata Cohen & J. G. Nielsen, 1982 (Lined cusk)
- Sirembo imberbis Temminck & Schlegel, 1846 (Golden cusk)
- Sirembo jerdoni F. Day, 1888 (Brown-banded cusk-eel)
- Sirembo metachroma Cohen & C. R. Robins, 1986 (Chameleon cusk)
- Sirembo wami J. G. Nielsen, Schwarzhans & Uiblein, 2014
