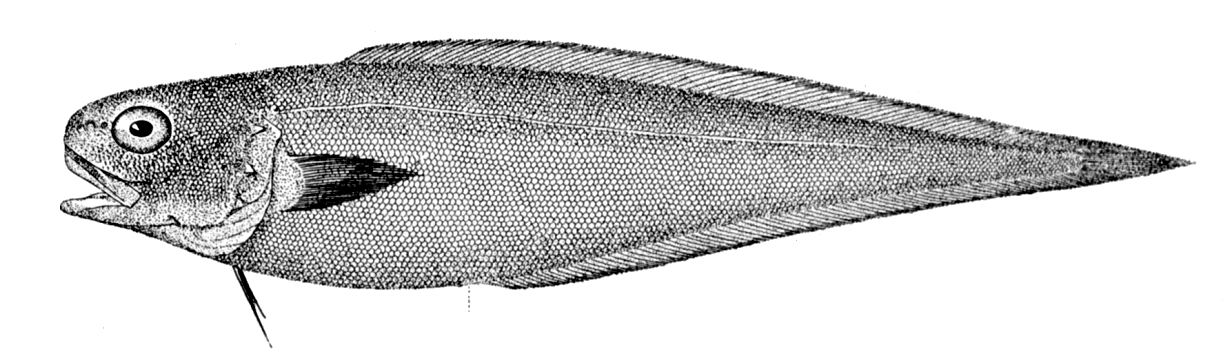
- B. robustus

Scientific classification
- Kingdom: Animalia
- Phylum: Chordata
- Class: Actinopterygii
- Order: Ophidiiformes
- Family: Ophidiidae
- Subfamily: Neobythitinae
- Genus: Benthocometes; Goode & Bean, 1896

Type species
- Neobythites robustus Goode & Bean, 1886

= Benthocometes =

Genus of fishes

Benthocometes is a genus of cusk-eels.

== Species ==
There are currently two recognized species in this genus:

- Benthocometes australiensis J. G. Nielsen, 2010
- Benthocometes robustus (Goode & Bean, 1886)

== Natural History of Benthocometes robustus ==
Benthocometes robustus is known to inhabit deep-sea environments, primarily residing at depths between 2,400 and 4,000 meters (7,900 and 13,100 ft) in the western North Atlantic. This species has been observed in areas characterized by soft sediments, where it likely feeds on small benthic organisms, utilizing its elongated body to navigate through its dark and complex habitat.
