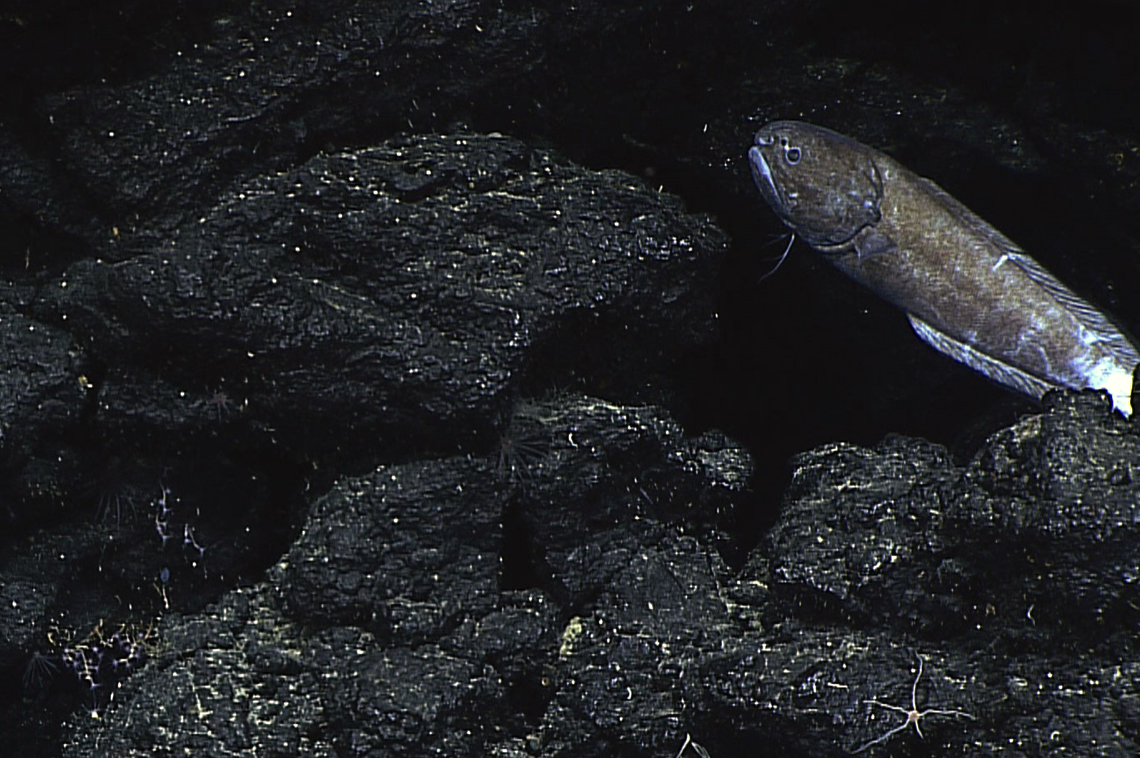

Conservation status
- Least Concern (IUCN 3.1)

Scientific classification
- Kingdom: Animalia
- Phylum: Chordata
- Class: Actinopterygii
- Order: Ophidiiformes
- Family: Ophidiidae
- Subfamily: Neobythitinae
- Genus: Epetriodus
- Species: E. freddyi

Binomial name
- Epetriodus freddyi Cohen & J. G. Nielsen, 1978

= Needletooth cusk =

Species of fish

The needletooth cusk (Epetriodus freddyi) is a species of cusk-eel found in the Indian and the western Pacific Ocean where it occurs at depths of 1,000 to 1,750 metres (3,280 to 5,740 ft). This species grows to a length of 21.5 centimetres (8.5 in) SL. It is the only known species of its genus The generic name is a compound of the Greek epetrion meaning "needle" and odous meaning "tooth", while the specific name honours the English ichthyologist Norman Bertram "Freddy" Marshall (1915-1996) who worked on deep sea fishes as the British Museum (Natural History).
