= Apagesoma =

Scientific classification
- Domain: Eukaryota
- Kingdom: Animalia
- Phylum: Chordata
- Class: Actinopterygii
- Order: Ophidiiformes
- Family: Ophidiidae
- Subfamily: Neobythitinae
- Genus: Apagesoma; H. J. Carter, 1983

Type species
- Apagesoma edentatum Carter, 1983

Genus of fishes

Apagesoma is a genus of cusk-eel found in deep oceanic waters.

== Species ==
There are currently three recognized species in this genus:

- Apagesoma australis J. G. Nielsen, N. J. King & Møller, 2008
- Apagesoma delosommatus (Hureau, Staiger & J. G. Nielsen, 1979)
- Apagesoma edentatum H. J. Carter, 1983
