= Eretmichthys =

Conservation status
- Least Concern (IUCN 3.1)

Scientific classification
- Kingdom: Animalia
- Phylum: Chordata
- Class: Actinopterygii
- Order: Ophidiiformes
- Family: Ophidiidae
- Subfamily: Neobythitinae
- Genus: Eretmichthys
- Species: E. pinnatus

Binomial name
- Eretmichthys pinnatus Garman, 1899

Species of fish

Eretmichthys pinnatus is a species of cusk-eel found in the ocean depths from 1,355 to 2,820 metres (4,446 to 9,252 ft) in the Indo-Pacific from Sulawesi and Japan to western coast of Colombia. This species grows to a length of 41 centimetres (16 in) SL. It is the only known member of its genus.

E. pinnatus is also found on the coast of Brazil.
