= Leptobrotula =

Conservation status
- Data Deficient (IUCN 3.1)

Scientific classification
- Kingdom: Animalia
- Phylum: Chordata
- Class: Actinopterygii
- Division: Teleostei
- Order: Ophidiiformes
- Family: Ophidiidae
- Subfamily: Neobythitinae
- Genus: Leptobrotula
- Species: L. breviventralis

Binomial name
- Leptobrotula breviventralis J. G. Nielsen, 1986

Species of fish

Leptobrotula breviventralis is a species of cusk-eel found in the Indian Ocean off the coast of Africa and in the Pacific Ocean around the Hawaiian Islands. It is found at depths of from 220 to 780 metres (720 to 2,560 ft). This species grows to a length of 32 centimetres (13 in) SL. It is the only known member of its genus.
