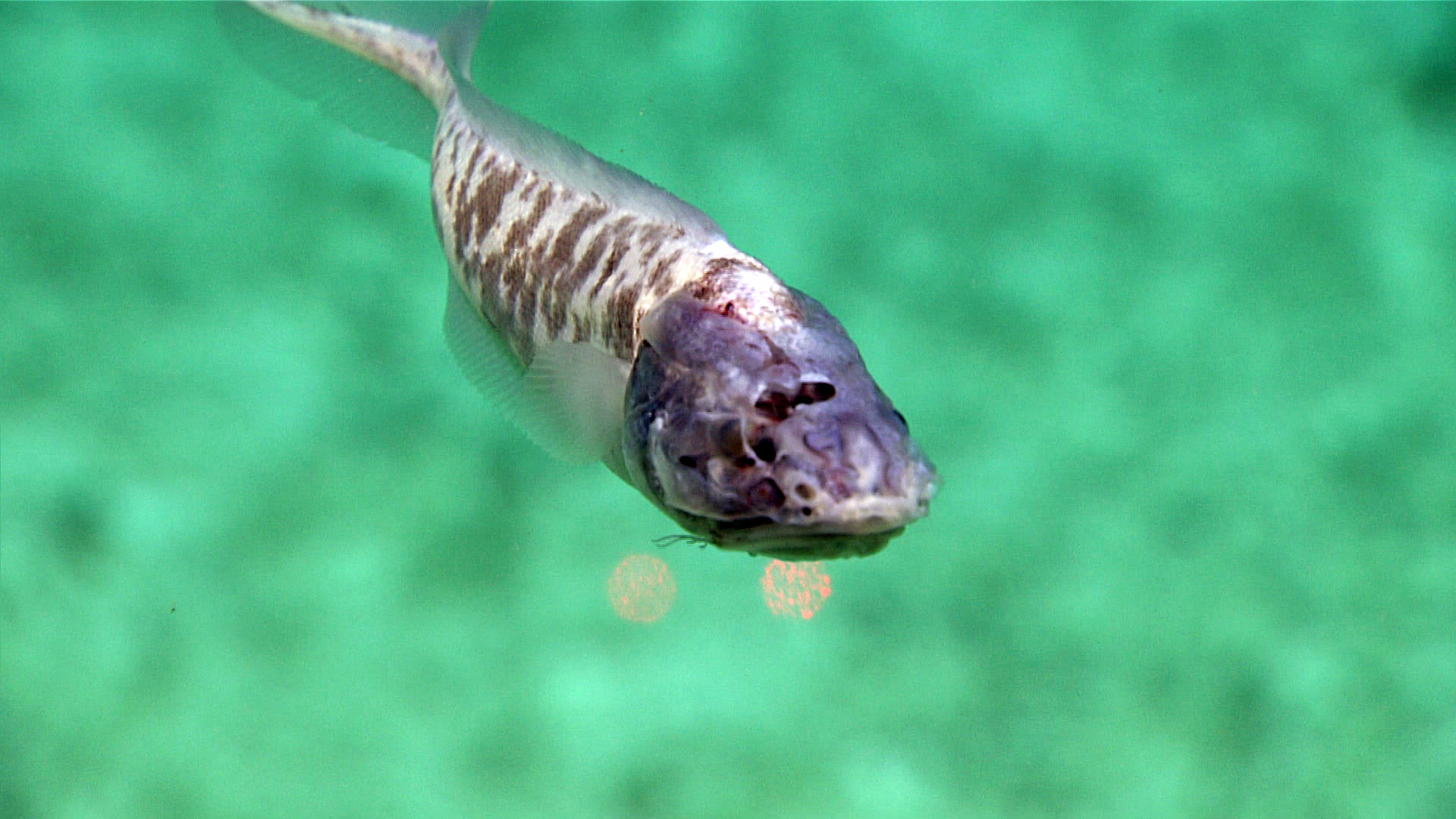

Scientific classification
- Kingdom: Animalia
- Phylum: Chordata
- Class: Actinopterygii
- Order: Ophidiiformes
- Family: Ophidiidae
- Subfamily: Neobythitinae
- Genus: Leucicorus; Garman, 1899

Type species
- Leucicorus lusciosus Garman 1899

= Leucicorus =

Genus of fishes

Leucicorus is a small genus of cusk-eels containing two deep oceanic species: Leucicorus atlanticus Neilsen, 1975 in the west Atlantic and Leucicorus lusciosus Garman, 1899 in the east Pacific.
