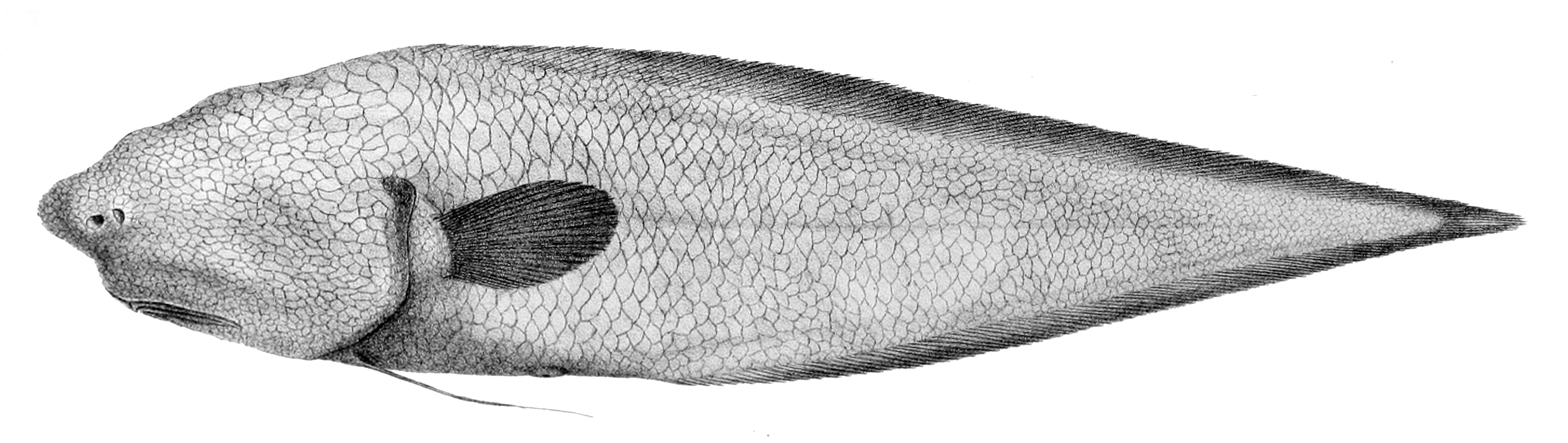

Conservation status
- Least Concern (IUCN 3.1)

Scientific classification
- Kingdom: Animalia
- Phylum: Chordata
- Class: Actinopterygii
- Division: Teleostei
- Order: Ophidiiformes
- Family: Ophidiidae
- Subfamily: Neobythitinae
- Genus: Typhlonus; Günther, 1878
- Species: T. nasus

Binomial name
- Typhlonus nasus Günther, 1878

= Faceless cusk =

Species of fish

The faceless cusk (Typhlonus nasus) is a species of cusk-eel. It is the only species of the monotypic genus Typhlonus. It is found in the Indian and Pacific Oceans at depths from about 3,935 to 5,100 m (12,910 to 16,732 ft). This species grows to 46.5 cm (18.3 in) in standard length.

The fish is named after its appearance due to having an extremely reduced "face". The mouth is located on the underside of the head. The sides of the head do not display any visible eyes. However, Typhlonus nasus does possess eyes, which can be seen deep beneath the skin in small-sized specimens. It also possess two pairs of large nostrils towards the front of the head above the mouth. The species has discernible gill covers on each side of the head and large deciduous scales. It also has reduced dorsal and anal fins which are dark in colors and are fused at the end, as a replacement for a lacking caudal fin. The fins of this fish are black in color, with a very pale body.

== Bibliography ==
- Earl, Jennifer (May 31, 2017). ""Faceless" fish discovered during deep sea expedition off Australian coast". CBS News.
- Daley, Jason (June 1, 2017). ""Faceless" Fish Found off the Coast of Australia". Smithsonian.
