= Ampheristus =

Ampheristus Temporal range: Maastrichtian–Early Oligocene

Scientific classification
- Kingdom: Animalia
- Phylum: Chordata
- Class: Actinopterygii
- Order: Ophidiiformes
- Family: Ophidiidae
- Genus: †Ampheristus; König, 1825

Type species
- †Ampheristus toliapicus König, 1825

Species
- See text

Extinct genus of fishes

Ampheristus is an extinct genus of prehistoric marine ray-finned fish. It was a basal or stem member of the family Ophidiidae, which contains modern cusk-eels. Fossils are known from worldwide (the United States, Europe, India, and New Zealand) from the Late Cretaceous to the late Paleogene (Maastrichtian to Oligocene), making it a rather successful survivor of the Cretaceous-Paleogene extinction event.

It is one of the oldest known members of the order Ophidiiformes alongside Pastorius from the Maastrichtian of Italy. Only the type species, A. toliapicus from the London Clay, is known from body fossils; the rest are known only by the genus's distinctive otoliths.

== Species ==
The following species are known:

- A. americanus Schwarzhans & Stringer, 2020 (Maastrichtian of Texas and Maryland, Danian of Arkansas)
- A. bavaricus (Koken, 1891) (Maastrichtian of Germany)
- A. bhavnagarensis Singh, Patel & Rana, 2017 (Eocene of India)
- A. brevicauda Schwarzhans, 2010 (Maastrichtian of Germany)
- A. brevicaudatus Lin, Steurbaut & Nolf, 2024 (Eocene of Alabama, Virginia and Maryland)
- A. neobavaricus Schwarzhans, 2012 (Paleocene of Germany)
- A. pentlandensis Schwarzhans, 2019 (Eocene of New Zealand)
- A. sinuocaudatus Schwarzhans, 1980 (Eocene of New Zealand)
- A. sztrakosi Nolf & Steurbaut, 2004 (Oligocene of Italy)
- A. toliapicus König, 1825 (Eocene of the United Kingdom) (type species)
- A. traunensis Schwarzhans, 2010 (Maastrichtian of Germany)

The species A. lerichei, known by a body fossil from the Eocene of Belgium and otoliths from the same region, is alternately placed in Ampheristus or Hoplobrotula.
