= Spottobrotula =

Scientific classification
- Kingdom: Animalia
- Phylum: Chordata
- Class: Actinopterygii
- Order: Ophidiiformes
- Family: Ophidiidae
- Subfamily: Neobythitinae
- Genus: Spottobrotula; Cohen & J. G. Nielsen, 1978

Type species
- Spottobrotula mahodadi Cohen & Nielsen, 1978

Genus of fishes

Spottobrotula is a genus of cusk-eels.

== Species ==
There are currently 3 recognized species in this genus:

- Spottobrotula mahodadi Cohen & J. G. Nielsen, 1978
- Spottobrotula mossambica J. G. Nielsen, Schwarzhans & Uiblein, 2014
- Spottobrotula persica J. G. Nielsen, Schwarzhans & Uiblein, 2014
