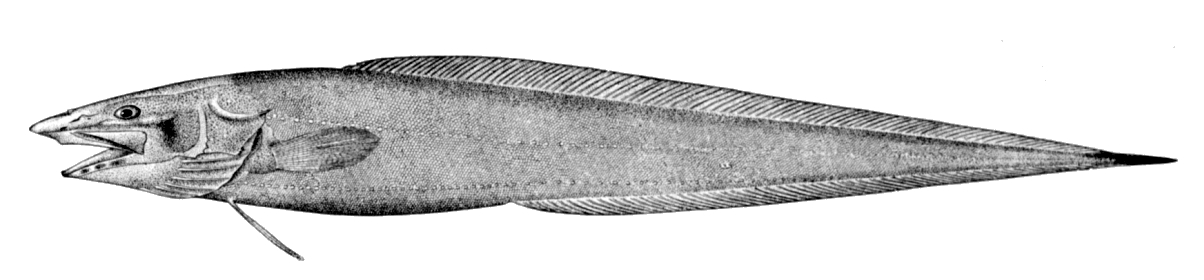
- P. microphthalmus

Scientific classification
- Kingdom: Animalia
- Phylum: Chordata
- Class: Actinopterygii
- Order: Ophidiiformes
- Family: Ophidiidae
- Subfamily: Neobythitinae
- Genus: Penopus; Goode & Bean, 1896

Type species
- Penopus macdonaldi a synonym of P. micropthalmus Goode & Bean, 1896

= Penopus =

Genus of fishes

Penopus is a genus of cusk-eels.

== Species ==
There are currently two recognized species in this genus:

- Penopus japonicus J. G. Nielsen & Ohashi, 2011
- Penopus microphthalmus (Vaillant, 1888)
