= Philippine Expedition of the USS Albatross =

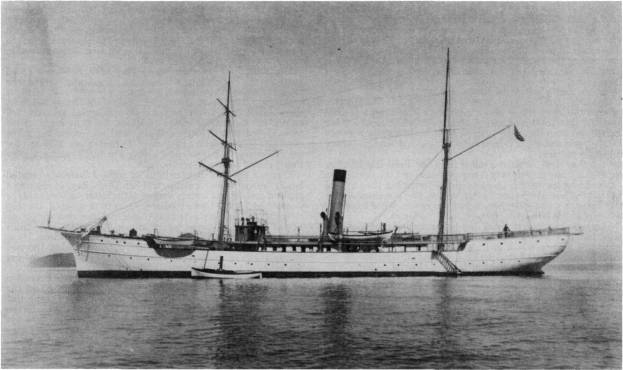
The USS Albatross

The Philippine expedition was a two and a half year scientific expedition of the USS Albatross to the Philippine Islands. It was the longest voyage of that vessel and, after the United States Exploring Expedition, was the second longest maritime research expedition undertaken by the United States. It spanned from 1907 to 1910, and was directed by Hugh McCormick Smith, a ichthyologist and at the time, Deputy Commissioner of the U. S. Bureau of Fisheries. The expedition collected approximately 100,000 fish specimens, although the exact number is not known.

== Background information ==
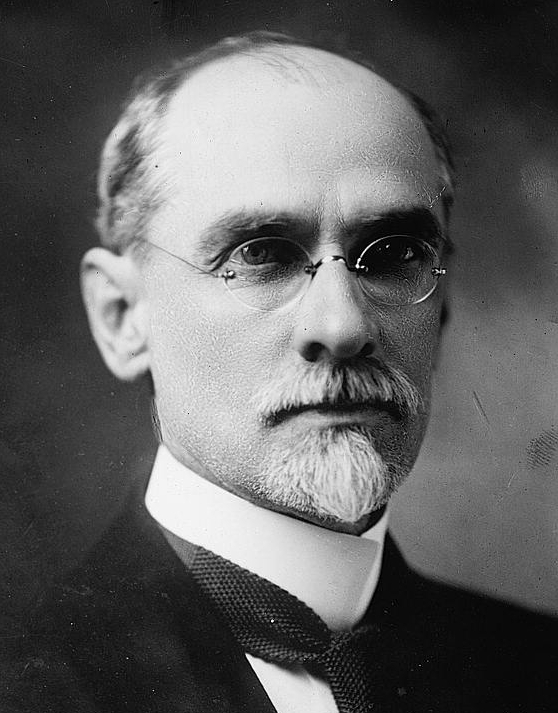
American ichthyologist Hugh McCormick Smith (1865-1941)

Civilian Staff/ Lead Members
Name	Position
Hugh M. Smith	Deputy Commissioner of Fisheries, Director of the Expedition and Ichthyologist
Frederick M. Chamberlain	Resident Naturalist
Mr. Lewis Radcliffe	General Assistant and Naturalist
H. C. Fassett	Fishery Expert
Paul Bartsch	Zoologist, representing the U. S. National Museum
Clarence M. Wells	Assistant and Clerk

Near the end of the 19th century, the Spanish empire was collapsing losing almost all of its land and power. This left the empire vulnerable, influencing other great powers, including Germany, Japan, and US, to fight for these regions once owned by Spain. In January 1898, President William McKinley of the United States sent a battleship, called Maine, to Havana, Cuba, to warn Germany, Cuba, and Spain of their power in hopes to prevent a stronger European power from replacing Spain. The Maine was blown apart by the Spanish. In response, the United States and Spain declared war with each other resulting in the Spanish–American War of 1898. The United States was much more successful and forced Spain into selling them the Philippines. This did not please the Philippines. Filipinos were furious because they did not want a new tyrant. The United States went to war with the Philippines in the year 1899 and lasted for three and a half years. Several casualties were made with 7,000 American fatalities, 16,000–20,000 Filipino casualties, and 500,000 civilian casualties. Once the Philippines were obtained, their first order of business was to have an expedition that studied and surveyed the newly owned land.

== Expedition's route ==
The team consisted of 70 crewman and was led by Dr. Hugh McCormick Smith. Other members included Mr. Frederick M. Chamberlain, Mr. Lewis Radcliffe, Mr. H.C. Fassett, Dr. Paul Bartsch, and Mr. Clarence M. Wells.

=== First route ===
The Albatross left San Francisco, California on October 16, 1907, and traveled to Honolulu, Hawaii. They stayed in Hawaii for 10 days and then traveled to Midway Island over the course of 2 days. After making a stop at Midway Island, they sailed to the Philippines and arrived at Manila on November 28, 1907. Their first days in the Philippines were limited to completing short excursions due to the lack of equipment from the United States. The crew waited until they received the tools they needed and officially started their first cruise on February 1, 1908. The Albatross’s first extensive cruise began in Manila and traveled south through Philippine seas to south coast of Mindanao, Sulu Archipelago, to South Reed, then to Sandakan, Borneo.

=== Second cruise ===
This cruise was focused in the central region of the Philippines and lasted from February 2 to March 10, 1908. The crew observed the islands: Panay, Negros, Cebu, Bohol, Leyte, Samar, Masbate, and Marinduque. Hugh M. Smith left the crew in April 1908 and was replaced by Roy Chapman Andrews to lead the Albatross. Lewis Radcliffe and Paul Bartsch also left shortly after Smith's departure.

=== Third cruise ===
From May 4 to June 9, 1908, the Albatross completed a third cruise that worked in the same direction as the second cruise, but extended coverage to the southern island of Mindanao.

=== Other cruises ===
Several smaller cruises took place after the three main cruises. The crew devoted its time to the exploration of the China Sea from July to December 1908. They ventured the coast of southern Luzon and western rim of the China Sea from Hong Kong to Formosa. From December 1908 to January 1909, the crew observed the western and southern part of Palawan. From February to April 1909, dredgings were made along the southern coast of Luzon. In May 1909, another small cruise focused on the small islands along the southeastern coast of Luzon. From July to September 1909, the crew observed the waters of Samar, the islands, Cebu, Bohol, Nefros, Siquijor, and Mindanao. The last cruise devoted time to explore the Dutch East Indies.

=== Post-expedition ===
The crew finally ended their expedition on January 21, 1910. Paul Bartsch, zoologist and representative of the U.S. National Museum, claims that the crew observed over 400,000 specimens and sent them to the Bureau of Fisheries. The Bureau of Fisheries kept the collection in storage provided by the Smithsonian Institution for further study. Only 100,000 of those specimens are in record. After the expedition, Dr. Smith served the U.S. Bureau of Fisheries for another 13 years and Paul Bartsch returned to his job at the Smithsonian.

== Collection process ==
Equipment used during expedition:

- 12-foot Agassiz beam trawl
- Reversible nets
- Mud bags (used to collect bottom sediment)
- 12-foot Tanner beam trawl
- 9-foot Albatross-Blake beam trawl
- 6-foot and 9-foot Johnson oyster dredges
- 6-foot McCormick trawl
- 2-foot Blake trawl (used for shallow water)

One method used during the expedition was locating desirable samples of fish through a glass box. The crew then dropped small charges of dynamite into the waters where there was coral growth. Once the dead fishes floated up towards the surface of the water, they were then collected using spears. Another method was the use of grill nets, hand lines, and traps. Specimens were also purchased from local fisherman and markets. Sometimes, the crew split up and collected specimens on shore by hand. After collecting samples, the specimens needed to be prepared and preserved in ethyl alcohol. Large specimens were injected by the alcohol and were individually tagged with linen tags or numbered metal. The crew also included sketch artists that drew each specimen in detail, since colored photography did not exist at the time.

== Discoveries made ==
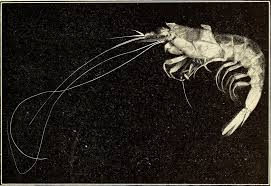
A marine isopod collected in the Philippines expedition 1907-08

This list is pulled from the works of Fenner Chace and only includes the name of the groups. There are several species in each group listed.

=== Family Alpheidae ===
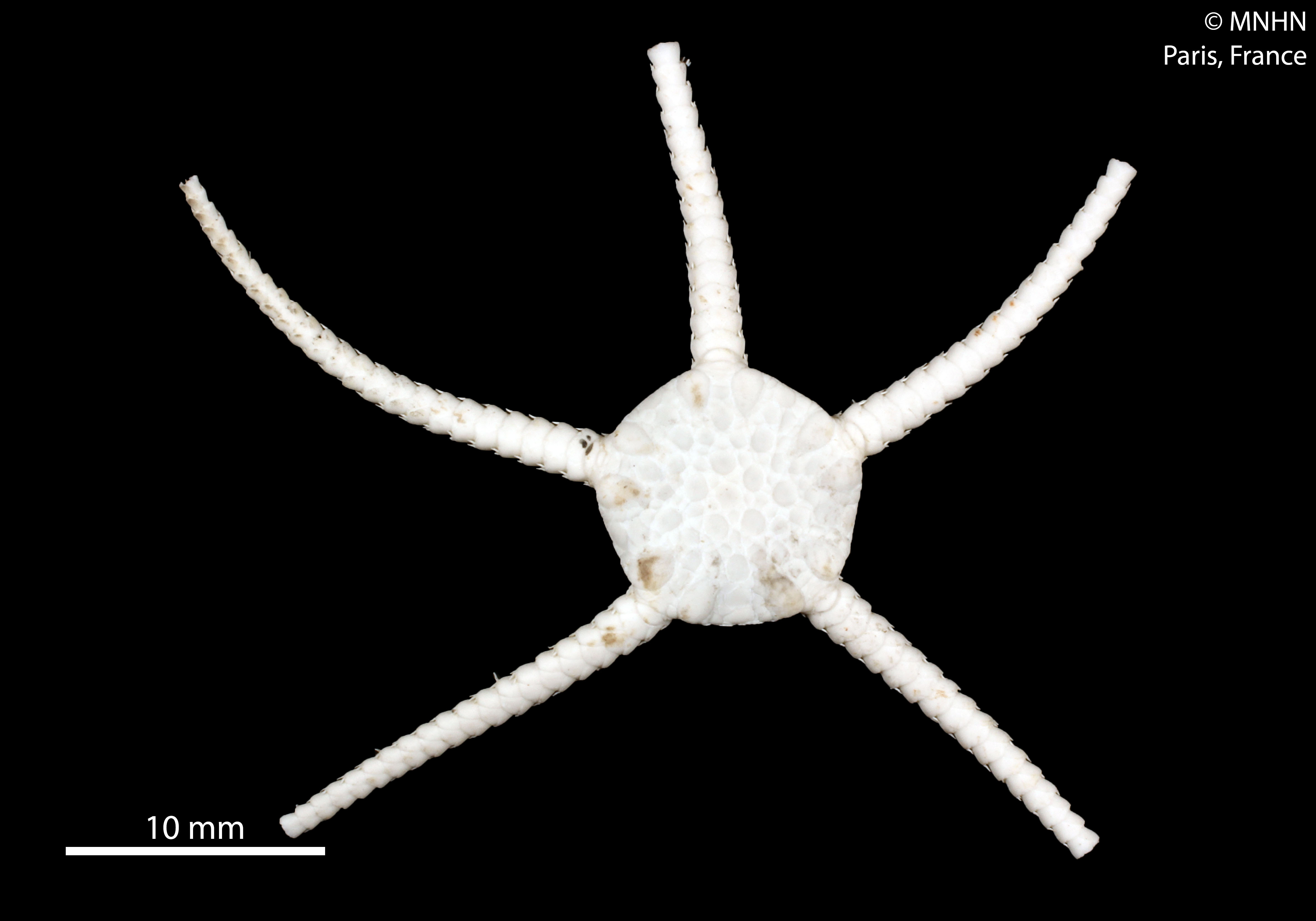
A Ophiozonella subtilis collected in the Philippines expedition 1907-1910

- Alpheopsis group
- Alpheus group
- Aretopsis group
- Athanas group
- Automate group
- Batella group
- Betaeopsis group
- Metalpheus group
- Nennalpheus group
- Neoalpheopsis group
- Prionalpheus group
- Racilius
- Salmoneus
- Synalpheus
- Vexillipar
