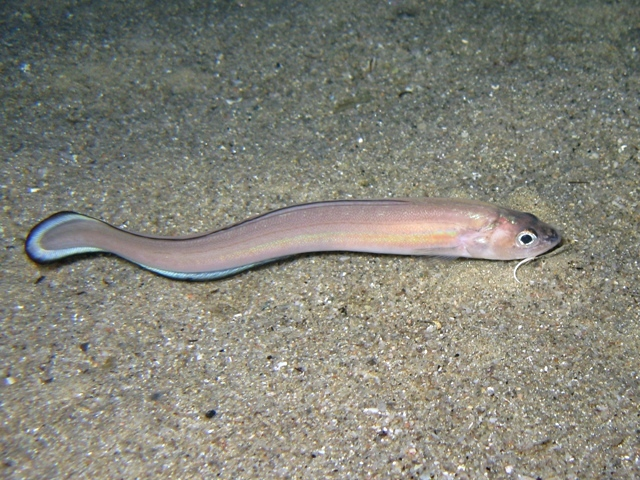
- Ophidion barbatum
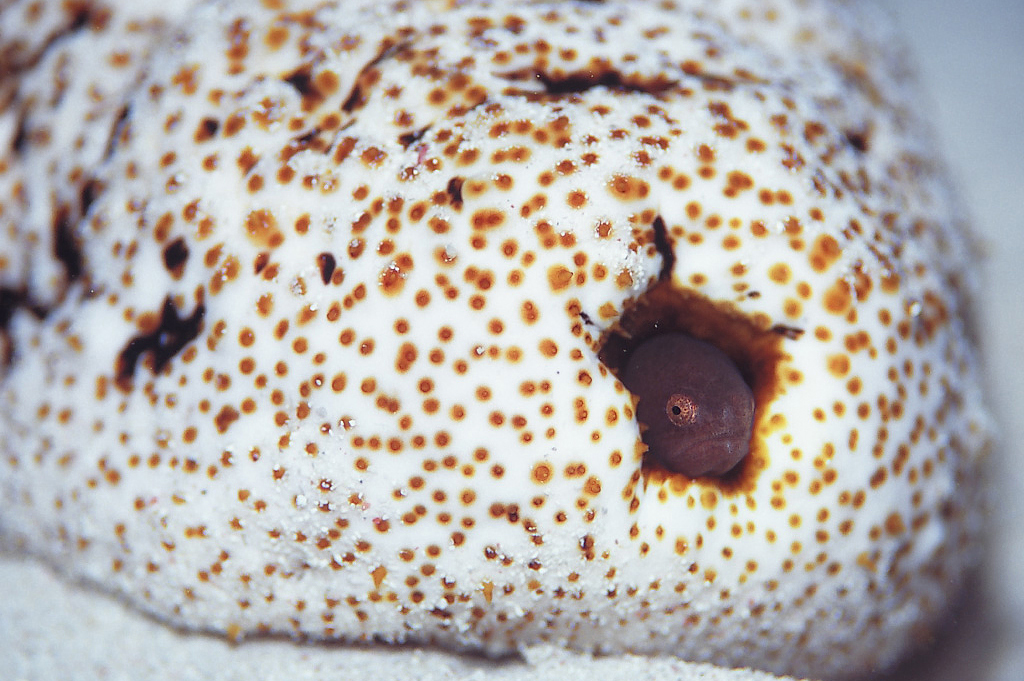
- Encheliophis boraborensis inside of a sea cucumber

Scientific classification
- Kingdom: Animalia
- Phylum: Chordata
- Class: Actinopterygii
- Order: Ophidiiformes
- Suborder: Ophidioidei; Garman, 1899

= Ophidioidei =

Ophidioidei Temporal range: Maastrichtian to present

Suborder of fishes

Ophidioidei is one of two suborders in the order Ophidiiformes, the cusk eels, viviparous brotulas and pearlfishes. The main distinction from the suborder Bythitoidei is that the Ophidioidei are oviparous, other features include having a caudal fin which is joined to both the anal fin and the dorsal fin forming an even combined fin which tapers to a point, a lack of an external intromittent organ in males and the anterior nostril is placed high above the mouth.

== Families ==
The following families are classified in the suborder Ophidioidei:

- Family Acanthonidae Wong & Chen, 2024 (deepsea cusk-eels)
- Family Brotulidae Swainson, 1838 (bearded cusk-eels)
- Family Ophidiidae Rafinesque, 1810 (cusk-eels)
- Family Carapidae Poey, 1867 (pearlfishes)
