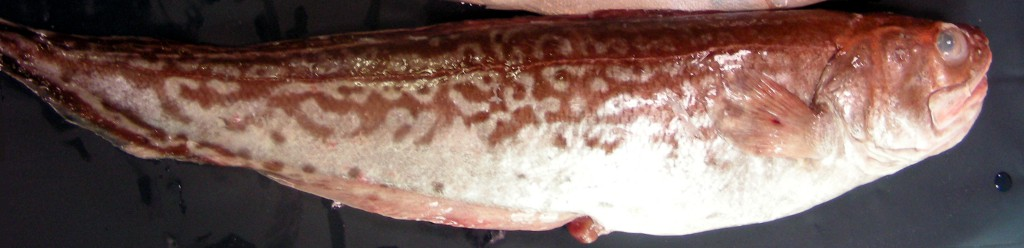
- Armored Cusk (H. armata)

Scientific classification
- Kingdom: Animalia
- Phylum: Chordata
- Class: Actinopterygii
- Division: Teleostei
- Order: Ophidiiformes
- Family: Ophidiidae
- Subfamily: Neobythitinae
- Genus: Hoplobrotula; Gill, 1863

Type species
- Brotula armata Temminck & Schlegel, 1846

= Hoplobrotula =

Genus of fishes

Hoplobrotula is a genus of cusk-eels.

== Species ==
There are currently three recognized species in this genus:

- Hoplobrotula armata (Temminck & Schlegel, 1846) (Armored cusk)
- Hoplobrotula badia Machida, 1990
- Hoplobrotula gnathopus (Regan, 1921) (False kinglip)
