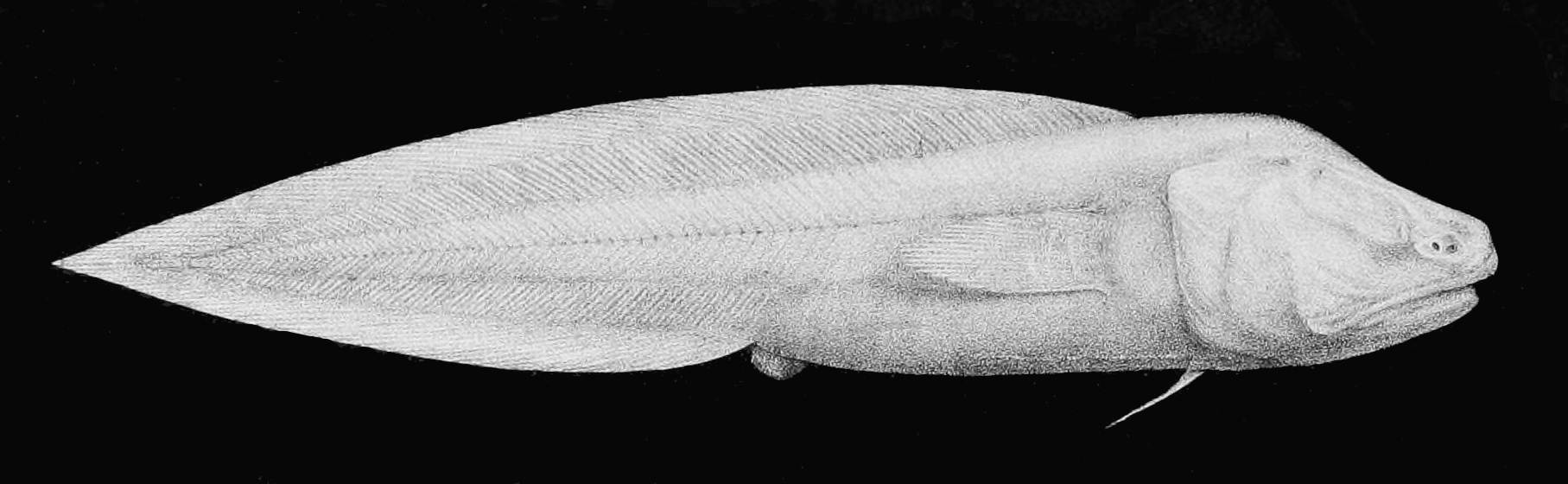
- Aphyonus gelatinosus

Scientific classification
- Domain: Eukaryota
- Kingdom: Animalia
- Phylum: Chordata
- Class: Actinopterygii
- Order: Ophidiiformes
- Suborder: Bythitoidei

= Bythitoidei =

Suborder of fishes

Bythitoidei is a suborder of the order Ophidiiformes, the cusk eels. They are distinguished from the other Ophidiform suborder, the Ophidioidei, by being largely viviparous.

== Families ==
The following families make up the suborder Bythitoidei:

- Family Bythitidae Gill, 1861 — viviparous brotulas
- Family Aphyonidae Jordan & Evermann, 1898 —aphyonids, blind cusk-eel
- Family Parabrotulidae Nielsen, 1968 — false brotulas
