= Lamprogrammus shcherbachevi =

Conservation status
- Data Deficient (IUCN 3.1)

Scientific classification
- Kingdom: Animalia
- Phylum: Chordata
- Class: Actinopterygii
- Order: Ophidiiformes
- Family: Ophidiidae
- Genus: Lamprogrammus
- Species: L. shcherbachevi

Binomial name
- Lamprogrammus shcherbachevi Cohen & Rohr, 1993

Species of Actinopterygii

Lamprogrammus shcherbachevi, the scaleline cusk, is a species of marine ray-finned fish in the family Ophidiidae.

== Description ==
Attaining a maximum length of 193 cm (76 in) in males, this species is the largest among the cusk-eels. This species is characterized by its elongate body, distinctive series of spines on the preopercle and opercle, and lack of anterior dorsal fin spines.

== Etymology ==
The fish is named in honor of Yuri Nikolayevich Shcherbachev of the Institute of Oceanology, in the Academy of Sciences of the USSR, who was a colleague, a shipmate and the “master of deepsea ichthyology”.
