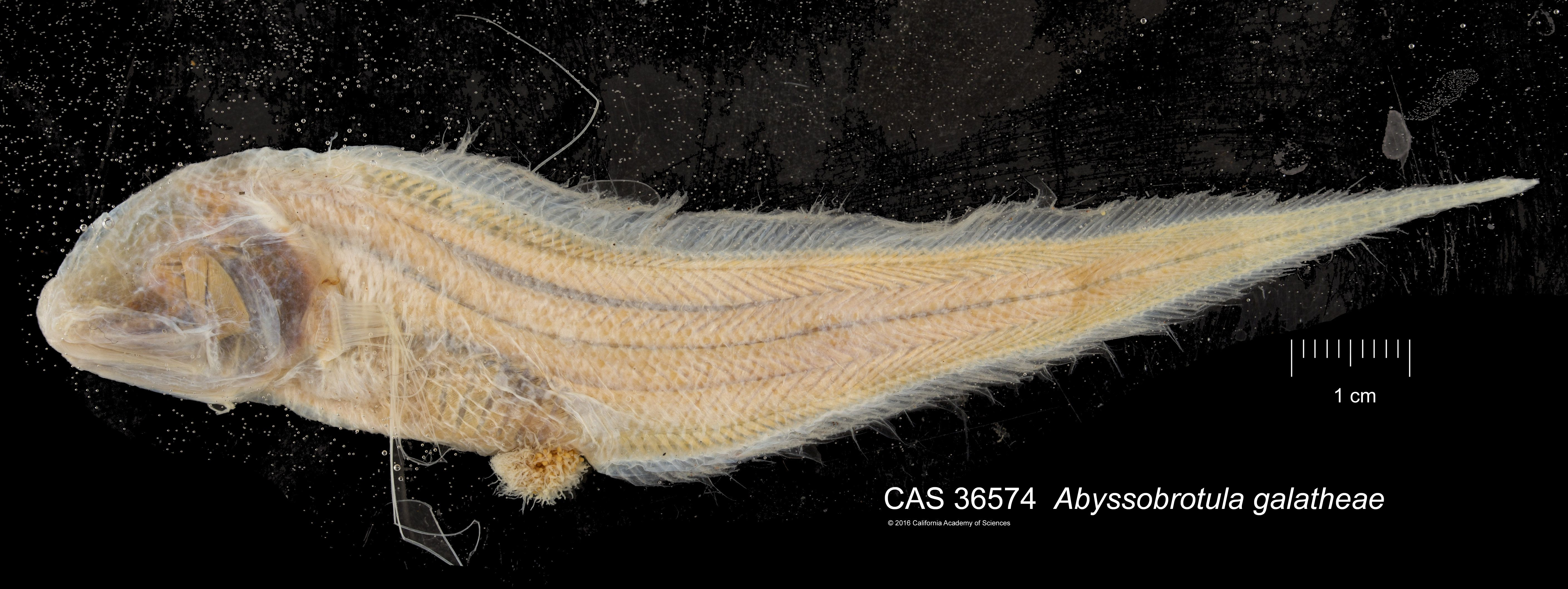

Conservation status
- Least Concern (IUCN 3.1)

Scientific classification
- Kingdom: Animalia
- Phylum: Chordata
- Class: Actinopterygii
- Order: Ophidiiformes
- Family: Ophidiidae
- Genus: Abyssobrotula
- Species: A. galatheae

Binomial name
- Abyssobrotula galatheae J. G. Nielsen, 1977

= Abyssobrotula galatheae =

Species of fish

Abyssobrotula galatheae is a species of cusk eel in the family Ophidiidae. It is the deepest-living fish known; one specimen, trawled from a depth of 8,370 m (27,460 ft) in the Puerto Rico Trench in 1970, holds the record for the deepest fish ever captured. Although generally recognized, some have suggested that the record-breaking individual might have been caught with a non-closing net (a net that is open on the way up and down into the deep) and therefore perhaps caught shallower.

The first examples of this fish were misidentified by Staiger as Bassogigas profundissimus, before being described as a new species by Jørgen G. Nielsen in 1977. The species name refers to the research ship HDMS Galathea, which captured the first specimens during the second Galathea expedition.

== Distribution and life history ==
Though uncommon, this species is known from all tropical and subtropical oceans. It occurs in the abyssal and hadal zones below a depth of 3,110 m (10,200 ft). It is bottom-dwelling in nature, although one individual has been captured from the water column in the Gulf of Panama. Its diet consists of polychaete worms and crustaceans, such as isopods and amphipods. Reproduction is oviparous, possibly with pelagic eggs floating in a gelatinous mass as in other members of the family.

== Description ==
This species grows to 16.5 cm (6.5 in) standard length. It has a short head with a downward inflection, a swollen snout and an inferior mouth. The body is soft, with a tapering tail and loose, transparent skin. Both the body and the head are covered with scales. The teeth are small and pointed, arranged in irregular rows; the two median and single pair of basibranchial (on the most ventral gill arch) tooth patches are distinctive for this species. The eyes are tiny, deep-set, and hidden. They are unlikely to be functional, but there is a well-developed system of sensory pores on its head. The lateral line is visible only on the frontmost part of the body and lacks developed pores.

Externally, A. galatheae can be distinguished from other deep-sea ophidioids by its long pectoral fins, which contain only 10–11 fin rays each, and its flat, weakly developed opercular spine. The long dorsal and anal fins contain 97–116 and 76–96 rays respectively. The pelvic fins and caudal fin are small and contain 2 and 8 rays respectively. The coloration is yellowish; the branchial cavity is black and the peritoneum dark brown. The skeleton is well-ossified, consistent with a benthic lifestyle; there are 18–21 precaudal vertebrae.

== See also ==
- Holcomycteronus profundissimus, formerly believed to be the deepest-living species of fish
- Pseudoliparis swirei, the species of fish caught at the greatest depth on the seafloor, if the record of Abyssobrotula galatheae is not accepted
