= Louis Roule =

French zoologist

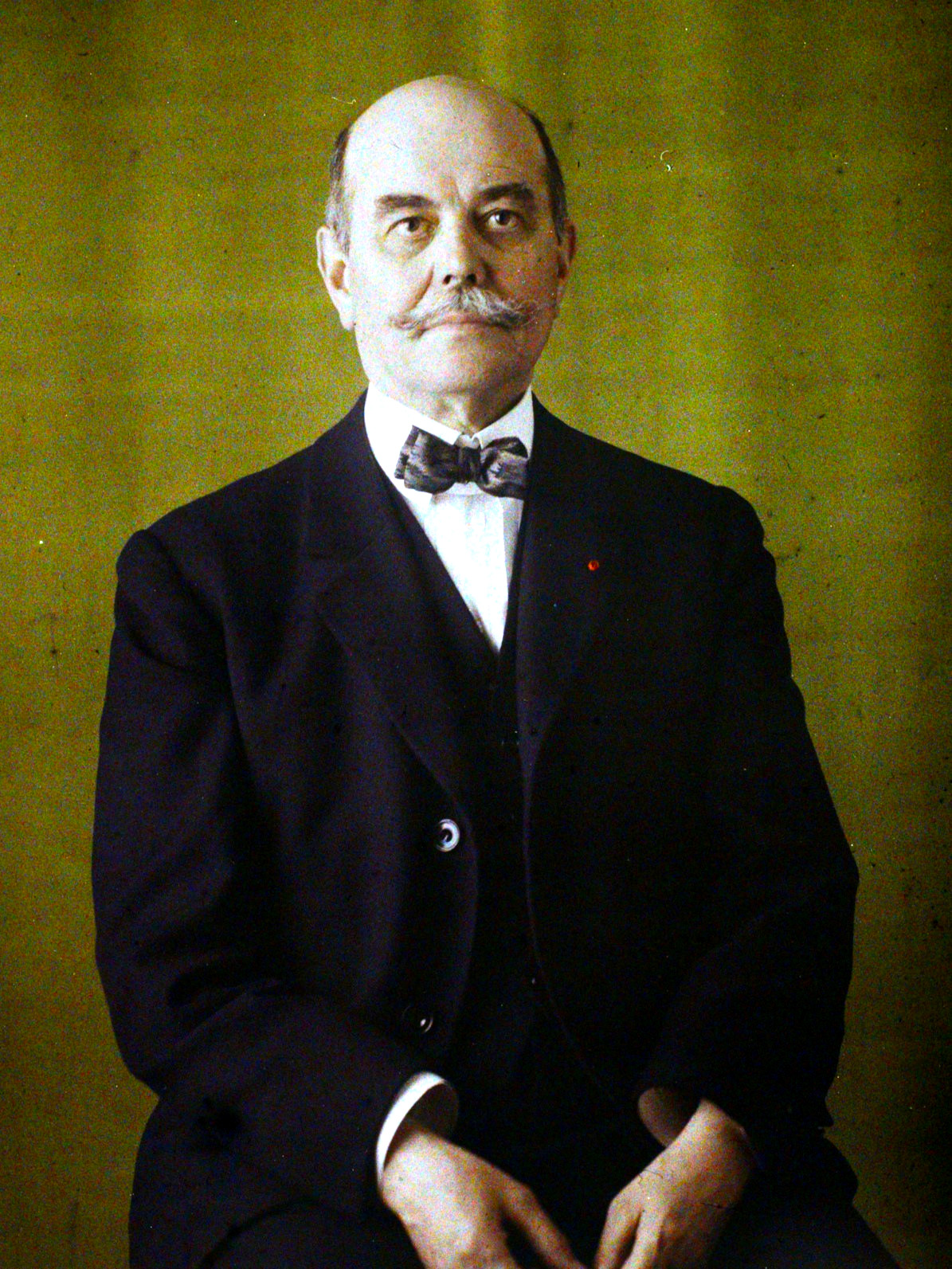
- 1929 Autochrome by Georges Chevalier
- Born: 20 December 1861; Marseille, France
- Died: 30 July 1942 (aged 80); Versailles, France
- Scientific career
- Fields: Embryology; Ichthyology; Zoology
- Institutions: Muséum national d'histoire naturelle

Louis Roule ([lwi ʁul]; 20 December 1861 – 30 July 1942) was a French zoologist born in Marseille.

In 1881 he obtained a degree in natural sciences at Marseille, followed by his doctorate of sciences (1884) at Paris with a thesis on ascidians of coastal Provence. From 1885 he worked as a lecturer at the faculty of sciences in Toulouse, where in 1892 he became a professor. During the previous year (1891), he earned a doctorate in medicine.

In 1910 he succeeded Léon Vaillant (1834–1914) as chair of zoology (reptiles and fish) at the Muséum national d'histoire naturelle in Paris, a position he would hold until 1937. During this time period he was also an instructor at the Institut National Agronomique (from 1925), and director of the laboratory of ichthyology at the École pratique des hautes études (EPHE).

== Works ==
Roule's early research dealt largely with invertebrates. Later his focus turned to ichthyology, of which he had the opportunity to take inventory of large collections of marine specimens. He analyzed collections gathered from Prince Albert I of Monaco, as well as specimens obtained from the Antarctic expeditions of Jean-Baptiste Charcot (1867–1936). Roule was the first scientist to describe Grimaldichthys profundissimus, a fish species found at a depth of over six kilometers.

He had an avid interest in the work of French naturalists of previous generations, publishing books on Buffon, Daubenton, Lamarck and Cuvier. Roule was also the author of well regarded works in the fields of embryology and comparative anatomy.

== Descriptions ==
- See Category:Taxa named by Louis Roule

== Legacy ==
Two species of reptiles are named in his honor:

- Atractus roulei and
- Isopachys roulei.
- A fish genus of Slickheads, Rouleina is named after him.
- A species of Goby Gobius roulei, Roule's goby is named after him.

== Selected writings ==
- Recherches sur les Ascidies simple des cotes de Provence, Phallusiadées, 1884 – Research on simple ascidians of coastal Provence, Phallusia.
- L'embryologie générale, 1893 – General embryology.
- L' anatomie comparée des animaux basée sur l'embryologie, 1898 – Comparative anatomy of animals based on embryology.
- Buffon et la description de la nature, 1924
- Daubenton et l'exploitation de la nature, 1925
- Les poissons et le monde vivant des eaux, 1926
- Lamarck et l'interprétation de la nature, 1927
- Les poissons apodes appartenant au sous-ordre des nemichthydiformes, 1929 – Treatise on Nemichthyidae.
- La structure et la biologie des poissons, 1930 – Structure and biology of fish.
- Fishes, their journeys and migrations, 1933 (translated from the French by Conrad Elphinstone).
- Fishes and their ways of life, 1935 (translated from the French by Conrad Elphinstone).

== See also ==
- List of Chairs of the Muséum national d'histoire naturelle
