= Alfred William Alcock =

British physician, naturalist and carcinologist

Alfred William Alcock CIE FRS
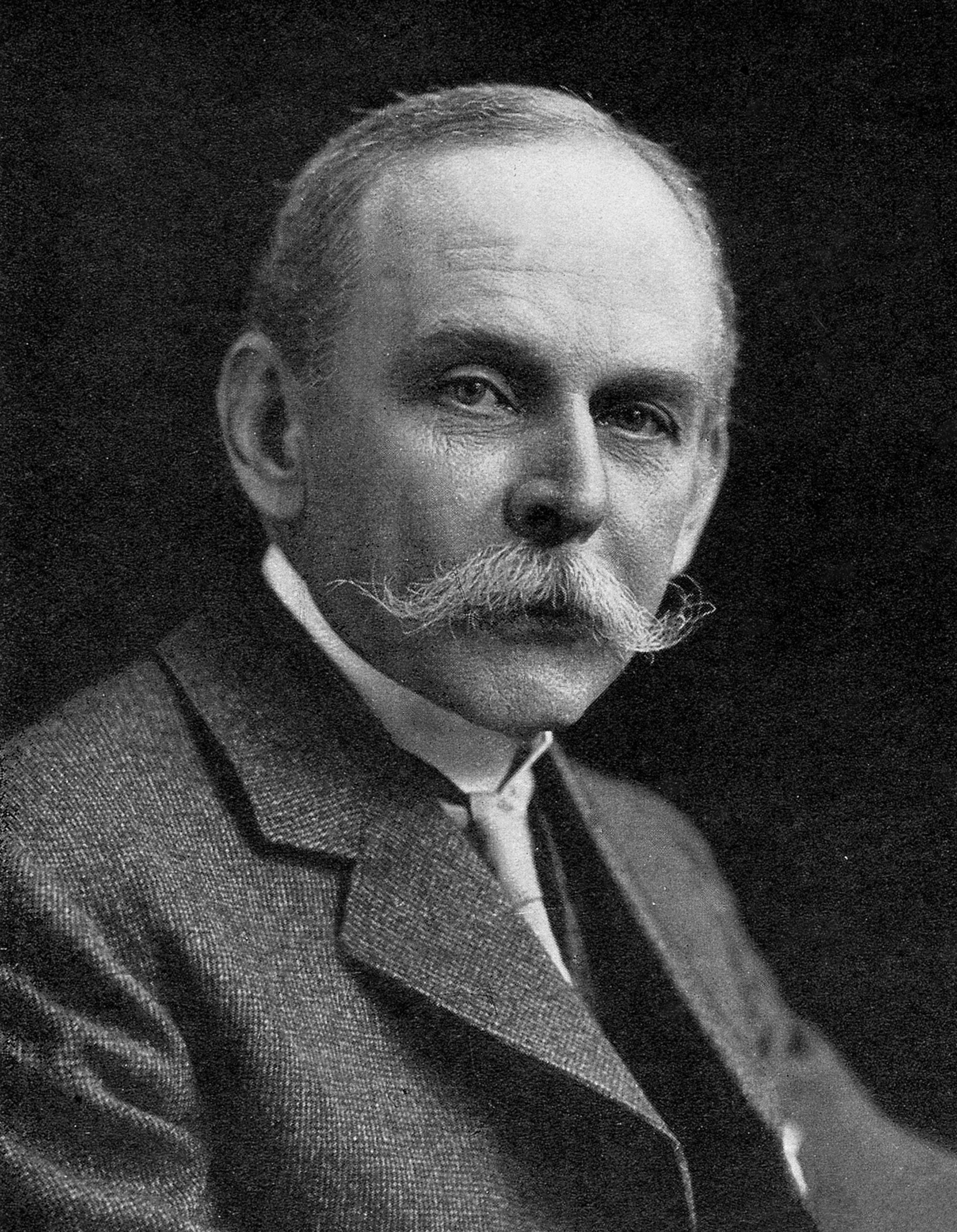
- Born: 23 June 1859; Bombay, India
- Died: 24 March 1933 (aged 73); Belvedere, Kent (now London)
- Education: Blackheath Proprietary School, Westminster School, Aberdeen University
- Known for: Describing a wide range of species
- Spouse: Margaret Forbes Cornwall
- Father: John Alcock
- Awards: Order of the Indian Empire, Barclay Medal of the Asiatic Society of Bengal
- Scientific career
- Fields: Medical entomology, herpetology
- Institutions: Calcutta, Darjeeling, London School of Hygiene & Tropical Medicine

Alfred William Alcock CIE FRS (23 June 1859 – 24 March 1933) was a British physician, naturalist, and carcinologist.

== Early life and education ==
Alcock was the son of a sea-captain, John Alcock in Bombay, India who retired to live in Blackheath. His mother was a daughter of Christopher Puddicombe, the only son of a Devon squire.

Alcock studied at Mill Hill School, at Blackheath Proprietary School and at Westminster School. In 1876 his father faced financial losses and he was taken out of school and sent to India in the Wynaad district. Here he was taken care of by relatives engaged in coffee-planting. As a boy of 17 he spent time in the jungles of Malabar.

== Career ==
Coffee-planting in Wynaad declined and Alcock obtained a post at a commission agent's office in Calcutta. This office closed soon, and he worked from 1878 to 1880 in Purulia as an agent recruiting unskilled labourers for the Assam tea gardens. While here an acquaintance, Duncan Cameron, left him a Macmillan book by Michael Foster Physiology Primer. This book, he wrote in his autobiographical notes, "That little book was to me what the light from heaven was to St. Paul. It set my face towards natural science." He regretted that he never got to know Michael Foster, "but throughout the rest of my life I have thought of him with the gratitude of a disciple, for his Primer and for his Textbook of Physiology which I got as soon as I had mastered his Primer. Its philosophical spirit impressed me very deeply."

Another friend he made in Purulia was Lieut.-Col. J. J. Wood, then deputy sanitary commissioner there. Wood invited him to the study of botany, natural history and chemistry. During this time Alcock even dug graves to study the bodies of humans. He studied bones using Holden's Osteology – "Thence I crept on by means of a Nicholson's ' Manual of Zoology ' to the Descent of Man and the ' Origin of Species.' I was now resolved to be a doctor, but I could not think how it was to come to pass."

In 1880 he took up a post as assistant master in a European boys school at Darjeeling. Here Colonel Wood left his son under the tutelage of Alcock. In 1881 Alcock's elder sister moved to India as her husband was a distinguished officer in the Indian Civil Service. Alcock was then able to sail home to begin his medical training. He found Aberdeen University economical and entered Marischal College in October, 1881. In the first year he took the medal in Henry Alleyne Nicholson's class of Natural History. Even when "unqualified" he served as house surgeon in the Aberdeen Royal Infirmary. In 1885 he graduated M.B., C.M., "with honourable distinction" and joined the Indian Medical Service.

Alcock sailed to India in 1886 and served in the north-west frontier with Sikh regiment and Punjab regiments. In Baluchistan he dealt with his first case of a fatal snake bite from an Echis carinatus. In 1888 he became Surgeon-Naturalist to the Indian Marine Survey on the survey ship Investigator. Here he studied marine zoology and he published many papers along with the zoologist James Wood-Mason and others. He wrote about these years in A Naturalist in Indian Seas (1902) which is considered a classic in natural history travel.

In 1892 Alcock resigned (having attained the rank of major) and became Deputy Sanitary Commissioner for Eastern Bengal. In 1893 Wood-Mason went home and Alcock agreed to act for him during his absence. Wood-Mason died on his way to England and Alcock was appointed as the superintendent of the Indian Museum. In 1895–96 he was on the Pamis Boundary Commission and wrote the Natural History results of this expedition. At the Indian Museum, Alcock worked on improving the public galleries of Reptiles, Fishes and Invertebrates. Sir George King, who was the chairman of the trustees, supported him; however, after his retirement, Alcock was given little support. Lord Curzon decided to exhibit the collections of the Indian Museum as a memorial to Queen Victoria in 1903 and Alcock was ordered to "vacate the gallery of Fishes at a moment's notice." Alcock protested to the trustees that "it would be disgraceful to dismantle a gallery of Invertebrates which included an exhibit of the recent mosquito-malaria discoveries, at a moment when those discoveries seemed at last to have driven into the thickest British skull the great truth that the study of zoology was of some use to mankind." The gallery was spared but the library was to be cleared. These experiences caused Alcock to quit and he returned home in 1906 writing to the Government "telling him what an impossible post the Superintendentship of the Museum was and begging him to get it improved for the sake of the Science of Zoology and of my successors." In the letter Alcock wrote that Zoology was "a branch of pure science pregnant with human interest", important to the state "in matters of education, in matters agricultural and veterinary, and in the vital matter of public health." He suggested the establishment of "an Indian Zoological Survey" with a museum and laboratory administered by zoologists along the lines of the Geological and Botanical Surveys.

He was asked to withdraw his resignation and rejoin with promises of reform at the Indian Museum, however he wrote that "I stuck to my resolve that if the position at the Indian Museum was to be improved by my efforts no cynical potentate at Simla should ever say that I had got it altered for my own benefit."

Back in London he made acquaintance with Sir Patrick Manson, who he had known since student days. He began to work on tropical medicine at the School of Tropical Medicine at the Albert Dock Seamen's Hospital, Albert Dock.

Alcock was elected a fellow of the Royal Society in 1901. He was made a Companion of the Order of the Indian Empire (CIE) in the 1903 Durbar Honours, and received the Barclay Medal from the Asiatic Society of Bengal in 1907.

In 1897 he married Margaret Forbes Cornwall, of Aberdeen.

== Achievements ==
Alcock was primarily a systematist, describing a wide range of species. He worked on aspects of biology and physiology of fishes, their distributions, evolution and behaviour. Some of his works were published in "Zoological Gleanings from the R.I.M.S. ' Investigator,' " published in " Scientific Memoirs by Medical Officers of the Army of India," Part XII, Simla, 1901.

He worked on Fishes, Decapod Crustacea, and Deep Sea Madreporarian Corals. He published in the Journal of the Asiatic Society of Bengal, the Annals and Magazine of Natural History as well as catalogues published by the Indian Museum. His "Illustrations of the Zoology of the R.I.M.S. ' Investigator,' ", a series with illustrations by Indian artists (mainly A. C. Chowdhary and S. C. Mondul) has been considered as exceptional in beauty and accuracy.

Alcock's school education of classics and literature led him to write in a Victorian literary style. He specialized in medical entomology, wrote a textbook "Entomology for Medical Officers " (1st edition 1911, 2nd 1920), and worked on a biography of Sir Patrick Manson.

In herpetology, Alcock described five new species of reptiles, some in collaboration with the English ornithologist Frank Finn.

== Eponymous species ==
- Acromycter alcocki Gilbert & Cramer, 1897
- Bathynemertes alcocki Laidlaw, 1906
- Sabellaria alcocki Gravier, 1907
- Pourtalesia alcocki Koehler, 1914
- Aristeus alcocki Ramadan, 1938
- Pasiphaea alcocki (Wood-Mason & Alcock, 1891)
- The Alcock’s deep-reef basslet, Plectranthias alcocki Bineesh, Gopalakrishnan & Jena, 2014 is a species of fish in the family Serranidae occurring in the Western Indian Ocean.

== See also ==
- List of carcinologists
- Category:Taxa named by Alfred William Alcock
