= Lewis Radcliffe =

American naturalist, malacologist, and ichthyologist

Lewis Radcliffe (1880–1950) was a naturalist, malacologist, and ichthyologist. He was Deputy Commissioner of the United States Bureau of Fisheries until 1932 and was the assistant naturalist under Hugh McCormick Smith for the 1907–1910 Philippines Expedition. During his life, he described numerous new species of fish, including several sharks. He was also the director of the Oyster Institute of North America until his death in 1950.

== See also ==
- Category:Taxa named by Lewis Radcliffe
