= Hugh McCormick Smith =

American ichthyologist

- Hugh McCormick Smith
- Born: November 21, 1865; Washington, D.C.
- Died: September 28, 1941 (aged 75); Washington, D.C.
- Education: Georgetown University
- Scientific career
- Fields: Ichthyology; Zoology
- Workplaces: United States Fish Commission; United States Bureau of Fisheries; National Geographic Society; United States Fish and Wildlife Service; Smithsonian Institution

Hugh McCormick Smith, also H. M. Smith (November 21, 1865 – September 28, 1941) was an American ichthyologist and administrator in the United States Bureau of Fisheries.

== Biography ==
Smith was born in Washington, D.C. In 1888, he received a Doctor of Medicine from Georgetown University; then, in 1908, a Doctor of Law from the Dickinson School of Law at Dickinson College. He began working for the United States Fish Commission (formally, the United States Commission on Fish and Fisheries) in 1886 as an assistant. He directed the scientific research center there from 1897 to 1903. From 1901 to 1902, he directed the Marine Biological Laboratory at Woods Hole, Massachusetts. At the same time, he was on the faculty at Georgetown, teaching medicine from 1888 to 1902 and histology from 1895 to 1902.

From 1907 to 1910, Smith led the scientific party aboard the U.S. Bureau of Fisheries (successor organization of the U.S. Fish Commission) research ship Albatross during her two-and-a-half-year expedition to the Philippine Islands. He was an associate editor of the National Geographic Society from 1909 to 1919. He was the author of many articles and publications, both popular and scientific, about fish. With Charles Haskins Townsend he wrote '"The Pacific Salmons'" section of Trout and Salmon (New York: Macmillan, 1902), a volume of Caspar Whitney's prestigious American Sportsman's Library. Smith was deputy commissioner of the U.S. Bureau of Fisheries from its formation in 1903 until 1913 and then its commissioner from 1913 to 1922. After he was pressured to resign from that position, he moved to Siam (as Thailand was then known) during the reign of King Rama VI. He later became the first director-general of the Department of Aquatic Animal Conservation (now the Department of Fisheries) under King Rama VII in 1926. He is regarded as the pioneer of aquatic animal and fisheries science in Thailand.

Smith moved back to the United States in 1933 and was curator of zoology at the Smithsonian Institution until his death in Washington, D.C. in 1941.

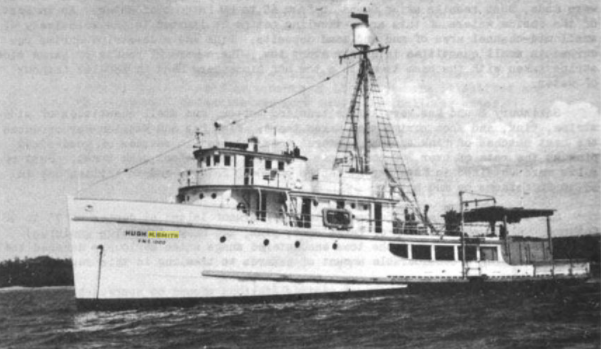
US FWS Hugh M. Smith anchored in Kihei Bay off Maui, Hawaii, ca. 1950.

== Commemoration ==
- The research vessel US FWS Hugh M. Smith, which operated in the fleet of the United States Fish and Wildlife Service from 1949 to 1959, was named in honor of Smith.

== Taxon named in his honor ==
- The Southeast Asian fish Homalopteroides smithi was named after him.

== Taxon described by him ==
- See Category:Taxa named by Hugh McCormick Smith

Government offices
Preceded by George M. Bowers	United States Commissioner of Fisheries; 1913–1922	Succeeded by Henry O'Malley
