= Ophidiiformes =

Ophidiiformes Temporal range: Maastrichtian–present
- Fawn cusk-eel, Lepophidium profundorum

Scientific classification
- Kingdom: Animalia
- Phylum: Chordata
- Class: Actinopterygii
- Clade: Percomorpha
- Order: Ophidiiformes; L. S. Berg, 1937

Type species
- Ophidion barbatum Linnaeus 1758

Suborders
- See text

Order of ray-finned fish

Ophidiiformes /ɒˈfɪdi.ɪfɔːrmiːz/ is an order of ray-finned fish that includes the cusk-eels (family Ophidiidae), pearlfishes (family Carapidae), viviparous brotulas (family Bythitidae), and others. Members of this order have small heads and long slender bodies. They have either smooth scales or no scales, a long dorsal fin and an anal fin that typically runs into the caudal fin. They mostly come from the tropics and subtropics, and live in both freshwater and marine habitats, including abyssal depths. They have adopted a range of feeding methods and lifestyles, including parasitism. The majority are egg-laying, but some are viviparous.

The earliest fossil members are known from the Maastrichtian, and include the basal ophidiiform Pastorius from Italy and several species of the basal cusk-eel Ampheristus from the United States and Germany.

== Distribution ==
This order includes a variety of deep-sea species, including the deepest known, Abyssobrotula galatheae, found at 8,370 metres (27,460 ft) in the Puerto Rico Trench. Many other species, however, live in shallow water, especially near coral reefs, while a few inhabit freshwater. Most species live in tropical or subtropical habitats, but some species are known from as far north as the coast of Greenland, and as far south as the Weddell Sea.

== Characteristics ==
Ophidiiform fish typically have slender bodies with small heads, and either smooth scales, or none at all. They have long dorsal fins, and an anal fin that is typically united with the caudal fin. The group includes pelagic, benthic, and even parasitic species, although all have a similar body form. Some species are viviparous, giving birth to live young, rather than laying eggs. They range in size from Grammanoides opisthodon which measures just 5 centimetres (2.0 in) in length, to Lamprogrammus shcherbachevi at 2 metres (6.6 ft) in length.

The families Ranicipitidae (tadpole cods) and Euclichthyidae (eucla cods) were formerly classified in this order, but are now preferred in Gadiformes; Ranicipitidae has been absorbed within the family Gadidae.

== Classification ==
The order Ophidiiformes is subdivided into suborders and families as follows:

- Order Ophidiiformes
  - Genus †Pastorius (Late Cretaceous of Italy)
  - Suborder Ophidioidei
    - Family Acanthonidae Wong & Chen, 2024 (deepsea cusk-eels)
    - Family Brotulidae Swainson, 1838 (bearded cusk-eels)
    - Family Ophidiidae Rafinesque, 1810 (cusk-eels)
    - Family Carapidae Poey, 1867 (pearlfishes)
  - Suborder Bythitoidei
    - Family Bythitidae Gill, 1861 — viviparous brotulas
    - Family Parabrotulidae Nielsen, 1968 — false brotulas

Until recent taxonomic revisions, the suborder Ophidioidei was a paraphyletic grouping. However, the Bythitoidei are viviparous and seem to make up a monophyletic group, while the Ophidioidei are oviparous.
