= Dinematichthyidae =

Scientific classification
- Kingdom: Animalia
- Phylum: Chordata
- Class: Actinopterygii
- Order: Ophidiiformes
- Family: Dinematichthyidae

Family of fishes

Dinematichthyidae is a family of fishes belonging to the order Ophidiiformes.

Genera and species:

- Genus Alionematichthys Møller & Schwarzhans, 2008
  - Alionematichthys ceylonensis Møller & Schwarzhans, 2008
  - Alionematichthys crassiceps Møller & Schwarzhans, 2008
  - Alionematichthys minyomma (Sedor & Cohen, 1987)
  - Alionematichthys phuketensis Møller & Schwarzhans, 2008
  - Alionematichthys piger (Alcock, 1890)
  - Alionematichthys plicatosurculus Møller & Schwarzhans, 2008
  - Alionematichthys riukiuensis (Aoyagi, 1954)
  - Alionematichthys samoaensis Møller & Schwarzhans, 2008
  - Alionematichthys shinoharai Møller & Schwarzhans, 2008
  - Alionematichthys suluensis Møller & Schwarzhans, 2008
  - Alionematichthys winterbottomi Møller & Schwarzhans, 2008
- Genus Beaglichthys Machida, 1993
  - Beaglichthys bleekeri Schwarzhans & Møller, 2007
  - Beaglichthys larsonae Schwarzhans & Møller, 2007
  - Beaglichthys macrophthalmus Machida, 1993
- Genus Brosmolus Machida, 1993
  - Brosmolus longicaudus Machida, 1993
- Genus Brotulinella Schwarzhans, Møller & Nielsen, 2005
  - Brotulinella taiwanensis Schwarzhans, Møller & Nielsen, 2005
- Genus Dactylosurculus Schwarzhans & Møller, 2007
  - Dactylosurculus gomoni Schwarzhans & Møller, 2007
- Genus Dermatopsis Ogilby, 1896
  - Dermatopsis greenfieldi Moller & Schwarzhans, 2006
  - Dermatopsis hoesei Moller & Schwarzhans, 2006
  - Dermatopsis joergennielseni Moller & Schwarzhans, 2006
  - Dermatopsis macrodon Ogilby, 1896
- Genus Dermatopsoides Smith, 1948
  - Dermatopsoides andersoni Moller & Schwarzhans, 2006
  - Dermatopsoides kasougae (Smith, 1943)
  - Dermatopsoides morrisonae Moller & Schwarzhans, 2006
  - Dermatopsoides talboti Cohen, 1966
- Genus Diancistrus Ogilby 1899
  - Diancistrus alatus Schwarzhans, Møller & Nielsen, 2005
  - Diancistrus alleni Schwarzhans, Møller & Nielsen, 2005
  - Diancistrus altidorsalis Schwarzhans, Møller & Nielsen, 2005
  - Diancistrus atollorum Schwarzhans, Møller & Nielsen, 2005
  - Diancistrus beateae Schwarzhans, Møller & Nielsen, 2005
  - Diancistrus brevirostris Schwarzhans, Møller & Nielsen, 2005
  - Diancistrus eremitus Schwarzhans, Møller & Nielsen, 2005
  - Diancistrus erythraeus (Fowler, 1946)
  - Diancistrus fijiensis Schwarzhans, Møller & Nielsen, 2005
  - Diancistrus fuscus (Fowler, 1946)
  - Diancistrus jackrandalli Schwarzhans, Møller & Nielsen, 2005
  - Diancistrus jeffjohnsoni Schwarzhans, Møller & Nielsen, 2005
  - Diancistrus karinae Schwarzhans, Møller & Nielsen, 2005
  - Diancistrus katrineae Schwarzhans, Møller & Nielsen, 2005
  - Diancistrus leisi Schwarzhans, Møller & Nielsen, 2005
  - Diancistrus longifilis Ogilby, 1899
  - Diancistrus machidai Schwarzhans, Møller & Nielsen, 2005
  - Diancistrus manciporus Schwarzhans, Møller & Nielsen, 2005
  - Diancistrus mcgroutheri Schwarzhans, Møller & Nielsen, 2005
  - Diancistrus mennei Schwarzhans, Møller & Nielsen, 2005
  - Diancistrus niger Schwarzhans, Møller & Nielsen, 2005
  - Diancistrus novaeguineae (Machida, 1996)
  - Diancistrus pohnpeiensis Schwarzhans, Møller & Nielsen, 2005
  - Diancistrus robustus Schwarzhans, Møller & Nielsen, 2005
  - Diancistrus springeri Schwarzhans, Møller & Nielsen, 2005
  - Diancistrus tongaensis Schwarzhans, Møller & Nielsen, 2005
  - Diancistrus vietnamensis Schwarzhans, Møller & Nielsen, 2005
- Genus Didymothallus Schwarzhans & Møller, 2007
  - Didymothallus criniceps Schwarzhans & Møller, 2007
  - Didymothallus mizolepis (Günther, 1867)
  - Didymothallus nudigena Schwarzhans & Møller, 2011
  - Didymothallus pruvosti Schwarzhans & Møller, 2007
- Genus Dinematichthys Bleeker, 1855
  - Dinematichthys dasyrhynchus Cohen & Hutchins, 1982
  - Dinematichthys iluocoeteoides Bleeker, 1855
  - Dinematichthys indicus Machida, 1994
  - Dinematichthys megasoma Machida, 1994
  - Dinematichthys minyomma Sedor & Cohen, 1987
  - Dinematichthys randalli Machida, 1994
  - Dinematichthys riukiuensis Aoyagi, 1954
  - Dinematichthys trilobatus Møller & Schwarzhans, 2008
- Genus Dipulus Waite, 1905
  - Dipulus caecus Waite, 1905
  - Dipulus hutchinsi Moller & Schwarzhans, 2006
  - Dipulus multiradiatus (McCulloch & Waite, 1918)
  - Dipulus norfolkanus Machida, 1993
- Genus Eusurculus Schwarzhans & Møller, 2007
  - Eusurculus andamanensis Schwarzhans & Møller, 2007
  - Eusurculus pistillum Schwarzhans & Møller, 2007
  - Eusurculus pristinus Schwarzhans & Møller, 2007
- Genus Gunterichthys Dawson, 1966
  - Gunterichthys bussingi Møller, Schwarzhans & Nielsen, 2004
  - Gunterichthys coheni Møller, Schwarzhans & Nielsen, 2004
  - Gunterichthys longipenis Dawson, 1966
- Genus Lapitaichthys
  - Lapitaichthys frickei Schwarzhans & Møller, 2007
- Genus Majungaichthys Schwarzhans & Møller, 2007
  - Majungaichthys agalegae Schwarzhans & Møller, 2011
  - Majungaichthys simplex Schwarzhans & Møller, 2007
- Genus Mascarenichthys Schwarzhans & Møller, 2007
  - Mascarenichthys heemstrai Schwarzhans & Møller, 2007
  - Mascarenichthys microphthalmus Schwarzhans & Møller, 2007
  - Mascarenichthys remotus Schwarzhans & Møller, 2011
- Genus Monothrix Ogilby, 1897
  - Monothrix polylepis Ogilby, 1897
- Genus Nielsenichthys Schwarzhans & Møller, 2011
  - Nielsenichthys pullus Schwarzhans & Møller, 2011
- Genus Ogilbia Jordan & Evermann 1898
  - Ogilbia boehlkei Møller, Schwarzhans & Nielsen, 2005
  - Ogilbia boydwalkeri Møller, Schwarzhans & Nielsen, 2005
  - Ogilbia cayorum Evermann & Kendall, 1898
  - Ogilbia cocoensis Møller, Schwarzhans & Nielsen, 2005
  - Ogilbia davidsmithi Møller, Schwarzhans & Nielsen, 2005
  - Ogilbia deroyi (Poll & van Mol, 1966)
  - Ogilbia galapagosensis (Poll & LeLeup, 1965)
  - Ogilbia jeffwilliamsi Møller, Schwarzhans & Nielsen, 2005
  - Ogilbia jewettae Møller, Schwarzhans & Nielsen, 2005
  - Ogilbia mccoskeri Møller, Schwarzhans & Nielsen, 2005
  - Ogilbia nigromarginata Møller, Schwarzhans & Nielsen, 2005
  - Ogilbia nudiceps Møller, Schwarzhans & Nielsen, 2005
  - Ogilbia robertsoni Møller, Schwarzhans & Nielsen, 2005
  - Ogilbia sabaji Møller, Schwarzhans & Nielsen, 2005
  - Ogilbia sedorae Møller, Schwarzhans & Nielsen, 2005
  - Ogilbia suarezae Møller, Schwarzhans & Nielsen, 2005
  - Ogilbia tyleri Møller, Schwarzhans & Nielsen, 2005
  - Ogilbia ventralis (Gill, 1863)
- Genus Ogilbichthys Møller, Schwarzhans & Nielsen, 2004
  - Ogilbichthys ferocis Møller, Schwarzhans & Nielsen, 2004
  - Ogilbichthys haitiensis Møller, Schwarzhans & Nielsen, 2004
  - Ogilbichthys kakuki Møller, Schwarzhans & Nielsen, 2004
  - Ogilbichthys longimanus Møller, Schwarzhans & Nielsen, 2004
  - Ogilbichthys microphthalmus Møller, Schwarzhans & Nielsen, 2004
  - Ogilbichthys puertoricoensis Møller, Schwarzhans & Nielsen, 2004
  - Ogilbichthys tobagoensis Møller, Schwarzhans & Nielsen, 2004
- Genus Paradiancistrus Schwarzhans, Møller & Nielsen, 2005
  - Paradiancistrus acutirostris Schwarzhans, Møller & Nielsen, 2005
  - Paradiancistrus christmasensis Schwarzhans & Møller, 2011
  - Paradiancistrus cuyoensis Schwarzhans, Møller & Nielsen, 2005
  - Paradiancistrus lombokensis Schwarzhans & Møller, 2007
- Genus Porocephalichthys Møller & Schwarzhans, 2008
  - Porocephalichthys dasyrhynchus (Cohen & Hutchins, 1982)
- Genus Pseudogilbia Møller, Schwarzhans & Nielsen, 2004
  - Pseudogilbia sanblasensis Møller, Schwarzhans & Nielsen, 2004
- Genus Typhlias Whitley, 1951
  - Typhlias pearsei Hubbs, 1938
- Genus Ungusurculus Schwarzhans & Møller, 2007
  - Ungusurculus collettei Schwarzhans & Møller, 2007
  - Ungusurculus komodoensis Schwarzhans & Møller, 2007
  - Ungusurculus philippinensis Schwarzhans & Møller, 2007
  - Ungusurculus riauensis Schwarzhans & Møller, 2007
  - Ungusurculus sundaensis Schwarzhans & Møller, 2007
  - Ungusurculus williamsis Schwarzhans & Møller, 2007
- Genus Zephyrichthys Schwarzhans & Møller, 2007
  - Zephyrichthys barryi Schwarzhans & Møller, 2007
