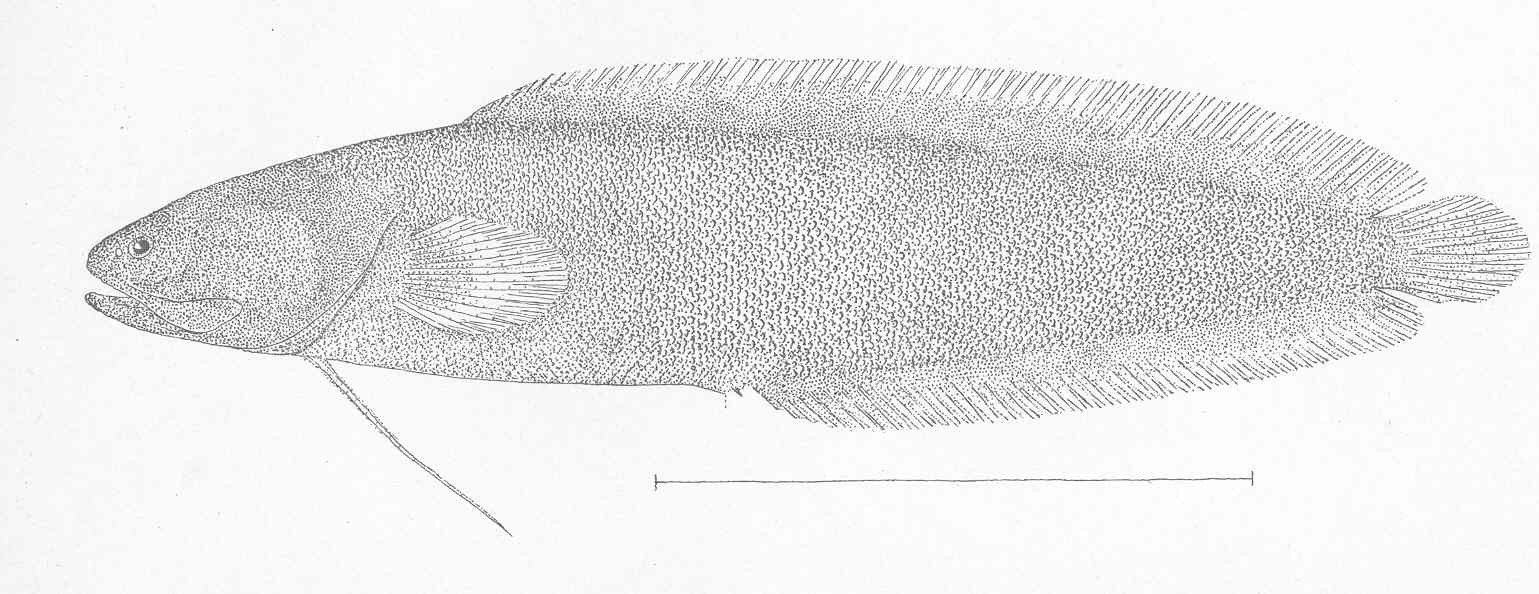
- Dinematichthys ventralis

Scientific classification
- Kingdom: Animalia
- Phylum: Chordata
- Class: Actinopterygii
- Order: Ophidiiformes
- Family: Bythitidae
- Subfamily: Brosmophycinae
- Tribe: Dinematichthyini; Cohen and Nielsen, 1978

= Dinematichthyini =

Tribe of fishes

Dinematichthyini is a tribe of viviparous brotulas, which is conventionally placed within the subfamily Brosmophycinae. They are differentiated from the other tribe within that subfamily, the Brosmophycinae, by having a single pair of ossified genital claspers, having an absence or greatly reduced scales on the head and having the posterior end of the maxillary bone showing a small amount of vertical expansion. A review of the viviparous brotulas carried out in 2016 elevated the tribe to a family, the Dinematichthyidae.

== Genera ==
The following genera are included in the tribe Dinematichthyini:

- Alionematichthys
- Beaglichthys
- Brosmolus
- Brotulinella
- Dactylosurculus
- Dermatopsis
- Dermatopsoides
- Diancistrus
- Didymothallus
- Dinematichthys
- Dipulus
- Gunterichthys
- Lapitaichthys
- Majungaichthys
- Mascarenichthys
- Monothrix
- Nielsenichthys
- Ogilbia
- Ogilbichthys
- Paradiancistrus
- Porocephalichthys
- Typhliasina
- Ungusurculus
- Zephyrichthys
