= Fiordichthys =

Scientific classification
- Kingdom: Animalia
- Phylum: Chordata
- Class: Actinopterygii
- Order: Ophidiiformes
- Family: Bythitidae
- Subfamily: Brosmophycinae
- Tribe: Brosmophycini
- Genus: Fiordichthys; Paulin, 1995

Type species
- Fiordichthys slartibartfasti Paulin, 1995

Genus of fishes

Fiordichthys is a genus of viviparous brotula native to the southwest Pacific Ocean.

== Species ==
There are currently two recognized species in this genus:

- Fiordichthys paxtoni (J. G. Nielsen & Cohen, 1986) (Baldhead cusk)
- Fiordichthys slartibartfasti Paulin, 1995
