= Grammonus waikiki =

Scientific classification
- Kingdom: Animalia
- Phylum: Chordata
- Class: Actinopterygii
- Order: Ophidiiformes
- Family: Bythitidae
- Genus: Grammonus
- Species: G. waikiki

Binomial name
- Grammonus waikiki (Cohen, 1964)

Synonyms
- Oligopus waikiki Cohen, 1964; Grammonus niger (Gosline, 1953); Microbrotula niger Gosline, 1953

Species of fish

Grammonus waikiki, or the Waikiki viviparous brotula, is a species of viviparous brotula found in the Hawaiian Islands where it occurs at depths of around 3–18 metres (9.8–59.1 ft).

== Description ==
This species grows to a length of 7.2 centimetres (2.8 in) SL. The head and body are brown, while the fins are dark brown.

== Taxonomy ==
Grammonus waikiki was originally named Microbrotula nigra by Terry Gosline in 1953, but was later removed from Microbrotula by Cohen (1964), who transferred the species to Oligopus, as O. niger. However, this referral made nigra a secondary homonym of Oligopus niger Risso, 1827 (a synonym of Grammonus ater), necessitating erection of the replacement name Oligopus waikiki. Later, Oligopus was shown by Nielsen (1999) to be a junior synonym of Pteraclis, so Grammonus was resurrected for all bythitids previously assigned to Oligopus, creating the new combination Grammonus waikiki.
