= Thalassobathia pelagica =

Conservation status
- Least Concern (IUCN 3.1)

Scientific classification
- Domain: Eukaryota
- Kingdom: Animalia
- Phylum: Chordata
- Class: Actinopterygii
- Order: Ophidiiformes
- Family: Bythitidae
- Genus: Thalassobathia
- Species: T. pelagica

Binomial name
- Thalassobathia pelagica (Cohen, 1963)

Species of fish

Thalassobathia pelagica is a species of fish in the family Bythitidae (viviparous brotulas). It is sometimes referred to by the common name pelagic brotula.

== Description ==
Thalassobathia pelagica has a maximum length of 22.1 cm (8.7 in). It has 72–79 dorsal soft rays, 58–65 anal soft rays and 22–29 pectoral soft rays. It has 7 branchiostegal rays and its head and body are compressed.

== Habitat ==
Thalassobathia pelagica is bathypelagic, living at depths of 500–1,000 m (1,600–3,300 ft) in the Atlantic Ocean. Two specimens have been collected between Iceland and Ireland, and one from the Gulf of Guinea. It has also been reported from Greenland and Iceland. A specimen from the Bering Sea has uncertain identification as this species.

== Behaviour ==
Thalassobathia pelagica lives in close association with the sea jelly Stygiomedusa gigantea.
