= New Providence cusk-eel =

Conservation status
- Vulnerable (IUCN 3.1)

Scientific classification
- Kingdom: Animalia
- Phylum: Chordata
- Class: Actinopterygii
- Order: Ophidiiformes
- Family: Bythitidae
- Genus: Lucifuga
- Species: L. spelaeotes

Binomial name
- Lucifuga spelaeotes Cohen & C. R. Robins, 1970

Species of fish

The New Providence cusk-eel (Lucifuga spelaeotes), also known as the Bahama cavefish, is a species of cavefish in the family Bythitidae. It is endemic to the Bahamas, where it has been reported from a small number of marine blue holes, inland caverns and chasms. It is the only known cusk eel species that can occur in surface waters; all others exclusively live in the deep parts of the ocean, or in underwater caves. It was first described in 1970.
