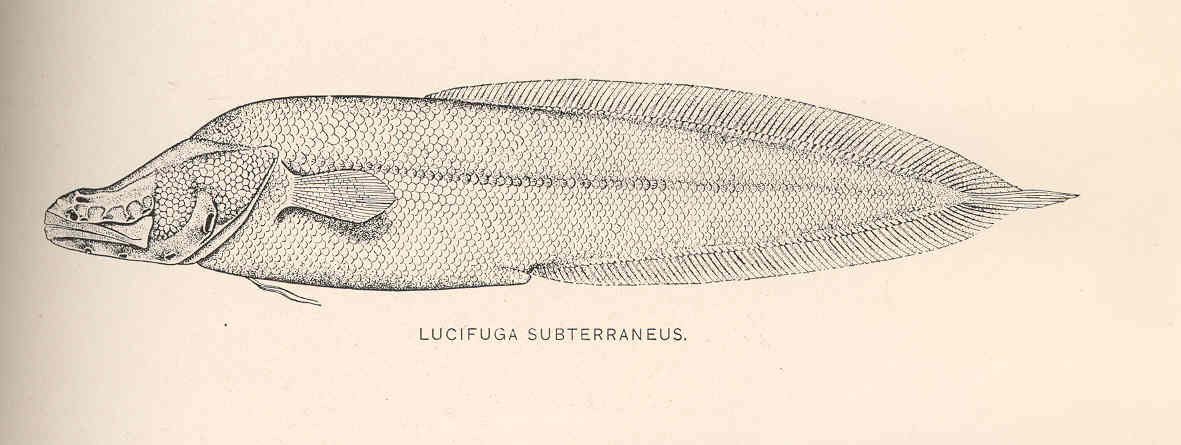
- Lucifuga subterraneus

Scientific classification
- Kingdom: Animalia
- Phylum: Chordata
- Class: Actinopterygii
- Order: Ophidiiformes
- Family: Bythitidae
- Subfamily: Brosmophycinae
- Tribe: Brosmophycini
- Genus: Lucifuga; Poey, 1858

Type species
- Lucifuga subterraneus Poey 1858

Species
- 8, see text

Synonyms
- Stygicola Gill, 1863

= Lucifuga =

Genus of fishes

Lucifuga is a genus of viviparous brotulas. Most of the species are native to caves and sinkholes in Cuba and the Bahamas; L. inopinata from deep water off the Galápagos Islands is the only exception. The four species rated by the IUCN are all considered vulnerable. The largest species in the genus reaches about 15 cm (5.9 in) in length.

== Species ==
There are currently eight recognized species in this genus:

- Lucifuga dentata Poey, 1858 (Toothed Cuban cusk-eel)
- Lucifuga gibarensis Hernández, Møller, Casane & García-Machado, 2020
- Lucifuga inopinata Cohen & McCosker, 1998
- Lucifuga lucayana Møller, Schwarzhans, Iliffe & J. G. Nielsen, 2006 (Lucaya cavebrotula)
- Lucifuga simile Nalbant, 1981
- Lucifuga spelaeotes Cohen & C. R. Robins, 1970 (New Providence cusk-eel)
- Lucifuga subterranea Poey, 1858 (Cuban cusk-eel)
- Lucifuga teresinarum Díaz Pérez, 1988
