= Parasaccogaster melanomycter =

Conservation status
- Data Deficient (IUCN 3.1)

Scientific classification
- Kingdom: Animalia
- Phylum: Chordata
- Class: Actinopterygii
- Order: Ophidiiformes
- Family: Bythitidae
- Genus: Parasaccogaster
- Species: P. melanomycter

Binomial name
- Parasaccogaster melanomycter (Cohen, 1981)

Synonyms
- Saccogaster melanomycter Cohen, 1981

Species of fish

Parasaccogaster melanomycter is a species of viviparous brotula endemic to Colombia.
