= Microbrotula rubra =

Scientific classification
- Kingdom: Animalia
- Phylum: Chordata
- Class: Actinopterygii
- Order: Ophidiiformes
- Family: Bythitidae
- Subfamily: Bythitinae
- Genus: Microbrotula
- Species: M. rubra

Binomial name
- Microbrotula rubra Gosline, 1953

Species of fish

Microbrotula rubra, also called the red viviparous brotula, is a species of viviparous brotula endemic to the Hawaiian Islands.

The red brotula is translucent red in life and grows to a length of 5.4 centimetres (2.1 in) SL. It is the type species of the genus Microbrotula.
