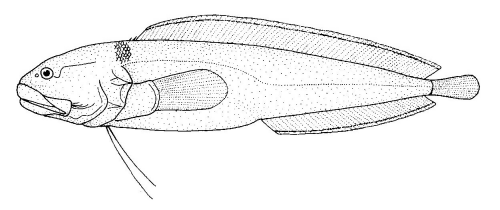
- Grey Brotula (Bidenichthys consobrinus)

Scientific classification
- Domain: Eukaryota
- Kingdom: Animalia
- Phylum: Chordata
- Class: Actinopterygii
- Order: Ophidiiformes
- Family: Bythitidae
- Subfamily: Brosmophycinae
- Tribe: Brosmophycini; Gill, 1862

= Brosmophycini =

Tribe of fishes

Brosmophycini is a tribe of viviparous brotula, one of two tribes in the subfamily Brosmophycinae. They are distinguished from the other brosmophycin tribe, the Dinematichthyini, by having a male intromittent organ which has no ossified parts, a scale-covered body and well developed gill rakers.

== Genera ==
The following genera are classified as being members of the tribe Brosmophycini:

- Bidenichthys
- Brosmodorsalis
- Brosmophyciops
- Brosmophycis
- Eusurculus
- Fiordichthys
- Lucifuga
- Melodichthys
