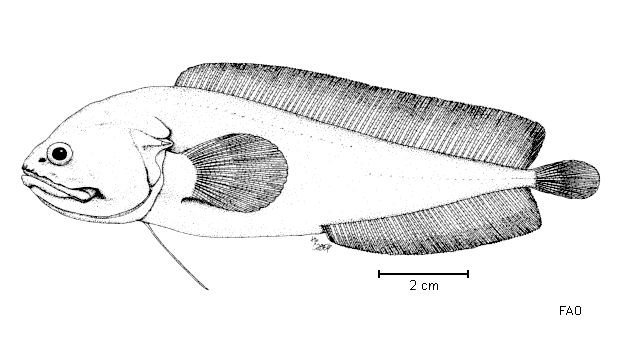

Scientific classification
- Kingdom: Animalia
- Phylum: Chordata
- Class: Actinopterygii
- Division: Teleostei
- Order: Ophidiiformes
- Family: Bythitidae
- Genus: Bidenichthys
- Species: B. slartibartfasti

Binomial name
- Bidenichthys slartibartfasti Paulin, 1995

= Fiordland brotula =

Species of fish

The Fiordland brotula, Bidenichthys slartibartfasti (originally Fiordichthys slartibartfasti Paulin, 1995), is a viviparous brotula found only in the Fiordland region of the South Island of New Zealand. It inhabits spaces in rock rubble and is found at depths of from 10 to 12 metres (33 to 39 ft). This species grows to a length of 11.1 centimetres (4.4 in) SL.

== Etymology ==
The genus name Bidenichthys is derived from Latin and Greek roots for two, teeth, and fish, as well as referencing C Leo Biden, who collected specimens held by the South African Museum. Slartibartfasti references Slartibartfast from Douglas Adams' Hitchhiker's Guide to the Galaxy books.
