= Melodichthys =

Conservation status
- Data Deficient (IUCN 3.1)

Scientific classification
- Kingdom: Animalia
- Phylum: Chordata
- Class: Actinopterygii
- Division: Teleostei
- Order: Ophidiiformes
- Family: Bythitidae
- Tribe: Brosmophycini
- Genus: Melodichthys
- Species: M. hadrocephalus

Binomial name
- Melodichthys hadrocephalus J. G. Nielsen & Cohen, 1986

Species of fish

Melodichthys hadrocephalus is a rare species of viviparous brotula found in the northeastern Atlantic Ocean off the coast of France. It is found at depths from 300 to 400 metres (980 to 1,310 ft). This is the only known species in its genus. It is known from a single specimen.
