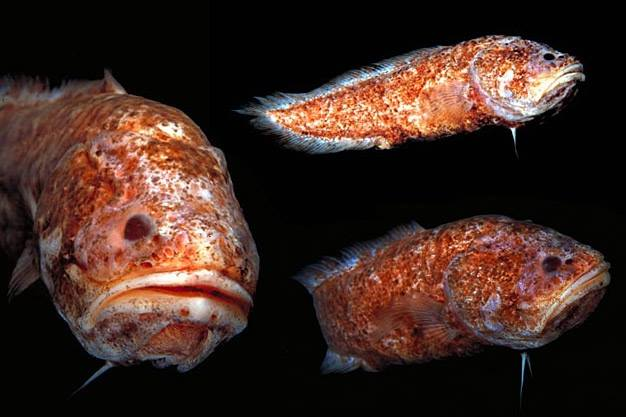
- Grammonus thielei

Scientific classification
- Kingdom: Animalia
- Phylum: Chordata
- Class: Actinopterygii
- Order: Ophidiiformes
- Family: Bythitidae
- Subfamily: Bythitinae
- Genus: Grammonus; T. N. Gill, 1896

Type species
- Oligopus ater Risso, 1810

Synonyms
- Bathystorreus Howell-Rivero, 1934; Eutyx Heller & Snodgrass, 1903; Gadopsis De Filippi], 1855; Grammonoides Smith, 1948; Leptopodus Goldfuss, 1820

= Grammonus =

Genus of fishes

Grammonus is a genus of viviparous brotula.

== Species ==
There are currently 11 recognized species in this genus:

- Grammonus ater (A. Risso, 1810)
- Grammonus claudei (Torre y Huerta, 1930) (Reef-cave brotula)
- Grammonus diagrammus (Heller & Snodgrass, 1903) (Purple brotula)
- Grammonus longhursti (Cohen, 1964)
- Grammonus minutus J. G. Nielsen & Prokofiev, 2010
- Grammonus nagaredai J. E. Randall & Hughes, 2008
- Grammonus opisthodon J. L. B. Smith, 1934 (Bighead brotula)
- Grammonus robustus H. M. Smith & Radcliffe, 1913
- Grammonus thielei J. G. Nielsen & Cohen, 2004
- Grammonus waikiki (Cohen, 1964)
- Grammonus yunokawai J. G. Nielsen, 2007
