= Zephyrichthys =

Conservation status
- Least Concern (IUCN 3.1)

Scientific classification
- Kingdom: Animalia
- Phylum: Chordata
- Class: Actinopterygii
- Division: Teleostei
- Order: Ophidiiformes
- Family: Bythitidae
- Subfamily: Brosmophycinae
- Tribe: Dinematichthyini
- Genus: Zephyrichthys
- Species: Z. barryi

Binomial name
- Zephyrichthys barryi Schwarzhans & Møller, 2007

Species of fish

Zephyrichthys barryi is a species of viviparous brotula found in the Indian Ocean waters around western Australia. This species grows to a length of 5.9 centimetres (2.3 in) SL. This species is the only known member of its genus. The etymology of the name is that the generic name is a compound of zephrys which is Greek for the west wind and refers to the species western Australian range and ichthys, "fish". The specific name honours in the ichthyologist J. Barry Hutchins of the Western Australian Museum (WAM) for his contribution to the knowledge of Australian fishes and for allowing the describers of Z. barryi access to the museum's collections.
