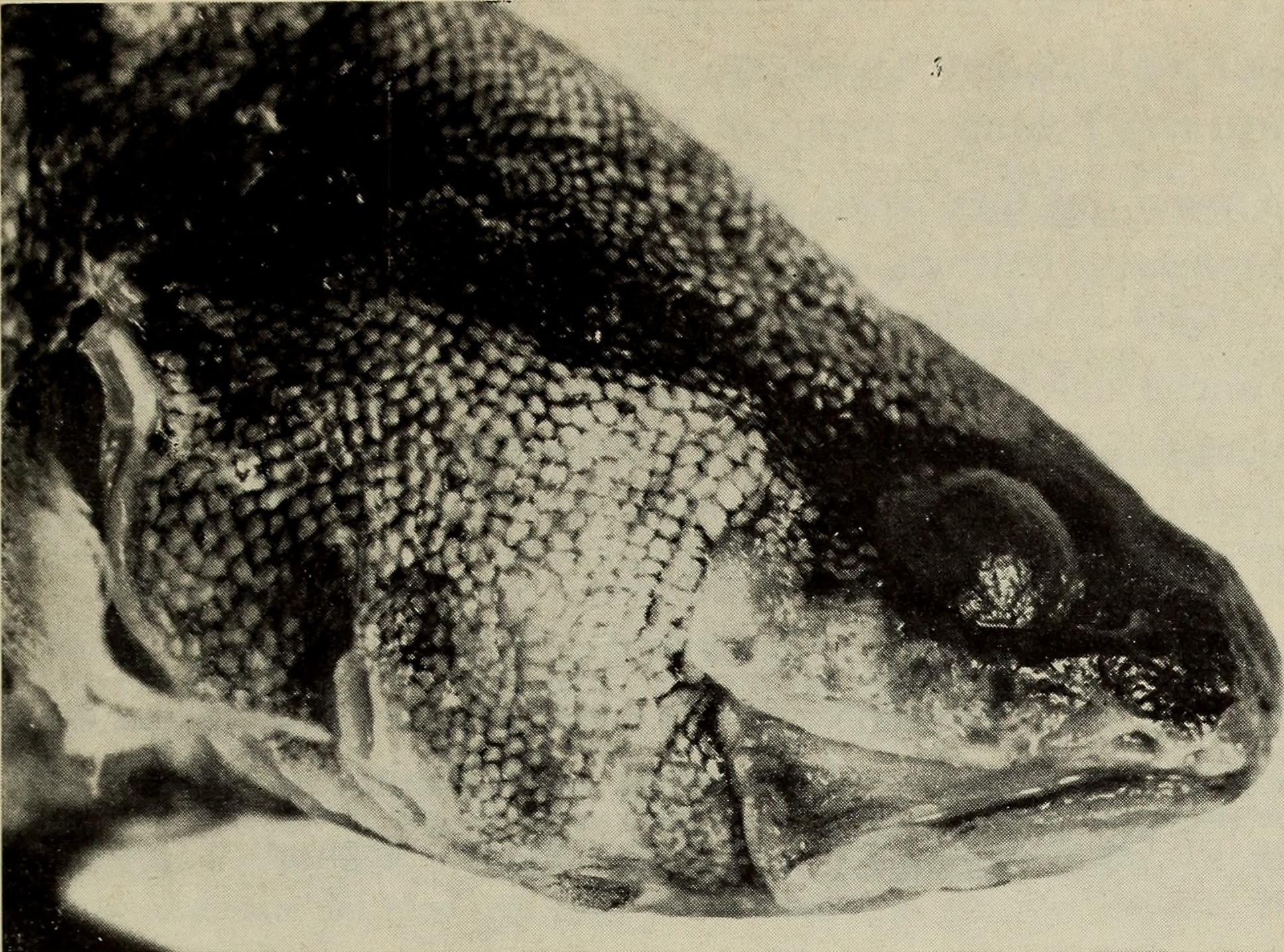
- Head

Conservation status
- Least Concern (IUCN 3.1)

Scientific classification
- Domain: Eukaryota
- Kingdom: Animalia
- Phylum: Chordata
- Class: Actinopterygii
- Order: Ophidiiformes
- Family: Bythitidae
- Genus: Cataetyx
- Species: C. alleni

Binomial name
- Cataetyx alleni (Byrne, 1906)

Synonyms
- Cataetyx brevis Koefoed, 1927; Cataetyx leucos Osório, 1917; Oculospinus brevis Koefoed, 1927; Pteridium alleni Byrne, 1906

= Cataetyx alleni =

Species of fish

Cataetyx alleni, sometimes called Allen's brotula, is a species of fish in the family Bythitidae (viviparous brotulas).

== Description ==
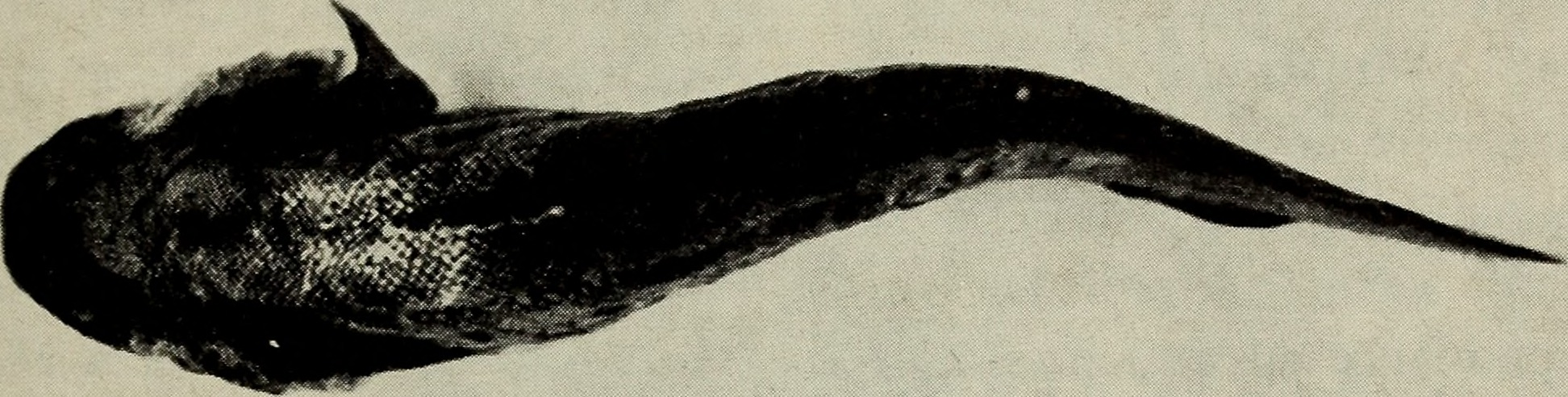
Dorsal view

Cataetyx alleni is grey, with a maximum length of 12 cm (4.7 in). It has 109–111 dorsal finrays, 79–83 anal finrays, and 31–32 pectoral finrays.

== Habitat ==
Cataetyx alleni is bathydemersal, living at depths of 480–1,000 m (1,570–3,280 ft) in the Atlantic Ocean and Mediterranean Sea.

== Behaviour ==
Cataetyx alleni reproduces viviparously. It feeds on polychaetes and benthic crustaceans.
