= Bidenichthys okamotoi =

Scientific classification
- Kingdom: Animalia
- Phylum: Chordata
- Class: Actinopterygii
- Order: Ophidiiformes
- Family: Bythitidae
- Genus: Bidenichthys
- Species: B. okamotoi

Binomial name
- Bidenichthys okamotoi Møller, Schwarzhans, Lauridsen & Nielsen, 2021

Species of fish

Bidenichthys okamotoi is a species of fish in the family Bythitidae. It is found at the Koko Seamount in the central-northern Pacific Ocean.

== Etymology ==
The species is named after the collector of the two type specimens, Dr. Makoto Okamoto, of the Seikai National Fisheries Research Institute, in honor of his numerous contributions to Pacific ichthyology.
