= Calamopteryx =

Scientific classification
- Kingdom: Animalia
- Phylum: Chordata
- Class: Actinopterygii
- Order: Ophidiiformes
- Family: Bythitidae
- Subfamily: Bythitinae
- Genus: Calamopteryx; J. E. Böhlke & Cohen, 1966

Type species
- Calamopteryx goslinei Böhlke & Cohen, 1966

Genus of fishes

Calamopteryx is a genus of viviparous brotulas.

== Species ==
There are currently three recognized species in this genus:

- Calamopteryx goslinei J. E. Böhlke & Cohen, 1966 (Longarm brotula)
- Calamopteryx jeb Cohen, 1973
- Calamopteryx robinsorum Cohen, 1973 (Teacher brotula)
