= Bellottia =

Scientific classification
- Domain: Eukaryota
- Kingdom: Animalia
- Phylum: Chordata
- Class: Actinopterygii
- Order: Ophidiiformes
- Family: Bythitidae
- Subfamily: Bythitinae
- Genus: Bellottia; Giglioli, 1883

Type species
- Bellottia apoda Giglioli, 1883

Genus of fishes

Bellottia is a genus of viviparous brotulas which is found in the subtropical waters of the North Atlantic, the Mediterranean Sea and the Indo-Pacific.

== Species ==
There are currently four recognized species in this genus:

- Bellottia apoda Giglioli, 1883
- Bellottia armiger (H. M. Smith & Radcliffe, 1913)
- Bellottia galatheae J. G. Nielsen & Møller, 2008
- Bellottia robusta J. G. Nielsen, S. W. Ross & Cohen, 2009
