= Ematops =

Conservation status
- Least Concern (IUCN 3.1)

Scientific classification
- Kingdom: Animalia
- Phylum: Chordata
- Class: Actinopterygii
- Order: Ophidiiformes
- Family: Bythitidae
- Subfamily: Bythitinae
- Genus: Ematops; Schwarzhans & J. G. Nielsen, 2011
- Species: E. randalli

Binomial name
- Ematops randalli (Cohen & Wourms, 1976)

Synonyms
- Microbrotula randalli Cohen & Wourms, 1976

Species of fish

Ematops randalli is a species of viviparous brotula found in the Pacific Ocean around Samoa and Vanuatu where it inhabits reef environments. This species grows to a length of 4.2 centimetres (1.7 in) SL. The specific name honours the American ichthyologist John E. Randall of the Bishop Museum who assisted in the collection of the type.
