= Lucifuga simile =

Conservation status
- Critically Endangered (IUCN 3.1)

Scientific classification
- Kingdom: Animalia
- Phylum: Chordata
- Class: Actinopterygii
- Order: Ophidiiformes
- Family: Bythitidae
- Genus: Lucifuga
- Species: L. simile

Binomial name
- Lucifuga simile Nalbant, 1981

Species of fish

Lucifuga simile is a species of cavefish in the family Bythitidae. It is endemic to Cuba. It is a demersal species found in freshwater and brackish water. It can reach a length of 8.8 centimetres (3.5 in).
