= Luciobrotula nolfi =

Scientific classification
- Kingdom: Animalia
- Phylum: Chordata
- Class: Actinopterygii
- Order: Ophidiiformes
- Family: Ophidiidae
- Genus: Luciobrotula
- Species: L. nolfi

Binomial name
- Luciobrotula nolfi Cohen, 1981

Species of fish

Luciobrotula nolfi is a species of fish in the family Ophidiidae.
