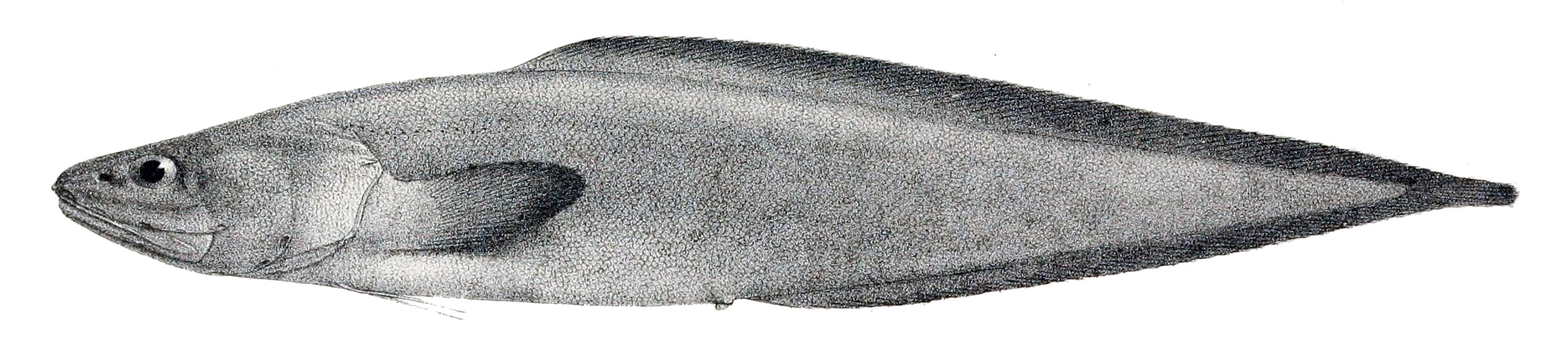
- Drawing by R. Mintern

Scientific classification
- Domain: Eukaryota
- Kingdom: Animalia
- Phylum: Chordata
- Class: Actinopterygii
- Order: Ophidiiformes
- Family: Bythitidae
- Genus: Cataetyx
- Species: C. messieri

Binomial name
- Cataetyx messieri Günther, 1878

= Hairlip brotula =

Species of fish

The hairlip brotula, Cataetyx messieri, is a viviparous brotula of the genus Cataetyx, found around South America from Argentina to Chile at depths of between 140 and 1,649 metres (459 and 5,410 ft) . Their length is between 60 and 70 centimetres (24 and 28 in).
