= Red brotula =

Conservation status
- Least Concern (IUCN 3.1)

Scientific classification
- Kingdom: Animalia
- Phylum: Chordata
- Class: Actinopterygii
- Order: Ophidiiformes
- Family: Bythitidae
- Subfamily: Brosmophycinae
- Tribe: Brosmophycini
- Genus: Brosmophycis; T. N. Gill, 1861
- Species: B. marginata

Binomial name
- Brosmophycis marginata (Ayres, 1854)

Synonyms
- Brosmius marginatus Ayres, 1854

Species of fish

The Red brotula (Brosmophycis marginata) is a species of viviparous brotula found along the North American Pacific coast from Alaska to Baja California. This fish is often displayed in public aquariums. This species grows to a length of 46 centimetres (18 in) TL. The red brotula is the only known member of its genus.
