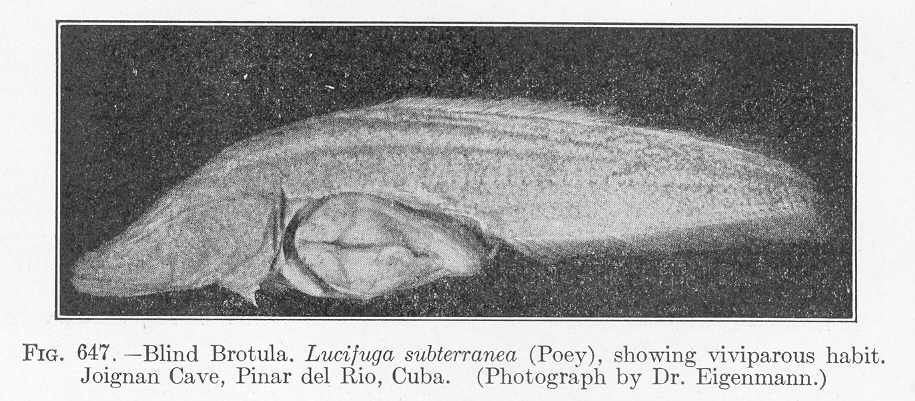

Conservation status
- Endangered (IUCN 3.1)

Scientific classification
- Kingdom: Animalia
- Phylum: Chordata
- Class: Actinopterygii
- Order: Ophidiiformes
- Family: Bythitidae
- Genus: Lucifuga
- Species: L. subterranea

Binomial name
- Lucifuga subterranea Poey, 1858

= Lucifuga subterranea =

Species of fish

Lucifuga subterranea, or the Cuban cusk-eel, is a species of cavefish in the family Bythitidae. It is endemic to Cuba. Within the caves, sinkholes and crevices in which it occurs it is common, it feeds on cirolanid isopods.
