= Nielsenichthys =

Conservation status
- Data Deficient (IUCN 3.1)

Scientific classification
- Kingdom: Animalia
- Phylum: Chordata
- Class: Actinopterygii
- Division: Teleostei
- Order: Ophidiiformes
- Family: Bythitidae
- Subfamily: Brosmophycinae
- Tribe: Dinematichthyini
- Genus: Nielsenichthys
- Species: N. pullus

Binomial name
- Nielsenichthys pullus Schwarzhans & Møller, 2011

Species of fish

Nielsenichthys pullus is a species of viviparous brotula found in Pacific Ocean waters around Indonesia where it occurs at depths of 5 to 20 metres (16 to 66 ft). This species grows to a length of 3.8 centimetres (1.5 in) SL. This is the only known species in its genus.
