= Bidenichthys capensis =

Conservation status
- Least Concern (IUCN 3.1)

Scientific classification
- Kingdom: Animalia
- Phylum: Chordata
- Class: Actinopterygii
- Order: Ophidiiformes
- Family: Bythitidae
- Genus: Bidenichthys
- Species: B. capensis

Binomial name
- Bidenichthys capensis Barnard, 1934

Species of fish

Bidenichthys capensis, the freetail brotula, is an uncommon South African fish of the family Bythitidae. The species is found in intertidal zones and rocky tidepools ranging from East London to the Cape of Good Hope, South Africa. It grows up to 90 mm long TL.
