= Bythites =

Scientific classification
- Kingdom: Animalia
- Phylum: Chordata
- Class: Actinopterygii
- Order: Ophidiiformes
- Family: Bythitidae
- Subfamily: Bythitinae
- Genus: Bythites; J. C. H. Reinhardt, 1835

Type species
- Bythites fuscus Reinhardt, 1835

Genus of fishes

Bythites is a genus of viviparous brotulas found in the Atlantic Ocean.

== Species ==
There are currently three recognized species in this genus:

- Bythites fuscus J. C. H. Reinhardt, 1837 (Arctic brotula)
- Bythites gerdae J. G. Nielsen & Cohen, 1973
- Bythites islandicus J. G. Nielsen & Cohen, 1973
