= Parasaccogaster =

Scientific classification
- Kingdom: Animalia
- Phylum: Chordata
- Class: Actinopterygii
- Order: Ophidiiformes
- Family: Bythitidae
- Subfamily: Bythitinae
- Genus: Parasaccogaster; J. G. Nielsen, Schwarzhans & Cohen, 2012

Type species
- Saccogaster normae Cohen & Nielsen, 1972

Genus of fishes

Parasaccogaster is a genus of viviparous brotulas.

== Species ==
There are currently three recognized species in this genus:

- Parasaccogaster melanomycter (Cohen, 1981)
- Parasaccogaster normae (Cohen & J. G. Nielsen, 1972)
- Parasaccogaster rhamphidognatha (Cohen, 1987)
