= S. dentata =

S. dentata may refer to:

- Smilisca dentata, the rana-de arbol de Tierras Altas, a frog species endemic to Mexico
- Stygicola dentata, a fish species endemic to Cuba

== See also ==
- Dentata (disambiguation)
