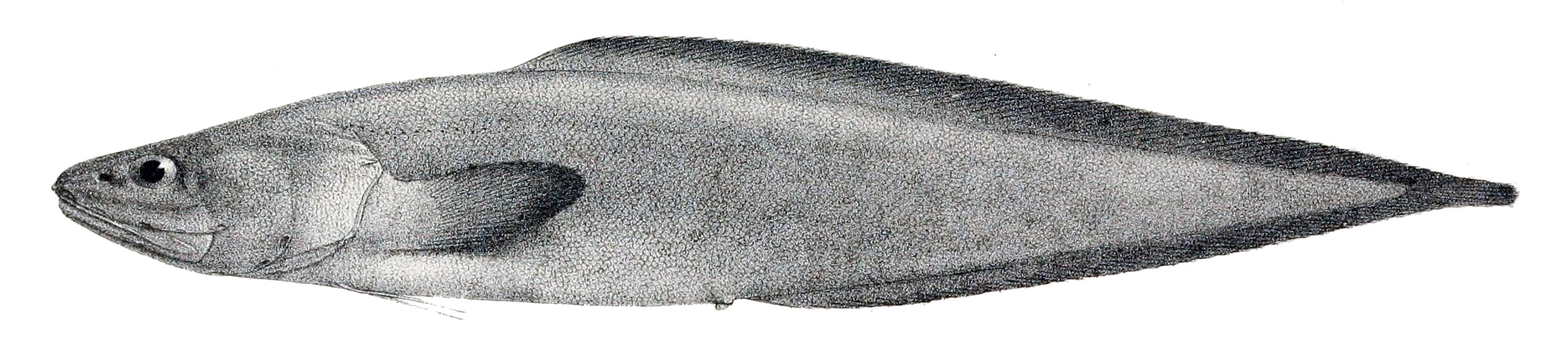
- C. messieri

Scientific classification
- Kingdom: Animalia
- Phylum: Chordata
- Class: Actinopterygii
- Order: Ophidiiformes
- Family: Bythitidae
- Subfamily: Bythitinae
- Genus: Cataetyx; Günther, 1887

Type species
- Sirembo messieri Günther, 1878

= Cataetyx =

Genus of fishes

Cataetyx is a genus of viviparous brotulas.

== Species ==
There are currently 12 recognized species in this genus:

- Cataetyx alleni (Byrne, 1906)
- Cataetyx bruuni (J. G. Nielsen & Nybelin, 1963)
- Cataetyx chthamalorhynchus Cohen, 1981
- Cataetyx hawaiiensis Gosline, 1954
- Cataetyx laticeps Koefoed, 1927
- Cataetyx lepidogenys (H. M. Smith & Radcliffe, 1913)
- Cataetyx messieri (Günther, 1878) (Hair-lip brotula)
- Cataetyx nielseni Balushkin & Prokofiev, 2005 (Nielsen's catetyx)
- Cataetyx niki Cohen, 1981 (Brown brotula)
- Cataetyx platyrhynchus Machida, 1984
- Cataetyx rubrirostris C. H. Gilbert, 1890 (Rubynose brotula)
- Cataetyx simus Garman, 1899
