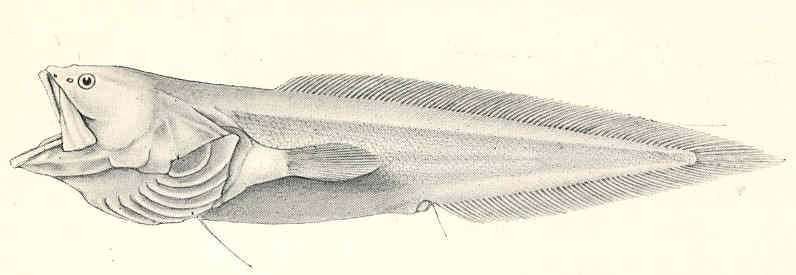
- Saccogaster maculata

Scientific classification
- Kingdom: Animalia
- Phylum: Chordata
- Class: Actinopterygii
- Order: Ophidiiformes
- Family: Bythitidae
- Subfamily: Bythitinae
- Genus: Saccogaster; Alcock, 1889

Type species
- Saccogaster maculata Alcock 1889

Synonyms
- Barbuliceps Chan, 1966

= Saccogaster =

Saccogaster Temporal range: Middle Eocene to Present

Genus of fishes

Saccogaster is a genus of viviparous brotulas. They are found in the western Atlantic and Indo-Pacific.

== Species ==
There are currently eight recognized species in this genus:

- Saccogaster brayae J. G. Nielsen, Schwarzhans & Cohen, 2012
- Saccogaster hawaii Cohen & J. G. Nielsen, 1972
- Saccogaster horrida J. G. Nielsen, Schwarzhans & Cohen, 2012
- Saccogaster maculata Alcock, 1889
- Saccogaster nikoliviae J. G. Nielsen, Schwarzhans & Cohen, 2012
- Saccogaster parva Cohen & J. G. Nielsen, 1972
- Saccogaster staigeri Cohen & J. G. Nielsen, 1972
- Saccogaster tuberculata (W. L. Y. Chan, 1966) (Bagbelly cusk)
