= Shaggy cusk =

Conservation status
- Least Concern (IUCN 3.1)

Scientific classification
- Kingdom: Animalia
- Phylum: Chordata
- Class: Actinopterygii
- Order: Ophidiiformes
- Family: Bythitidae
- Subfamily: Brosmophycinae
- Tribe: Dinematichthyini
- Genus: Porocephalichthys
- Species: P. dasyrhynchus

Binomial name
- Porocephalichthys dasyrhynchus (Cohen & Hutchins, 1982)

Synonyms
- Dinematichthys dasyrhynchus Cohen & Hutchins, 1982

Species of fish

The Shaggy cusk (Porocephalichthys dasyrhynchus) is a species of viviparous brotula found in reefs around Rottnest Island, Western Australia. This species grows to a length of 13.6 centimetres (5.4 in) SL. This is the only known species in its genus. This species, while uncommon, is not considered to be at any risk.
