= Luciobrotula =

Scientific classification
- Kingdom: Animalia
- Phylum: Chordata
- Class: Actinopterygii
- Order: Ophidiiformes
- Family: Ophidiidae
- Subfamily: Neobythitinae
- Genus: Luciobrotula; H. M. Smith & Radcliffe, 1913

Type species
- Luciobrotula bartschi Smith & Radcliffe, 1913

Genus of fishes

Luciobrotula is a genus of cusk-eels. The larvae have an ovoid body, elongate anterior dorsal-fin ray, and long trailing fleshy filament

== Species ==
There are currently six recognized species in this genus:

- Luciobrotula bartschi H. M. Smith & Radcliffe, 1913
- Luciobrotula brasiliensis J. G. Nielsen, 2009
- Luciobrotula coheni J. G. Nielsen, 2009
- Luciobrotula corethromycter Cohen, 1964
- Luciobrotula lineata (Gosline, 1954)
- Luciobrotula nolfi Cohen, 1981
- Luciobrotula polylepis Wong, Lee & Chen, 2021
