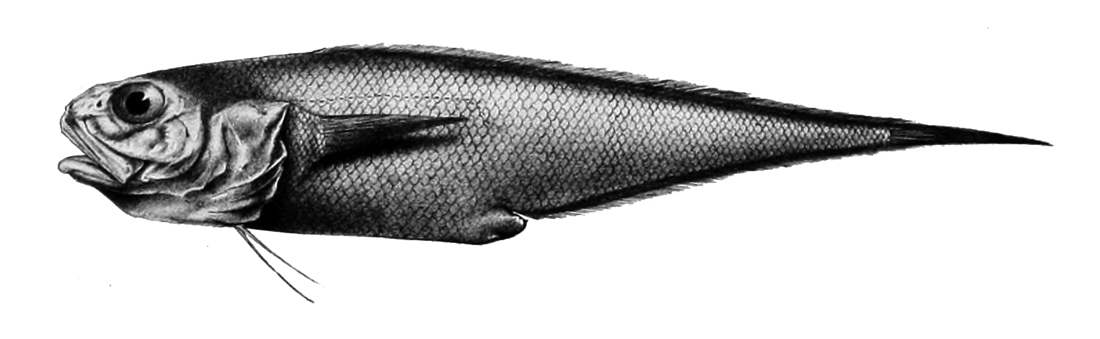
- Diplacanthopoma raniceps

Scientific classification
- Domain: Eukaryota
- Kingdom: Animalia
- Phylum: Chordata
- Class: Actinopterygii
- Order: Ophidiiformes
- Family: Bythitidae
- Subfamily: Bythitinae
- Genus: Diplacanthopoma; Günther, 1887

Type species
- Diplacanthopoma brachysoma Günther, 1887

= Diplacanthopoma =

Genus of fishes

Diplacanthopoma is a genus of viviparous brotulas.

== Species ==
There are currently nine recognized species in this genus:

- Diplacanthopoma alcockii Goode & T. H. Bean, 1896
- Diplacanthopoma brachysoma Günther, 1887
- Diplacanthopoma brunnea H. M. Smith & Radcliffe, 1913
- Diplacanthopoma japonicus (Steindachner & Döderlein (de), 1887)
- Diplacanthopoma jordani Garman, 1899
- Diplacanthopoma kreffti Cohen & J. G. Nielsen, 2002 (Deepbody cusk)
- Diplacanthopoma nigripinnis Gilchrist & von Bonde, 1924
- Diplacanthopoma raniceps Alcock, 1898
- Diplacanthopoma riversandersoni Alcock, 1895
