= Timorichthys disjunctus =

Scientific classification
- Kingdom: Animalia
- Phylum: Chordata
- Class: Actinopterygii
- Order: Ophidiiformes
- Family: Bythitidae
- Genus: Timorichthys
- Species: T. disjunctus

Binomial name
- Timorichthys disjunctus J. G. Nielsen & Schwarzhans, 2011

Species of fish

Timorichthys disjunctus is a species of viviparous brotula found in the Timor Sea where it occurs at depths of around 392 metres (1,286 ft). This species grows to a length of 3.9 centimetres (1.5 in) SL.
