= Brotulotaenia =

Scientific classification
- Kingdom: Animalia
- Phylum: Chordata
- Class: Actinopterygii
- Order: Ophidiiformes
- Family: Ophidiidae
- Subfamily: Brotulotaeniinae; Cohen & Nielsen, 1978
- Genus: Brotulotaenia; A. E. Parr, 1933

Type species
- Brotulotaenia nigra Parr, 1933

Genus of fishes

Brotulotaenia is a genus of cusk-eels. It is the only genus in the subfamily Brotulotaeniinae.

== Species ==
There are currently four recognized species in this genus:

- Brotulotaenia brevicauda Cohen, 1974
- Brotulotaenia crassa A. E. Parr, 1934 (Violet cusk eel)
- Brotulotaenia nielseni Cohen, 1974
- Brotulotaenia nigra A. E. Parr, 1933 (Dark cusk)
