= Thalassobathia =

Scientific classification
- Kingdom: Animalia
- Phylum: Chordata
- Class: Actinopterygii
- Order: Ophidiiformes
- Family: Bythitidae
- Subfamily: Bythitinae
- Genus: Thalassobathia; Cohen, 1963

Type species
- Thalassobathia pelagica Cohen, 1963

Genus of fishes

Thalassobathia is a genus of deep-sea viviparous brotulas.

== Species ==
There are currently two recognized species in this genus:

- Thalassobathia nelsoni R. S. Lee, 1974
- Thalassobathia pelagica Cohen, 1963
