= Grammonus opisthodon =

Scientific classification
- Kingdom: Animalia
- Phylum: Chordata
- Class: Actinopterygii
- Order: Ophidiiformes
- Family: Bythitidae
- Genus: Grammonus
- Species: G. opisthodon

Binomial name
- Grammonus opisthodon Smith, 1934

Synonyms
- Grammonoides opisthodon (Smith, 1934); Grammonous opisthodon Smith, 1934

South African fish species

Grammonus opisthodon, the bighead brotula, is a species of fish known from South Africa.

== Description ==
This fish has an eel-like body with a rounded head. It is dark brown in colour with small brown spots on the head. The dorsal, anal and caudal fins are translucent and continuous with many fine rays. They have no spiny rays. The largest known specimen was 5 cm (2.0 in) long.

== Distribution and habitat ==
This fish is known from two nearby sites off the coast of the Eastern Cape of South Africa. It has been found at a depth of 22 m (72 ft) at Port Alfred and the Storms River Mouth.

== Conservation ==
Only two specimens have been collected - one prior to 1934 and a second in the early 1980s.This species is currently listed as data deficient by the IUCN as very little is known about it.
