= Brotulotaenia nielseni =

Scientific classification
- Kingdom: Animalia
- Phylum: Chordata
- Class: Actinopterygii
- Order: Ophidiiformes
- Family: Ophidiidae
- Genus: Brotulotaenia
- Species: B. nielseni

Binomial name
- Brotulotaenia nielseni Cohen, 1974

Species of Actinopterygii

Brotulotaenia nielseni is a species of fish in the family Ophidiidae.
