= Luciobrotula corethromycter =

Scientific classification
- Kingdom: Animalia
- Phylum: Chordata
- Class: Actinopterygii
- Order: Ophidiiformes
- Family: Ophidiidae
- Genus: Luciobrotula
- Species: L. corethromycter

Binomial name
- Luciobrotula corethromycter Cohen, 1964

Species of Actinopterygii

Luciobrotula corethromycter is a species of fish in the family Ophidiidae.
