= Grammonus nagaredai =

Scientific classification
- Kingdom: Animalia
- Phylum: Chordata
- Class: Actinopterygii
- Order: Ophidiiformes
- Family: Bythitidae
- Genus: Grammonus
- Species: G. nagaredai

Binomial name
- Grammonus nagaredai Randall and Hughes, 2009

Species of fish

Grammonus nagaredai, or the Nagareda's viviparous brotula, is a species of viviparous brotula found in the Hawaiian Islands where it occurs at depths of around 5 metres (16 ft) to 10 metres (33 ft).

== Description ==
Grammonus nagaredai is similar to Grammonus ater from the Mediterranean Sea, but it differs from that species in being more robust. The head and body are brown in life, while the sensory papillae tend to be white.
