= Cataetyx laticeps =

Conservation status
- Least Concern (IUCN 3.1)

Scientific classification
- Domain: Eukaryota
- Kingdom: Animalia
- Phylum: Chordata
- Class: Actinopterygii
- Order: Ophidiiformes
- Family: Bythitidae
- Genus: Cataetyx
- Species: C. laticeps

Binomial name
- Cataetyx laticeps (Koefoed, 1927)

Synonyms
- Cataetyx memorabilis Meyer-Rochow, 1970

Species of fish

Cataetyx laticeps is a species of fish in the family Bythitidae (viviparous brotulas).

== Description ==
Cataetyx laticeps is dark brown in colour, and has a broad head, as indicated by the specific name laticeps, with a maximum length of 65 cm (26 in) and eyes on the dorsolateral. It has 98–107 dorsal soft rays, 75–83 anal soft rays, 8 branchiostegal rays and 60 or 61 vertebrae.

== Habitat ==
Cataetyx laticeps is benthopelagic or bathydemersal, living at depths of 500–2,400 m (1,600–7,900 ft). It lives in the Atlantic Ocean, Gulf of Mexico and Mediterranean Sea.

== Behaviour ==
Cataetyx laticeps reproduces viviparously and is an obligate lecithotrophic live-bearer.
