= Brotulotaenia brevicauda =

Conservation status
- Least Concern (IUCN 3.1)

Scientific classification
- Kingdom: Animalia
- Phylum: Chordata
- Class: Actinopterygii
- Order: Ophidiiformes
- Family: Ophidiidae
- Genus: Brotulotaenia
- Species: B. brevicauda

Binomial name
- Brotulotaenia brevicauda Cohen, 1974

Species of fish

Brotulotaenia brevicauda is a benthopelagic marine fish species in the family Ophidiidae. This totally black fish is usually found in the Atlantic Ocean but it has also been reported in the Indian. B. brevicauda lives in deep water and grows up to 32 cm in length. It is also occasionally known as the Short-tail cusk-eel.

== Description ==
B. brevicauda can be differentiated from other cusk eels in that it's operculum lacks a spine. Many cusk-eels also have a patch of teeth in the middle of the basibranchial region, and while B. brevicauda lacks this feature, its gill-rakers form a number of tooth-bearing tubercules. The otoliths of this species are also very small and rounded.

In the rest of the skeleton, B. brevicauda scales are small, prickle-like, and are not imbricated. The dorsal fin lacks spines but has 79-84 rays. Similarly, the anal fin lacks spines but has 58-64 rays. In total this species has 63-66 vertebrae, 12-15 of which are in the pre-caudal region.

== Distribution and habitat ==
In the Eastern Atlantic Ocean, B. brevicauda is known from the waters near Portugal, as well as one record from an area northwest of Spain as well as near the Azores. In the Western Atlantic, it has been found near Bermuda, in the Gulf of Mexico and in the Caribbean Sea, and may rarely appear near the Flemish Cap region. B. brevicauda is also found in both the eastern and western Indian Oceans.

== See also ==
- Cusk-eel
