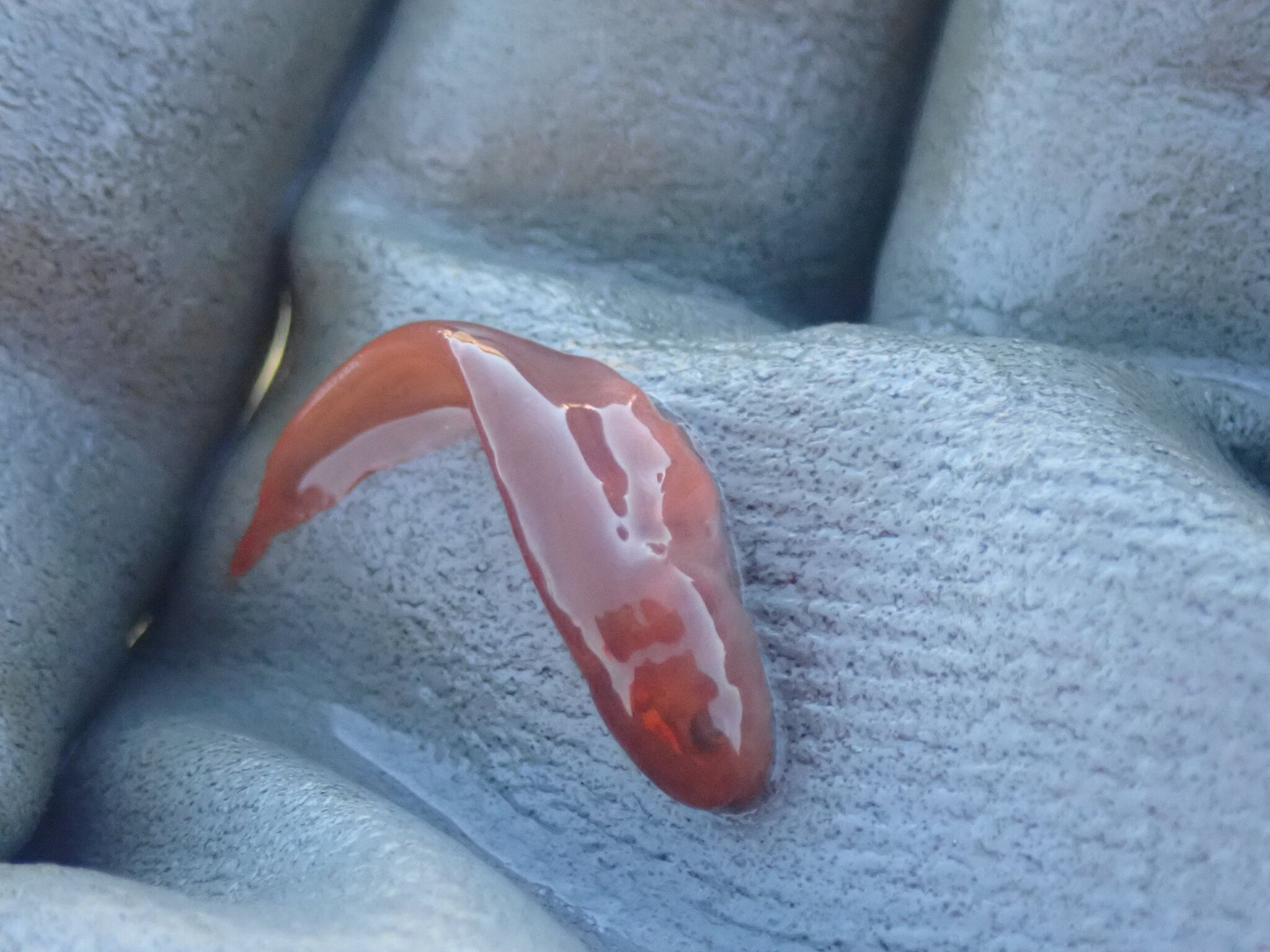

Conservation status
- Least Concern (IUCN 3.1)

Scientific classification
- Kingdom: Animalia
- Phylum: Chordata
- Class: Actinopterygii
- Order: Ophidiiformes
- Family: Bythitidae
- Subfamily: Brosmophycinae
- Tribe: Brosmophycini
- Genus: Brosmodorsalis
- Species: B. persicinus

Binomial name
- Brosmodorsalis persicinus Paulin & C. D. Roberts, 1989

= Pink brotula =

Species of fish

The pink brotula, Brosmodorsalis persicinus, is a species of viviparous brotula, the only member of the genus Brosmodorsalis. It is found along the northeast coast of the North Island of New Zealand from shallow depths to about 17 metres (56 ft). Their length is up to 6 centimetres (2.4 in).
