= Lucifuga teresinarum =

Conservation status
- Vulnerable (IUCN 2.3)

Scientific classification
- Kingdom: Animalia
- Phylum: Chordata
- Class: Actinopterygii
- Order: Ophidiiformes
- Family: Bythitidae
- Genus: Lucifuga
- Species: L. teresinarum

Binomial name
- Lucifuga teresinarum Díaz Pérez, 1988

Species of fish

Lucifuga teresinarum is a species of cavefish in the family Bythitidae. It is endemic to Cuba.

== Size ==
This species reaches a length of 8.3 cm (3.3 in).

== Etymology ==
The fish is named for two members of the faculty at the Universidad de la Habana and colleagues of the author. Dr Maria Teresa del Valle Portilla, who is a physician and a full professor, and Maria Teresita de la Hoz Gonzalez, who is a biologist.
