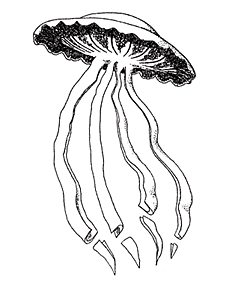
- Illustration of Stygiomedusa gigantea

Scientific classification
- Kingdom: Animalia
- Phylum: Cnidaria
- Class: Scyphozoa
- Order: Semaeostomeae
- Family: Ulmaridae
- Genus: Stygiomedusa; Russell, 1959
- Species: S. gigantea

Binomial name
- Stygiomedusa gigantea (Browne, 1910)

Synonyms
- Diplulmaris gigantea; Stygiomedusa fabulosa; Stygiomedusa stauchi

= Stygiomedusa =

Species of jellyfish

Stygiomedusa gigantea, (Note: from Ancient Greek Στύγιος (Stúgios) 'Stygian,', Μέδουσα (Médousa) 'Medusa,' and γιγάντεια (gigánteia) 'gigantic') commonly known as the giant phantom jelly, is the only known species in the monotypic genus of deep sea jellyfish, Stygiomedusa. It is in the Ulmaridae family. With only around 118 sightings in 110 years, it is a jellyfish that is rarely seen, but believed to be widespread throughout the world, with the exception of the Arctic Ocean.

The Monterey Bay Aquarium Research Institute's remotely operated underwater vehicles have only sighted the jelly 27 times in 27 years. A study conducted by the Journal of the Marine Biological Association of the United Kingdom, focusing on four Stygiomedusa gigantea present in the Gulf of Mexico, revealed information regarding the wider distribution of this species. S. gigantea is thought to be one of the largest invertebrate predators in the ecosystem. It is commonly found in the ocean's midnight zone, and twilight zone usually at depths of 6,665 m (21,867 ft).

== Description ==
S. gigantea has an umbrella-shaped bell that can grow up to 1 m (3 1/4 ft). The bell's pliant tissue allows for the jellyfish to stretch 4 to 5 times its size, presumably to engulf its prey. Their four arms have a "paddle-like" or "kite-like" shape and can grow up to 10 m (33 ft) in length. The arms grow in a "V" shape transversely, with a wider base and tapering towards the ends. They do not have any stinging tentacles and instead use their arms to trap and engulf their prey which consists of plankton and small fish. From Browne's analysis of a collected S. gigantea, their jelly appears a red-orange color only when there is visible light. As light does not penetrate the deep ocean where they dwell, they may appear "invisible" or glow orange very faintly in their surroundings, depending on the depth of the water.

Their bodies being made of either spongy tissue or jelly allows the species to withstand the enormous deep ocean pressure of 40 MPa (390 atm; 5,800 psi). The circular stomach contains canals that connect to the surface of the sub-umbrella. It is inferred that the lower stomach is thick to ensure the species has the strength to carry their long arms. Its four genital openings are also small to avoid weakening the stomach. Since there are no gastric pouches nor radial canals, the jellyfish was determined to be a part of the Ulmaridae family.

== Sightings ==
Stygiomedusa swimming near the Melchior Islands as seen from Viking submersible "Ringo" in December 2023.

Although Stygiomedusa is not native to the Antarctic Ocean, there have been sightings of the jellyfish in the Antarctic Ocean with the help of submersibles.

Daniel M. Moore, a marine biologist with Exeter University in the UK and chief scientist for Viking Cruises, states that the reason Antarctic waters below 50 m (160 ft) haven't yet been well explored is that they are so difficult and expensive to reach. However, the frequent encounters with this animal are from tourism expeditions in the Antarctic that are increasingly offering personal submersibles for guests to take photos. This leads to the sighting of the giant phantom jellyfish hundreds of metres underwater off the coast of Antarctica's Rongé Island.

There have been observations of the rarely encountered Stygiomedusa gigantea at depths of 80–280 m (260–920 ft), in the mesopelagic and lower epipelagic zones around the Antarctic Peninsula coastal waters. The Norwegian Polar Institute and an international peer-reviewed journal called Polar Research, which corresponds with Daniel M. Moore of Viking Expeditions, found Stygiomedusa gigantea in the Antarctic Peninsula at Georges Point, Rongé Island, Fournier Bay, Anvers Island, and Paradise Harbour.

Giant phantom jellyfish live in every ocean except for the Arctic Ocean. However, because they typically swim deep below the surface, they are hardly seen by humans. Daniel M. Moore noted that one potential explanation for the sightings is that the jellyfish may swim higher up to expose themselves to ultraviolet radiation, which will rid them of parasites. Another hypothesis is that the upwelling deep water found around the Antarctic continent just carries them upward.

== Behavior ==
Known to be one of the largest invertebrate predators in the deep sea, the giant phantom jellyfish's typical prey consists of plankton and small fish. The S. gigantea tends to be more dominant in locations with a low productivity system, which in turn deters other predatory organisms, like fish, to high productivity systems (coastal, upwelling zones). However, the jellyfish remains an important predator for the deep sea, often competing with squids and whales.

Larger S. gigantea have also been observed to be in the immediate vicinity of hydrothermal vents where large proportions of zooplankton are abundant. This is in mesopelagic and bathypelagic depths. The further away from hydrothermal vents, the smaller the medusae are—indicating that zooplankton are an important resource for the species. Due to this, the medusae are well off during early spring to early summer when zooplankton biomass is enhanced.

Evidence has been collected to support the first-ever documented symbiotic relationship for an ophidiiform fish, Thalassobathia pelagica. Scientists have observed that the large umbrella-shaped bell of S. gigantea provides food and shelter for T. pelagica, while the fish aids the giant phantom jelly by removing parasites. The S. gigantea's jelly providing shelter for T. pelagica is essential for the fish, considering the lack of shelter resources at such extreme ocean depths. Studies to further support this symbiotic relationship have shown that the two species reassociate with one another even if separated. It was inferred that T. pelagica is able to find its way back to the giant phantom jelly due to neuromasts that increase the sensitivity of low-frequency water movements—which the bell of the jellyfish emits.

== Discovery ==
The first S. gigantea specimen, weighing in at forty kilograms (ninety pounds), was collected in 1899, but it was not recognized as a species until 1959. Despite having discovered only 118 individuals within 110 years (1899–2009), gelatinous mucus from the medusa have been found covering vents, indicating they may travel in swarms. Similar large jelly Schyphomedusae were observed traveling in swarms off the West coast of North America. However, there are instances in which the species is spotted alone, such as the S. gigantea identified at a depth of 1,200 m (3,900 ft) in the San Clemente Basin just off of California.

The giant phantom jelly occurs all around the world with the exception of the Arctic Ocean. They are typically found 61°N–75°S and 135°W–153°E. In areas of high latitude in the Southern ocean, the depth at which the species may be found are at the mesopelagic and epipelagic levels. However, in areas of mid to low latitude, the species are typically found at bathypelagic and mesopelagic levels. This is due to the variability of the ocean's temperature and light distribution.

== Reproduction ==
Determining the reproduction of the S. gigantea is difficult considering how rare sightings are. It has been noted that young captured S. gigantea looked like an exact miniature of the adult. However, researchers have analyzed the jellyfish's structure and anatomy enough to understand how it may reproduce.

The S. gigantea has four brood chambers that protrude into the stomach in folded narrow ridges and epithelium that covers the gastric side. Its lower periphery has frills along the folds, creating a band about 20 mm (3/4 in) high. Above this band, there is a germinal line that forms a shallow groove with different epithelial cells that are more cubical in shape with large, rounded nuclei. Irregular placement of the cells in small pits (small clumps of cells, similar to cyst) along the germinal line produce a multiplication of epithelial cells that create a deep invagination. This is the first stage leading to the reproduction of S. gigantea. The cyst grows with a pointed end on the subumbrella side. As its size increases, it pushes out the brood chamber wall and into the cavity of the chamber. Simultaneously on the opposite end, two outgrowths develop horizontally, making the cyst into a "T" shape. This protrudes more and more as size increases, taking the brood chamber with it. Eventually, a thin membrane forms and the cyst enters the stomach cavity.

Within the cyst, a scyphistoma—a single developing medusa—forms and is now called a chorion. Once the chorion grows into about 2 mm long and 2–3 mm in diameter with teat-shaped distal ends (which are basal outgrowths), it begins to be pushed out of the chamber. Within the chorion capsule, differentiation and formation begins. The inner epithelial wall is directly from the parent tissue and is pocketed into its distal tips that will eventually become the S. gigantea's arms. As the "baby" medusa grows, it takes the shape of the capsule.

In order to escape, the well-developed "baby" medusa will detach from the subumbrella wall where it was already slightly protruding. It then exits through the gastric cavity and out the parent's mouth.

The baby medusa soon become free-swimming planules, then polyps or scyphistomae that reproduce asexually through budding or podocysts. These are what become larval medusae that feed on plankton. Eventually, it will grow into the size of an adult. It is inferred that reproduction of S. gigantea is continuous with one parent estimated to produce fifty to one hundred medusa.
