= Dermatopsoides =

Scientific classification
- Kingdom: Animalia
- Phylum: Chordata
- Class: Actinopterygii
- Order: Ophidiiformes
- Family: Bythitidae
- Tribe: Dinematichthyini
- Genus: Dermatopsoides; J. L. B. Smith, 1948

Type species
- Dermatopsis kasougae Smith, 1943

Genus of fishes

Dermatopsoides is a genus of viviparous brotulas.

== Species ==
There are currently four recognized species in this genus:

- Dermatopsoides andersoni Møller & Schwarzhans, 2006 (Anderson's mudbrotula)
- Dermatopsoides kasougae (J. L. B. Smith, 1943) (Orange brotula)
- Dermatopsoides morrisonae Møller & Schwarzhans, 2006 (Morrison's mudbrotula)
- Dermatopsoides talboti Cohen, 1966 (Lesser orange brotula)
