= Ogilbia suarezae =

Conservation status
- Least Concern (IUCN 3.1)

Scientific classification
- Kingdom: Animalia
- Phylum: Chordata
- Class: Actinopterygii
- Division: Teleostei
- Order: Ophidiiformes
- Family: Bythitidae
- Genus: Ogilbia
- Species: O. suarezae

Binomial name
- Ogilbia suarezae Møller, Schwarzhans & J. G. Nielsen, 2005

Species of fish

Ogilbia suarezae is a species of fish of the genus Ogilbia found in the shallows of the Caribbean Sea. It is yellowish in color and is livebearing.

== Etymology ==
It was named in honor of Susan Suarez, a professor at Cornell University, in recognition of her careful study of the reproductive biology of the related fish Ogilbia cayorum.
