= Ogilbichthys =

Scientific classification
- Kingdom: Animalia
- Phylum: Chordata
- Class: Actinopterygii
- Order: Ophidiiformes
- Family: Bythitidae
- Tribe: Dinematichthyini
- Genus: Ogilbichthys; Møller, Schwarzhans & J. G. Nielsen, 2004

Type species
- Ogilbichthys longimanus Møller, Schwarzhans & Nielsen 2004

Genus of fishes

Ogilbichthys is a genus of viviparous brotulas found in the central-western Atlantic Ocean and the Caribbean Sea. The generic name refers to the resemblance of these fish to those in the genus Ogilbia, a name honours the Australian naturalist James Douglas Ogilby (1853-1925), combined with ichthys which means "fish" in Greek.

== Species ==
There are currently seven recognized species in this genus:

- Ogilbichthys ferocis Møller, Schwarzhans & J. G. Nielsen, 2004 (Ferocious coralbrotula)
- Ogilbichthys haitiensis Møller, Schwarzhans & J. G. Nielsen, 2004 (Haiti coralbrotula)
- Ogilbichthys kakuki Møller, Schwarzhans & J. G. Nielsen, 2004 (Kakuk's coralbrotula)
- Ogilbichthys longimanus Møller, Schwarzhans & J. G. Nielsen, 2004 (Long-finned coralbrotula)
- Ogilbichthys microphthalmus Møller, Schwarzhans & J. G. Nielsen, 2004 (Small-eyed coralbrotula)
- Ogilbichthys puertoricoensis Møller, Schwarzhans & J. G. Nielsen, 2004 (Puerto Rican coralbrotula)
- Ogilbichthys tobagoensis Møller, Schwarzhans & J. G. Nielsen, 2004 (Tobagonian coralbrotula)
