= Dermatopsis greenfieldi =

Greenfield's mudbrotula

Scientific classification
- Kingdom: Animalia
- Phylum: Chordata
- Class: Actinopterygii
- Order: Ophidiiformes
- Family: Bythitidae
- Genus: Dermatopsis
- Species: D. greenfieldi

Binomial name
- Dermatopsis greenfieldi Møller & Schwarzhans, 2006

Species of fish

Dermatopsis greenfieldi, also known as Greenfield's mudbrotula, is a species of viviparous brotula found in reefs around Fiji and the central Pacific, at a depth of between 1 and 10 meters. It grows up to 5.3 cm in length.
