= Timorichthys =

Scientific classification
- Kingdom: Animalia
- Phylum: Chordata
- Class: Actinopterygii
- Order: Ophidiiformes
- Family: Bythitidae
- Subfamily: Bythitinae
- Genus: Timorichthys; J. G. Nielsen & Schwarzhans, 2011

Type species
- Timorichthys disjunctus J. G. Nielsen & Schwarzhans, 2011

Genus of fishes

Timorichthys is a genus of viviparous brotulas so far known from the East China Sea and the Timor Sea.

== Species ==
There are currently two recognized species in this genus:

- Timorichthys angustus J. G. Nielsen, Okamoto & Schwarzhans, 2013
- Timorichthys disjunctus J. G. Nielsen & Schwarzhans, 2011
