= Alionematichthys =

Scientific classification
- Kingdom: Animalia
- Phylum: Chordata
- Class: Actinopterygii
- Order: Ophidiiformes
- Family: Bythitidae
- Tribe: Dinematichthyini
- Genus: Alionematichthys; Møller & Schwarzhans, 2008

Type species
- Dinematichthys riukiuensis Aoyagi, 1954

Genus of fishes

Alionematichthys is a genus of viviparous brotulas.

== Species ==
There are currently 11 recognized species in this genus:

- Alionematichthys ceylonensis Møller & Schwarzhans, 2008
- Alionematichthys crassiceps Møller & Schwarzhans, 2008
- Alionematichthys minyomma (Sedor & Cohen, 1987)
- Alionematichthys phuketensis Møller & Schwarzhans, 2008
- Alionematichthys piger (Alcock, 1890)
- Alionematichthys plicatosurculus Møller & Schwarzhans, 2008
- Alionematichthys riukiuensis (Aoyagi, 1954) (Bigeye cusk)
- Alionematichthys samoaensis Møller & Schwarzhans, 2008
- Alionematichthys shinoharai Møller & Schwarzhans, 2008
- Alionematichthys suluensis Møller & Schwarzhans, 2008
- Alionematichthys winterbottomi Møller & Schwarzhans, 2008
