= Tuamotuichthys =

Scientific classification
- Kingdom: Animalia
- Phylum: Chordata
- Class: Actinopterygii
- Order: Ophidiiformes
- Family: Bythitidae
- Subfamily: Bythitinae
- Genus: Tuamotuichthys; Møller, Schwarzhans & J. G. Nielsen, 2004

Type species
- Tuamotuichthys bispinosus Møller, Schwarzhans & Nielsen, 2004

Genus of fishes

Tuamotuichthys is a genus of viviparous brotula that lives in the Pacific Ocean.

== Species ==
There are currently three recognized species in this genus:

- Tuamotuichthys bispinosus Møller, Schwarzhans & J. G. Nielsen, 2004 (Two-spined slopebrotula)
- Tuamotuichthys marshallensis J. G. Nielsen, Schwarzhans, Møller & J. E. Randall, 2006 (Marshall slopebrotula)
- Tuamotuichthys schwarzhansi J. G. Nielsen & Møller, 2008
