= Brotulotaenia crassa =

Conservation status
- Least Concern (IUCN 3.1)

Scientific classification
- Kingdom: Animalia
- Phylum: Chordata
- Class: Actinopterygii
- Order: Ophidiiformes
- Family: Ophidiidae
- Genus: Brotulotaenia
- Species: B. crassa

Binomial name
- Brotulotaenia crassa Parr, 1934

Species of Actinopterygii

Brotulotaenia crassa, also known as violet cuskeel, violet cusk, or blue cusk eel, is a species of fish in the family Ophidiidae. It occurs in the central and northern Atlantic Ocean, southern Indian Ocean, and southwestern Pacific Ocean at depths of 250–800 m (820–2,620 ft)}. It is uncommon. It can grow to 86 cm (34 in) standard length.
