= Spinyhead cusk =

Conservation status
- Data Deficient (IUCN 3.1)

Scientific classification
- Kingdom: Animalia
- Phylum: Chordata
- Class: Actinopterygii
- Order: Ophidiiformes
- Family: Bythitidae
- Subfamily: Bythitinae
- Genus: Hastatobythites
- Species: H. arafurensis

Binomial name
- Hastatobythites arafurensis Machida, 1997

Species of fish

The spinyhead cusk (Hastatobythites arafurensis) is a species of viviparous brotula found in the western Pacific Ocean where it occurs from the Arafura Sea to New South Wales, Australia. It is found at depths of from 146 to 850 metres (479 to 2,789 ft). This species grows to a length of 9 centimetres (3.5 in) SL.
