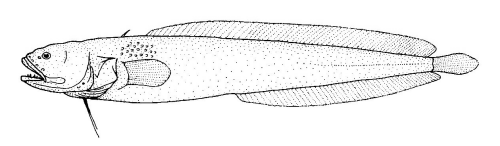
- Drawing by Dr Tony Ayling

Scientific classification
- Kingdom: Animalia
- Phylum: Chordata
- Class: Actinopterygii
- Order: Ophidiiformes
- Family: Bythitidae
- Genus: Dermatopsis
- Species: D. macrodon

Binomial name
- Dermatopsis macrodon J. D. Ogilby, 1896

= Fleshfish =

Species of fish

The fleshfish (Dermatopsis macrodon), also known as the eastern yellow blindfish, is a species of viviparous brotula found in reefs of southern Australia and around New Zealand. This species grows to a length of 10 centimetres (3.9 in) TL.
