= Mascarenichthys heemstrai =

Scientific classification
- Kingdom: Animalia
- Phylum: Chordata
- Class: Actinopterygii
- Order: Ophidiiformes
- Family: Bythitidae
- Genus: Mascarenichthys
- Species: M. heemstrai

Binomial name
- Mascarenichthys heemstrai Schwarzhans & Møller, 2007

Species of fish

Mascarenichthys heemstrai is a ray-finned fish species from the family of Bythitidae in the genus of Mascarenichthys. The scientific name of the species was first published in 2007 by Schwarzhans & Møller, It was named after Phil Heemstra, a notable ichthyologist.
