= Thermichthys hollisi =

Conservation status
- Data Deficient (IUCN 3.1)

Scientific classification
- Kingdom: Animalia
- Phylum: Chordata
- Class: Actinopterygii
- Order: Ophidiiformes
- Family: Bythitidae
- Subfamily: Bythitinae
- Genus: Thermichthys; J. G. Nielsen & Cohen, 2005
- Species: T. hollisi

Binomial name
- Thermichthys hollisi (Cohen, Rosenblatt & Moser, 1990)

Synonyms
- Bythites hollisi

Species of fish

Thermichthys hollisi is a species of viviparous brotula found in the Galapagos Rift Zone at depths of 2,500 metres (8,200 ft) around thermal vents. This species is the only known member of its genus. The specific name honours the submersible pilot Raplph Hollis who captured specimens of this fish.
