= Acarobythites =

Scientific classification
- Kingdom: Animalia
- Phylum: Chordata
- Class: Actinopterygii
- Division: Teleostei
- Order: Ophidiiformes
- Family: Bythitidae
- Subfamily: Bythitinae
- Genus: Acarobythites
- Species: A. larsonae

Binomial name
- Acarobythites larsonae Machida, 2000

Genus of fishes

Acarobythites larsonae, or Larson's cusk, is a species of viviparous brotula fish only known from reefs off the coast of the Northern Territory, Australia. This species grows to a length of 2.5 centimetres (0.98 in) SL. This species is the only known member of genus Acarobythites. The specific name and common name both honour the curator of fishes at the Museum and Art Gallery of the Northern Territory in Darwin, Northern Territory, Helen Larson who sent speciemsn of fish, especially Ophidiiformes, to the describer Yoshiko Machida for him to study.
