= Luciobrotula bartschi =

Scientific classification
- Kingdom: Animalia
- Phylum: Chordata
- Class: Actinopterygii
- Order: Ophidiiformes
- Family: Ophidiidae
- Genus: Luciobrotula
- Species: L. bartschi

Binomial name
- Luciobrotula bartschi Smith & Radcliffe, 1913

Species of Actinopterygii

Luciobrotula bartschi is a species of fish in the family Ophidiidae.
