= Lucifuga dentata =

Conservation status
- Endangered (IUCN 3.1)

Scientific classification
- Kingdom: Animalia
- Phylum: Chordata
- Class: Actinopterygii
- Order: Ophidiiformes
- Family: Bythitidae
- Genus: Lucifuga
- Species: L. dentata

Binomial name
- Lucifuga dentata Poey, 1858

Synonyms
- Lucifuga dentatus Poey, 1858 (misspelling); Stygicola dentata (Poey, 1858) (misspelling); Stygicola dentatus (Poey, 1858)

Species of fish

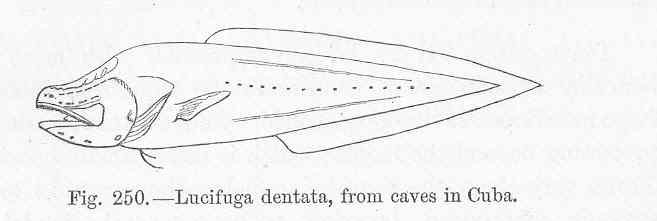
Lucifuga dentata, from caves in Cuba

Lucifuga dentata is a species of fish in the family Bythitidae. It is endemic to Cuba.
