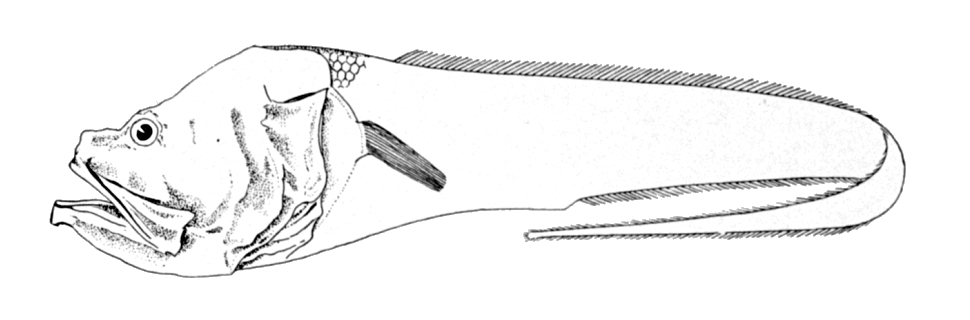
- H. simum

Scientific classification
- Kingdom: Animalia
- Phylum: Chordata
- Class: Actinopterygii
- Order: Ophidiiformes
- Family: Bythitidae
- Subfamily: Bythitinae
- Genus: Hephthocara; Alcock, 1892

Type species
- Hephthocara simum Alcock, 1892

= Hephthocara =

Genus of fishes

Hephthocara is a small genus of Indo-Pacific viviparous brotula.

== Species ==
There are currently two recognized species in this genus:

- Hephthocara crassiceps H. M. Smith & Radcliffe, 1913
- Hephthocara simum Alcock, 1892
