= Pseudonus =

Scientific classification
- Kingdom: Animalia
- Phylum: Chordata
- Class: Actinopterygii
- Order: Ophidiiformes
- Family: Bythitidae
- Subfamily: Bythitinae
- Genus: Pseudonus; Garman, 1899

Type species
- Pseudonus acutus Garman, 1899

Genus of fishes

Pseudonus is a genus of viviparous brotulas.

== Species ==
There are currently two recognized species in this genus:

- Pseudonus acutus Garman, 1899
- Pseudonus squamiceps (Lloyd, 1907)
