= Paradiancistrus christmasensis =

Christmas viviparous brotula

Scientific classification
- Kingdom: Animalia
- Phylum: Chordata
- Class: Actinopterygii
- Order: Ophidiiformes
- Family: Bythitidae
- Genus: Paradiancistrus
- Species: P. christmasensis

Binomial name
- Paradiancistrus christmasensis Schwarzhans & Møller, 2011

Species of fish

Paradiancistrus christmasensis, commonly known as the Christmas viviparous brotula, is a species of viviparous brotula native to the waters around Christmas Island and the south-eastern Indian Ocean. This species grows to a length of 6.8 centimetres (2.7 in) SL.
