= Brosmophyciops =

Conservation status
- Least Concern (IUCN 3.1)

Scientific classification
- Kingdom: Animalia
- Phylum: Chordata
- Class: Actinopterygii
- Order: Ophidiiformes
- Family: Bythitidae
- Subfamily: Brosmophycinae
- Genus: Brosmophyciops; Schultz, 1960
- Species: B. pautzkei

Binomial name
- Brosmophyciops pautzkei L. P. Schultz, 1960

Genus of fishes

Brosmophyciops pautzkei, the slimy cuskeel or free-tailed reef brotula, is a species of viviparous brotulas found in tropical reefs of the Indian and Pacific Oceans. This species grows to 7 cm (2.8 in) total length. This species is the only known member of its genus. The specific name honours Clarence F. Pautzke, who was a former student of the describer of this species who went on to become the chief biologist in the Department of Game of Washington state and who was present on Bikini Atoll in 1946 and 1947 when the type specimen was collected.

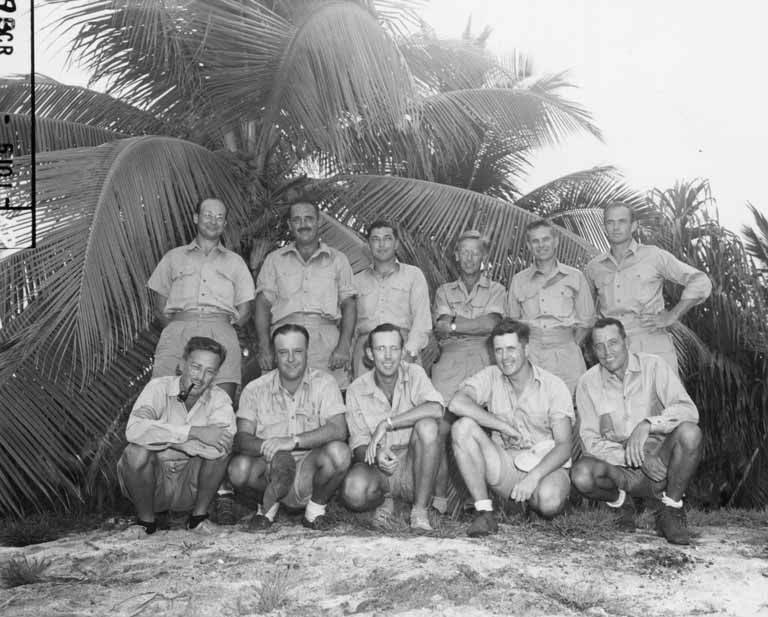
Clarence F. Pautzke (standing, 2nd from left) at the Bikini Atoll Radiological Survey, summer 1947
