= Lapitaichthys =

Scientific classification
- Kingdom: Animalia
- Phylum: Chordata
- Class: Actinopterygii
- Division: Teleostei
- Order: Ophidiiformes
- Family: Bythitidae
- Tribe: Dinematichthyini
- Genus: Lapitaichthys
- Species: L. frickei

Binomial name
- Lapitaichthys frickei Schwarzhans & Møller, 2007

Species of fish

Lapitaichthys frickei is a species of viviparous brotula found on reefs around New Caledonia. This species grows to a length of 4.9 centimetres (1.9 in) SL. This species is the only known member of its genus. The specific name refers to the ichthyologist Ronald Fricke of the Staatliches Museum für Naturkunde Stuttgart while the generic name is derived from a mishearing of the local word xaapeta which means "to dig a hole" and the Greek ichthys which means "fish".
