= Luciobrotula lineata =

Scientific classification
- Kingdom: Animalia
- Phylum: Chordata
- Class: Actinopterygii
- Order: Ophidiiformes
- Family: Ophidiidae
- Genus: Luciobrotula
- Species: L. lineata

Binomial name
- Luciobrotula lineata (Gosline, 1954)

Species of fish

Luciobrotula lineata is a species of fish in the family Ophidiidae.
