= Luciobrotula brasiliensis =

Scientific classification
- Domain: Eukaryota
- Kingdom: Animalia
- Phylum: Chordata
- Class: Actinopterygii
- Order: Ophidiiformes
- Family: Ophidiidae
- Genus: Luciobrotula
- Species: L. brasiliensis

Binomial name
- Luciobrotula brasiliensis Nielsen, 2009

Species of Actinopterygii

Luciobrotula brasiliensis is a species of fish in the family Ophidiidae.
