= Brotulotaenia nigra =

Scientific classification
- Domain: Eukaryota
- Kingdom: Animalia
- Phylum: Chordata
- Class: Actinopterygii
- Order: Ophidiiformes
- Family: Ophidiidae
- Genus: Brotulotaenia
- Species: B. nigra

Binomial name
- Brotulotaenia nigra Parr, 1933

Species of Actinopterygii

Brotulotaenia nigra is a species of fish in the family Ophidiidae.
