= Anacanthobythites =

Scientific classification
- Kingdom: Animalia
- Phylum: Chordata
- Class: Actinopterygii
- Order: Ophidiiformes
- Family: Bythitidae
- Subfamily: Bythitinae
- Genus: Anacanthobythites; M. E. Anderson, 2008

Type species
- Anacanthobythites platycephalus Anderson 2008

Genus of fishes

Anacanthobythites is a genus of viviparous brotulas both found in the eastern Indian Ocean.

== Species ==
There are currently two recognized species in this genus:

- Anacanthobythites platycephalus M. E. Anderson, 2008
- Anacanthobythites tasmaniensis M. E. Anderson, 2008
