= Dipulus hutchinsi =

Scientific classification
- Kingdom: Animalia
- Phylum: Chordata
- Class: Actinopterygii
- Order: Ophidiiformes
- Family: Bythitidae
- Genus: Dipulus
- Species: D. hutchinsi

Binomial name
- Dipulus hutchinsi Møller & Schwarzhans, 2006

Species of fish

Dipulus hutchinsi, commonly known as the Hutchins mudbrotula, is a species of viviparous brotula. It is found along the coast of Western Australia in reefs, at depths of between 10 and 60 meters. It is named after Dr Barry Hutchins, a curator of fish at the Western Australian Museum.

== Description ==
D. hutchinsi is nocturnal and has a very elongated body, growing up to 12 cm in length. It appears a uniform yellow in colour, fading to a light brown when preserved.
