= Black brotula =

Conservation status
- Least Concern (IUCN 3.1)

Scientific classification
- Kingdom: Animalia
- Phylum: Chordata
- Class: Actinopterygii
- Order: Ophidiiformes
- Family: Bythitidae
- Subfamily: Bythitinae
- Genus: Stygnobrotula
- Species: S. latebricola

Binomial name
- Stygnobrotula latebricola J. E. Böhlke, 1957

Synonyms
- Eutyx tumidirostris Boeseman, 1960

Species of fish

The black brotula (Stygnobrotula latebricola), also known as the black widow, is a species of viviparous brotula found in reefs of the western Atlantic Ocean where it occurs from the Bahamas in the north southwards to Brazil. This species grows to a length of 7.5 centimetres (3.0 in) TL. This species is the only known member of its genus.
