= Littoral cusk =

Conservation status
- Least Concern (IUCN 3.1)

Scientific classification
- Kingdom: Animalia
- Phylum: Chordata
- Class: Actinopterygii
- Order: Ophidiiformes
- Family: Bythitidae
- Subfamily: Brosmophycinae
- Tribe: Dinematichthyini
- Genus: Monothrix
- Species: M. polylepis

Binomial name
- Monothrix polylepis J. D. Ogilby, 1897

Species of fish

The Littoral cusk (Monothrix polylepis) is a species of viviparous brotula known from shallow reefs off the coast of eastern Australia. This species grows to a length of 5 centimetres (2.0 in) SL. This is currently the only known species in its genus.
