= Mascarenichthys =

Scientific classification
- Kingdom: Animalia
- Phylum: Chordata
- Class: Actinopterygii
- Order: Ophidiiformes
- Family: Bythitidae
- Tribe: Dinematichthyini
- Genus: Mascarenichthys; Schwarzhans & Møller, 2007

Type species
- Mascarenichthys heemstrai Schwarzhans & Møller, 2007

Genus of fishes

Mascarenichthys is a genus of viviparous brotulas. They have mostly been collected from the region of Mascarene Plateau in the Indian Ocean and this is referred to in their generic name.

== Species ==
There are currently three recognized species in this genus:

- Mascarenichthys heemstrai Schwarzhans & Møller, 2007
- Mascarenichthys microphthalmus Schwarzhans & Møller, 2007
- Mascarenichthys remotus Schwarzhans & Møller, 2011
