= Dipulus =

Scientific classification
- Domain: Eukaryota
- Kingdom: Animalia
- Phylum: Chordata
- Class: Actinopterygii
- Order: Ophidiiformes
- Family: Bythitidae
- Tribe: Dinematichthyini
- Genus: Dipulus; Waite, 1905

Type species
- Dipulus caecus Waite, 1905.

Genus of fishes

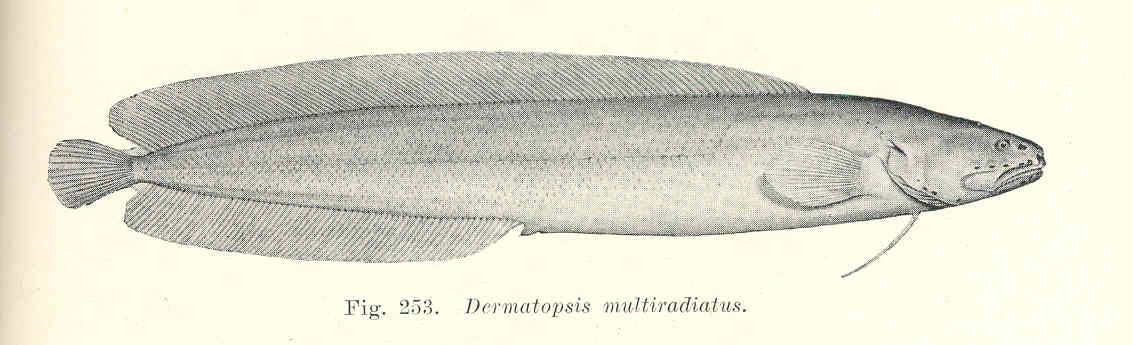

Dipulus is a genus of viviparous brotulas.

== Species ==
There are currently four recognized species in this genus:

- Dipulus caecus Waite, 1905 (Orange eelpout)
- Dipulus hutchinsi Møller & Schwarzhans, 2006 (Hutchin's mudbrotula)
- Dipulus multiradiatus (McCulloch & Waite, 1918) (Slender blindfish)
- Dipulus norfolkanus Machida, 1993
