= Diancistrus =

Scientific classification
- Kingdom: Animalia
- Phylum: Chordata
- Class: Actinopterygii
- Division: Teleostei
- Order: Ophidiiformes
- Family: Bythitidae
- Tribe: Dinematichthyini
- Genus: Diancistrus; Ogilby, 1899

Type species
- Diancistrus longifilis Ogilby, 1899

Synonyms
- Brotulina Fowler, 1946; Calcarbrotula Fowler, 1946; Parabrosmolus Machida, 1996

Genus of fishes

Diancistrus is a genus of viviparous brotulas.

== Species ==
There are currently 28 recognized species in this genus:

- Diancistrus alatus Schwarzhans, Møller & J. G. Nielsen, 2005 (Winged coralbrotula)
- Diancistrus alleni Schwarzhans, Møller & J. G. Nielsen, 2005 (Allen's coralbrotula)
- Diancistrus altidorsalis Schwarzhans, Møller & J. G. Nielsen, 2005 (Humpbacked coralbrotula)
- Diancistrus atollorum Schwarzhans, Møller & J. G. Nielsen, 2005 (Atoll coralbrotula)
- Diancistrus beateae Schwarzhans, Møller & J. G. Nielsen, 2005 (Beate's coralbrotula)
- Diancistrus brevirostris Schwarzhans, Møller & J. G. Nielsen, 2005 (Shortnosed coralbrotula)
- Diancistrus eremitus Schwarzhans, Møller & J. G. Nielsen, 2005 (Lonely coralbrotula)
- Diancistrus erythraeus (Fowler, 1946)
- Diancistrus fijiensis Schwarzhans, Møller & J. G. Nielsen, 2005 (Fiji coralbrotula)
- Diancistrus fuscus (Fowler, 1946) (Dusky brotulid)
- Diancistrus jackrandalli Schwarzhans, Møller & J. G. Nielsen, 2005 (Randall's coralbrotula)
- Diancistrus jeffjohnsoni Schwarzhans, Møller & J. G. Nielsen, 2005 (Johnson's coralbrotula)
- Diancistrus karinae Schwarzhans, Møller & J. G. Nielsen, 2005 (Karin's coralbrotula)
- †Diancistrus kasei Schwarzhans, 2026
- Diancistrus katrineae Schwarzhans, Møller & J. G. Nielsen, 2005 (Katrine's coralbrotula)
- Diancistrus leisi Schwarzhans, Møller & J. G. Nielsen, 2005 (Leis' coralbrotula)
- Diancistrus longifilis Ogilby, 1899 (Twinhook cusk)
- Diancistrus machidai Schwarzhans, Møller & J. G. Nielsen, 2005 (Machida's coralbrotula)
- Diancistrus manciporus Schwarzhans, Møller & J. G. Nielsen, 2005 (Few-pored coralbrotula)
- Diancistrus mcgroutheri Schwarzhans, Møller & J. G. Nielsen, 2005 (McGrouther's coralbrotula)
- Diancistrus mennei Schwarzhans, Møller & J. G. Nielsen, 2005 (Menne's coralbrotula)
- Diancistrus niger Schwarzhans, Møller & J. G. Nielsen, 2005 (Dark coralbrotula)
- Diancistrus novaeguineae (Machida, 1996)
- Diancistrus pohnpeiensis Schwarzhans, Møller & J. G. Nielsen, 2005 (Pohnpei coralbrotula)
- Diancistrus robustus Schwarzhans, Møller & J. G. Nielsen, 2005 (Robust coralbrotula)
- Diancistrus springeri Schwarzhans, Møller & J. G. Nielsen, 2005 (Springer's coralbrotula)
- Diancistrus tongaensis Schwarzhans, Møller & J. G. Nielsen, 2005 (Tonga coralbrotula)
- Diancistrus typhlops J. G. Nielsen, Schwarzhans & Hadiaty, 2009 (Blind cave coralbrotula)
- Diancistrus vietnamensis Schwarzhans, Møller & J. G. Nielsen, 2005 (Vietnam coralbrotula)
