= Paradiancistrus =

Scientific classification
- Kingdom: Animalia
- Phylum: Chordata
- Class: Actinopterygii
- Order: Ophidiiformes
- Family: Bythitidae
- Tribe: Dinematichthyini
- Genus: Paradiancistrus; Schwarzhans, Møller & J. G. Nielsen, 2005

Type species
- Paradiancistrus acutirostris Schwarzhans, Møller & Nielsen 2005

Genus of fishes

Paradiancistrus is a genus of viviparous brotulas.

== Species ==
There are currently four recognized species in this genus:

- Paradiancistrus acutirostris Schwarzhans, Møller & J. G. Nielsen, 2005 (Sharpnosed coralbrotula)
- Paradiancistrus christmasensis Schwarzhans & Møller, 2011 (Christmas viviparous brotula)
- Paradiancistrus cuyoensis Schwarzhans, Møller & J. G. Nielsen, 2005 (Cuyo coralbrotula)
- Paradiancistrus lombokensis Schwarzhans & Møller, 2007 (Lombok viviparous brotula)
