= Ungusurculus =

Scientific classification
- Kingdom: Animalia
- Phylum: Chordata
- Class: Actinopterygii
- Division: Teleostei
- Order: Ophidiiformes
- Family: Bythitidae
- Tribe: Dinematichthyini
- Genus: Ungusurculus; Schwarzhans & Møller, 2007

Type species
- Ungusurculus riauensis Schwarzhans & Møller 2007

Genus of fishes

Ungusurculus is a genus of viviparous brotulas found in the western Pacific Ocean.

== Species ==
There are currently six recognized species in this genus:

- Ungusurculus collettei Schwarzhans & Møller, 2007
- Ungusurculus komodoensis Schwarzhans & Møller, 2007
- †Ungusurculus phasmaticus Schwarzhans, 2026
- Ungusurculus philippinensis Schwarzhans & Møller, 2007
- Ungusurculus riauensis Schwarzhans & Møller, 2007
- Ungusurculus sundaensis Schwarzhans & Møller, 2007
- Ungusurculus williamsi Schwarzhans & Møller, 2007
