= San Blas coralbrotula =

Conservation status
- Data Deficient (IUCN 3.1)

Scientific classification
- Kingdom: Animalia
- Phylum: Chordata
- Class: Actinopterygii
- Order: Ophidiiformes
- Family: Bythitidae
- Subfamily: Bythitinae
- Genus: Pseudogilbia
- Species: P. sanblasensis

Binomial name
- Pseudogilbia sanblasensis Møller, Schwarzhans & J. G. Nielsen, 2004

Species of fish

The San Blas coral-brotula (Pseudogilbia sanblasensis) is a species of viviparous brotula found in reefs along the Caribbean coast of Panama. This species grows to a length of 6.6 centimetres (2.6 in) SL. This species is the only known member of its genus.
