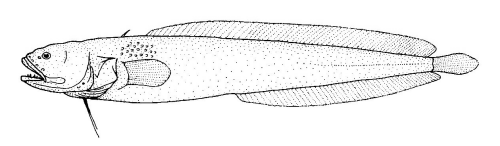
- Fleshfish (D. macrodon)

Scientific classification
- Kingdom: Animalia
- Phylum: Chordata
- Class: Actinopterygii
- Order: Ophidiiformes
- Family: Bythitidae
- Tribe: Dinematichthyini
- Genus: Dermatopsis; Ogilby, 1896

Type species
- Dermatopsus macrodon Ogilby, 1896

= Dermatopsis =

Genus of fishes

Dermatopsis is a genus of viviparous brotulas.

== Species ==
There are currently four recognized species in this genus:

- Dermatopsis greenfieldi Møller & Schwarzhans, 2006 (Greenfield's mudbrotula)
- Dermatopsis hoesei Møller & Schwarzhans, 2006 (Hoese's mudbrotula)
- Dermatopsis joergennielseni Møller & Schwarzhans, 2006 (Nielsen's mudbrotula)
- Dermatopsis macrodon Ogilby, 1896 (Fleshfish)
