= Ogilbia galapagosensis =

Conservation status
- Vulnerable (IUCN 3.1)

Scientific classification
- Kingdom: Animalia
- Phylum: Chordata
- Class: Actinopterygii
- Order: Ophidiiformes
- Family: Bythitidae
- Genus: Ogilbia
- Species: O. galapagosensis

Binomial name
- Ogilbia galapagosensis (Poll & LeLeup, 1965)

Synonyms
- Caecogilbia galapagosensis Poll and LeLeup 1965

Species of fish

Ogilbia galapagosensis, the Galapagos cuskeel, is a species of fish in the family Bythitidae. It is only known from four brackish-water cave systems on Santa Cruz Island, Galápagos, Ecuador. Although usually called a cavefish, it has been argued that this label is inaccurate, as the places it inhabit also can be described as lagoon crevices.
