= Didymothallus criniceps =

Conservation status
- Least Concern (IUCN 3.1)

Scientific classification
- Kingdom: Animalia
- Phylum: Chordata
- Class: Actinopterygii
- Order: Ophidiiformes
- Family: Bythitidae
- Genus: Didymothallus
- Species: D. criniceps

Binomial name
- Didymothallus criniceps Schwarzhans & Møller, 2007

Species of fish

Didymothallus criniceps is a fish species described by Werner W. Schwarzhans and Peter R. Møller in 2007. Didymothallus criniceps is part of the genus Didymothallus and the family Bythitidae. No subspecies are listed in the Catalog of Life.
