= Dinematichthys =

Scientific classification
- Kingdom: Animalia
- Phylum: Chordata
- Class: Actinopterygii
- Order: Ophidiiformes
- Family: Bythitidae
- Tribe: Dinematichthyini
- Genus: Dinematichthys; Bleeker, 1855

Type species
- Dinematichthys iluocoeteoides Bleeker, 1855

Species
- See text.

Genus of fishes

Dinematichthys is a genus of viviparous brotulas. Its name comes from Greek, meaning two-filamented fish (di means two, nema filament and ichthys fish).

== Species ==
There are currently two recognized species in this genus:

- Dinematichthys iluocoeteoides Bleeker, 1855 (Yellow pigmy brotula)
- Dinematichthys trilobatus Møller & Schwarzhans, 2008
