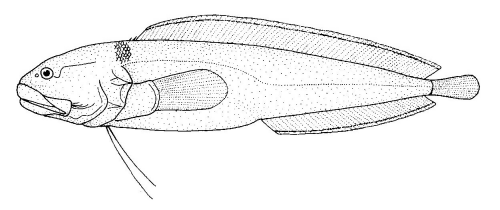
- Grey Brotula (B. consobrinus)

Scientific classification
- Kingdom: Animalia
- Phylum: Chordata
- Class: Actinopterygii
- Order: Ophidiiformes
- Family: Bythitidae
- Tribe: Brosmophycini
- Genus: Bidenichthys; Barnard, 1934

Type species
- Bidenichthys capensis Barnard, 1934

Synonyms
- Fiordichthys Paulin, 1995

= Bidenichthys =

Genus of fishes

Bidenichthys is a genus of viviparous brotulas.

== Etymology ==
The genus is named after C. Leo Biden, who collected one of the type specimens of Bidenichthys capensis and donated many specimens to the South African Museum.

== Species ==
There are currently five recognized species in this genus:

- Bidenichthys capensis Barnard, 1934 (Freetail brotula): The type species for the genus; "intertidal in rocky tidepools from East London to the Cape of Good Hope, South Africa. Uncommon."
- Bidenichthys consobrinus (F. W. Hutton, 1876) (Grey brotula): "Rocky areas at depths of 30 to 178 m off northern New Zealand. Rare."
  - Synonym: Bidenichthys beeblebroxi Paulin, 1995: "Found in holes beneath rocks and boulders from the surface to 30 m around the North Island and northern part of South Island, New Zealand. Common."
- Bidenichthys okamotoi Møller, Schwarzhans, Lauridsen & Nielsen, 2021
- Bidenichthys paxtoni (Nielsen & Cohen, 1986) (Baldhead cusk)
- Bidenichthys slartibartfasti (Paulin, 1995) (Fiordland brotula)
