= Majungaichthys =

Scientific classification
- Kingdom: Animalia
- Phylum: Chordata
- Class: Actinopterygii
- Order: Ophidiiformes
- Family: Bythitidae
- Tribe: Dinematichthyini
- Genus: Majungaichthys; Schwarzhans & Møller, 2007

Type species
- Majungaichthys simplex Schwarzhen & Møller 2007

Genus of fishes

Majungaichthys is a genus of viviparous brotulas native to the western Indian Ocean. The generic name refers to Majunga in Madagascar where the type was collected.

== Species ==
There are currently two recognized species in this genus:

- Majungaichthys agalegae Schwarzhans & Møller, 2011
- Majungaichthys simplex Schwarzhans & Møller, 2007
