= Beaglichthys =

Scientific classification
- Domain: Eukaryota
- Kingdom: Animalia
- Phylum: Chordata
- Class: Actinopterygii
- Order: Ophidiiformes
- Family: Bythitidae
- Tribe: Dinematichthyini
- Genus: Beaglichthys; Machida, 1993

Type species
- Beaglichthys macrophthalmus Machida, 1993

Genus of fishes

Beaglichthys is a genus of viviparous brotulas.

== Species ==
There are currently three recognized species in this genus:

- Beaglichthys bleekeri Schwarzhans & Møller, 2007
- Beaglichthys larsonae Schwarzhans & Møller, 2007
- Beaglichthys macrophthalmus Machida, 1993 (Beagle cusk)
