= Didymothallus =

Scientific classification
- Kingdom: Animalia
- Phylum: Chordata
- Class: Actinopterygii
- Order: Ophidiiformes
- Family: Bythitidae
- Tribe: Dinematichthyini
- Genus: Didymothallus; Schwarzhans & Møller, 2007

Type species
- Didymothallus criniceps Schwarzhans & Møller, 2007

Genus of fishes

Didymothallus is a genus of viviparous brotulas found in the Indian and western Pacific Oceans.

== Species ==
There are currently four recognized species in this genus:

- Didymothallus criniceps Schwarzhans & Møller, 2007
- Didymothallus mizolepis (Günther, 1867) (Smalleye cusk)
- Didymothallus nudigena Schwarzhans & Møller, 2011
- Didymothallus pruvosti Schwarzhans & Møller, 2007
