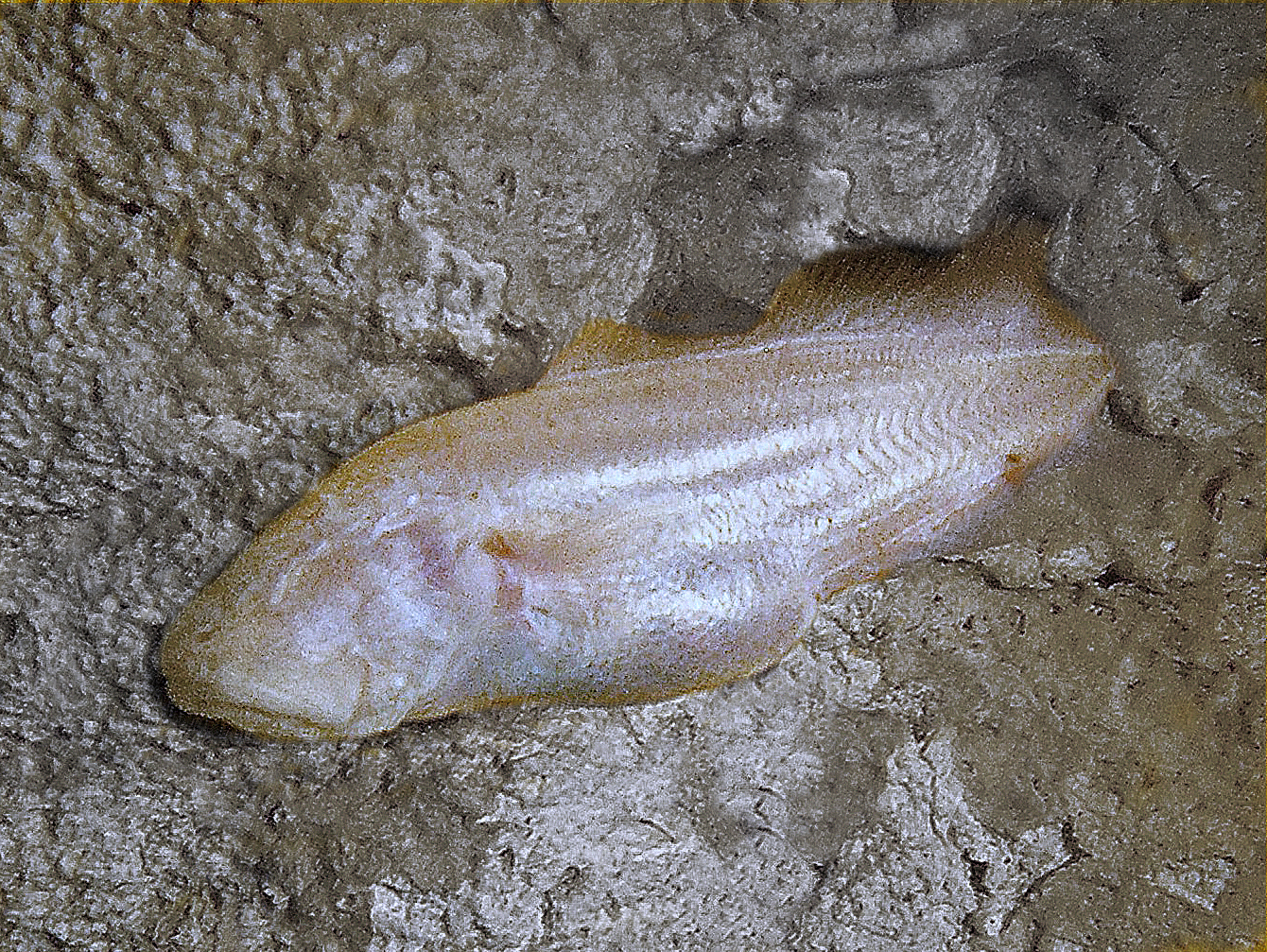

Conservation status
- Near Threatened (IUCN 3.1)

Scientific classification
- Kingdom: Animalia
- Phylum: Chordata
- Class: Actinopterygii
- Order: Ophidiiformes
- Family: Dinematichthyidae
- Genus: Typhlias
- Species: T. pearsei

Binomial name
- Typhlias pearsei C. L. Hubbs, 1938
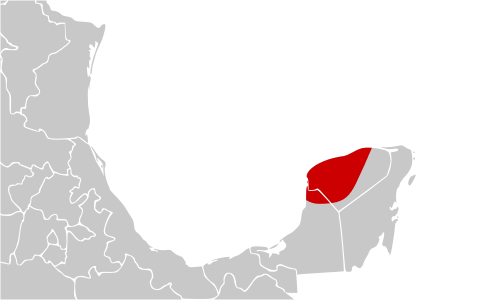

Synonyms
- Genus: Typhliasina Whitley, 1951; Species: Ogilbia pearsei (C. L. Hubbs, 1938); Typhliasina pearsei (C. L. Hubbs, 1938)

= Mexican blind brotula =

Species of fish

The Mexican blind brotula (Typhlias pearsei) is a species of viviparous brotula, of the family Dinematichthyidae, endemic to Mexico, where it is found in sinkholes and caves. It is known as sak kay in Mayan and dama blanca ciega in Spanish. This cavefish grows to a standard length of 9.7 cm (3.8 in). It is the only known member of its genus.

== Description ==
The Mexican blind brotula has a large, laterally compressed, scaleless head with no eyes, but several papillae and cavities which contain sensory organs. The nostrils are located on the upper lip and the mouth has a longitudinal split at the back. The body bears scales and has long dorsal and anal fins which terminate close to, but are separate from, the caudal fin. The dorsal fin has no spines and 75 to 87 soft rays, and the anal fin has no spines and 59 to 68 soft rays. The male has two pairs of pseudoclaspers, the inner ones being in front of the outer ones. The standard length is about 9.7 cm (3.8 in). The skin does not contain pigment, making the fish appear pinkish-white.

== Distribution ==
The Mexican blind brotula inhabits the cenotes (water-filled sink holes connected through subterranean rivers) and aquifers in the Yucatán Peninsula of Mexico, where the temperature is between 23 and 27 °C (73 and 81 °F) throughout the year. These are typically anchialine (connected to the sea), but the Mexican blind brotula is only known from the sections with fresh or brackish water.

== Ecology ==
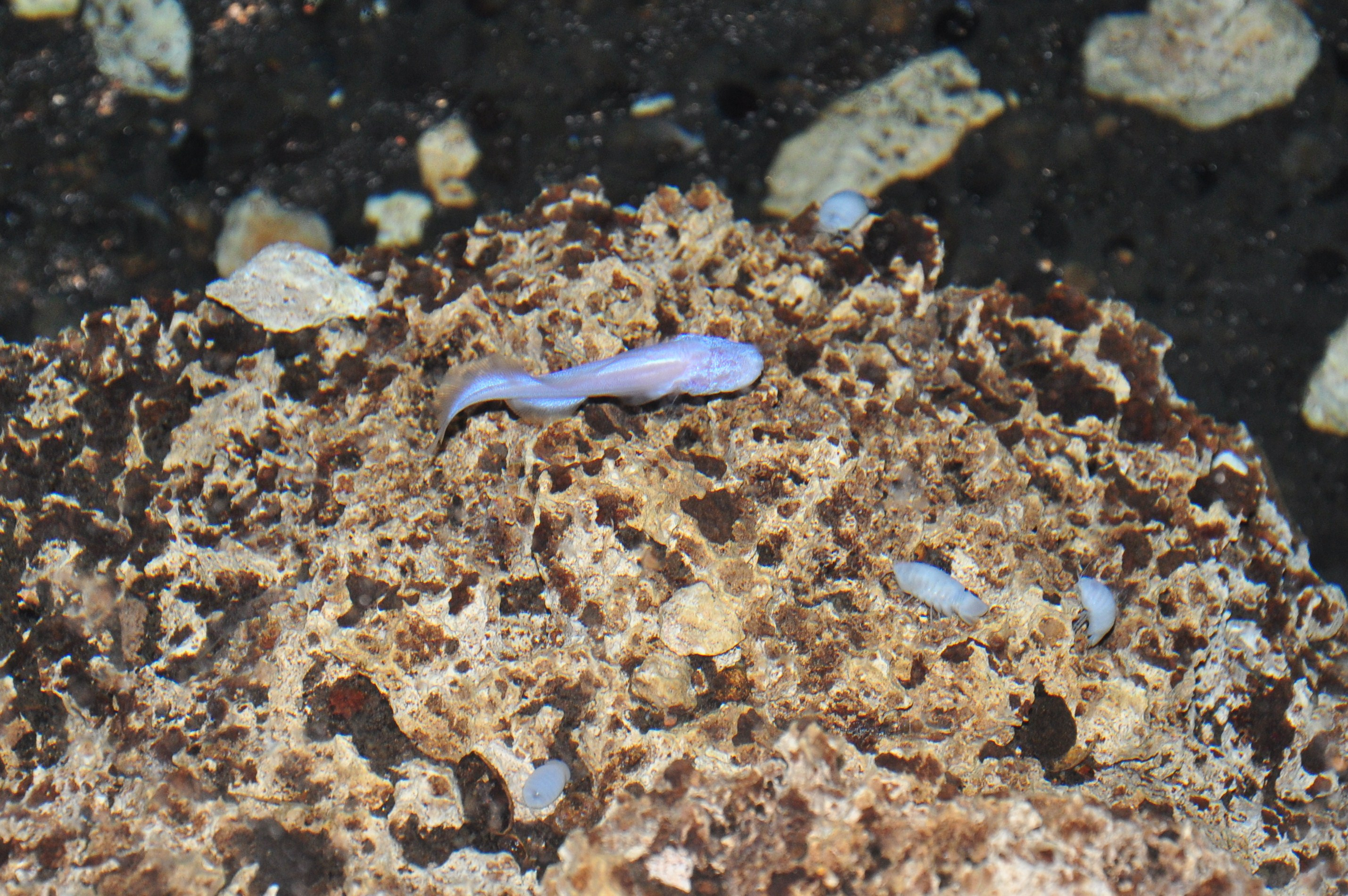
A Mexican blind brotula and several cirolanid cave isopods (Creaseriella anops)

The Mexican blind brotula is the top predator in the Yucatán aquifer system and is probably not very numerous. It feeds on crustaceans such as shrimps and mysids that also inhabit the aquifers. In some locations, it is associated with another blind fish, the blind swamp eel (Ophisternon infernale) and in one cave system, with the catfish Rhamdia guatemalensis. It does not react to light, but is very sensitive to vibrations. It is a viviparous fish, giving birth to up to a dozen young between December and February. The newborns are yellowish and about 2.4 to 3.7 cm (0.9 to 1.5 in) in length.

== Status ==
The main threat faced by this fish is from water pollution; the aquifers in which it lives are below inhabited areas with inadequate sanitary arrangements, so that coliform bacteria may leak in, and excess nitrates may be in wastewater. The International Union for Conservation of Nature has rated the conservation status of this fish as being "near threatened".

== Etymology ==
The generic name derives from the Greek typhlos meaning "blind" and the specific name honours the American ecologist, Arthur Sperry Pearse (1877-1956), who was the collector of the type specimen used by Carl Leavitt Hubbs to describe the species. The generic synonym "Typhliasina" was declared as an unneeded replacement name in 2017.
