= Microbrotula =

Scientific classification
- Kingdom: Animalia
- Phylum: Chordata
- Class: Actinopterygii
- Order: Ophidiiformes
- Family: Bythitidae
- Subfamily: Bythitinae
- Genus: Microbrotula; Gosline, 1953

Type species
- Microbrotula rubra Gosline 1953

Genus of fishes

Microbrotula is a genus of viviparous brotulas.

== Species ==
There are currently eight recognized species in this genus:

- Microbrotula andersoni Schwarzhans & J. G. Nielsen, 2011
- Microbrotula bentleyi M. E. Anderson, 2005 (Many-ray cusk)
- Microbrotula geraldalleni Schwarzhans & J. G. Nielsen, 2012
- Microbrotula greenfieldi M. E. Anderson, 2007
- Microbrotula hamata Schwarzhans & J. G. Nielsen, 2011
- Microbrotula punicea M. E. Anderson, 2007
- Microbrotula queenslandica M. E. Anderson, 2005 (Queensland cusk)
- Microbrotula rubra Gosline, 1953
