= Gunterichthys =

Scientific classification
- Kingdom: Animalia
- Phylum: Chordata
- Class: Actinopterygii
- Order: Ophidiiformes
- Family: Bythitidae
- Tribe: Dinematichthyini
- Genus: Gunterichthys; C. E. Dawson, 1966

Genus of fishes

Gunterichthys is a genus of viviparous brotula.

== Species ==
There are currently three recognized species in this genus:

- Gunterichthys bussingi Møller, Schwarzhans & J. G. Nielsen, 2004 (Bussing's mudbrotula)
- Gunterichthys coheni Møller, Schwarzhans & J. G. Nielsen, 2004 (Cohen's mudbrotula)
- Gunterichthys longipenis C. E. Dawson, 1966 (Gold brotula)
