= Eusurculus =

Scientific classification
- Kingdom: Animalia
- Phylum: Chordata
- Class: Actinopterygii
- Order: Ophidiiformes
- Family: Bythitidae
- Tribe: Brosmophycini
- Genus: Eusurculus; Schwarzhans & Møller, 2007

Type species
- Eusurculus pistillum Schwarzhans & Møller, 2007

Genus of fishes

Eusurculus are fish species of viviparous brotula.

== Species ==
There are currently three recognized species in this genus:

- Eusurculus andamanensis Schwarzhans & Møller, 2007
- Eusurculus pistillum Schwarzhans & Møller, 2007
- Eusurculus pristinus Schwarzhans & Møller, 2007
