= Longtail cusk =

Conservation status
- Least Concern (IUCN 3.1)

Scientific classification
- Kingdom: Animalia
- Phylum: Chordata
- Class: Actinopterygii
- Order: Ophidiiformes
- Family: Bythitidae
- Genus: Brosmolus
- Species: B. longicaudus

Binomial name
- Brosmolus longicaudus Machida, 1993

Species of fish

The longtail cusk (Brosmolus longicaudus) is a species of viviparous brotula native to the reefs around Australia. This species grows to a length of 5.8 centimetres (2.3 in) SL.

It is a benthic species likely living in inshore waters around the Indio-Pacific with hard substances, though its depth range is unknown. Specimens have been obtained from four locations in northern Australia (Umbanganan Island, Kalumburu, Shoal Bay and Sweers Island) and one in southern Papua New Guinea (Daru Island).

It is classified as Least Concern (LC) by the IUCN; no threats or population data are known.
