= Taiwan coral-brotula =

Conservation status
- Least Concern (IUCN 3.1)

Scientific classification
- Kingdom: Animalia
- Phylum: Chordata
- Class: Actinopterygii
- Order: Ophidiiformes
- Family: Bythitidae
- Genus: Brotulinella
- Species: B. taiwanensis

Binomial name
- Brotulinella taiwanensis Schwarzhans, Møller & J. G. Nielsen, 2005

Species of fish

The Taiwan coral-brotula (Brotulinella taiwanensis) is a species of viviparous brotula, the only known member of its genus, found mostly in the surf zone of the waters around Taiwan and the Philippines where it lives amongst rocks. This species grows to a length of 6 centimetres (2.4 in) SL.
