= Southern pygmy blindfish =

Conservation status
- Least Concern (IUCN 3.1)

Scientific classification
- Kingdom: Animalia
- Phylum: Chordata
- Class: Actinopterygii
- Order: Ophidiiformes
- Family: Bythitidae
- Genus: Dactylosurculus
- Species: D. gomoni

Binomial name
- Dactylosurculus gomoni Schwarzhans & Møller, 2007

Species of fish

The Southern pygmy blindfish (Dactylosurculus gomoni) is a species of viviparous brotula, the only known member of its genus, found in the waters of the Indian Ocean off the coast of western Australia. This species grows to a length of 6 centimetres (2.4 in) SL. The specific name honours Martin F. Gomon, who was the senior curator of fishes at the Museum of Victoria in Melbourne, for his numerous contributions to the ichthyology of Australia.
