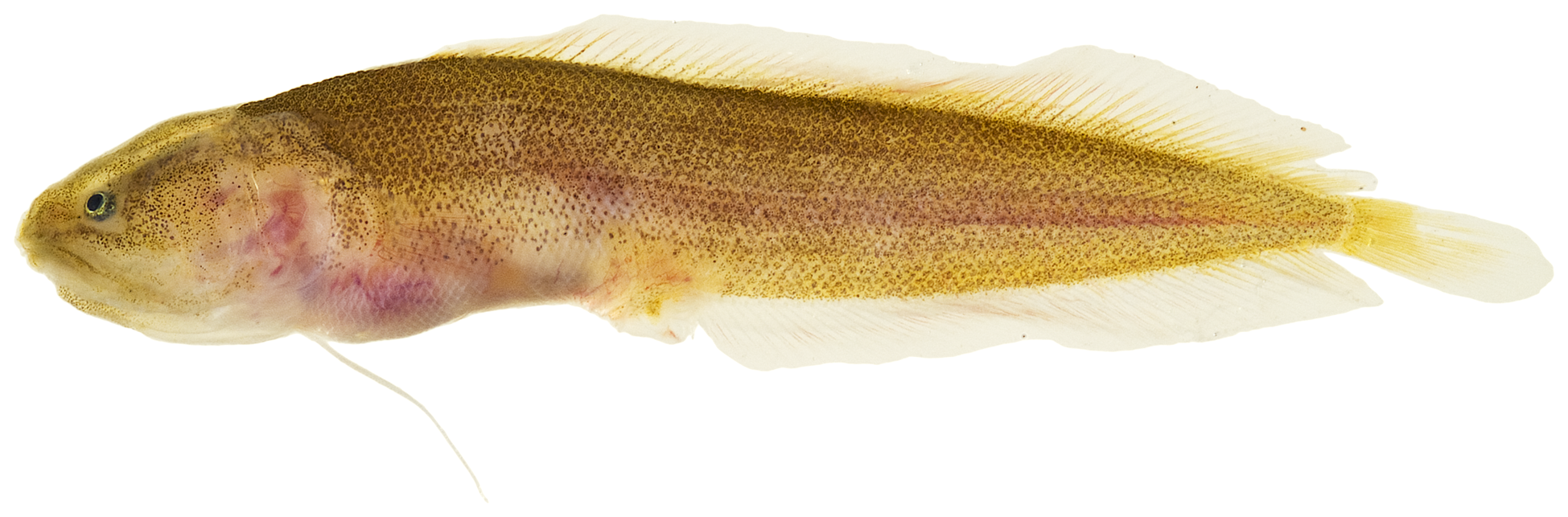
- Ogilbia sabaji

Scientific classification
- Kingdom: Animalia
- Phylum: Chordata
- Class: Actinopterygii
- Order: Ophidiiformes
- Family: Bythitidae
- Tribe: Dinematichthyini
- Genus: Ogilbia; D. S. Jordan & Evermann, 1898

Type species
- Ogilbia cayorum Evermann & Kendall 1898

= Ogilbia =

Ogilbia Temporal range: Thanetian to Present

Genus of fishes

Ogilbia is a genus of viviparous brotulas. The generic name honours the Australian naturalist James Douglas Ogilby (1853-1925), for his contribution to the knowledge of the fishes of Australia.

== Species ==
There are currently 18 recognized species in this genus:

- Ogilbia boehlkei Møller, Schwarzhans & J. G. Nielsen, 2005 (Boehlke's coralbrotula)
- Ogilbia boydwalkeri Møller, Schwarzhans & J. G. Nielsen, 2005 (Walker's coralbrotula)
- Ogilbia cayorum Evermann & Kendall, 1898 (Key brotula)
- Ogilbia cocoensis Møller, Schwarzhans & J. G. Nielsen, 2005 (Coco coralbrotula)
- Ogilbia davidsmithi Møller, Schwarzhans & J. G. Nielsen, 2005 (Smith's coralbrotula)
- Ogilbia deroyi (Poll & Van Mol, 1966) (Deroy's cusk-eel)
- Ogilbia galapagosensis (Poll & LeLeup, 1965) (Galapagos cusk-eel)
- Ogilbia jeffwilliamsi Møller, Schwarzhans & J. G. Nielsen, 2005 (Williams' coralbrotula)
- Ogilbia jewettae Møller, Schwarzhans & J. G. Nielsen, 2005 (Jewett's coralbrotula)
- Ogilbia mccoskeri Møller, Schwarzhans & J. G. Nielsen, 2005 (McCosker's coralbrotula)
- Ogilbia nigromarginata Møller, Schwarzhans & J. G. Nielsen, 2005 (Dark-finned coralbrotula)
- Ogilbia nudiceps Møller, Schwarzhans & J. G. Nielsen, 2005 (Naked-headed coralbrotula)
- Ogilbia robertsoni Møller, Schwarzhans & J. G. Nielsen, 2005 (Robertson's coralbrotula)
- Ogilbia sabaji Møller, Schwarzhans & J. G. Nielsen, 2005 (Sabaji's coralbrotula)
- Ogilbia sedorae Møller, Schwarzhans & J. G. Nielsen, 2005 (Sedor's coralbrotula)
- Ogilbia suarezae Møller, Schwarzhans & J. G. Nielsen, 2005 (Suarez' coralbrotula)
- Ogilbia tyleri Møller, Schwarzhans & J. G. Nielsen, 2005 (Tyler's coralbrotula)
- Ogilbia ventralis (T. N. Gill, 1863) (Gulf cusk-eel)
