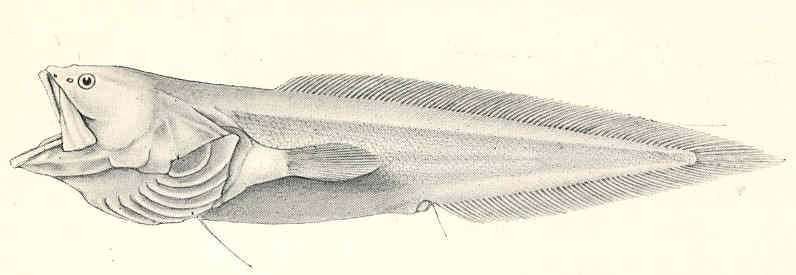
- Saccogaster maculata

Scientific classification
- Kingdom: Animalia
- Phylum: Chordata
- Class: Actinopterygii
- Order: Ophidiiformes
- Family: Bythitidae
- Subfamily: Bythitinae; Gill, 1861

= Bythitinae =

Subfamily of fishes

Bythitinae is a subfamily of viviparous brotulas, one of the two subfamilies in the family Bythitidae. This subfamily is characterised by having the dorsal, caudal and anal fins combined. They are mostly found in temperate to tropical seas, from reefs to the benthopelagic zone, but some species from the North Atlantic Ocean occur in into Arctic waters.

== Genera ==
The following genera are included in the subfamily Bythininae:

- Acarobythites
- Anacanthobythites
- Bellottia
- Bythites
- Calamopteryx
- Cataetyx
- Diplacanthopoma
- Ematops
- Grammonus
- Hastatobythites
- Hephthocara
- Microbrotula
- Parasaccogaster
- Pseudogilbia
- Pseudonus
- Saccogaster
- Stygnobrotula
- Thalassobathia
- Thermichthys
- Timorichthys
- Tuamotuichthys
