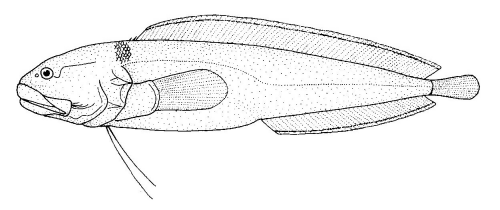
- Bidenichthys consobrinus

Scientific classification
- Kingdom: Animalia
- Phylum: Chordata
- Class: Actinopterygii
- Order: Ophidiiformes
- Family: Bythitidae
- Subfamily: Brosmophycinae; Gill, 1862

Tribes
- Brosmophycini; Dinematichthyini

= Brosmophycinae =

Subfamily of fishes

Brosmophycinae is a subfamily of the viviparous brotulas. They are divided from the subfamily Bythitinae by having the dorsal fin, caudal fin and anal fin all separate whereas they are joined in the Bythitinae. It is divided into the tribes Dinematichthyini and Brosmophycini, with the first having hardened genital claspers and the second soft genital claspers. A review in 2016 elevated the Dinematichthyini to the status of a family the Dinematichthyidae.
