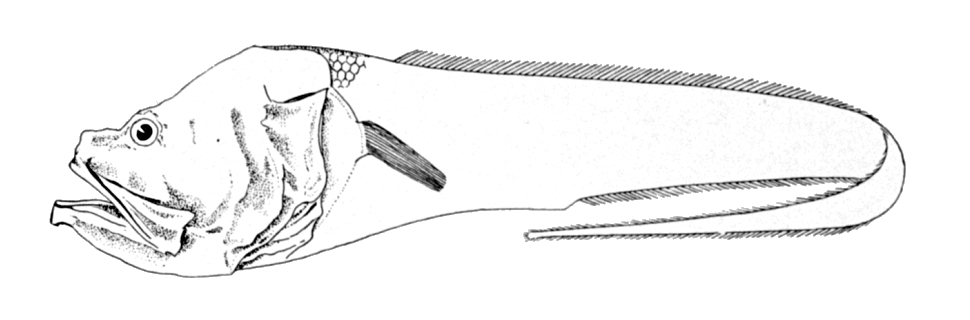
- Hephthocara simum

Scientific classification
- Domain: Eukaryota
- Kingdom: Animalia
- Phylum: Chordata
- Class: Actinopterygii
- Order: Ophidiiformes
- Family: Bythitidae; T. N. Gill, 1861

Subfamilies
- See text

= Viviparous brotula =

Viviparous brotulas

Family of fishes

The viviparous brotulas form a family, the Bythitidae, of ophidiiform fishes. They are known as viviparous brotulas as they generally bear live young, although there are indications that some species (at least Didymothallus criniceps) do not. They are generally infrequently seen, somewhat tadpole-like in overall shape and mostly about 5–10 cm (2–4 in) in length, but some species grow far larger and may surpass 60 cm (2 ft).

Although many live near the coast in tropical or subtropical oceans, there are also species in deep water and cold oceans, for example Bythites. Thermichthys hollisi, which lives at depths of around 2,500 m (8,200 ft), is associated with thermal vents. A few are fresh or brackish water cavefish: the Mexican blind brotula (Typhliasina pearsei), Galapagos cuskeel (Ogilbia galapagosensis), Diancistrus typhlops and some Lucifuga species.

Since 2002, more than 110 new species have been added to this family. In 2005, 26 new species were described in a single paper by Danish and German scientists and in 2007, an additional eight new genera with 20 new species were described in another paper by the same scientists.

In some classifications the family Aphyonidae is placed within the Bythitidae and the tribe Dinematichthyini of the subfamily Brosmophycinae has been raised to the status of a family, the Dinematichthyidae which contains 25 genera and 114 species.

The Bythitidae is divided as follows:

- Subfamily Brosmophycinae
  - Tribe Dinematichthyini
    - Alionematichthys
    - Beaglichthys
    - Brosmolus
    - Brotulinella
    - Dactylosurculus
    - Dermatopsis
    - Dermatopsoides
    - Diancistrus
    - Didymothallus
    - Dinematichthys
    - Dipulus
    - Gunterichthys
    - Lapitaichthys
    - Majungaichthys
    - Mascarenichthys
    - Monothrix
    - Nielsenichthys
    - Ogilbia
    - Ogilbichthys
    - Paradiancistrus
    - Porocephalichthys
    - Typhliasina
    - Ungusurculus
    - Zephyrichthys
  - Tribe Brosmophycini
    - Bidenichthys
    - Brosmodorsalis
    - Brosmophyciops
    - Brosmophycis
    - Eusurculus
    - Fiordichthys
    - Lucifuga
    - Melodichthys
- Subfamily Bythitinae
  - Acarobythites
  - Anacanthobythites
  - Bellottia
  - Bythites
  - Calamopteryx
  - Cataetyx
  - Diplacanthopoma
  - Ematops
  - Grammonus
  - Hastatobythites
  - Hephthocara
  - Microbrotula
  - Parasaccogaster
  - Pseudogilbia
  - Pseudonus
  - Saccogaster
  - Stygnobrotula
  - Thalassobathia
  - Thermichthys
  - Timorichthys
  - Tuamotuichthys
