= Daniel Morris Cohen =

American ichthyologist (1930–2017)

- Born: July 6, 1930; Chicago, Illinois, U.S.
- Died: September 26, 2017 (aged 87); San Rafael, California, U.S.
- Scientific career
- Fields: Ichthyology

Daniel Morris Cohen (6 July 1930 - 26 September 2017) was an American ichthyologist who was known for his studies on the taxonomy of salmonid, gadid, and ophidiiform fishes.

Cohen mainly studied the taxonomy of deep-sea fishes in the orders Salmoniformes, Gadiformes, and Ophidiformes. He held the post of professor of biology at the University of Florida for one year. He then took an appointment at the U.S. Bureau of Commercial Fisheries Ichthyological Laboratory in Washington, D.C. as a systematic zoologist. He stayed there for 23 years before moving to California to become the Chief Curator of Life Sciences at the Natural History Museum of Los Angeles County. Cohen was the deputy director for Research and Collections when he retired in 1995.

== Taxon described by him ==
- See Category:Taxa named by Daniel Morris Cohen
- Argentina aliceae Cohen & Atsaides 1969
- Argentina brucei Cohen & Atsaides 1969
- Argentina euchus Cohen 1961
- Argentina stewarti Cohen & Atsaides 1969
- Glossanodon mildredae Cohen & Atsaides 1969
- Glossanodon polli Cohen 1958
- Glossanodon struhsakeri Cohen 1970
- Glossanodon pygmaeus Cohen 1958
- Bathylagichthys greyae (Cohen 1958)
- Bathylychnops exilis Cohen 1958
- Nansenia candida Cohen 1958
- Bidenichthys paxtoni (Nielsen & Cohen 1986)
- Thermichthys hollisi Cohen & Rosenbladt, 1990
- Liparis newmani Cohen 1960
- Paraliparis calidus Cohen 1968
- Lycenchelys bullisi Cohen 1964
- Thermarces andersoni Rosenblatt & Cohen 1986
- Paraliparis calidus Cohen 1968

== Taxon named in his honor ==
- Physiculus coheni Paulin, 1989 is a bathydemersal fish found in the Eastern Central Pacific Ocean.
- Glossanodon danieli Parin & Shcherbachev 1982
- Liparis coheni Able 1976
- Nezumia coheni Iwamoto & Merrett 1997
