= Breizacanthus =

Scientific classification
- Kingdom: Animalia
- Phylum: Acanthocephala
- Class: Palaeacanthocephala
- Order: Echinorhynchida
- Family: Arhythmacanthidae
- Genus: Breizacanthus; Golvan, 1969

Genus of parasitic worms

Breizacanthus is a genus in Acanthocephala (thorny-headed worms, also known as spiny-headed worms).

== Taxonomy ==
The genus was described by Golvan in 1969. The National Center for Biotechnology Information does not indicate that any phylogenetic analysis has been published on any Breizacanthus species that would confirm its position as a unique order in the family Arhythmacanthidae. In the absence of genetic information, morphological traits are used to define this genus. These traits include: a cylindrical proboscis, the absence of spines on the trunk, only the anterior end of trunk is dilated, and the lemnisci are longer than the proboscis receptacle. It is morphologically very similar to Euzetacanthus where both the anterior and posterior ends of trunk are dilated and the lemnisci are not longer than the proboscis receptacle.

== Description ==
Breizacanthus species consist of a proboscis covered in hooks and a long trunk without any spines.

== Species ==
The genus Breizacanthus Golvan, 1969 contains five species.

- Breizacanthus aznari Hernández-Orts, Alama-Bermejo, Crespo, García, Raga & Montero, 2012 Infests the banded cusk-eel (Raneya brasiliensis), and the pink cusk-eel (Genypterus blacodes).
- Breizacanthus chabaudi Golvan, 1969 Infests the Striped red mullet (Mullus surmuletus).
- Breizacanthus golvani Gaevskaja & Shukhgalter, 1984
- Breizacanthus irenae Golvan, 1969
- Breizacanthus ligur Paggi, Orecchia & Della Setta, 1975 It is named after the Ligurian Sea.

== Distribution ==
The distribution of Breizacanthus is determined by that of its hosts. B. aznari is found off the Patagonian coast in Argentina.

== Hosts ==
Life cycle of Acanthocephala. (Note: There are no known aberrant human infections for Breizacanthus species.)

The life cycle of an acanthocephalan consists of three stages beginning when an infective acanthor (development of an egg) is released from the intestines of the definitive host and then ingested by an arthropod, the intermediate host. Although the intermediate hosts of Breizacanthus are ???. When the acanthor molts, the second stage called the acanthella begins. This stage involves penetrating the wall of the mesenteron or the intestine of the intermediate host and growing. The final stage is the infective cystacanth which is the larval or juvenile state of an Acanthocephalan, differing from the adult only in size and stage of sexual development. The cystacanths within the intermediate hosts are consumed by the definitive host, usually attaching to the walls of the intestines, and as adults they reproduce sexually in the intestines. The acanthor is passed in the feces of the definitive host and the cycle repeats. There may be paratenic hosts (hosts where parasites infest but do not undergo larval development or sexual reproduction) for Breizacanthus.

Breizacanthus parasitizes animals. There are no reported cases of Breizacanthus infesting humans in the English language medical literature.

Hosts for Breizacanthus species

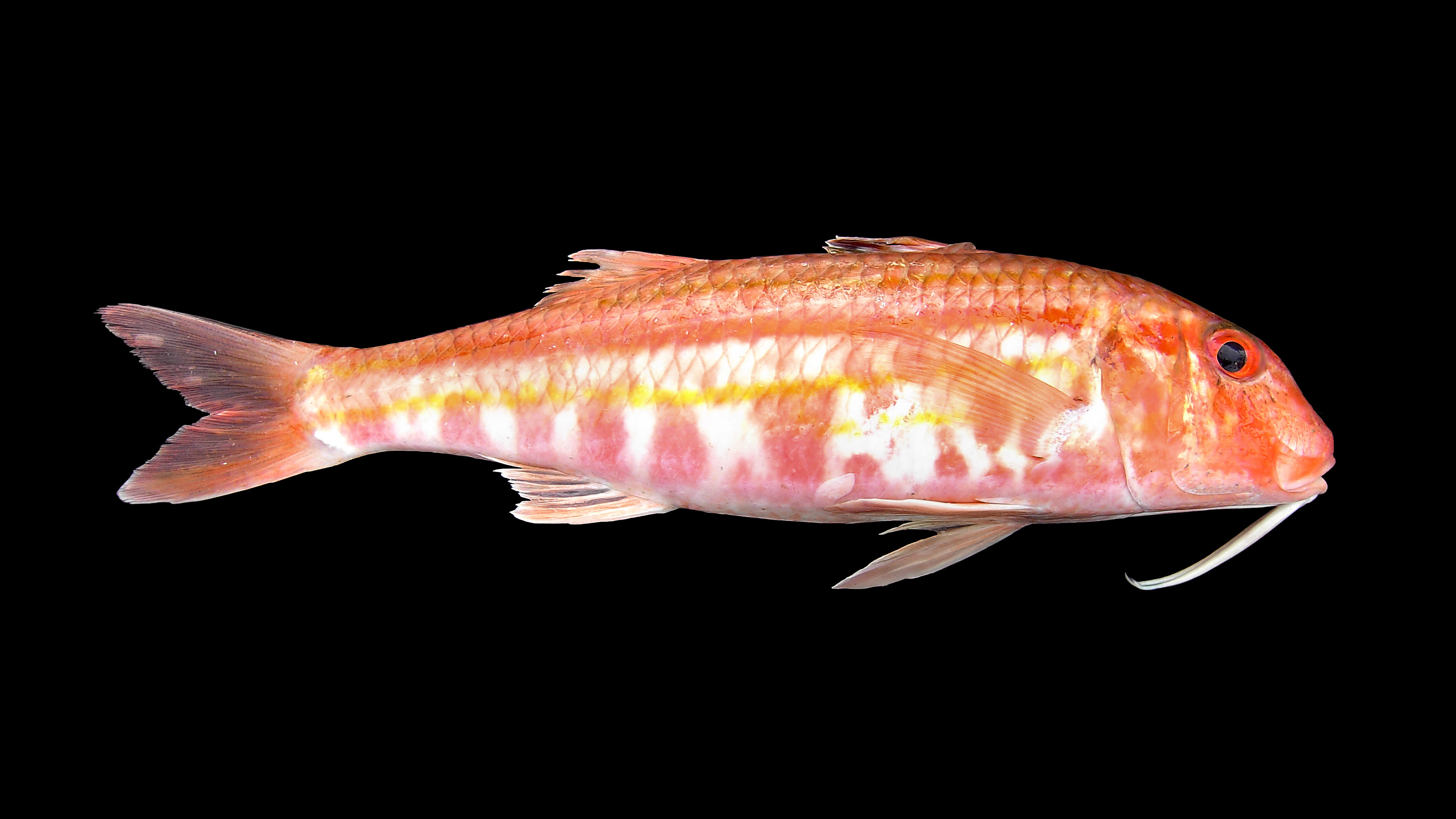
The Striped red mullet is a host of b. chabaudi
