= Euzetacanthus =

Scientific classification
- Kingdom: Animalia
- Phylum: Acanthocephala
- Class: Palaeacanthocephala
- Order: Echinorhynchida
- Family: Arhythmacanthidae
- Genus: Euzetacanthus; Golvan and Houin, 1964

Type species
- Euzetacanthus simplex

Genus of parasitic worms

Euzetacanthus is a genus in Acanthocephala (thorny-headed worms, also known as spiny-headed worms).

== Taxonomy ==
The genus was described by Golvan and Houin in 1964. The National Center for Biotechnology Information does not indicate that any phylogenetic analysis has been published on any Euzetacanthus species that would confirm its position as a unique order in the family Arhythmacanthidae.

This genus is delineating from others in the family Arhythmacanthidae morphologically, though the definitions contain exceptions. Euzetacanthus is one of only three genera in this family to have a trunk completely missing spines. It is distinguished from Paracanthocephaloides by not having a globular or claviform shape of the proboscis. It is distinguished from Breizacanthus by having both the anterior and posterior end of the trunk dilatated instead of just the anterior end and by having shorter lemnisci compared to the proboscis receptacle. Exceptions to this taxonomy include: E. simplex where the lemnisci are slightly larger than the proboscis receptacle, in E. chorinemusi and E. golvani only the anterior body end is dilated.

== Description ==
Euzetacanthus species consist of a cylindrical proboscis covered in hooks and a spineless trunk. The female is larger than the male.

== Species ==
The genus Euzetacanthus Golvan and Houin, 1964 contains three species.

- Euzetacanthus chorinemusi Gupta & Naqvi, 1984
- Euzetacanthus golvani Gupta & Fatma, 1985
- Euzetacanthus simplex (Rudolphi, 1810)

E. simplex has a complicated taxonomic history. Golvan et Houin made it the type species in 1964. It was originally called Echinorhynchus Triglae gurnadi by Rathike, 1799 and then described as Echinorhynchus simplex by Rudolphi in 1810.

== Distribution ==
The distribution of Euzetacanthus is determined by that of its hosts. They are found off the coast of Denmark, the Indian Ocean, and the western Mediterranean.

== Hosts ==
Life cycle of Acanthocephala. (Note: There are no known aberrant human infections for Euzetacanthus species.)

The life cycle of an acanthocephalan consists of three stages beginning when an infective acanthor (development of an egg) is released from the intestines of the definitive host and then ingested by an arthropod, the intermediate host. Although the intermediate hosts of Euzetacanthus are arthropods. When the acanthor molts, the second stage called the acanthella begins. This stage involves penetrating the wall of the mesenteron or the intestine of the intermediate host and growing. The final stage is the infective cystacanth which is the larval or juvenile state of an Acanthocephalan, differing from the adult only in size and stage of sexual development. The cystacanths within the intermediate hosts are consumed by the definitive host, usually attaching to the walls of the intestines, and as adults they reproduce sexually in the intestines. The acanthor is passed in the feces of the definitive host and the cycle repeats. There may be paratenic hosts (hosts where parasites infest but do not undergo larval development or sexual reproduction) for Euzetacanthus.

Euzetacanthus parasitizes fish from the genus Ariidae, Carangidae and Mullidae. There are no reported cases of Euzetacanthus infesting humans in the English language medical literature.
