= Yamagutirhynchus =

Scientific classification
- Domain: Eukaryota
- Kingdom: Animalia
- Phylum: Acanthocephala
- Class: Palaeacanthocephala
- Order: Echinorhynchida
- Family: Arhythmacanthidae
- Genus: Yamagutirhynchus; Smales, 2022

Species
- Yamagutirhynchus elliotae Smales 2022; Yamagutirhynchus lymberyi Smales 2022

Genus of parasitic worm

Yamagutirhynchus is a genus of Acanthocephala (spiny-headed worms). Yamagutirhynchus is a genus of Australian worms. Its distribution is determined by its hosts.

== Description ==
Yamagutirhynchus have a cylindrical proboscis with a larger middle region. Both species in the genus have 10 rows of teeth on the proboscis with 4–5 teeth on each row.

== Species ==
The genus Yamagutirhynchus Smales 2022 contains two known species:

- Yamagutirhynchus elliotae Smales 2022 its largest teeth are 51μm long.
- Yamagutirhynchus lymberyi Smales 2022 its largest teeth are 42.5μm long.
