= Bolborhynchoides =

Scientific classification
- Kingdom: Animalia
- Phylum: Acanthocephala
- Class: Palaeacanthocephala
- Order: Echinorhynchida
- Family: Arhythmacanthidae
- Genus: Bolborhynchoides; Achmerov and Dombrovskaja-Achmerova, 1959
- Species: B. exiguus

Binomial name
- Bolborhynchoides exiguus (Achmerow & Dombrowskaja-Achmerova, 1941)

Genus of parasitic worms

Bolborhynchoides is a monotypic genus of acanthocephalans (thorny-headed or spiny-headed parasitic worms) containing a single species, Bolborhynchoides exiguus, that infests animals.

== Taxonomy ==
The genus was created by Achmerov and Dombrovskaja-Achmerova, 1959 based on a new arrangement. The original name was Bolborhynchus exiguus named by the same scientists: Achmerov & Dombrovskaja-Achmerova in 1941. The National Center for Biotechnology Information does not indicate that any phylogenetic analysis has been published on Bolborhynchoides that would confirm its position as a unique genus in the family Arhythmacanthidae.

== Description ==
Bolborhynchoides exiguus consists of a proboscis covered in hooks and a trunk.

== Distribution ==
The distribution of Bolborhynchoides exiguus is determined by that of its hosts. It was found in the Amur river.

== Hosts ==
Life cycle of Acanthocephala. (Note: There are no known aberrant human infections for Bolborhynchoides exiguus species.)

The life cycle of an acanthocephalan consists of three stages beginning when an infective acanthor (development of an egg) is released from the intestines of the definitive host and then ingested by an arthropod, the intermediate host. Although the intermediate hosts of Bolborhynchoides are arthropods. When the acanthor molts, the second stage called the acanthella begins. This stage involves penetrating the wall of the mesenteron or the intestine of the intermediate host and growing. The final stage is the infective cystacanth which is the larval or juvenile state of an Acanthocephalan, differing from the adult only in size and stage of sexual development. The cystacanths within the intermediate hosts are consumed by the definitive host, usually attaching to the walls of the intestines, and as adults they reproduce sexually in the intestines. The acanthor is passed in the feces of the definitive host and the cycle repeats. There may be paratenic hosts (hosts where parasites infest but do not undergo larval development or sexual reproduction) for Bolborhynchoides.

Bolborhynchoides exiguus parasitizes fish. There are no reported cases of B. exiguus infesting humans in the English language medical literature.

Hosts for Bolborhynchoides exiguus
