= Ophidion zavalai =

Scientific classification
- Kingdom: Animalia
- Phylum: Chordata
- Class: Actinopterygii
- Order: Ophidiiformes
- Family: Ophidiidae
- Genus: Ophidion
- Species: O. zavalai

Binomial name
- Ophidion zavalai Rotundo, Caires, de Oliveira, Kuranaka, Figueiredo-Filho & Marceniuk, 2023

Species of cusk-eel

Ophidion zavalai is a species of cusk-eel from the Ophidiidae family. It was discovered through taxonomic revisions of the band cusk-eel (Ophidion holbrookii) on the coast of Laje da Conceição Island, where its type locality is given. It occurs on soft bottoms off the eastern to southeastern coast of Brazil.

Ophidion zavalai is an elongate fish with moderately compressed body and tapering tail. It can grow to 30 cm (12 in) standard length.

== Etymology ==
The fish is named in honor of Peruvian-born Brazilian ichthyologist Luis Alberto Zavala-Camin (1938-2023), a researcher at the Instituto de Pesca, in São Paulo, Brazil, and a professor at the Universidade Santa Cecília in Santos, Brazil, for his contribution to the knowledge of marine fishes in Brazil.
