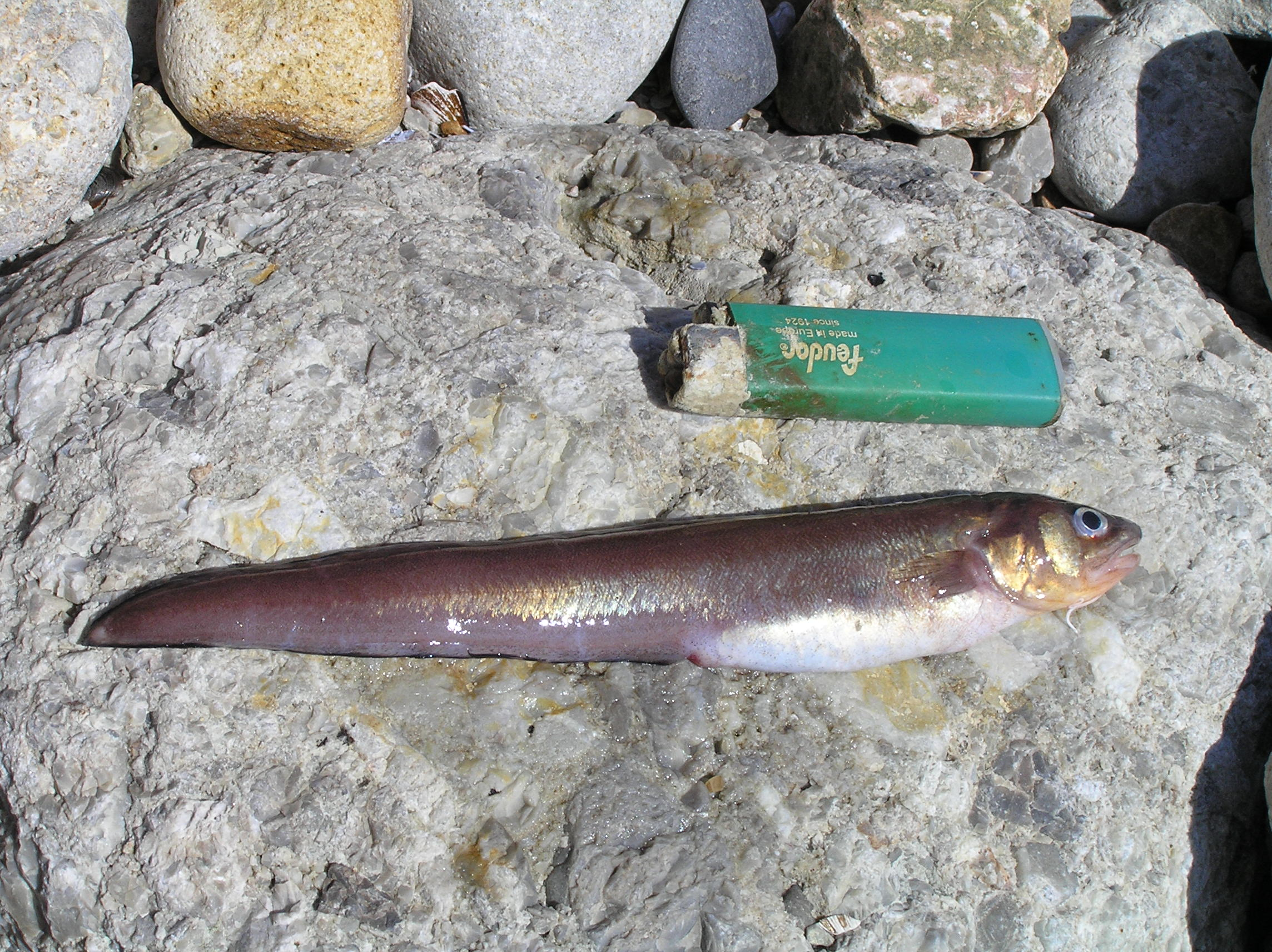
- Ophidion rochei from the Snake Island, Black Sea, Ukraine

Conservation status
- Data Deficient (IUCN 3.1)

Scientific classification
- Kingdom: Animalia
- Phylum: Chordata
- Class: Actinopterygii
- Order: Ophidiiformes
- Family: Ophidiidae
- Genus: Ophidion
- Species: O. rochei

Binomial name
- Ophidion rochei Müller, 1845

Synonyms
- Ophidion broussoneti Müller, 1845

= Roche's snake blenny =

Species of fish

Roche's snake blenny (Ophidion rochei) is a fish species in the genus Ophidion and the family Ophidiidae. Widespread in the Mediterranean Sea in western and northern regions, also in the Black Sea, Sea of Marmara and it has been recorded in the Atlantic. Marine subtropical demersal fish, up to 29.3 centimetres (11.5 in) long. This fish species has distinctive sonic capabilities, produced by the dorsal, intermediate, and ventral sonic muscles. Additionally, females tend to produce sounds having short duration and pulsation, while male sounds are longer and show a unique pattern of pulsation, resulting in characteristic distinctions between the Ophidion rochei and the Ophidion barbatum, its twin species. The specific name honors the Swiss physician and naturalist François-Etienne Delaroche (1780–1813), who wrote about the distinctive swim-bladder anatomy of Ophidion barbatum in 1809.
