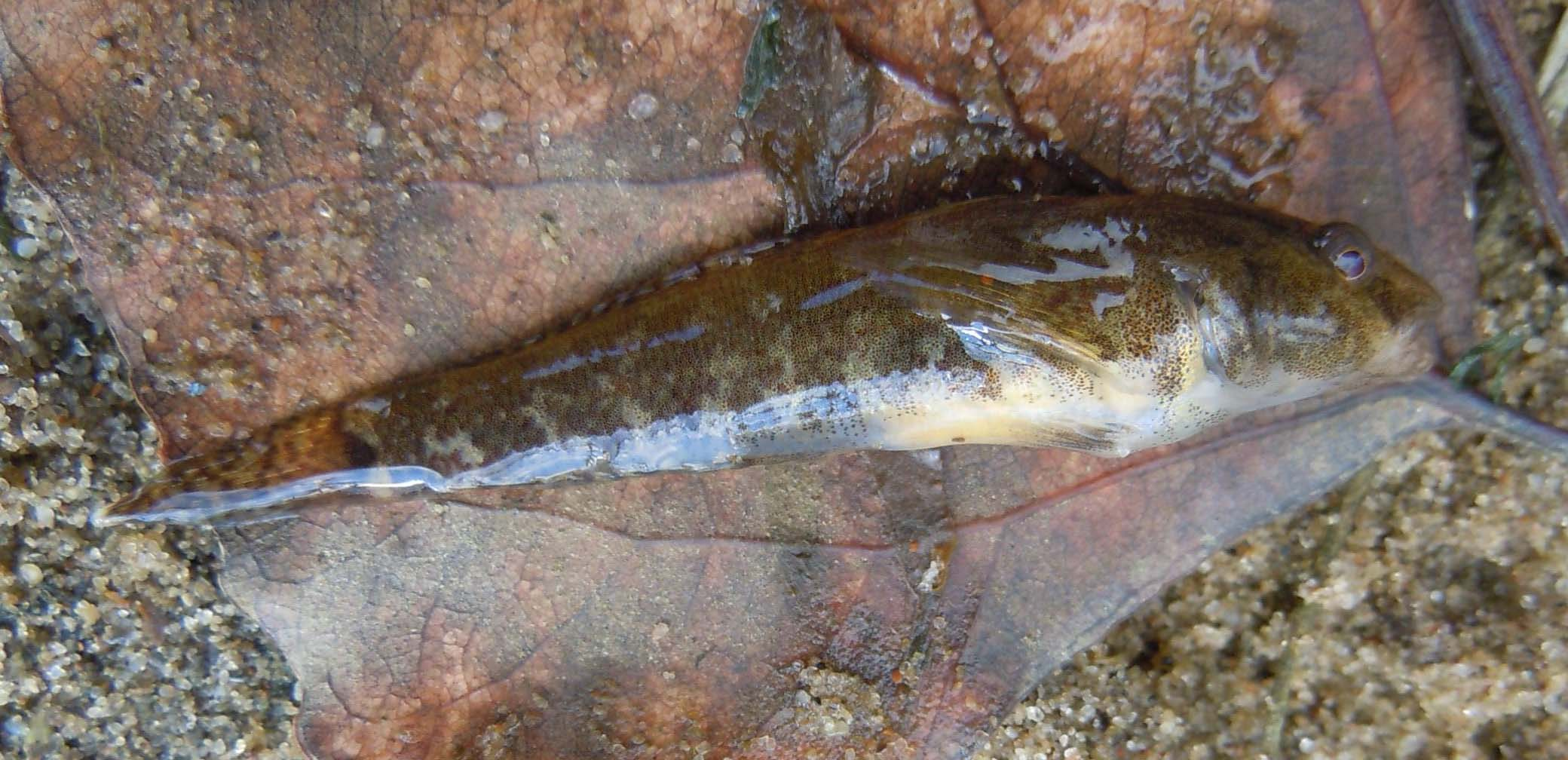

Scientific classification
- Kingdom: Animalia
- Phylum: Chordata
- Class: Actinopterygii
- Order: Gobiiformes
- Family: Gobiidae
- Genus: Proterorhinus
- Species: P. semipellucidus

Binomial name
- Proterorhinus semipellucidus (Kessler, 1877)
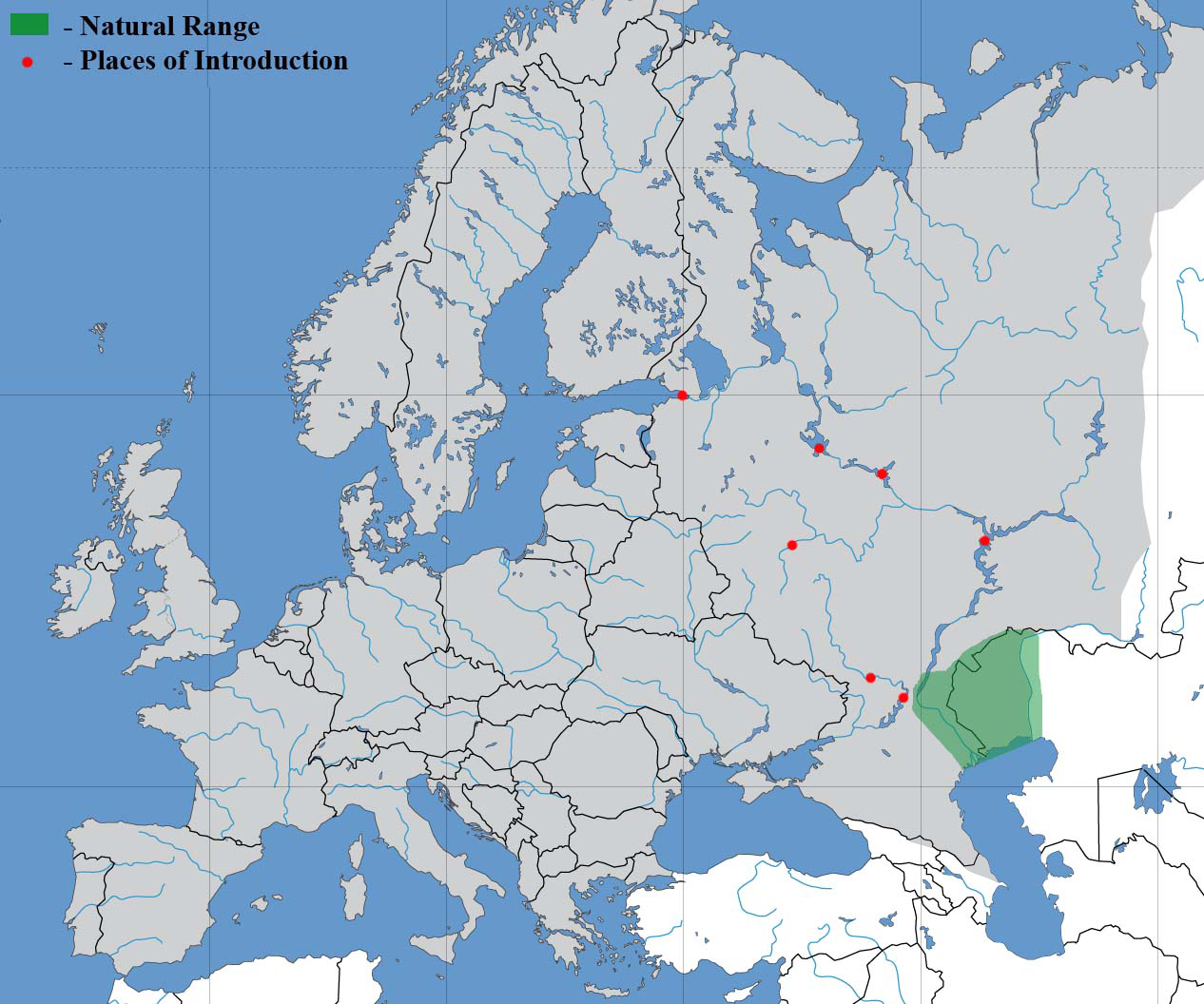
- Suggested range of P. semipellucidus

Synonyms
- Gobius semipellucidus Kessler, 1877

= Proterorhinus semipellucidus =

Species of fish

Proterorhinus semipellucidus is a species of gobiid fish, a tubenose goby originally described from the Gharasu River near Gorgan Bay of the Caspian Sea in Iran. Following the systematic decomposition of the tubenose gobies it was suggested to be a more widespread and invasive taxon distributed in the fresh waters of the Caspian Sea basin. It may be the same species as that known as Proterorhinus nasalis.
