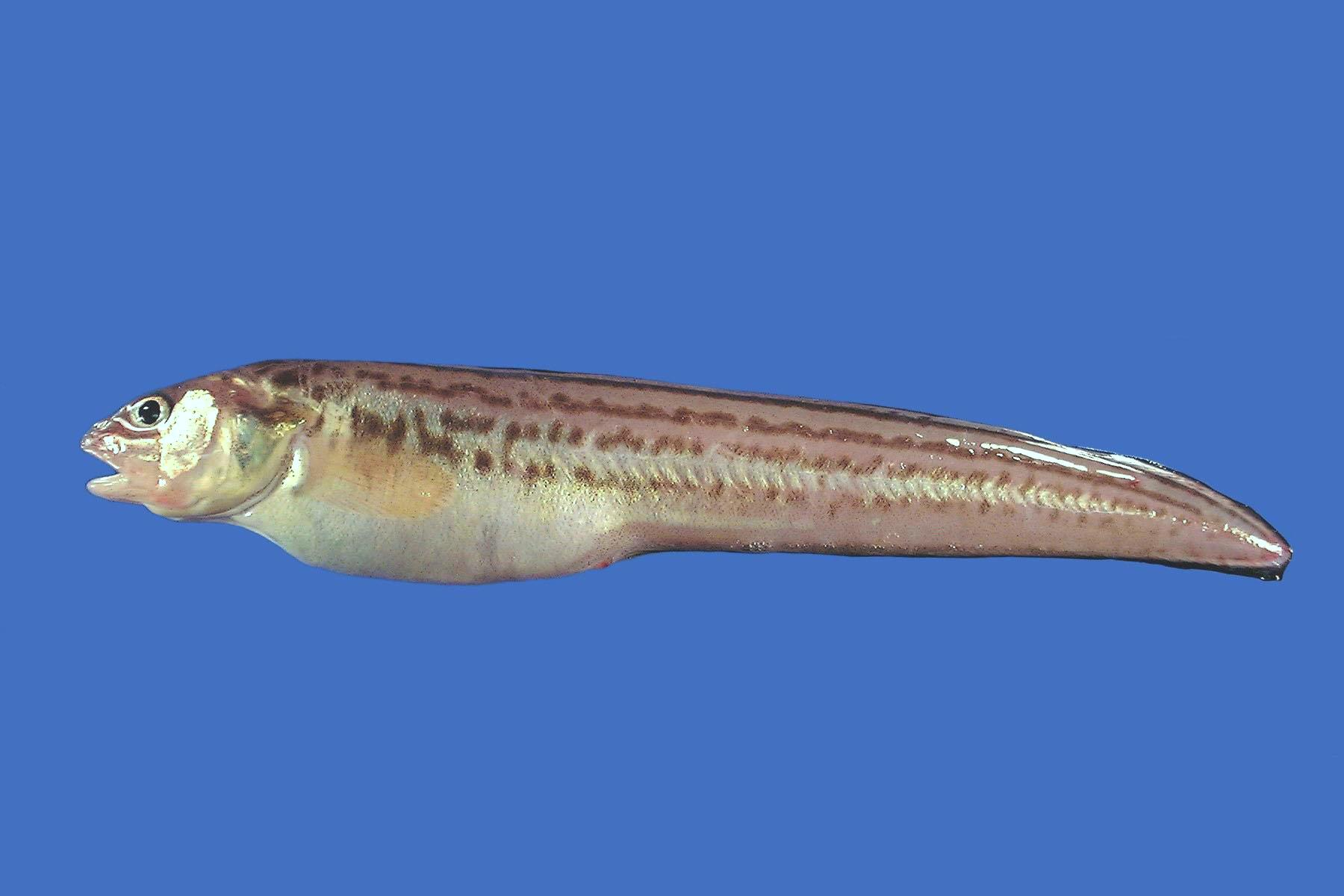

Conservation status
- Least Concern (IUCN 3.1)

Scientific classification
- Kingdom: Animalia
- Phylum: Chordata
- Class: Actinopterygii
- Order: Ophidiiformes
- Family: Ophidiidae
- Genus: Ophidion
- Species: O. josephi

Binomial name
- Ophidion josephi Girard, 1858

Synonyms
- Otophidium welshi Nichols & Breder, 1922; Ophidion welshi (Nichols & Breder, 1922)

= Ophidion josephi =

Species of fish

Ophidion josephi is a fish species in the family Ophidiidae. Widespread in the Western Atlantic from Georgia to Florida, also in the Gulf of Mexico. Marine tropical demersal fish. The specific name josephi refers to St Joseph Island in Texas where the type specimen was collected.

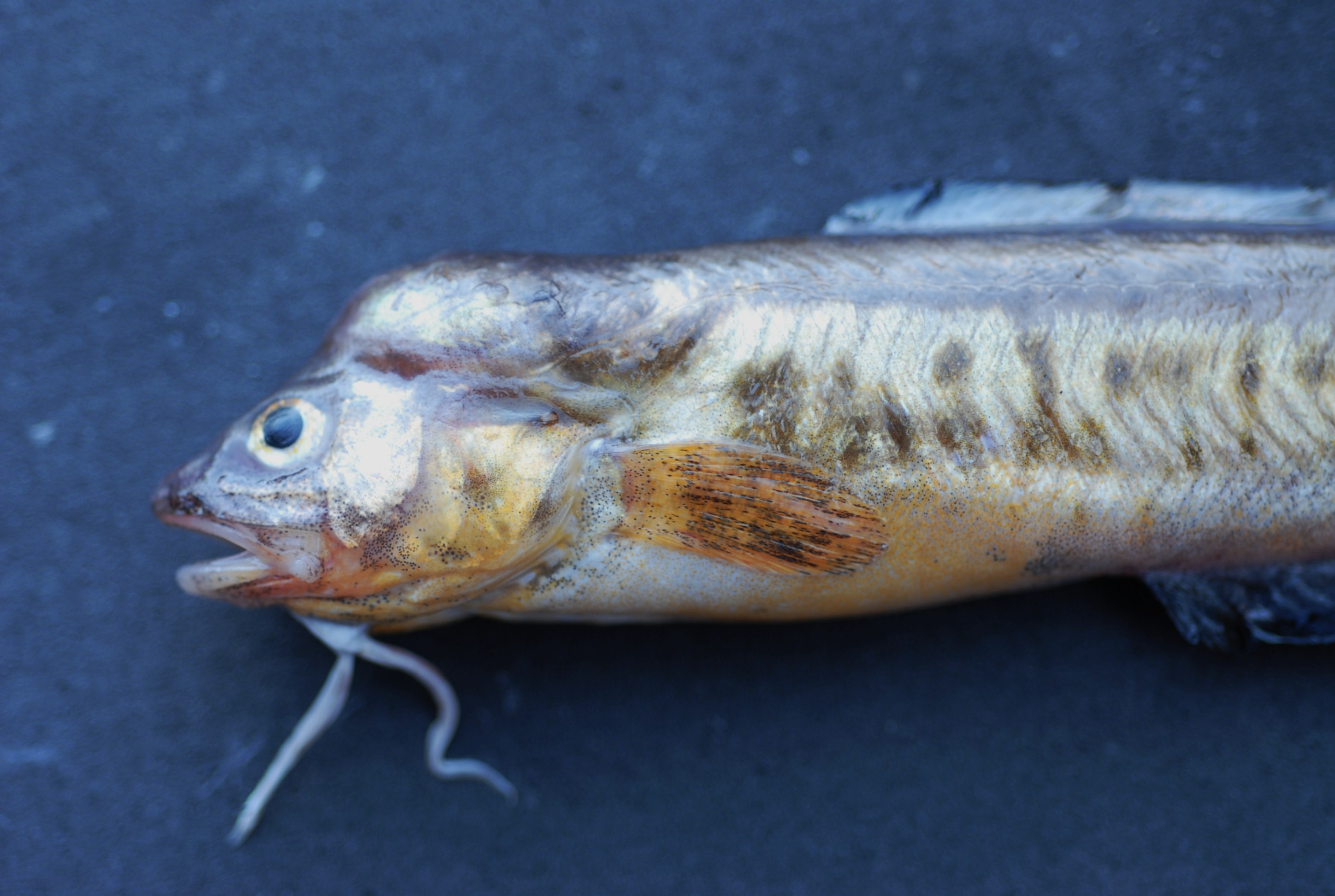
A head of Ophidion josephi
