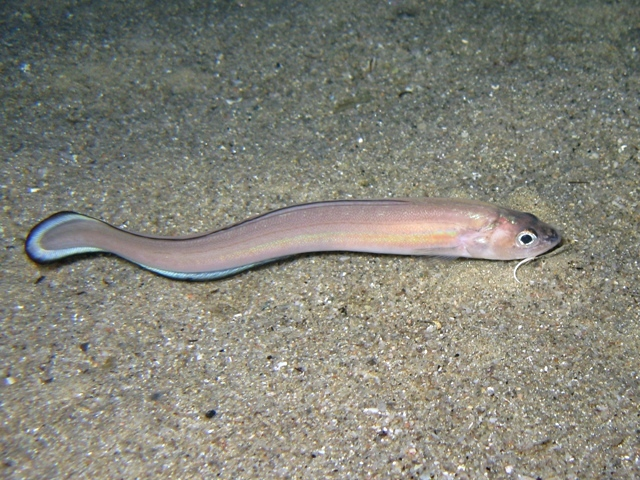
- Ophidion barbatum, Sardinia

Scientific classification
- Kingdom: Animalia
- Phylum: Chordata
- Class: Actinopterygii
- Order: Ophidiiformes
- Family: Ophidiidae
- Subfamily: Ophidiinae; Rafinesque, 1810

= Ophidiinae =

Subfamily of fishes

Ophidiinae is a subfamily of the cusk eel family Ophidiidae. The species in the subfamily are characterised by having their pelvic fins situated far forward on the body and supported by a forward orientated extension of the pelvic girdle, they lack barbels on the mouth and chin and they are covered in small cycloid scales arranged in horizontal or diagonal rows. Some species have a modified swim bladder and the anterior vertebrae which enables them to generate sounds. and some of these modifications are sexually dimorphic and make the fish capable of generating sound. They have two rays in each ventral fin and the caudal fin has 9 rays. Most species are benthic and occur on the continental shelf.

== Genera ==
The following genera are classified under the Ophidiinae:

- Cherublemma Trotter, 1926
- Chilara Jordan & Evermann, 1896
- Genypterus Philippi, 1857
- Lepophidium Gill, 1895
- Ophidion Linnaeus, 1758
- Otophidium Gill, 1885
- Parophidion Tortonese, 1954
- Raneya Robins, 1961
