= Paracanthocephaloides =

Scientific classification
- Kingdom: Animalia
- Phylum: Acanthocephala
- Class: Palaeacanthocephala
- Order: Echinorhynchida
- Family: Arhythmacanthidae
- Genus: Paracanthocephaloides; Golvan, 1969

Type species
- P. chabanaudi Golvan, 1969

Genus of parasitic worms

Paracanthocephaloides is a genus in Acanthocephala (thorny-headed worms, also known as spiny-headed worms).

== Taxonomy ==
The genus was described by Golvan in 1969. The National Center for Biotechnology Information does not indicate that any phylogenetic analysis has been published on any Paracanthocephaloides species that would confirm its position as a unique order in the family Arhythmacanthidae. P. chabanaudi is the type species.

== Description ==
Paracanthocephaloides species consist of a proboscis covered in hooks and a long trunk without spines.

== Species ==
The genus Paracanthocephaloides Golvan, 1969 contains six species.

- Paracanthocephaloides bartonae Smales, 2022

Found in Australia and has 14 to 16 rows of 3 large, 7 spiniform hooks on their proboscis.

- Paracanthocephaloides chabanaudi (Dollfus, 1951)
- Paracanthocephaloides hustoni Smales, 2022

Found in Australia and has 12 rows of five to six hooks, two of which are large, and three to four are spiniform.

- Paracanthocephaloides incrassatus (Molin, 1858) Meyer, 1932
- Paracanthocephaloides shamsiae Smales, 2022

Found in Australia and has 12 rows of five to six hooks, two of which are large, and three to four are spiniform.

- Paracanthocephaloides tripathii Golvan, 1969

== Distribution ==
The distribution of Paracanthocephaloides is determined by that of its hosts.

== Hosts ==
Life cycle of Acanthocephala. (Note: There are no known aberrant human infections for Paracanthocephaloides species.)

The life cycle of an acanthocephalan consists of three stages beginning when an infective acanthor (development of an egg) is released from the intestines of the definitive host and then ingested by an arthropod, the intermediate host. Although the intermediate hosts of Paracanthocephaloides are ???. When the acanthor molts, the second stage called the acanthella begins. This stage involves penetrating the wall of the mesenteron or the intestine of the intermediate host and growing. The final stage is the infective cystacanth which is the larval or juvenile state of an Acanthocephalan, differing from the adult only in size and stage of sexual development. The cystacanths within the intermediate hosts are consumed by the definitive host, usually attaching to the walls of the intestines, and as adults they reproduce sexually in the intestines. The acanthor is passed in the feces of the definitive host and the cycle repeats. There may be paratenic hosts (hosts where parasites infest but do not undergo larval development or sexual reproduction) for Paracanthocephaloides.

Paracanthocephaloides parasitizes animals. There are no reported cases of Paracanthocephaloides infesting humans in the English language medical literature.

Hosts for Paracanthocephaloides species
