= Rainbow cusk eel =

Conservation status
- Least Concern (IUCN 3.1)

Scientific classification
- Kingdom: Animalia
- Phylum: Chordata
- Class: Actinopterygii
- Order: Ophidiiformes
- Family: Ophidiidae
- Genus: Ophidion
- Species: O. iris

Binomial name
- Ophidion iris Breder, 1936

Synonyms
- Ophidion nigracauda Breder, 1936

Species of fish

The brighteye cusk-eel (Ophidion iris) or rainbow cusk eel, is a fish species in the family Ophidiidae. Widespread in the Gulf of California and adjacent offshores along the coast of Mexico to Banderas Bay. Marine subtropical demersal fish, up to 25 cm (9.8 in) long.
