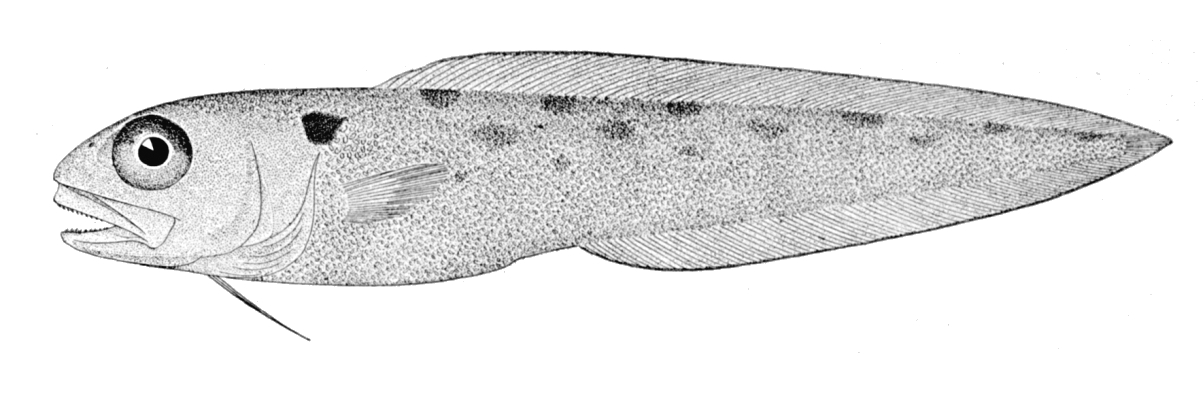

Conservation status
- Least Concern (IUCN 3.1)

Scientific classification
- Kingdom: Animalia
- Phylum: Chordata
- Class: Actinopterygii
- Order: Ophidiiformes
- Family: Ophidiidae
- Genus: Otophidium
- Species: O. omostigma

Binomial name
- Otophidium omostigma (Jordan & Gilbert, 1882)

= Polka-dot cusk-eel =

Species of fish

The polka-dot cusk-eel (Otophidium omostigma), is a species of ray-finned fish found in the Western Atlantic. It's found in subtropical waters around 10 to 50 m (33 to 164 ft) below the surface.

== Description ==
Its body is short and flattened. It has brown colored spots around its body and also a black spot around the gills and the dorsal fin. It's anal fins is broad and black. It maxes out at 12.9 cm (5.1 in).
