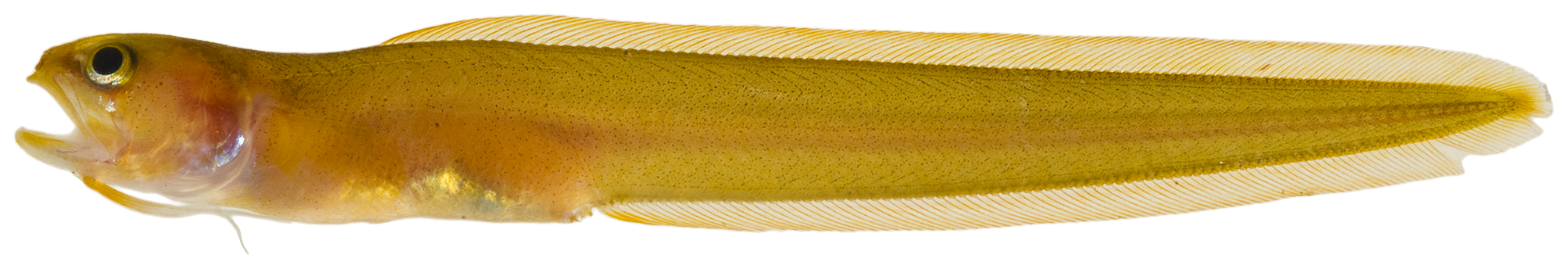
- Parophidion schmidti

Scientific classification
- Kingdom: Animalia
- Phylum: Chordata
- Class: Actinopterygii
- Order: Ophidiiformes
- Family: Ophidiidae
- Subfamily: Ophidiinae
- Genus: Parophidion; Tortonese, 1954

Type species
- Ophidium vassali Risso, 1810

= Parophidion =

Genus of fishes

Parophidion is a genus of cusk-eels found in the Atlantic Ocean and the Mediterranean Sea.

== Species ==
There are currently two recognized species in this genus:

- Parophidion schmidti (Woods & Kanazawa, 1951) (Dusky cusk-eel) - western Atlantic Bermuda to northern South America.
- Parophidion vassali (A. Risso, 1810) - Mediterranean and adjacent areas of the eastern Atlantic.
