= Ophidion asiro =

Scientific classification
- Kingdom: Animalia
- Phylum: Chordata
- Class: Actinopterygii
- Order: Ophidiiformes
- Family: Ophidiidae
- Genus: Ophidion
- Species: O. asiro

Binomial name
- Ophidion asiro (Jordan & Fowler, 1902)

Synonyms
- Otophidium asiro Jordan & Fowler, 1902

Species of fish

Ophidion rochei is a fish species in the family Ophidiidae. Widespread in the northwest Pacific, it is a marine temperate demersal fish, up to 20 centimetres (7.9 in) long.
