= Basketweave cusk-eel =

Conservation status
- Least Concern (IUCN 3.1)

Scientific classification
- Kingdom: Animalia
- Phylum: Chordata
- Class: Actinopterygii
- Order: Ophidiiformes
- Family: Ophidiidae
- Genus: Ophidion
- Species: O. scrippsae

Binomial name
- Ophidion scrippsae (Hubbs, 1916)

Synonyms
- Otophidium scrippsi Hubbs, 1916

Species of fish

The basketweave cusk-eel (Ophidion scrippsae) is a fish species in the family Ophidiidae. It is widespread in the eastern Pacific Ocean from Point Arguello in California, United States, to Baja California. The basketweave cusk-eel is a marine subtropical demersal fish that can be up to 28 centimetres (11 in) long. The specific name honors the journalist and philanthropist Ellen Browning Scripps (1836-1932) one of the founders of the Scripps Research Institute.
