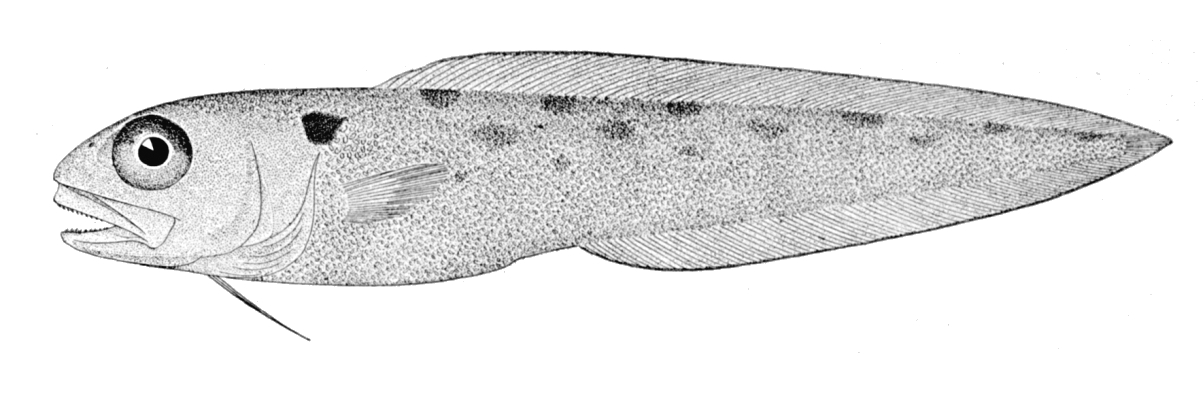
- Polka-dot Cusk-eel (O. omostigma)

Scientific classification
- Kingdom: Animalia
- Phylum: Chordata
- Class: Actinopterygii
- Order: Ophidiiformes
- Family: Ophidiidae
- Subfamily: Ophidiinae
- Genus: Otophidium; T. N. Gill, 1885

Type species
- Genypterus omostigma Jordan & Gilbert, 1882

= Otophidium =

Genus of fishes

Otophidium is a genus of cusk-eels, part of the subfamily Ophidiinae in the family Ophidiidae. They are found in the western Atlantic and eastern Pacific.

== Species ==
There are currently four recognized species in this genus:

- Otophidium chickcharney J. E. Böhlke & Robins, 1959 (Ghost cusk-eel)
- Otophidium dormitator J. E. Böhlke & Robins, 1959 (Sleeper cusk-eel)
- Otophidium indefatigabile D. S. Jordan & Bollman, 1890 (Bighead cusk-eel)
- Otophidium omostigma (D. S. Jordan & C. H. Gilbert, 1882) (Polka-dot cusk-eel)
