= Blackedge cusk =

Scientific classification
- Kingdom: Animalia
- Phylum: Chordata
- Class: Actinopterygii
- Division: Teleostei
- Order: Ophidiiformes
- Family: Ophidiidae
- Genus: Ophidion
- Species: O. muraenolepis

Binomial name
- Ophidion muraenolepis Günther, 1880

Species of fish

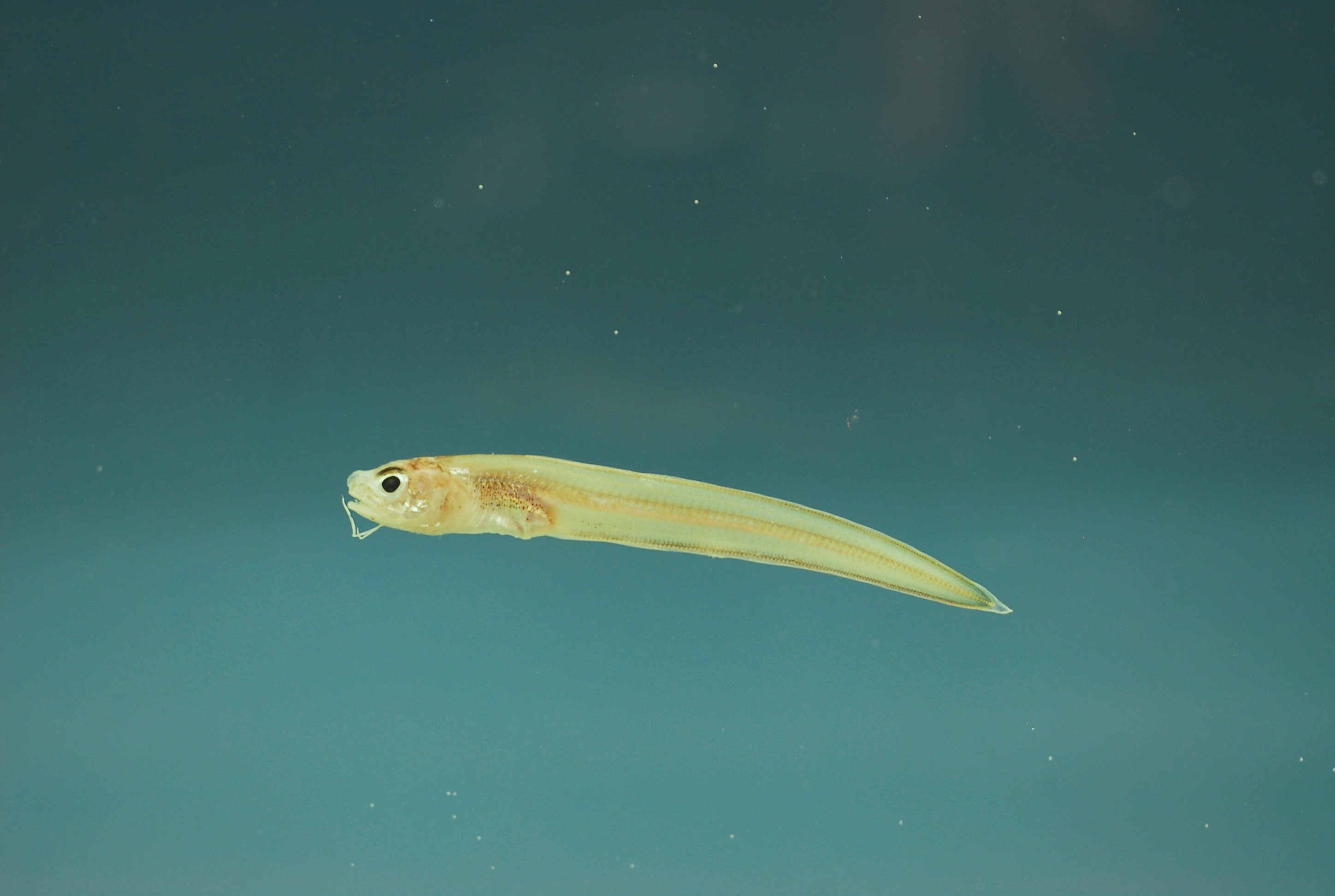
Blackedge cusk-eel.

The blackedge cusk (Ophidion muraenolepis) is a fish species in the family Ophidiidae. It is widespread in the Pacific Ocean from Taiwan and the Arafura Sea to Hawaii, and is a marine subtropical demersal fish, up to 15.5 centimetres (6.1 in) long.
