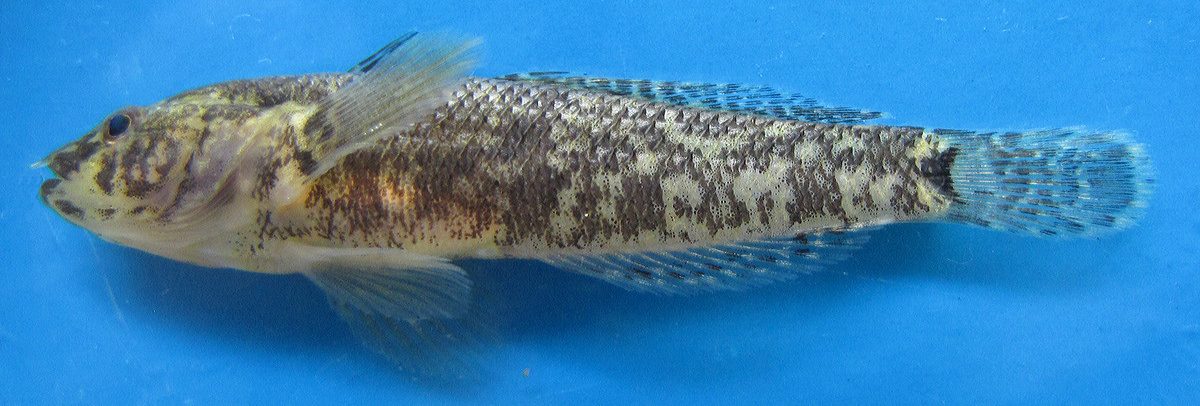

Conservation status
- Least Concern (IUCN 3.1)

Scientific classification
- Kingdom: Animalia
- Phylum: Chordata
- Class: Actinopterygii
- Division: Teleostei
- Order: Gobiiformes
- Family: Gobiidae
- Genus: Proterorhinus
- Species: P. nasalis

Binomial name
- Proterorhinus nasalis (De Filippi, 1863)

Synonyms
- Gobius nasalis De Filippi, 1863

= Eastern tubenose goby =

Species of fish

The eastern tubenose goby (Proterorhinus nasalis) is a species of gobiid fish native to fresh and brackish waters of the basins of the Sea of Azov and the Caspian Sea and has invaded the upper reaches of the Volga River from its native occurrence in the delta. This species prefers slow flowing rivers or still waters with plentiful rocks or vegetation. It can reach a length of 9 centimetres (3.5 in) SL. It is probably the same species as that recently treated as Proterorhinus semipellucidus (or P. cf. semipellucidus).
