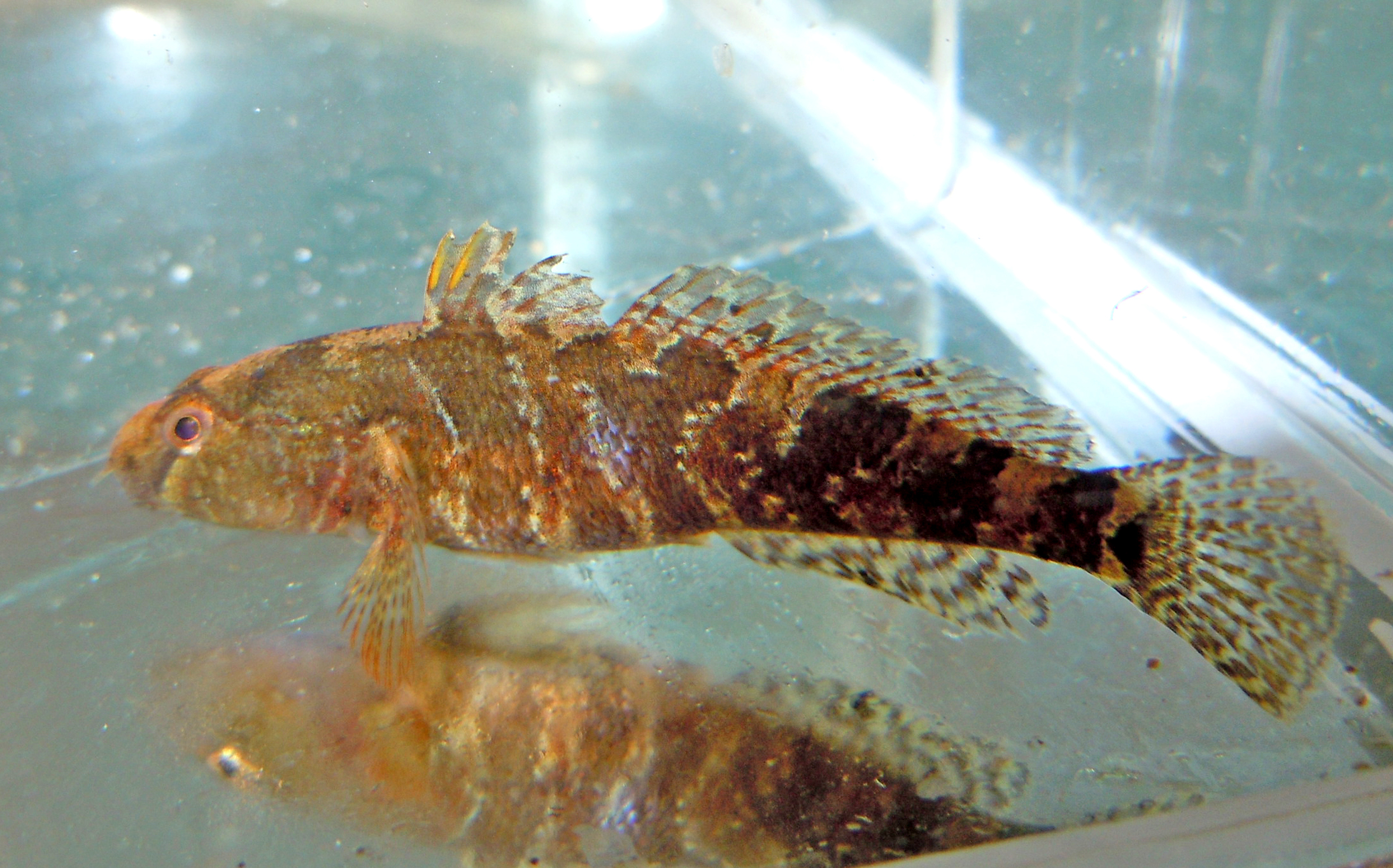
- Tubenose goby (Proterorhinus marmoratus)

Scientific classification
- Kingdom: Animalia
- Phylum: Chordata
- Class: Actinopterygii
- Division: Teleostei
- Order: Gobiiformes
- Family: Gobiidae
- Genus: Proterorhinus; Smitt, 1900

Type species
- Proterorhinus marmoratus Pallas, 1814

= Proterorhinus =

Proterorhinus Temporal range: Middle Miocene to present

Genus of fishes

Proterorhinus is a genus of fishes, known as the tubenose gobies. These gobiid fish are native to Eurasia where they occur in the region of the Caspian and Black seas, inhabiting marine, brackish and fresh waters. The species Proterorhinus semilunaris (previously referred to as P. marmoratus) was introduced to the St. Clair River in Michigan during the late 1990s. Until recently, the genus was considered monotypic, comprising only the tubenose goby (Proterorhinus marmoratus). Following molecular and further morphological investigations it has been split into several taxa, with distinct distributions in marine vs. fresh waters and in the Black Sea vs. Caspian Sea basins.

== Species ==
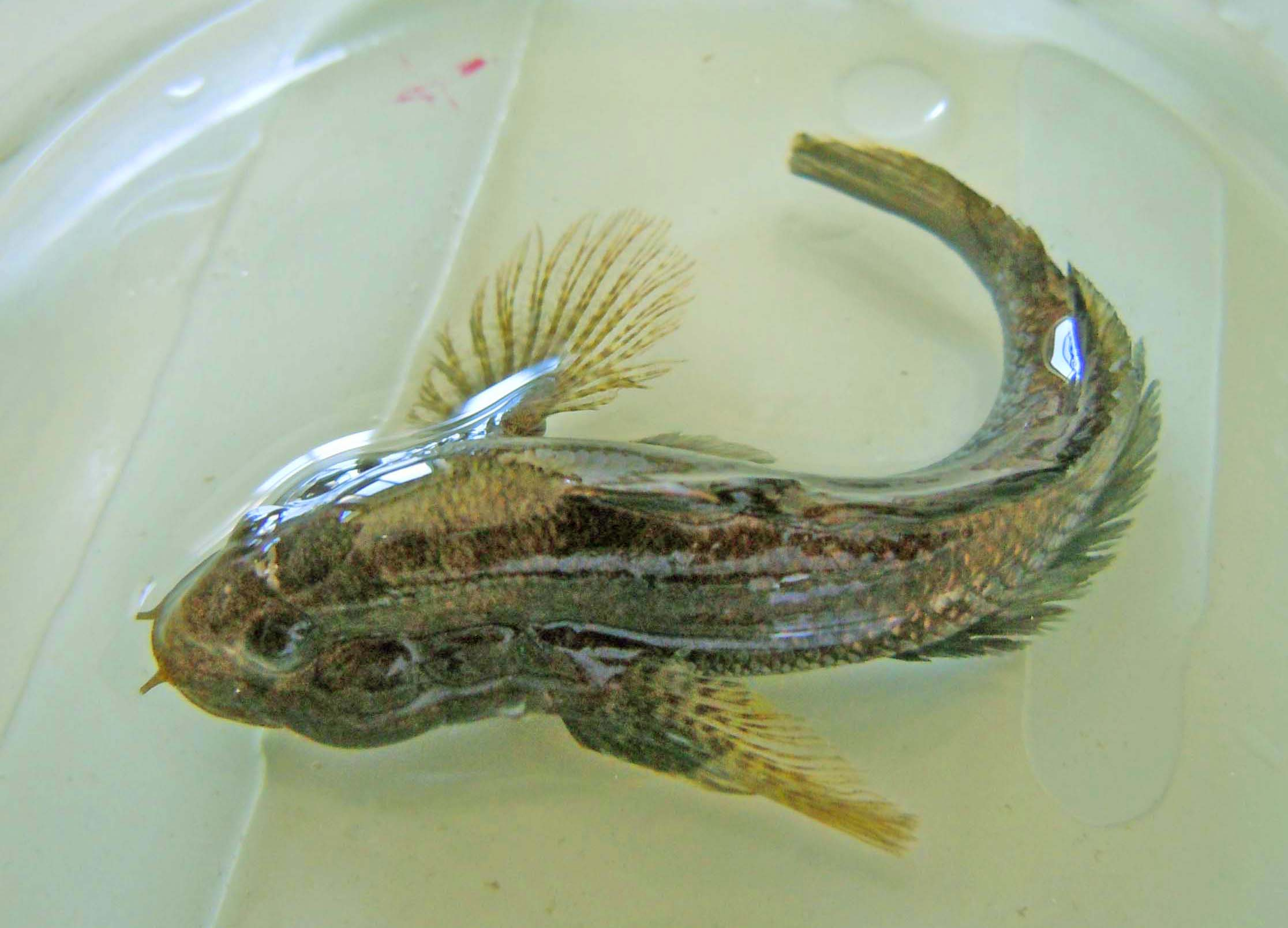
Proterorhinus semilunaris

There are five recognized species in this genus:

- Proterorhinus marmoratus (Pallas, 1814) (tubenose goby)
- Proterorhinus nasalis (De Filippi, 1863) (eastern tubenose goby)
- Proterorhinus semilunaris (Heckel, 1837) (western tubenose goby)
- Proterorhinus semipellucidus (Kessler, 1863) (P. nasalis).
- Proterorhinus tataricus Freyhof & Naseka, 2007 (Chornaya tubenose goby)

A fossil relative, †Proterorhinus vasilievae Schwarzhans, Bradić & Rundić, 2015 is known from the Middle Miocene of Serbia, Austria & Romania.

In the Volga River basin, the tubenose goby has undergone active range expansion since the early 21st century. It is now widely distributed across nearly all reservoirs of the Volga cascade, the unregulated lower reaches of the river, its delta, and the lower reaches of the Kama River. Genetic analyses indicate that the Volga populations belong to the Proterorhinus cf. semipellucidus group, highlighting the complex taxonomic status and ongoing dispersal of this lineage in the region. Due to the unknown location of the holotype for P. semipellucidus and the ongoing taxonomic revision of the genus Proterorhinus (which includes the reinstatement of former synonyms), invasive populations in regions like the Volga River basin are often conservatively designated as Proterorhinus cf. semipellucidus. This "confer" designation reflects the complex cryptic diversity, high genetic variability, and unresolved phylogenetic structure within the tubenose goby complex.
