= Striped cusk-eel =

Conservation status
- Least Concern (IUCN 3.1)

Scientific classification
- Kingdom: Animalia
- Phylum: Chordata
- Class: Actinopterygii
- Order: Ophidiiformes
- Family: Ophidiidae
- Genus: Ophidion
- Species: O. marginatum

Binomial name
- Ophidion marginatum DeKay, 1842

Synonyms
- Ophidium marginatum DeKay, 1842; Rissola marginata (DeKay, 1842)

Species of fish

The striped cusk-eel (Ophidion marginatum) is a species of fish in the family Ophidiidae. It is found in the northwest Atlantic.

== Description ==
The striped cusk-eel is named as such due to its lateral line, which stops before the base of the tail and has a noticeably different shade than the rest of its body, which is a gray-green shade.

This species has an elongated, laterally compressed body with the profile of the head being almost straight from the tip of the moderately pointed snout to behind its eye. The snout just points beyond the mouth and has a spine projecting down near its tip. The male has a prominent crest on the nape. The dorsal and anal fins are joined to the caudal fin. The dorsal fin has 147–158 rays, the anal fin 118–124 rays and each pelvic fin has two rays of unequal length and inserted under eye. The scales are smooth and elongated, they do not overlap and there are none on the head. It is grey-green above, golden on the flanks and white below; there are 2–3 dark stripes along the entire length of the body with one along the lateral line. The side of head has brown spots, the dorsal is fin pale green with a black margin and the anal fin also has a black margin.

It can grow up to 25 centimetres (9.8 in) long.

== Distribution and habitat ==
The striped cusk eel occurs from the northern Atlantic waters off the United States, ranging from New England to northeastern Florida. Larvae occupy the continental shelf of the United States, while a mixture of larvae and juveniles have been reported to occur in estuaries from Barnegat to Chesapeake Bay.

== Biology ==
The stripe cusk-eel is a benthic species which burrows tail first into soft substrates such as sand or mud. They remain hidden during the day and come out of their burrows at night to hunt. They occur in inshore waters in Spring and Fall but their wintering habits are little known, they may move offshore or they may be inactive and remain buried in the substrate. They feed on small crustaceans and fishes smaller than themselves.

The swim bladder, anterior vertebrae and the dorsal cranial muscles have been modified to form a drum like sound generator, this is sexually dimorphic with the apparatus being different in each sex. Older juvenile and adult males show a lump on the head caused by hypertrophy of the muscles used to make the drumming sounds they use in courtship. Spawning for the striped cusk eel begins in the summer. Courting and spawning rituals include the creation of sound and close, synchronized movements from a breeding pair. Females can release small containers of eggs nightly for up to two months after the breeding process has finished.
