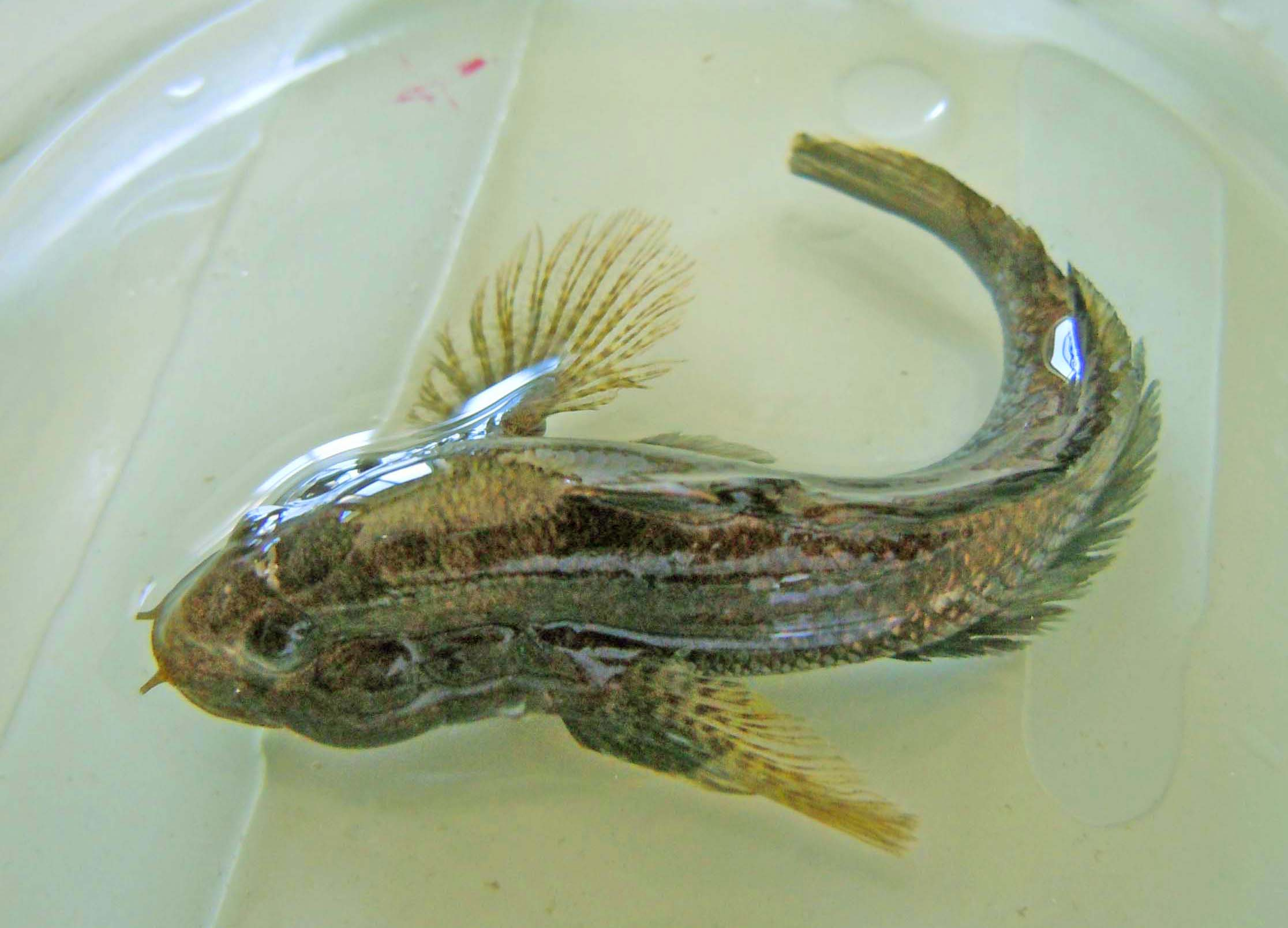
- P. semilunaris from the Baraboy River, southern Ukraine

Conservation status
- Least Concern (IUCN 3.1)

Scientific classification
- Kingdom: Animalia
- Phylum: Chordata
- Class: Actinopterygii
- Order: Gobiiformes
- Family: Gobiidae
- Genus: Proterorhinus
- Species: P. semilunaris

Binomial name
- Proterorhinus semilunaris (Heckel, 1837)
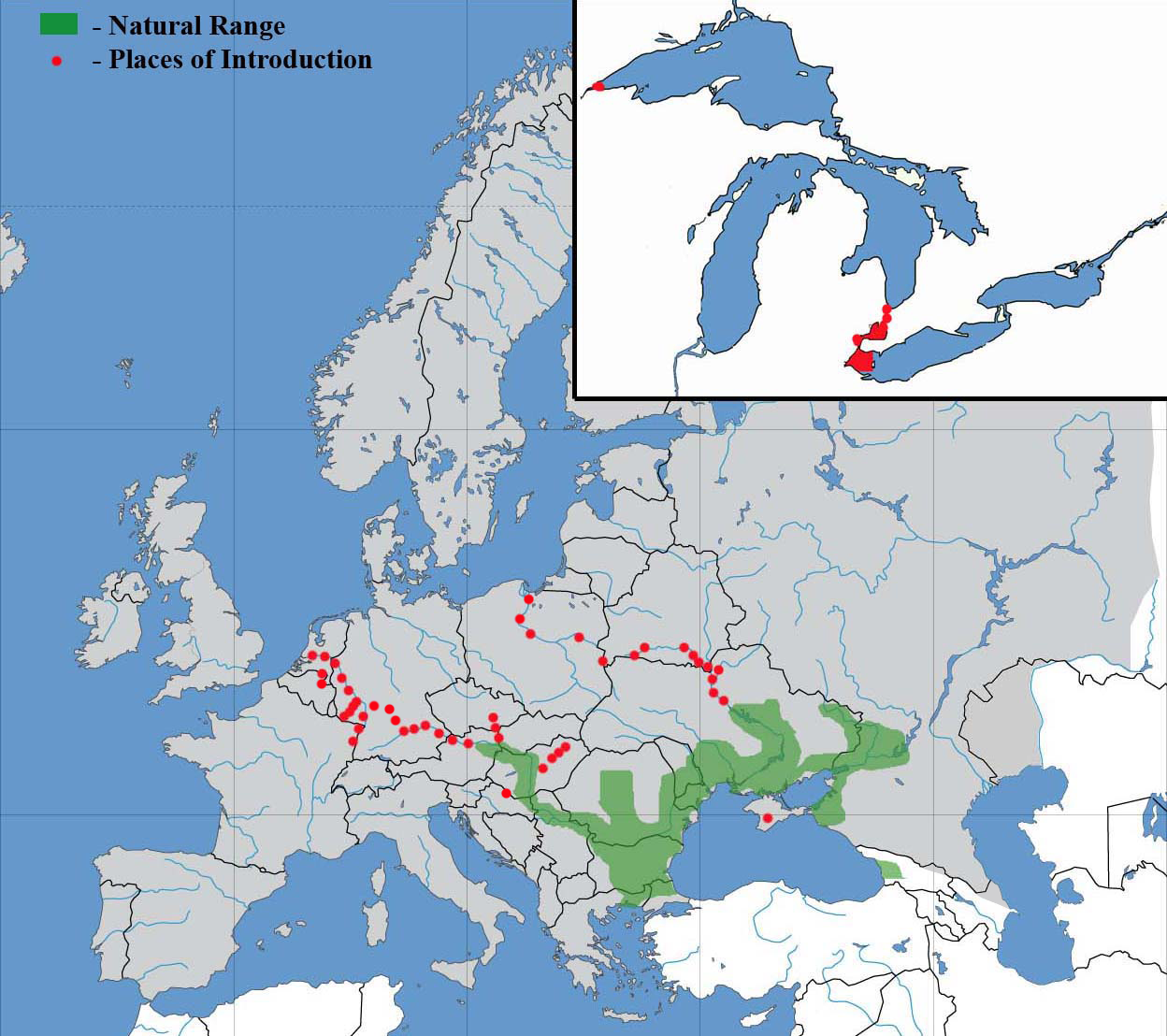
- The range of the western tubenose goby. Initial introduction in North America shown, see the map below for further spread.

Synonyms
- Gobius semilunaris Heckel, 1837

= Western tubenose goby =

Species of fish

The western tubenose goby (Proterorhinus semilunaris) is a species of goby native to fresh waters of the Black Sea and Aegean Sea basins. It has recently spread as an invasive species to Central and Western Europe and to North America. Previously Proterorhinus semilunaris was considered as a junior synonym of Proterorhinus marmoratus, but was confirmed as a distinct species based on molecular analysis.

== Description ==
The species average size is 12.7 centimeters. The body and head is flattened laterally. It has 37–46 large, cycloid scales. Its jaws are equal by length. It has an abdominal sucker without explicit blades. It has no swim bladder. The head's width is usually less than its height. Crown, nape, upper edges of operculums, origins of pectoral fins, belly, and posterior part of throat are covered with cycloid scales. Body color is brown to yellowish-gray with 4–5 dark streaks on back, transforming to spots below the middle of the body. Its fins are typically striped. It reaches 12 centimeters (4.7 in). It differs from the closely related marine tubenose goby P. marmoratus by the head length, which constitutes 28–32% of the fish's standard length. The posterior membrane of first dorsal fin reaches the origin of the second dorsal fin. Arterior naris reaches the upper lip or uppermost margin of the lower lip. Eye diameter is 16–21% of head length.

The tubenose gobies have a cylindrical body with a flattened ventral surface. The mouth is wide and slightly subterminal mouth with large lips and no barbels. The first dorsal fin has 7 or 8 spines. The caudal fin is rounded and has a triangular black spot at its base. The ventral fins are fused into a single suction cup shape. The scales are small and cover the top of the head, behind the eyes, and along the midline. The back and sides have broad, oblique blotches on a lighter brown or olive background. The bottom of the fish is cream to white in color. This species lacks scales on its lateral line. The rows above the lateral line have 45 to 48 scales. The tubenose goby is flattened on the ventral surface.

The nostril tubes, from which these gobies get their name, distinguish the tubenose goby from the round goby. The western tubenose goby have tubular nostrils and its nostril tube extends to the upper lip. The tubular nostril is 2–4 centimetres (0.79–1.57 in) long. The round goby lacks these nostril tubes. It can also be distinguished by its long anterior nostrils and lack of a black spot on the posterior base of its dorsal fin.

== Range ==
=== Natural range ===
The species is native to the fresh waters of the Black Sea basin and the Maritza and Struma rivers draining the Aegean Sea. It inhabits the Danube River from the delta to the mouth Morava and in the Danube Lakes, from Prut to Iași. In Bulgaria, it lives in the Kamchiya, Ropotamo, Veleka, and Rezovska rivers. It inhabits the basins of the Dniester and Southern Bug rivers. In the Dnieper river the natural range is from the estuary to Trubizh River. In the basin of the Sea of Azov it lives in the rivers Don, Seversky Donets (to Sviatohirsk), in the estuary of the Kuban River. It also inhabits Lake Neusiedler.

=== Invasive range ===
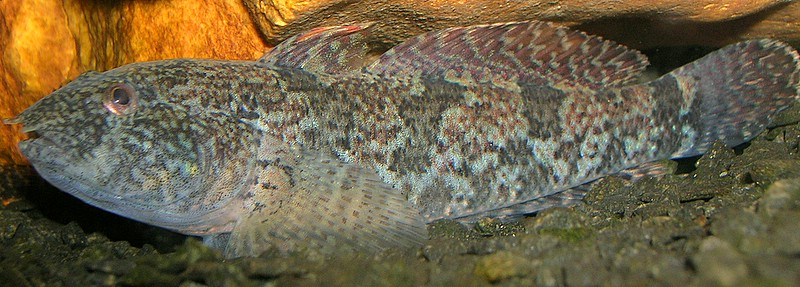
Western tubenose goby from the Netherlands

In Eurasia it is mentioned as non-indigenous in the upper streams of the Danube river, the Dnieper river, the Rhine-Main system (North Sea basin), and the Vistula. During the period of 2008–2010, this species was registered in the Meuse River on the border between Belgium and Netherlands.

Proterorhinus semilunaris was introduced to the St. Clair River from eastern Europe in Ballast water. It is possible that it spread to Canada and the Great Lakes through use of it as live bait. By the early 2000s it had spread north to the Minnesota-Wisconsin border and East to the border of New York and Pennsylvania.

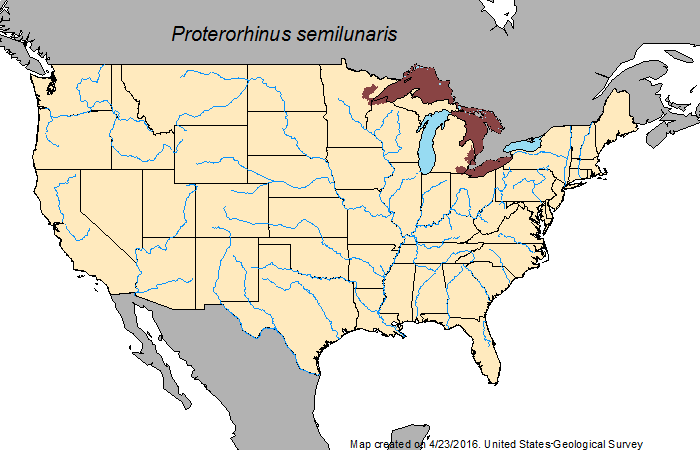
Range of Proterorhinus semilunaris in North America (2016). Following initial introduction into the St. Clair River in Michigan, it has spread through 3 of the 5 Great Lakes. In Lake Superior it is found near the harbour of Duluth.

== Conservation status ==
The (western) tubenose goby is considered an invasive species in North America, but in certain Eurasian locations, the native tubenose goby is considered to be endangered. Particularly in Greece the populations are endangered near the town of Serres due to pollution and human-induced habitat change.

== Ecology ==
=== Habitat ===
Proterorhinus semilunaris inhabit freshwater areas. They live in regions with much plant cover in lakes and rivers. They will inhabit shallow (less than 5 meter depth), slow moving, shore water. They will be found in areas with abundant macrophytes.

Tubenose gobies in the Detroit River are positively associated with complex macrophytes in the fall. They are negatively associated with the macrophytes in the spring and summer. They can withstand extremely low levels of dissolved oxygen.

Tubenose goby will create nests under rocks and logs in shallow water, and defend its nest sites quite aggressively. The preferred nesting areas indicate that they could potentially inhabit the shallow waters of all five Great Lakes. Currently, the species is not spreading rapidly, however, if the species does expand it could be a threat to native species of the Great Lakes.

=== Feeding ===
The species is a benthic omnivore (demersal fish). It consumes a large number of benthic invertebrates, such as Chironomidaes, crustaceans, copepods, and ostracods. Gobies will also eat fish larvae; this can negatively impact the ecosystem of the rivers and lakes that tubenose gobies inhabit.

In the Věstonice Reservoir (Thaya River, the basin of the Morava River) the larvae of Chironomidae, mostly Phytotendipes gripekoveni comprise 40.2% and Asellus aquaticus 27.6% as well as Corixidae, copepods, Ceratopogonidae, Cladocera, and leeches (Hirudinea).

=== Reproduction and life cycle ===
The life span of the female Proterorhinus semilunaris can be up to 5 years. Meanwhile, the males generally do not live as long. The males will guard their nesting sites to defend their eggs and young. Tubenose gobies will nest under logs and rocks in the shallow fresh waters of the Great Lakes and their connecting rivers. The gobies will spawn multiple times during the warmer months of the year which makes the species rather prolific. Currently, the species is not rapidly spreading but the prolific spawning could create a threat to the native species of rainbow darters and Northern madtoms.

=== Parasites ===
Infestation is low in the natural range. In the delta of the Dniester River they have 5 parasite species; trematodes Nicolla skrjabini are most numerous. In the small rivers of the northern coast of the Sea of Azov it has trematodes Plagioporus skrjabini and glochidia of molluscs.

After introduction, the tubenose goby in the Morava River have 13 parasite species; the trematodes, such as Apatemon cobitidis proterorhini, Diplostomum spathaceum, Tylodelphys clavata, were most numerous in the parasite community. In the Great Lakes the introduced tubenose goby was infected with 6 parasite species, but the infestation with every particular species was very low. It is included as paratenic host to the life cycle of the parasite of turtles, the nematode Spiroxys contortus.

=== Ecological impact and importance ===
The North American tubenose goby has a significant overlap in diet with the rainbow darter, northern madtom, and the logperch, which creates competition with these species in their native habitat.

The western tubenose goby is an invasive species but it has not spread to the extent of the round goby. The tubenose goby has the potential to threaten the natural species of the Great Lakes. Many native predatory fish feed on the tubenose goby which disrupts the native food webs of the Great Lakes
