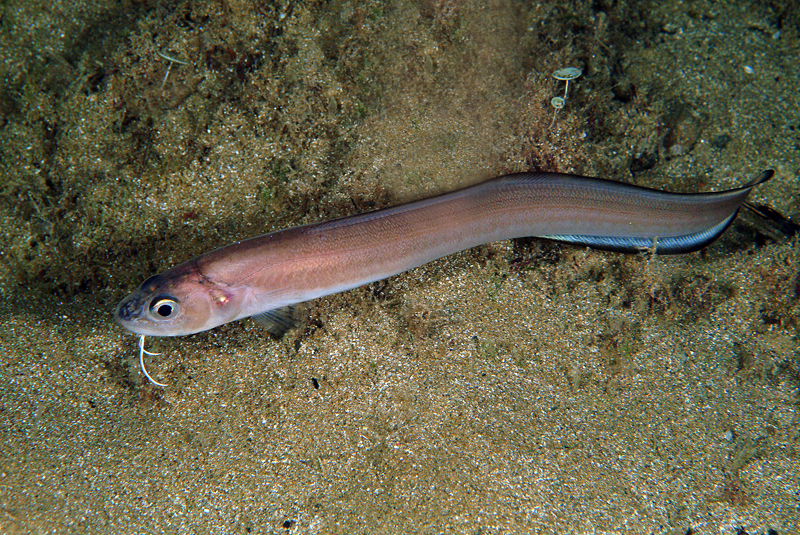
- Snake blenny (O. barbatum)

Scientific classification
- Kingdom: Animalia
- Phylum: Chordata
- Class: Actinopterygii
- Division: Teleostei
- Order: Ophidiiformes
- Family: Ophidiidae
- Subfamily: Ophidiinae
- Genus: Ophidion; Linnaeus, 1758

Type species
- Ophidion barbatum Linnaeus, 1758

Synonyms
- Rissola Jordan & Evermann, 1896

= Ophidion (fish) =

Genus of fishes

Ophidion is a genus of cusk-eels.

== Species ==
There are currently 29 recognized species in this genus:

- Ophidion antipholus R. N. Lea & C. R. Robins, 2003 (Longnose cusk-eel)
- Ophidion asiro (D. S. Jordan & Fowler, 1902)
- Ophidion barbatum Linnaeus, 1758 (Snake blenny)
- Ophidion dromio R. N. Lea & C. R. Robins, 2003 (Shorthead cusk-eel)
- Ophidion exul C. R. Robins, 1991
- Ophidion fulvum (Hildebrand & F. O. Barton, 1949) (Earspot cusk-eel)
- Ophidion galapagensis
- Ophidion galeoides (C. H. Gilbert, 1890) (Striped cusk-eel)
- Ophidion genyopus (J. D. Ogilby, 1897) (Ravenous cusk)
- Ophidion grayi (Fowler, 1948) (Blotched cusk-eel)
- Ophidion guianense R. N. Lea & C. R. Robins, 2003 (Guianan cusk-eel)
- Ophidion holbrookii Putnam, 1874 (Band cusk-eel)
- Ophidion imitator R. N. Lea, 1997 (Mimic cusk-eel)
- Ophidion iris Breder, 1936 (Rainbow cusk-eel)
- Ophidion josephi Girard, 1858
- Ophidion lagochila (J. E. Böhlke & C. R. Robins, 1959) (Harelip cusk)
- Ophidion lozanoi Matallanas, 1990
- Ophidion marginatum DeKay, 1842 (Striped cusk-eel)
- Ophidion metoecus C. R. Robins, 1991
- Ophidion muraenolepis Günther, 1880 (Blackedge cusk)
- Ophidion nocomis C. R. Robins & J. E. Böhlke, 1959 (Letter opener)
- Ophidion puck R. N. Lea & C. R. Robins, 2003 (Pallid cusk-eel)
- Ophidion robinsi Fahay, 1992 (Colonial cusk-eel)
- Ophidion rochei J. P. Müller, 1845 (Roche's snake blenny)
- Ophidion saldanhai Matallanas & Brito, 1999
- Ophidion scrippsae (C. L. Hubbs, 1916) (Basketweave cusk-eel)
- Ophidion selenops C. R. Robins & J. E. Böhlke, 1959 (Mooneye cusk-eel)
- Ophidion smithi (Fowler, 1934)
- Ophidion welshi (Nichols & Breder, 1922) (Crested cusk-eel)
- Ophidion zavalai Rotundo, Caires, Oliveira, Kuranaka, Figueiredo-Filho & Marceniuk 2023
