= Cherublemma =

Conservation status
- Least Concern (IUCN 3.1)

Scientific classification
- Kingdom: Animalia
- Phylum: Chordata
- Class: Actinopterygii
- Order: Ophidiiformes
- Family: Ophidiidae
- Subfamily: Ophidiinae
- Genus: Cherublemma; Trotter, 1890
- Species: C. emmelas

Binomial name
- Cherublemma emmelas (C. H. Gilbert, 1890)

Synonyms
- Leptophidium emmelas Gilbert, 1890; Brotuloides emmelas (Gilbert, 1890); Cherublemma lelepris Trotter, 1926

Species of fish

Cherublemma emmelas, the black brotula, is a species of cusk-eel found along the Pacific coast of Central and South America from Baja California to Chile. It occurs at depths of from 102 to 740 metres (335 to 2,428 ft). This species grows to a length of 25 centimetres (9.8 in) SL. It is the only known member of its genus. Many have been found living close to either soft sediments or rocky bottoms in the broad oxygen minimum zone of the Gulf of California, where by unknown means they thrive in conditions with partial pressures of oxygen ranging from 0.1 to 0.15 kPa, which had formerly been assumed to be lethal for any species of fish.
