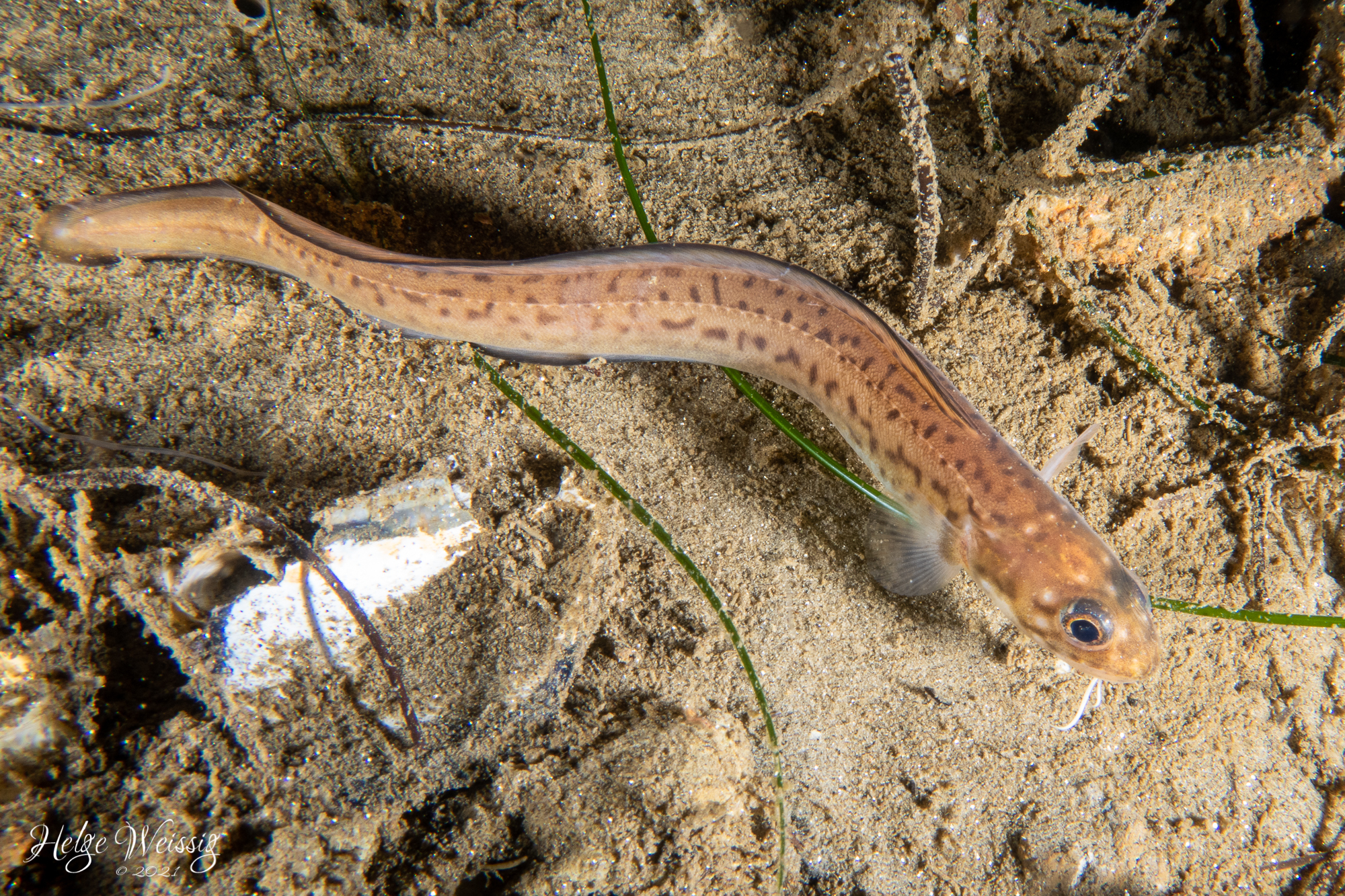

Conservation status
- Least Concern (IUCN 3.1)

Scientific classification
- Kingdom: Animalia
- Phylum: Chordata
- Class: Actinopterygii
- Order: Ophidiiformes
- Family: Ophidiidae
- Subfamily: Ophidiinae
- Genus: Chilara; Jordan & Evermann, 1896
- Species: C. taylori

Binomial name
- Chilara taylori (Girard, 1858)

Synonyms
- Ophidion taylori Girard, 1858; Otophidium taylori (Girard, 1858); Ophidion novaculum Harry, 1951

= Spotted cusk eel =

Species of fish

Chilara taylori, the spotted cusk-eel, is a species of cusk-eel found along the eastern coast of the Pacific Ocean where it is found at depths down to around 280 metres (920 ft) from Washington, United States to Ecuador. This species grows to a length of 40.4 centimetres (15.9 in) TL. It is the only known member of its genus.
