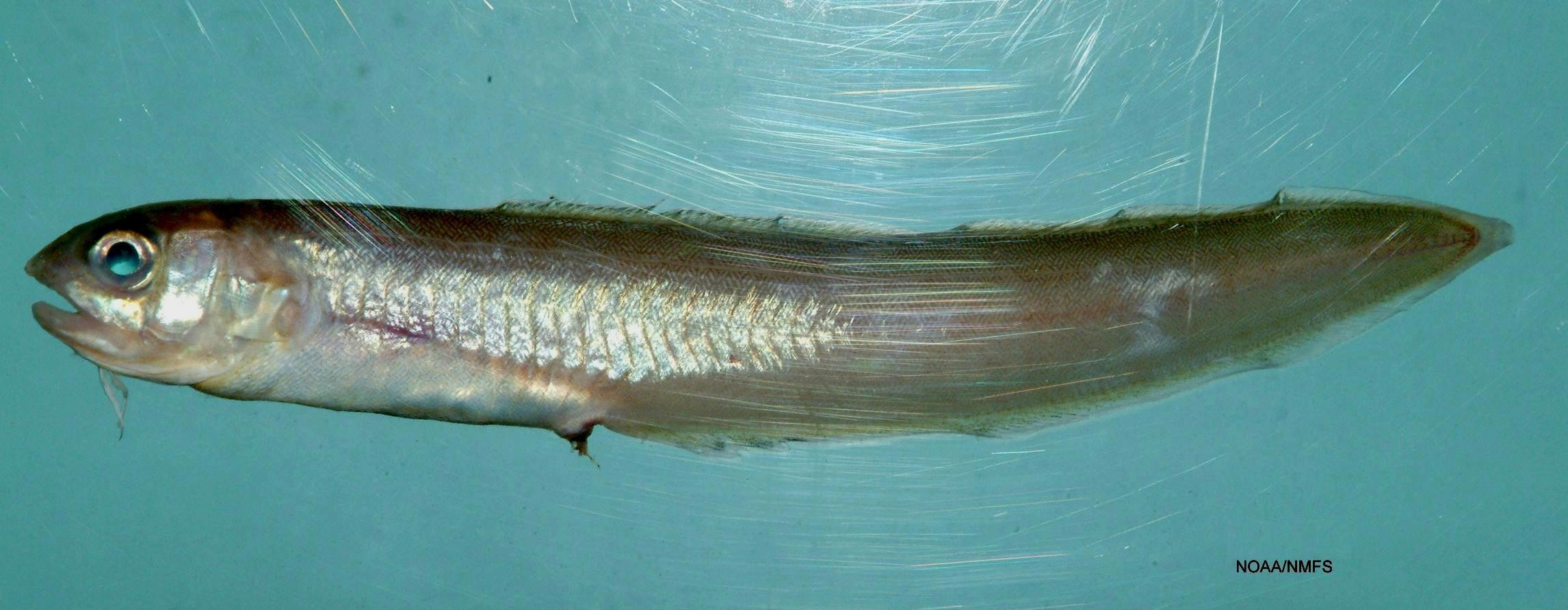

Conservation status
- Least Concern (IUCN 3.1)

Scientific classification
- Kingdom: Animalia
- Phylum: Chordata
- Class: Actinopterygii
- Order: Ophidiiformes
- Family: Ophidiidae
- Genus: Ophidion
- Species: O. holbrookii

Binomial name
- Ophidion holbrookii Putnam, 1874

Synonyms
- Ophidion beani (Jordan & Gilbert, 1883)

= Band cusk-eel =

Species of fish

The band cusk-eel (Ophidion holbrookii) is a fish species in the family Ophidiidae. Widespread in the Western Atlantic from North Carolina, United States, and northern Gulf of Mexico to southeastern Brazil. Absent from The Bahamas. Marine reef-associated tropical demersal fish, up to 30 cm (12 in) long.

Its range under water can be between 0.5–7 m (1.6–23.0 ft), but usually it is found deeper than 18 m (59 ft) below the surface. This species was first seen in the Key West area near Florida, USA in 1874 and described by Frederic Ward Putnam.

== Description ==
Cusk eels are not true eels. Unlike true eels, they have forked ventral fins: organs attached to the pectoral muscles just below the mouth. They do however, like eels, have an attenuate body and tend to have mouths in the terminal position with cardiform teeth.

Though fairly small, the band cusk-eel has a complicated skeletal system. There are 20 ribs to allow for flexibility and 66-69 vertebrae along the spinal cord. This specific variation is a dull tan and lacks scales on the top of the head. The dorsal and anal fins are continuous with the caudal and lined in black. The body is fairly deep and number of rays, used to identify species, varies. The typical range is 117-132 dorsal rays, 97-109 anal, and 19-21 pectoral.

== Morphology ==
In many species the swim bladder is hardened and used for an echo chamber to make sounds. This has been studied in depth in striped cusk eels but is assumed to be indicative of all cusk eels.

Study of the lateral line system in cusk eels has indicated that the paired muscles in the swim bladder added with specialized organs in the head enable the fishes to have enhanced hearing and perception of depth and vibration.

=== Sexual dimorphism ===
Though the color of each sex varies little, in the development of anatomy in band cusk eels there is a noticeable difference. Both have a hardened swim bladder (suggesting that perhaps females use it for sound too) but males alone have a structure called a 'rocker'. All individuals possess a modified first vertebrae that makes a wing-like shape just above the swim bladder. However, in males there is a free floating bone that curves along a modification of the third through sixth vertebrae and attaches to the swim bladder. This is called a rocker but has not been seen in action so the function is unknown. In females this area is not modified and has two hollow protuberances coming directly off of the vertebrae.

== Habitat ==
Cask eels tend to live in the bottom of shallow areas of water and take shelter in anything from caves to other invertebrates. Crevices and mud or sand burrows can be home to solitary fish or groups. A full distribution map of this species has not been made.

== Behavior ==
Little is known about the behavior of cusk eels in general and what is known is not often specific to species. Many cusk eels are known to cohabitate alongside or within the bodies of invertebrates. Most are known to burrow during the day, possibly to conserve energy and/or avoid predators. This burrowing has been caught on video in multiple species and occurs tail first, the fish backing up and down into soft sand or mud until covered. In soniferous species, a loud jackhammer-like sound is emitted by males for the attraction of a mate. They are thought to feed on small invertebrates such as shrimp or worms.

== Reproduction ==
Male band cusk eels lack copulatory organs. As a result, eggs are externally fertilized and kept together in gel-like clumps, which float near the surface. The juveniles are rarely seen except in two studies of multiple dusk-eel variations. One study found larvae near the surface and traveling without sibling companionship. Another found that in certain situations they may cohabitate with other large invertebrates with or without using their companions for food.

== Conservation status ==
The band cusk-eel is assessed as Least Concern under the IUCN Red List of Threatened Species (IUCN 3.1) It is of little interest to fisheries but it is taken as bycatch by shrimp trawlers off Colombia where its flesh is prized and it is sold a La perla.

== Sources ==
- Froese, Rainer; Pauly, Daniel (eds.). "Ophidion holbrookii". FishBase. December 2012 version.
