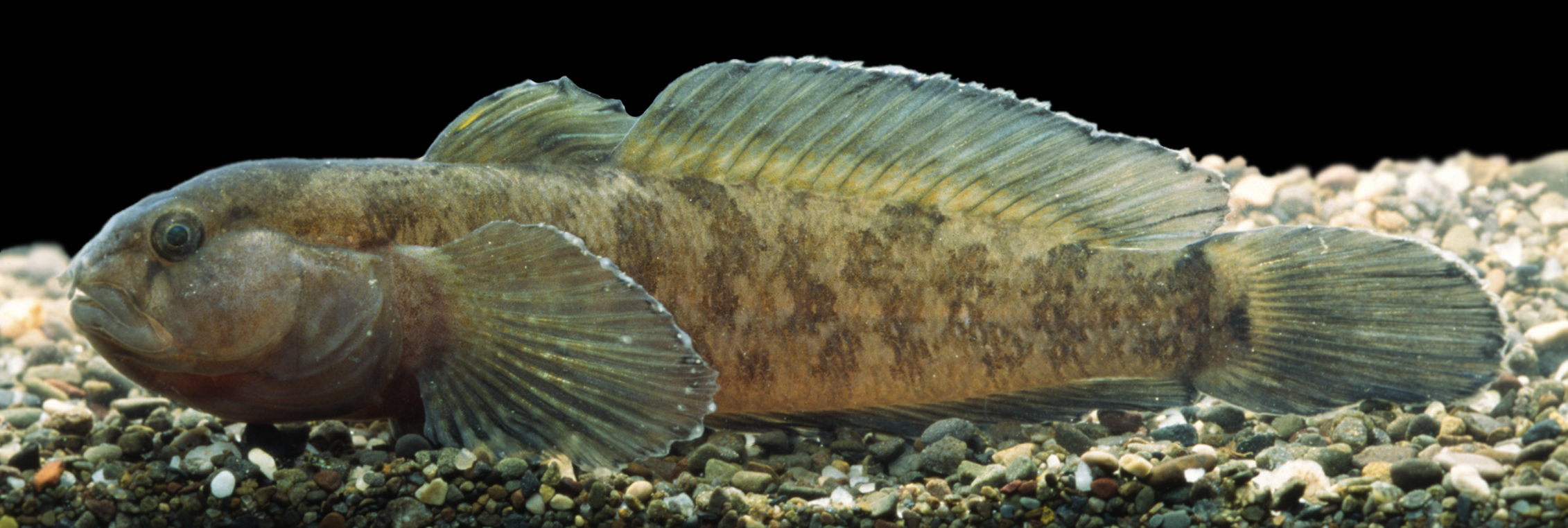

Conservation status
- Critically Endangered (IUCN 3.1)

Scientific classification
- Kingdom: Animalia
- Phylum: Chordata
- Class: Actinopterygii
- Order: Gobiiformes
- Family: Gobiidae
- Genus: Proterorhinus
- Species: P. tataricus

Binomial name
- Proterorhinus tataricus Freyhof & Naseka, 2007

= Chornaya tubenose goby =

Species of fish

The Chornaya tubenose goby (Proterorhinus tataricus) is a species of goby endemic to Crimea, Ukraine where it is only found in a short stretch of River Chornaya. Water is extracted in large quantities for irrigation could cause the stream to completely dry out in summer and thus poses a critical risk of extinction in a near future.
