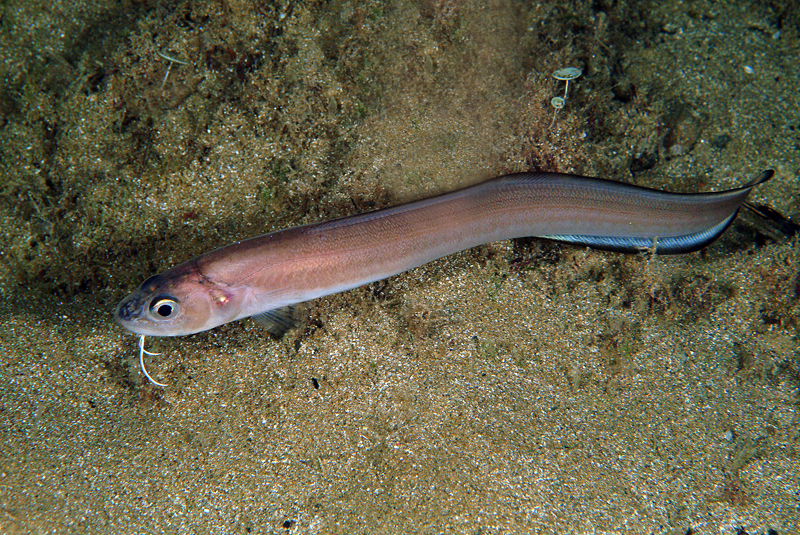

Conservation status
- Least Concern (IUCN 3.1)

Scientific classification
- Kingdom: Animalia
- Phylum: Chordata
- Class: Actinopterygii
- Division: Teleostei
- Order: Ophidiiformes
- Family: Ophidiidae
- Genus: Ophidion
- Species: O. barbatum

Binomial name
- Ophidion barbatum Linnaeus, 1758

Synonyms
- Ophidion congrus, (Gronow ex Gray, 1854); Ophidion maculatum, (Rafinesque, 1810)

= Ophidion barbatum =

Species of fish

Ophidion barbatum, the snake blenny, is a fish species in the family Ophidiidae. It is widespread in the eastern Atlantic from southern England to Senegal in West Africa, and the northern Mediterranean. It is a marine subtropical demersal fish, up to 25 centimetres (9.8 in) long.

== Parasites ==
As most fish, the Snake blenny harbours a variety of parasites. One of them is the diclidophorid monogenean Flexophora ophidii. The species was described in 1962 by Maria Prost and Louis Euzet from the coasts of France in the Mediterranean Sea and found 58 years later off Algeria.
