= Banded cusk-eel =

Conservation status
- Least Concern (IUCN 3.1)

Scientific classification
- Kingdom: Animalia
- Phylum: Chordata
- Class: Actinopterygii
- Order: Ophidiiformes
- Family: Ophidiidae
- Subfamily: Ophidiinae
- Genus: Raneya; C. R. Robins, 1961
- Species: R. brasiliensis

Binomial name
- Raneya brasiliensis (Kaup, 1856)

Synonyms
- Ophidium brasiliense Kaup, 1856; Lepophidium fluminense Miranda-Ribeiro, 1903; Raneya fluminensis (Miranda Ribeiro, 1903)

Species of fish

The banded cusk-eel (Raneya brasiliensis) is a species of cusk-eel found along the southeast coast of South America from southern Brazil to northern Argentina. It occurs at depths of from 40 to 150 metres (130 to 490 ft) and is of minor importance in commercial fisheries. This species grows to a length of 31 centimetres (12 in) TL. It is the only known member of its genus. The generic name honours the American ichthyologist Edward Cowden Raney (1909–1984) of Cornell University who introduced the describer Charles R. Robins to ichthyology.
