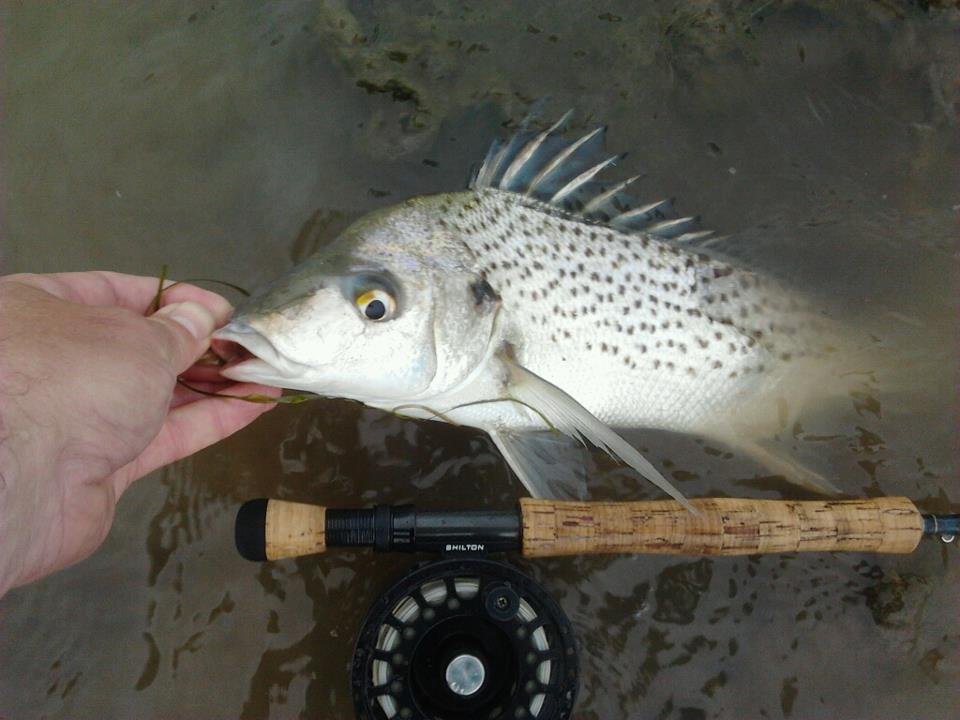
- In South Africa

Conservation status
- Least Concern (IUCN 3.1)

Scientific classification
- Kingdom: Animalia
- Phylum: Chordata
- Class: Actinopterygii
- Order: Acanthuriformes
- Family: Haemulidae
- Genus: Pomadasys
- Species: P. commersonnii

Binomial name
- Pomadasys commersonnii (Lacépède, 1801)

Synonyms
- Labrus commersonnii Lacépède, 1801; Pristipoma operculare Playfair, 1867; Pomadasys operculare (Playfair, 1867); Pomadasys opercularis (Playfair, 1867)

= Pomadasys commersonnii =

Species of fish

Pomadasys commersonnii, the smallspotted grunter, is a species of ray-finned fish, a grunt belonging to the family Haemulidae. It is native to the brackish and marine waters of the western Indian Ocean.

== Description ==
Pomadasys commersonnii has a small mouth with moderately thick lips. there are two pores and a central pit on the chin. The dorsal fin contains 10-11 spines and 14-15 softrays, while the anal fin has 3 spines and 9-10 soft rays. It has a dark grey back fading to silvery white on the underparts, the back and sides are marked with many small brown spots, these are also on the dorsal fin but do not extend to the head. There is a dark spot on the margin of the gill cover and the pelvic and anal fins. This species attains a maximum total length of 80 cm (31 in).

== Distribution ==
Pomadasys commersonnii is found in the western Indian Ocean. It occurs along the eastern coast of Africa from the Gulf of Aden to Cape Point in South Africa, Madagascar and along the Asian coast from Yemen to the Arabian Sea coast of India.

== Habitat and biology ==
Pomadasys commersonnii occurs in shallow coastal waters and estuaries. They spawn at sea and the juveniles settle in estuarine habitats which are used as nursery areas. The adults will also migrate into estuaries from the sea to feed. This species can tolerate freshwater. It feeds on benthic invertebrates such as crustaceans, worms and small bivalves, which it can expose by jetting water into the mud using its mouth. It is an oviparous species, forming distinct pairs to spawn.

== Systematics ==
Pomadasys commersonnii was first formally described as Labrus commersonnii in 1801 by the French naturalist Bernard Germain de Lacépède (1756-1825) with the type locality given as Grand golfe de l'Inde, interpreted as rivers of Madagascar. The specific name honours the French naturalist Philibert Commerçon, whose name is sometimes spelled Commerson, (1727-1773), Lacepède used Commerçon's drawings and notes to base his description on. The specific name argenteus means "silver" and refers to the main colour of this species.

== Utilisation ==
Pomadasys commersonnii is targeted by commercial fisheries using bottom trawls, bottom longlines, gillnets and traps. In South Africa it is banned from sale, only recreational angling is allowed, which is popular. It is a species which may have potential in aquaculture in South Africa.
