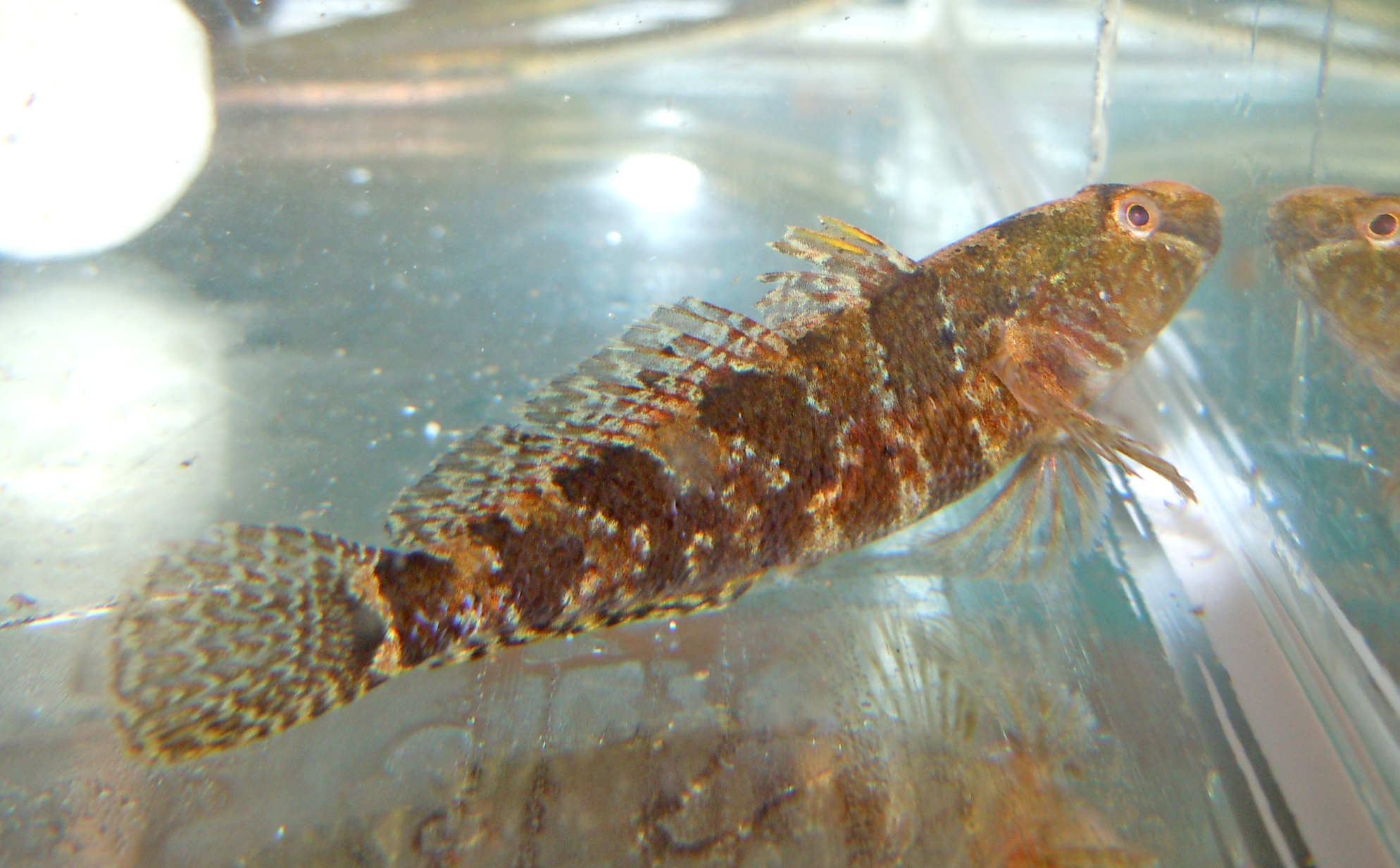

Conservation status
- Near Threatened (IUCN 3.1)

Scientific classification
- Kingdom: Animalia
- Phylum: Chordata
- Class: Actinopterygii
- Division: Teleostei
- Order: Gobiiformes
- Family: Gobiidae
- Genus: Proterorhinus
- Species: P. marmoratus

Binomial name
- Proterorhinus marmoratus (Pallas, 1814)
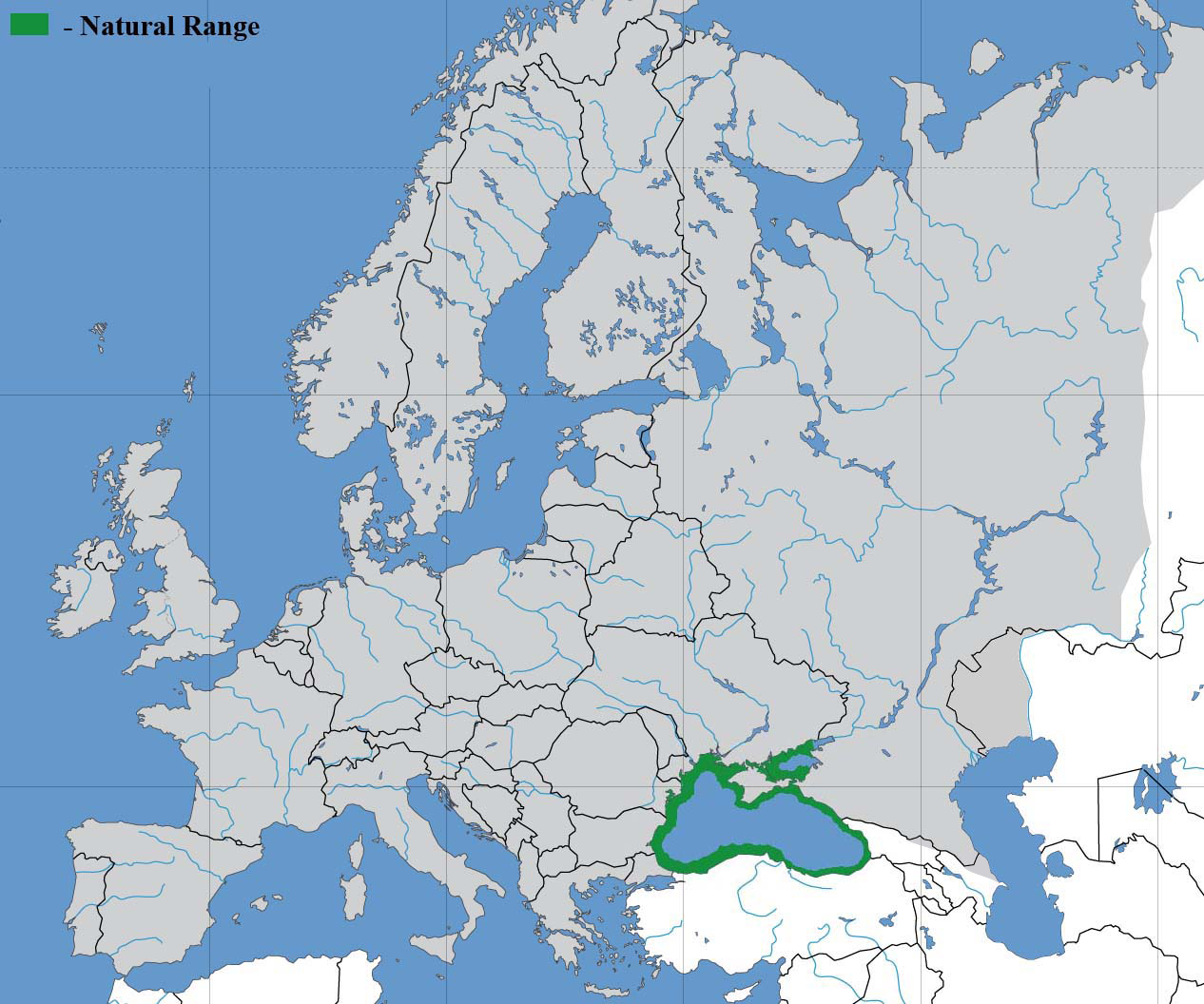
- The range of Proterorhinus marmoratus sensu stricto

Synonyms
- Gobius marmoratus nasalis pontica Smitt, 1899; Gobius marmoratus Pallas, 1814; Gobius quadricapillus Pallas, 1814; Gobius macropterus Nordmann, 1840; Gobius rubromaculatus Kriesch, 1873; Gobius blennioides Kessler, 1877

= Proterorhinus marmoratus =

Species of fish

Proterorhinus marmoratus is a species of gobiid fish, a tubenose goby native to the brackish water parts of the Black Sea and the Sea of Azov, near the coasts of Bulgaria, Georgia, Romania, Ukraine and Russia. Also it is found in the Marmora Sea (Turkey). It can reach a length of 11.5 centimetres (4.5 in) TL.

== Systematics ==
Proterorhinus marmoratus, known as the tubenose goby, was formerly considered as the only representative of the genus Proterorhinus with a native range extending to the Caspian Sea basin, and a recent invasive range in the freshwaters of Europe and North America. In the 2000s it was split into several cryptic species based on the molecular and further morphological analyses. In the current concept, P. marmoratus is applicable only to marine and brackish water populations of the Black Sea basin. Freshwater populations of this basin are now referable to the western tubenose goby (P. semilunaris), except for a local Crimean Proterorhinus tataricus.
