= Arhythmacanthidae =

Scientific classification
- Kingdom: Animalia
- Phylum: Acanthocephala
- Class: Palaeacanthocephala
- Order: Echinorhynchida
- Family: Arhythmacanthidae; Yamaguti, 1935

Synonyms
- Arhythmacanthinae Yamaguti, 1935; Neoacanthocephaloidinae Golvan, 1960; Paracanthocephaloidinae Golvan, 1969; Hypoechinorhynchidae Petrochenko, 1956; Yamagutisentinae Golvan, 1969

Family of thorny-headed worms

Arhythmacanthidae is a family of parasitic worms from the order Echinorhynchida.

== Species ==
There are 9 genera in the family Arhythmacanthidae which contains the following species: (Note: A binomial authority in parentheses indicates that the species was originally described in a genus other than the present genus.)

=== Acanthocephaloides ===
Acanthocephaloides Meyer, 1932 contains 13 known species:

- Acanthocephaloides claviformis Araki & Machida, 1987

Found off Japan. The proboscis has 14 rows each of 6 hooks and 2 spines and the trunk has an anterior swelling. The apical hooks are the smallest; posterior hook largest, reaching up to 74 um. Hook and spine roots (when present) invariably simple, posteriorly directed, without manubria. Trunk spines are markedly smaller, with a variable distribution of trunk spines only on the anterior side.

- Acanthocephaloides cyrusi Bray, Spencer-Jones & Lewis, 1988

A. cyrusi has been found parasitizing the fish: Blackhand sole (Pegusa nasuta referred to by its synonym Solea bleekeri) and the Small-spotted grunter (Pomadasys commersonnii) in Lake St. Lucia, Natal, South Africa. It is distinguished from the other species in the genus Arhythmacanthidae by the more greater sexual dimorphism in length, differing arrangement of hooks, the proboscis with the longest hooks at the anterior-most part and the larger size of proboscis hooks and body spines. Specifically, the proboscis hook rows with 3 spines and 3 hooks that increase in size anteriorly. Apical hook reaches 83–101 or 118–137 um in length and has root with large, oblique, anterior manubrium. Posterior spines rootless. Whole trunk with regular transverse rows of uniform, acuminate, 13–22 um long spines.

- Acanthocephaloides delamuri (Parukhin, 1989) Amin, 2013
- Acanthocephaloides distinctus Golvan, 1969

Found off Senegal.

- Acanthocephaloides geneticus (Buron, Renaud & Euzet, 1985)

Found off the Mediterranean coast of France.

- Acanthocephaloides ichiharai Araki & Machida, 1987

Found off Japan. The proboscis has variable 13–14 (rarely 12 or 16) hook rows of 10–12 hooks/spines (9 hooks and 3 rootless spines in 1 specimen). Hook and spine roots (when present) invariably simple, posteriorly directed, without manubria with the apical hook being the smallest; posterior hook largest, and reaching up to 74 um. The trunk is cylindrical and has spines only on the anterior portion smaller than proboscis hooks and variable in their distribution.

- Acanthocephaloides irregularis Amin, Oğuz, Heckman, Tepe & Kvach, 2011

A. irregularis is found parasitizing the Combtooth blenny (Parablennius zvonimiri) in the Gulf of Odesa, Ukraine, the Mushroom goby (Ponticola eurycephalus) in the Sukhyi Estuary, in the Black Sea, and the Tubenose goby (Proterorhinus marmoratus) and Black-striped pipefish (Syngnathus abaster) in both locations. The species is named for its irregular distribution of trunk spines. A. irregularis is most similar to its closest relative, A. propinquus in proboscis shape and armature as both have 12 longitudinal rows of 5 hooks each and the shape of the trunk, reproductive system and lemnisci. A. irregularis differs from A. propinquus in having randomly distributed trunk spines that are organised in circular rings of individual spines separated by aspinose zones. A. irregularis is also unique in having an anterior trunk collar, a very large triangular cephalic ganglion, nucleated pouches at the posterior end of the proboscis receptacle, and hooks and spines with roots bearing anterior manubria. It is the tenth species of the genus to be described.

- Acanthocephaloides neobythitis (Yamaguti, 1939) Amin, 2013

Found off Japan.

- Acanthocephaloides nicoli (Kumar, 1992) Amin, 2013
- Acanthocephaloides plagiusae Santana-Pineros, Cruz-Quintana, Centeno-Chale & Vidal-Martinez, 2013
- Acanthocephaloides propinquus (Dujardin, 1845)

A. propinquus was found parasitizing Uranoscopus scaber, Gobius niger, Gobius cobitis, Merluccius merluccius, Scorpaena scrofa, Eutrigla gurnardus, and Solea solea in the bay of Gemlik, Turkey. It is also found in the Atlantic Ocean, Mediterranean Sea and Black Sea. The body is between 2600 and 6237 μm long and between 140 and 280 μm wide. The eggs were between 30 and 64 μm long and 10 to 16 μm wide.

- Acanthocephaloides rhinoplagusiae (Yamaguti, 1935) Amin, 2013

Found off Japan.

- Acanthocephaloides spinicaudatus (Cable & Quick, 1954) Pichelin & Cribb, 1999

Found off Puerto Rico.

=== Bolborhynchoides ===
Bolborhynchoides Achmerov and Dombrovskaja-Achmerova, 1959 contains one species.

- Bolborhynchoides exiguus (Achmerow & Dombrowskaja-Achmerova, 1941)

=== Breizacanthus ===
Breizacanthus Golvan, 1969 contains five known species:

- Breizacanthus aznari Hernández-Orts, Alama-Bermejo, Crespo, García, Raga & Montero, 2012
- Breizacanthus chabaudi Golvan, 1969

Infests the Striped red mullet (Mullus surmuletus).

- Breizacanthus golvani Gaevskaja & Shukhgalter, 1984
- Breizacanthus irenae Golvan, 1969
- Breizacanthus ligur Paggi, Orecchia & Della Setta, 1975

=== Euzetacanthus ===
Euzetacanthus Golvan and Houin, 1964 contains three species:

- Euzetacanthus chorinemusi Gupta & Naqvi, 1984
- Euzetacanthus golvani Gupta & Fatma, 1985
- Euzetacanthus simplex (Rudolphi, 1810)

=== Heterosentis ===
Heterosentis Van Cleave, 1931 contains 15 known species:

- Heterosentis brasiliensis Vieira, Felizardo & Luque, 2009
- Heterosentis caballeroi (Gupta & Fatma, 1983) Bhattacharya, 2007
- Heterosentis fusiformis (Yamaguti, 1935) Tripathi, 1959
- Heterosentis heteracanthus (Linstow, 1896) Van Cleave, 1931

H. heteracanthus was found parasitizing Patagonotothen longipes, Patagonotothen tessellata and Champsocephalus esox in the eastern mouth of the Beagle Channel.

- Heterosentis hirsutus Pichelin & Cribb, 1999
- Heterosentis holospinus Amin, Heckman & Ha, 2011

H. holospinus has been found parasitizing the Striped eel catfish (Plotosus lineatus), in Halong Bay, Vietnam.

- Heterosentis martini Lanfranchi & Timi, 2011
- Heterosentis mongcai Amin, Heckmann & Ha, 2014
- Heterosentis mysturi Wei, Huang, Chen and Jiang, 2002
- Heterosentis overstreeti (Schmidt & Paperna, 1978) Amin, 1985
- Heterosentis paraplagusiarum (Nickol, 1972) Amin, 1985
- Heterosentis plotosi (Yamaguti, 1935) Schmidt & Paperna, 1978
- Heterosentis septacanthus (Sita in Golvan, 1969) Amin, 1985
- Heterosentis thapari (Gupta & Fatma, 1979) Amin, 1985
- Heterosentis zdzitowieckii (Kumar, 1992) Pichelin & Cribb, 1999

=== Hypoechinorhynchus ===
Hypoechinorhynchus Yamaguti, 1939 has five known species:

- Hypoechinorhynchus alaeopis Yamaguti, 1939
- Hypoechinorhynchus golvani Gutpa & Kumar, 1987
- Hypoechinorhynchus magellanicus Szidat, 1950

H. magellanicus was found parasitizing Champsocephalus esox in the eastern mouth of the Beagle Channel.

- Hypoechinorhynchus robustus Pichelin, 1999
- Hypoechinorhynchus thermaceri Buron, 1988

=== Paracanthocephaloides ===
Worms in this Paracanthocephaloides Golvan, 1969 have no trunk spines. There are four known species:

- Paracanthocephaloides caballeroi (Gupta & Fatma, 1983) Bhattacharya, 2007
- Paracanthocephaloides chabanaudi (Dollfus, 1951)
- Paracanthocephaloides incrassatus (Molin, 1858) Meyer, 1932
- Paracanthocephaloides tripathii Golvan, 1969

=== Solearhynchus ===
The proboscis hooks in Solearhynchus de Buron and Maillard, 1985 gradually decrease in size posteriorly. There are only two known species

- Solearhynchus kostylewi (Meyer, 1932)

S. kostylewi was found parasitizing Solea solea in the bay of Gemlik, Turkey. The body was between 7404 and 7854 μm long and 739 and 1040 μm wide. The anterior part of the body was wider than the posterior. The proboscis was cylindrical and armed with 16 rows of hooks each with 5 or 6 hooks the longest hooks being in the middle of the proboscis. The smallest basal spinelike hooks were unrooted. The testes were located centrally in the body distant from the six cement glands. The eggs measured between 42 – 64μm long and between 12 and 20μm wide.

- Solearhynchus soleae (Porta, 1905) (Note: Solearhynchus soleae, was originally described as Echinorhynchus soleae by Porta in 1905 and re-described by Meyer in 1933 as Acanthocephaloides soleae. De Buron and Maillard later (1985) placed it in the genus Solearhynchus.)

S. soleae was found parasitizing Solea solea in the bay of Gemlik, Turkey. The body was from 5382 to 20328 μm long and 693 to 1200 μm wide. The proboscis was from 224 – 320 μm long and the proboscis sac was between 277 and 480 μm long. The proboscis has 12 – 14 rows of hooks each comprising 5 or 6 hooks. The longest hooks were in the middle of the proboscis and the smallest basal hooks were unrooted and resembled spines. The lemnisci were longer than the proboscis sac, measuring between 312 and 350 μm and between 312 – 349 μm long. Males had two testes in the posterior part of the body distant from six piriform cement glands. The eggs measured between 56 and 68 μm long and between 12 and 20 μm wide. This species was also recorded in the Black Sea by Belofastova and Korniychuk (as the synonym Acanthocephaloides rhytidotes). The species name soleae derives from the genus name of the host, the Adriatic sole (Originannly named Solea impar, now named Pegusa impar).

=== Spiracanthus ===
Spiracanthus Muñoz and George-Nascimento, 2002 has one species

- Spiracanthus bovichthys Munoz & George-Nascimento, 2002

=== Yamagutirhynchus ===
Yamagutirhynchus has two species:

- Yamagutirhynchus elliotae Smales 2022
- Yamagutirhynchus lymberyi Smales 2022

== Hosts ==
Arhythmacanthidae species parasitize fish.

Hosts for Arhythmacanthidae species

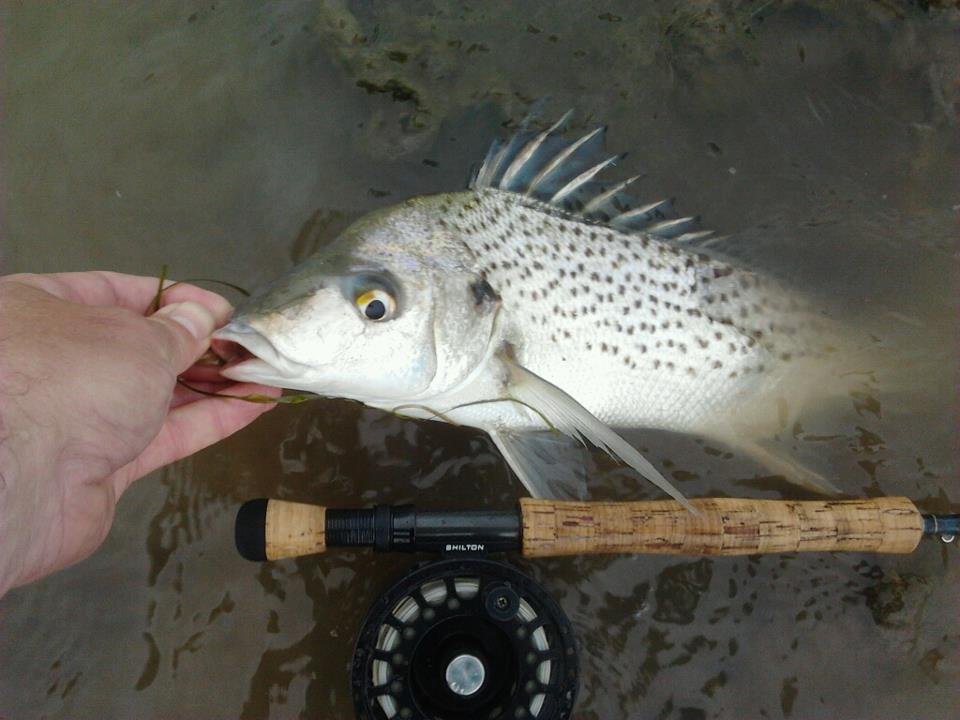
The Small-spotted grunter is a host of Acanthocephaloides claviformis.

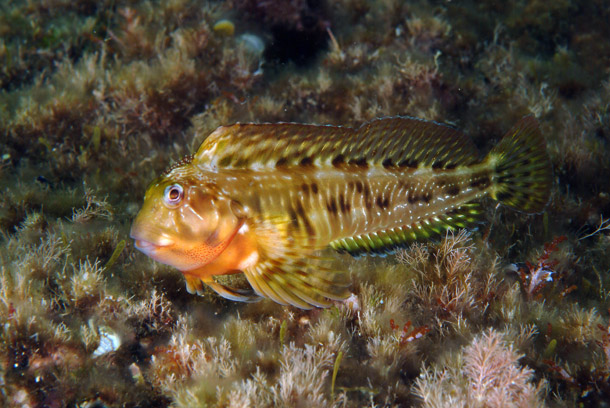
The Combtooth blenny is one of the hosts of Acanthocephaloides irregularis.

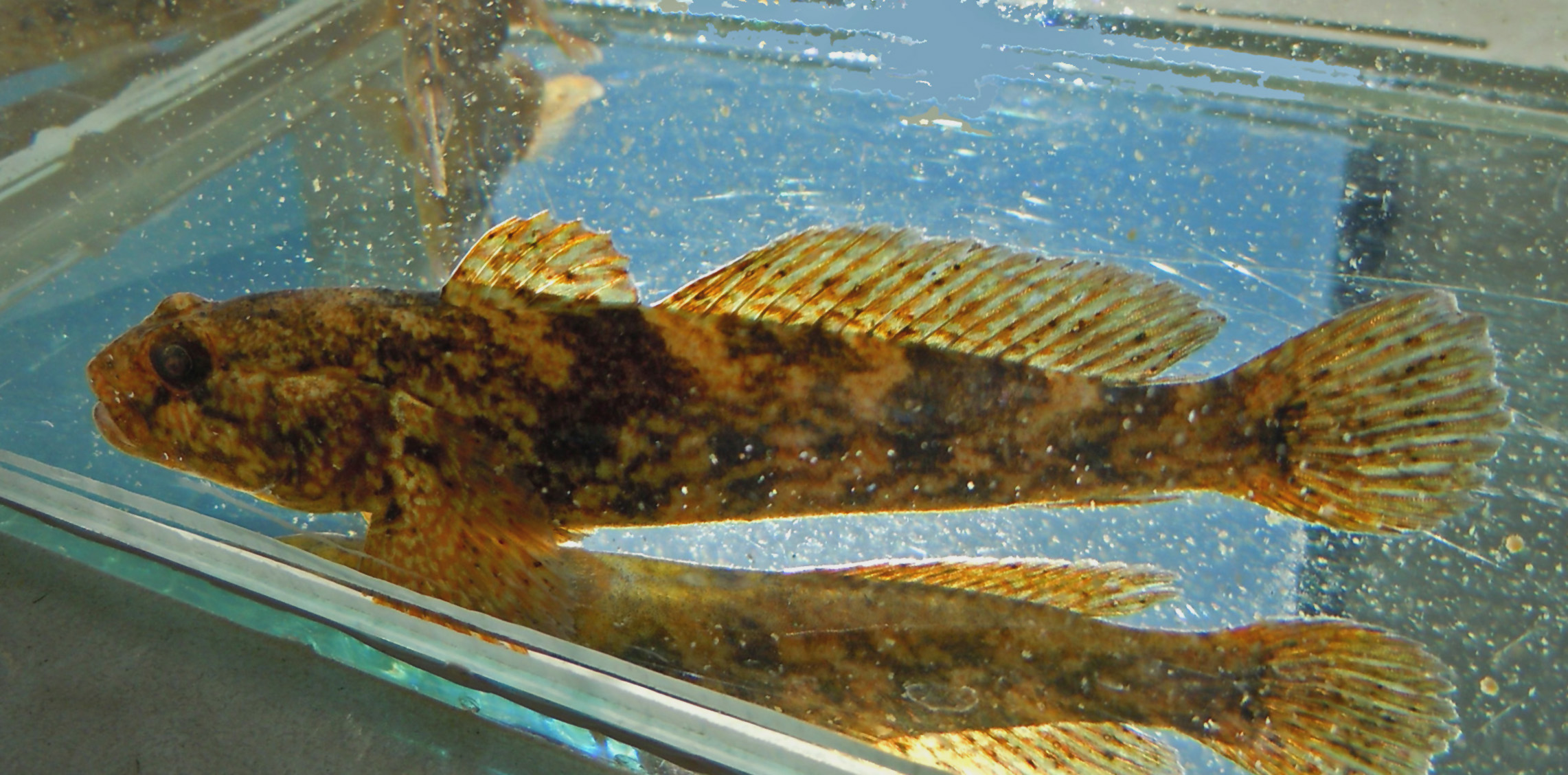
The Mushroom goby is one of the hosts of Acanthocephaloides irregularis.

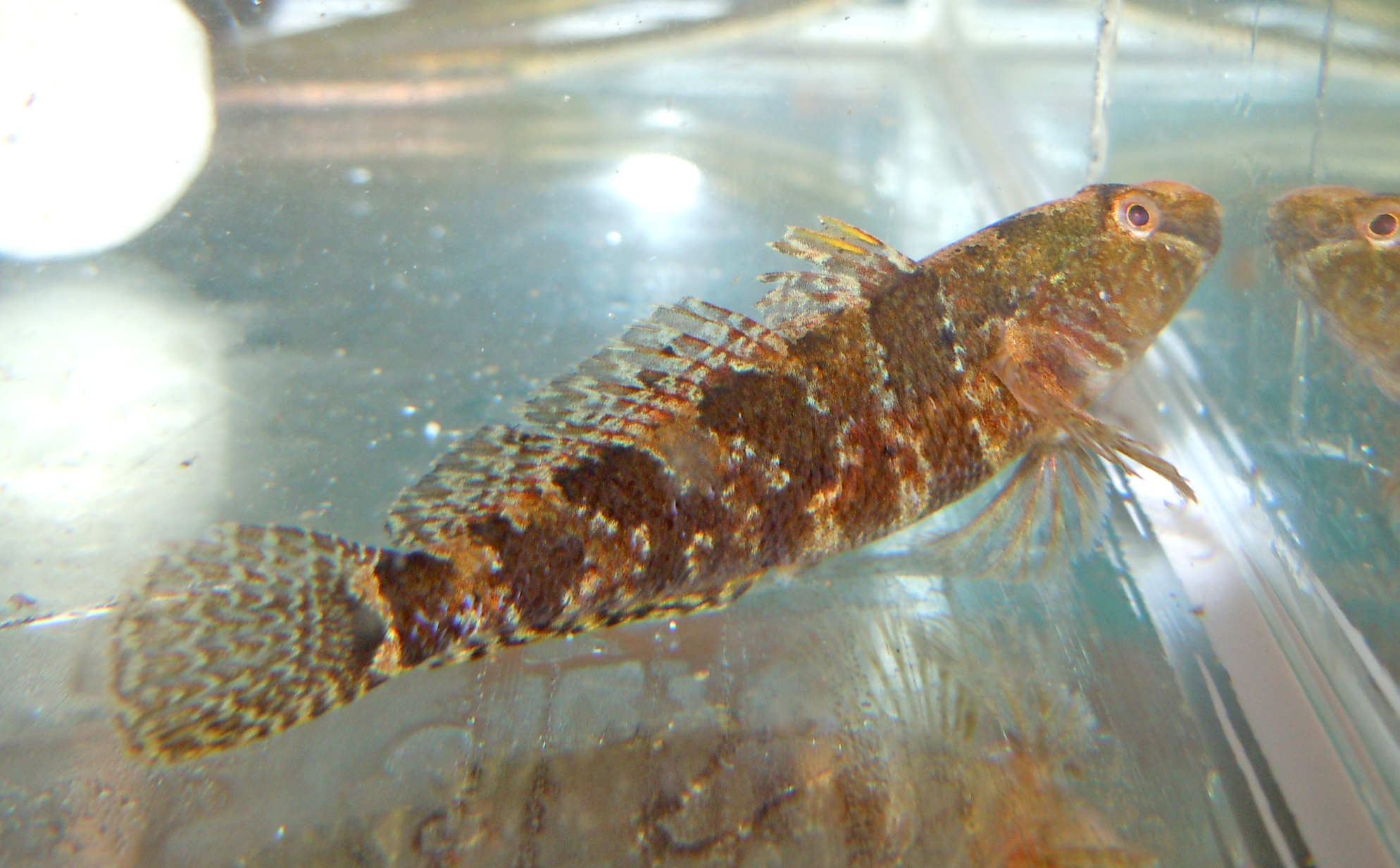
The Tubenose goby is one of the hosts of Acanthocephaloides irregularis.

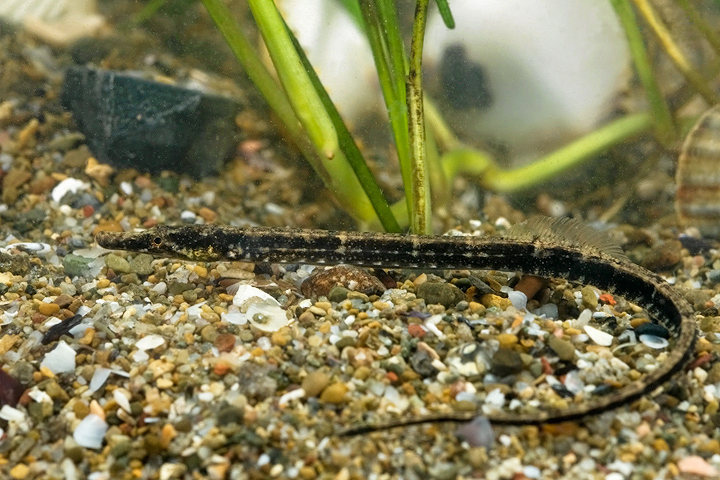
The Black-striped pipefish is one of the hosts of Acanthocephaloides irregularis.

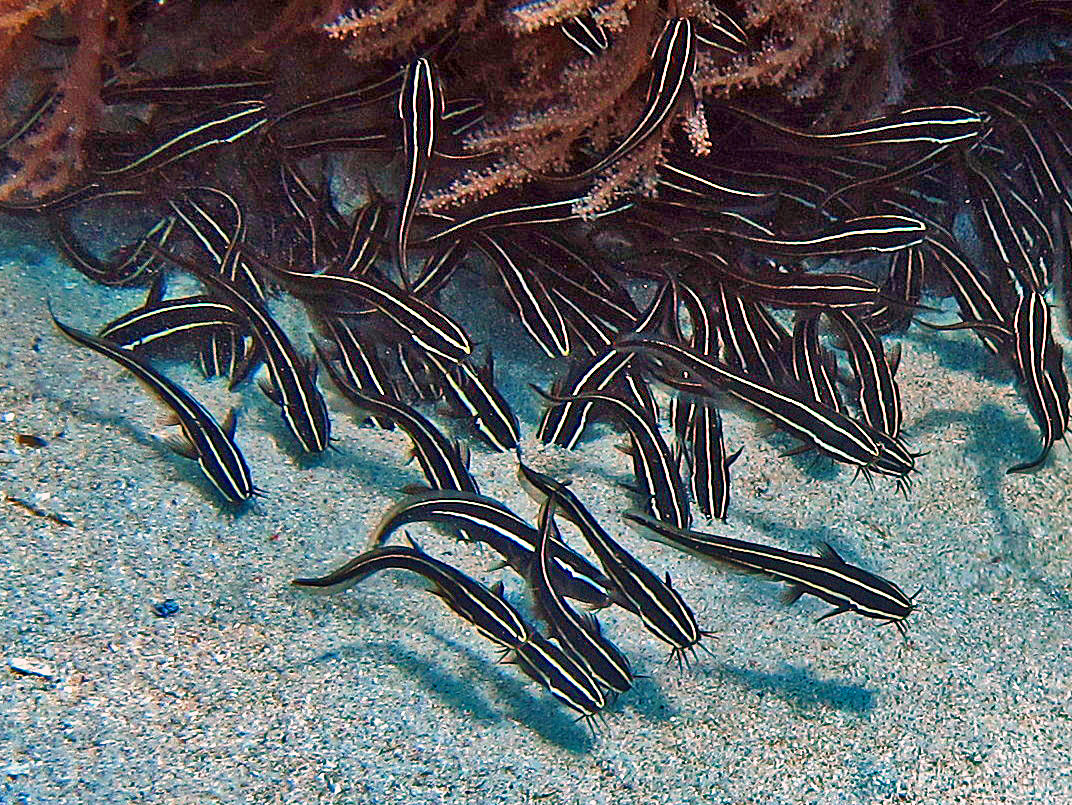
Heterosentis holospinus parasitizes the Striped eel catfish.
