= List of stratigraphic units and structural features in Massachusetts =

This list includes stratigraphic units and structural geologic features in Eastern Massachusetts, grouped by age.

== Stratigraphic Units ==
=== Eastern Massachusetts ===
Proterozoic

- Mattapan Volcanic Complex
- Lynn Volcanic Complex
- Middlesex Fells Volcanic Complex

Cambrian

- Weymouth Formation
- Greenlodge Formation
- Braintree Argillite

Silurian-Devonian

- Newbury Volcanic Complex

Pennsylvanian (Late Carboniferous)

- Bellingham Conglomerate
- Narragansett Bay Group

== Structural Geologic Features ==
=== Eastern Massachusetts ===
Basins, Zones, Troughs & Blocks

- Bellingham Basin
- Boston Basin
- Burlington mylonite zone
- Middleton Basin
- Nantucket Basin
- Narragansett Basin
- Nashoba Zone
- Nashua trough
- Newbury Volcanic Zone
- Norfolk Basin

Faults

- Bloody Bluff fault
- Clinton-Newbury fault
