= South Fiji Basin =

Oceanic basin in the south-west Pacific Ocean between Fiji and New Zealand

- Stratigraphic range: 33–15 Ma
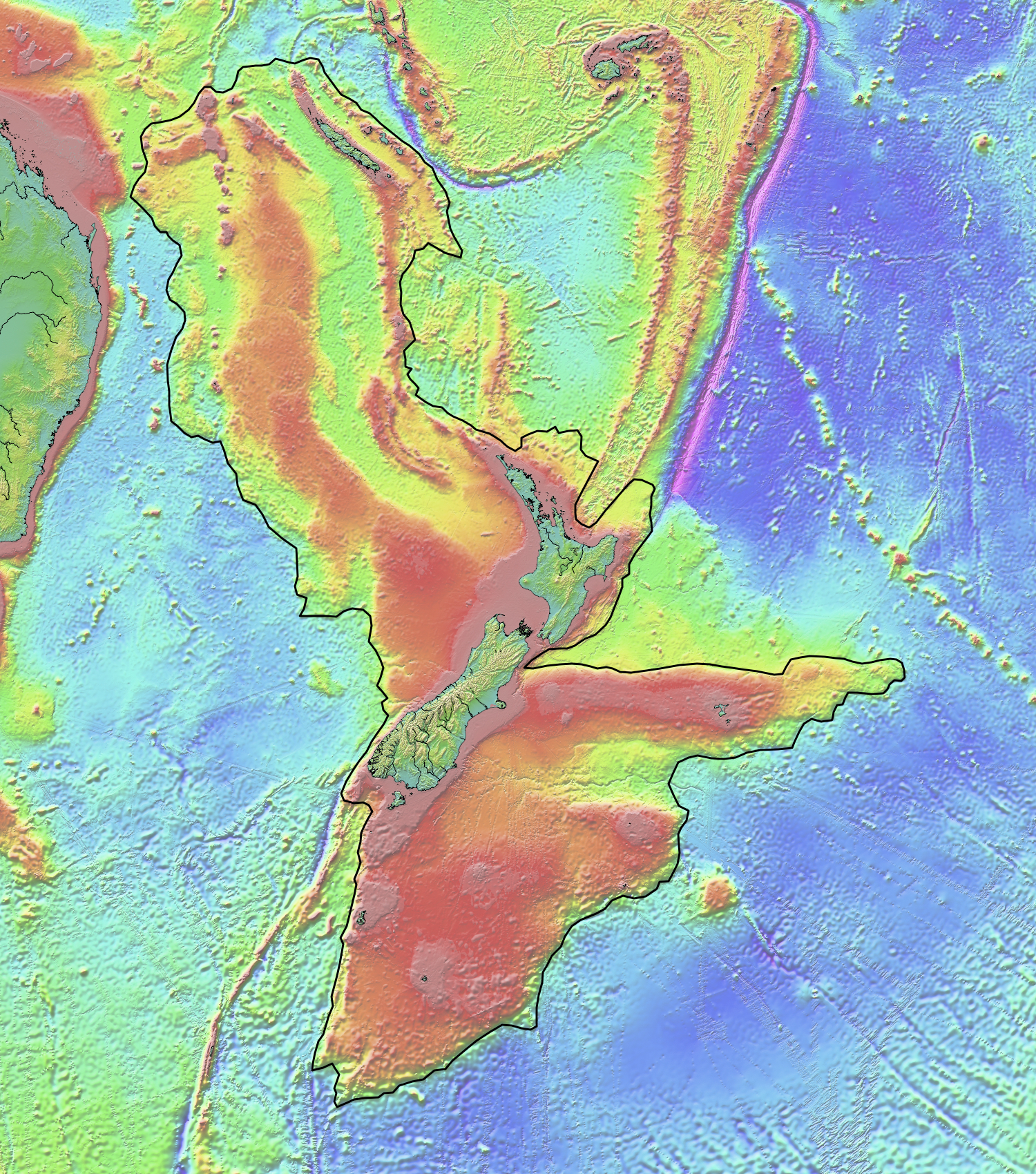
- . The South Fiji Basin is surrounded to the north and east by more geologically active Pacific Ocean seafloor features. The Zealandia continental margin is shown in black.
- Type: Igneous
- Area: 800,000 km^{2} (310,000 sq mi)

Lithology
- Primary: mafic basalts
- Other: Sediments including ashy biogenic sediments

Location
- Coordinates: 26.0°S 176.0°W
- Region: South Pacific
- Country: Fiji

Type section
- Named for: Fiji

The South Fiji Basin (also Fiji Basin) is a large 4 to 4.7 km (2.5 to 2.9 mi) deep oceanic basin in the south-west Pacific Ocean, south of Fiji. It was formed from the then Indo-Australian plate and is delimited to the north west by the New Hebrides Trench, and the Hunter fracture zone, to the west by the Three Kings Ridge, to the east by the Lau-Colville Ridge, and to the south by the continental shelf of Zealandia.

== Geology ==
Over the basement volcanics is deposited up to 500 m (1,600 ft) of sediment. The thicker sediments of the Kupe Abyssal Plain nearer New Zealand and land commenced to accumulate from the end of the Oligocene onwards and terminated in the Pliocene with likely minor contributions from southern Lau-Colville Ridge volcanoes. The oldest basalt dredged from the Minerva Abyssal Plain is 26.0 ± 1.0 Ma but it is unknown if this is of basement or later volcanic origin. However drill site 285 in the Minerva Abyssal Plain also has basement volcanics that are dated to 26 Ma. The oldest other drill basement may be 31 Ma, but this has been questioned without the sample being re-examined. Basalts from the South Fiji Basin are little influenced by subduction, although they can have slight enrichment from a slab component, but come from variably enriched mantle, resulting from mixing between enriched mantle, like FOZO and depleted mantle, like depleted MORB mantle (DMM).

To the north is the Minerva Abyssal Plain which has north west limits of the New Hebrides Trench and the Hunter fracture zone. Within this abyssal plain are several seamounts including to the north of the Cook fracture zone, Alison Seamount and Coquille Seamount beyond the end of the Three Kings Ridge. Beyond the Fantail Terrace to the north east of the Three Kings Ridge are a number of seamounts that separate the Minerva Abyssal Plain from the southern Kupe Abyssal Plain, in a Central Ridge structure with little overlying sediment. These include Julia, Marion, Matahourua and Mascarin seamounts. To the north east the Minerva Abyssal Plain is bounded by the Lau Terrace rather than the Lau Ridge to the east of the terrace. The Kupe Abyssal Plain is delimited to its west by the Three Kings Ridge and this western portion contains multiple seamounts including the Sarah group, Margot and Devonport group of seamounts. These tend to give younger dates and there is increasing evidence that the Kupe Abyssal Plain is Miocene in age. The seafloor magnetic anomalies of the southern Kupe Abyssal Plain, unlike those further north, have been resolved and indicate NW–SE spreading.

=== Seamount Geology ===
Basalt from Julia Seamount was dated at 22.1±1.8 Ma and Alison at 19.3±1.5 Ma. Matahourua, Mascarin, Marion, Coquille and one Margot seamount dedged sample are ocean island basalts. Marion trachybasalt was dated at 16.2 ± 0.2 Ma and Matahourua basalt at 15 ± 2 Ma. These younger ages must be after spreading had ceased. The Devonport East and Central, Sarah North, Central and West, and one sample from Margot, are trachybasalts or trachyandesite consistent with back arc volcanism and are aged from 19.9 to 21 million years ago.

=== Seismology ===
The basin itself is inactive. However its eastern portions in the present Australian plate are over the deeply subducted Pacific plate slab, so many deep ( more than 400 km (250 mi)) and large (more than M_{w} 6) earthquakes have occurred in historic times. Other earthquake activity is confined to the northwestern margins of the basin.

== Tectonics ==
The South Fiji Basin started forming in the Oligocene. The historic interpretation based on magnetic anomaly patterns was that spreading involved a triple junction in the Minerva Abyssal Plain. There has been some disagreement if the Kupe Plain Abyssal spreading was in a westward or eastward trend. This means that a full tectonic model consensus can not be reached. However the current best fit model is one of west-dipping Tonga–Kermadec–Hikurangi subduction zone rolling back clockwise, and an approximately east-dipping New Caledonia–Northland subduction zone that rolls back anticlockwise until about 21 million years ago. A maximum half spreading rate of about 5 cm/year (2.0 in/year) has been calculated. The Minerva spreading centres persisted into the Miocene and with the 23 Ma age of a basalt from the Cook fracture zone and other samples, have been interpreted to indicate the spreading centres have been active to this date. The northern Norfolk Basin has also been adjacent to this activity in the Cook fracture zone. The New Hebrides Trench has consumed a large area of crust of the South Fiji Basin since the Late Miocene. It is possible that Pacific plate subduction was followed by Early to Middle Miocene back-arc spreading in the southern South Fiji Basin with a pre-Miocene tectonic configuration that would have resembled the present Lau Basin and Havre Trough. The former Kupe microplate is now fixed to the Australian plate. Presently the north western South Fiji Basin is probably not being subducted under the New Hebrides plate at the New Hebrides Trench but rather the margin is a zone of transformation.

== Ecology ==
The basin seawater has a temperature of about 2 °C (36 °F) at 4 kilometres (2.5 mi) depth. Fish species known include those from the genus Pachycara (e.g. Pachycara moelleri), large Synaphobranchid, Halosaurs (Aldrovandia affinis), cusk-eels (Bassogigas spp.. Bassozetus spp., Barathrites iris), and members of the Zoarcidae family. High-energy macrourids are absent at the limited sites sampled. Amongst crustaceans, amphipods including members of the family Lysianassidae, prawns of the genus Benthesicymus (Benthesicymus crenatus, Benthesicymus howensis) and Aristeidae (Cerataspis monstrosus) are found.

== See also ==
- Geology of the Pacific Ocean
- North Fiji Basin
