= Geology of Massachusetts =

Geology of U.S. state

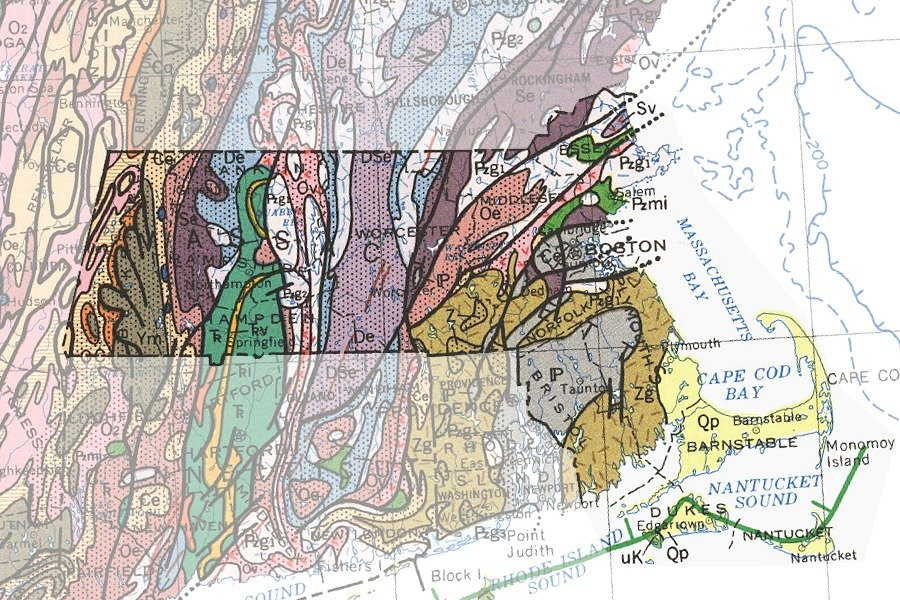
A geological map of the state, showing the north–south trend of the bedrock strata.

The geology of Massachusetts includes numerous units of volcanic, intrusive igneous, metamorphic and sedimentary rocks formed within the last 1.2 billion years. The oldest formations are gneiss rocks in the Berkshires, which were metamorphosed from older rocks during the Proterozoic Grenville orogeny as the proto-North American continent Laurentia collided against proto-South America. Throughout the Paleozoic, overlapping the rapid diversification of multi-cellular life, a series of six island arcs collided with the Laurentian continental margin. Also termed continental terranes, these sections of continental rock typically formed offshore or onshore of the proto-African continent Gondwana and in many cases had experienced volcanic events and faulting before joining the Laurentian continent. These sequential collisions metamorphosed new rocks from sediments, created uplands and faults and resulted in widespread volcanic activity. Simultaneously, the collisions raised the Appalachian Mountains to the height of the current day Himalayas.

Warped and faulted basins formed in eastern Massachusetts and preserve coal from massive Paleozoic swamps as well as fossil plants and insects. The final phases of mountain building occurred as Laurentia completed its collision with Gondwana and Europe to form the supercontinent Pangea. Beginning around 200 million years ago, rifting broke apart Pangea. Erupting basalt lavas formed the new oceanic crust of the Atlantic Ocean, wedging apart Africa, Europe and North America along the approximate lines where the continents collided. The Connecticut River Valley and the Middleton Basin formed as failed rifts, filling with sediment that preserve dinosaur footprints. After the Jurassic, Massachusetts experienced long-running and continuous erosion with no more volcanic activity and only low-level seismic activity. The Appalachians shed sediments eastward, accumulating as the Atlantic coastal plain of southeastern Massachusetts.

A rapid cooling of the planet in the last 2.5 million years of the Quaternary resulted in one-mile thick ice sheets advancing southward and accelerating erosion. The Pleistocene glaciations rechanneled rivers and created large sediments deposits, including the terminal moraines of Cape Cod, Martha's Vineyard and Nantucket, as well as hundreds of smaller drumlins, eskers and kame deposits.

Today, universities in Massachusetts are hubs for worldwide geologic research while local professional and amateur geologists study landforms and geologic history, applying knowledge of regional geology to construction, environmental remediation, water resource management and quarrying.

== Geological History ==
=== Proterozoic (1.2 billion–539 million years ago) ===
The early history of Massachusetts can be traced to around 1.2 to 1.1 billion years ago in the Mesoproterozoic Era of the Precambrian with some of the oldest rocks in the state situated in the Berkshires. What is now the western edge of the state was at the time the continental margin of the proto-North American continent Laurentia. The Grenville orogeny significantly altered many rocks through metamorphism as Laurentia collided with the Rio de la Plata Craton and Amazonian Craton to form the supercontinent Rodinia. In fact, the Berkshires are dominated by gneiss that metamorphosed during the Grenville orogeny.

The Rodinian continent broke up around 750 million years ago and rocks of proto-Massachusetts may have bordered the current west coast of South America in the west of the short-lived Pannotia supercontinent.

Pannotia 545 Ma after Dalziel, view centered on the South Pole

Africa, South America, Australia, India and Antarctica formed the new continent Gondwana while Laurentia and Baltica drifted away as separate continents throughout the rest of the Proterozoic.

In the late Proterozoic, a series of small island arcs began to form offshore of Gondwana while continental crust developed as part of the Gondwanan continent, before splitting off as microcontinents and other small continental terranes. For example, the Nashoba terrane formed as a mid-ocean island arc and is now wedged between the Merrimack and Avalon terranes, bounded by the Clinton-Newbury fault in the west. It extends south to Chester, Connecticut and Long Island Sound.

Beginning 550 million years ago, the microcontinent Avalonia, broke off of Gondwana and approached the eastern shore of Laurentia. Proposed as similar in size to Japan, Avalonia (also referred to as the Avalonia terrane) currently forms the basement rock of Connecticut, Rhode Island, eastern Massachusetts, eastern Maine, eastern New Brunswick, Nova Scotia, part of Newfoundland, southern England and Ireland, Belgium, the Netherlands and northern Germany (the European portions were separated during the subsequent break-up of the supercontinent Pangea 200 million years ago).

The quartzite and shale of the Westboro Formation appears to be the oldest Avalonian rock in Massachusetts. During the period when it was a part of the Gondwanan crust, the formation of the highly deformed mylonite of the Burlington mylonite zone began prior to 625 million years ago. Between 620 and 610 million years ago (rocks of these ages are southwest and north of Boston respectively) the Dedham granite intruded, contributing foliation in the Burlington mylonite and thin layers of feldspar and recrystallized quartz, while the Westwood granite developed at shallow depth and intruded the Mattapan volcanic rocks. Milford granite, which was widely used in building construction such as for the Boston Public Library formed 610 million years ago and is very similar to the Dedham granite, but with more granular quartz and feldspar and some mylonization, which appears at the surface in the Nobscot mylonite zone in Southboro and Framingham. A section of the batholith that domes slightly in the area of Milford is interpreted as the Milford antiform. Light gray granites of the Fall River batholith intruded at the same time. The Boston Basin formed as a faulted rift basin in the Avalonian microcontinent and extends an additional 10 miles eastward into Massachusetts Bay. The west-dipping Northern Border thrust fault is marked by a rocky slope near Massachusetts Route 60 and forms the northern bound of the basin, while the Blue Hills and Ponkapoag faults mark the southern boundary.

Beginning 596 million years ago, a period of volcanic activity erupted the fine-grained rhyolite and ashflow tuff, breccia and mudflows of the Mattapan and Lynn volcanic rocks. The Brighton volcanic rocks erupted later, 589 million years ago, producing layered basalt and quartz diorite dikes that were subsequently buried by sediments and hydrothermally altered.

The 2000-foot-thick Roxbury formation (including its 1550-foot-thick Dorchester member) deposited during this late Proterozoic time, with conglomerate and slate or poorly sorted Squantum member sediments. Although there is a lack of glacially-derived pebbles, some geologists have interpreted bedded siltstones as evidence of glacial deposition during the Snowball Earth global ice age.

=== Paleozoic (539–251 million years ago) ===
==== Shelburne Falls and Bronson Hill island arcs ====
The Iapetus Ocean opened between Laurentia and Gondwana beginning around 550 million, overlapping the beginning of the current Phanerozoic Eon in which multi-cellular life rapidly diversified. A series of island arc and continent-continent collisions built up the Appalachian Mountains throughout the Paleozoic forging many of the rocks in Massachusetts. The first collision between 485 and 440 million years ago began with the arrival of the Shelburne Falls island arc and resulting in the Taconic orogeny mountain building event. According to James Skehan, author of Roadside Geology of Massachusetts and a leading geology researcher at Boston College, Berkshire rocks were thrusted "like an accordion." As a result, many gneiss units were buried between three and 10 miles below the surface. The list of older Grenville orogeny-related gneiss units includes the Washington gneiss (the most widespread), Tyringham gneiss, Stamford gneiss or the Hoosac, Rowe and Moretown schists, which formed from continental shelf sediments. In places, areas of ultramafic oceanic crust rocks were "scraped" to the surface by the collision and commonly contain talc and soapstone.

A combination of radiometric dating and a graptolite fossil preserved in Taconic rocks indicates that the orogeny occurred in the Ordovician. In many cases, deep water sediments from offshore of the Laurentian continental margin were uplifted and metamorphosed, becoming the Greylock schist, Everett schist and Hoosac formation. Some preexisting landward sediments were also metamorphosed to become the muscovite, schist, and quartzite of the Dalton Formation and the Cheshire Quartzite (this latter quartzite is formed from heavily altered beach sands). Nearshore carbonates also experienced metamorphism, as in the case of the Stockbridge Marble, formed from limestone or the overlying Walloomsac Formation.

The uplands of central Massachusetts preserve widespread tectonic divergence. As the Bronson Hill island arc became the second terrane to come ashore, nappes and thrust faults were pushed in varying directions. The Hardwick and Coys Hill granites both intruded at this period and ultramafic rocks found with the Coys Hill granite may preserve the ancient oceanic crust of the Iaptetus Ocean. At the core of the Bronson Hill belt is the Monson gneiss, rich in microcline, plagioclase, amphibole schist, and eye-shaped augen gneiss. Ultramafic oceanic crust is preserved as peridotite. Much of the terrain of central Massachusetts is formed by domes that were created in the Cambrian and Ordovician. In fact, the Ammonousuc and Partridge formation mafic and felsic volcanic rocks ring uplifted domes, dating to the Ordovician. The Clough quartzite is younger, from the Silurian.

The Acadian orogeny, from 425 to 270 million years ago was the most extensive and long lasting Appalachian orogeny, as the microcontinent Avalonia (also referred to as the Avalon terrane) collided followed by a full collision between Europe, Gondwana (western Africa) and North America to form the supercontinent Pangea.

The Pelham dome—a large upland structure running north–south east of Amherst—appears to contain 600-million-year-old Avalon terrane rocks. These rocks were likely the subducting edge of the Avalon terrane which were later uplifted west of other intervening terranes sometime in the Devonian.

After the Bronson Hill island arc, one of the next terranes to collide was the Merrimack terrane, which trends west to east in Ware, Gardner, and Southbridge, as well as encompassing the rocks of Mount Wachusett. A large number of Merrimack terrane rocks are west-dipping and date to the Silurian, including the Oakdale and Eliot formations or the Paxton schist. The Ware Belt is part of the larger terrane, characterized by west-dipping schists, the four-mile wide Hardwick pluton and the Coys Hill granite. Further north, the Gardner Belt is an anticline with significant Silurian sandstone while Paxton schist is typically associated with the Southbridge Belt. Mount Wachusett is part of the 15-mile Mount Wachusett Belt: A Devonian-age nappe on top of Paxton schist, which was intruded by the Fitchburg granite 402 million years ago.

==== Terrane collisions: Nashoba, Avalon and Meguma ====
Some fossil bearing sediments in Weymouth are 540 million year old, formed in the Cambrian and lie atop an eroded Avalonian granite surface. The discovery of Paradoxides harlani trilobite fossils in the Braintree slate also date to this period and help to confirm eastern Massachusetts' coastal Gondwana-Avalonia origins. In the southwest of the basin are coarse-grained sediments less than 599 million years old, but older than those in Weymouth atop eroded Precambrian Westwood granite and the Mattapan volcanic rocks. In eastern Massachusetts, other Cambrian-age rocks are found in the Nashoba Formation, which has alternating layers of biotite- and hornblende-gneiss, schist, quartzite and amphibolite. The source rock for the Nashoba Formation was likely a low-grade bauxite clay, highly enriched in aluminum, helping to produce large quantities of muscovite. In fact, these muscovite crystals are very large—often half an inch long—and could have derived from older sillimanite and andalusite.

The Fish Brook gneiss spans 40 miles between Georgetown and Hudson, displaying a generally pearl-white or gray rock rich in plagioclase, quartz and biotite. Initially igneous rock, it crystallized 500 million years ago and then metamorphosed during the Silurian 425 million years ago. It overlies the older Shawsheen gneiss and takes on a rusty, yellow appearance in the east. Other Nashoba terrane rocks of Paleozoic age include the Mississippian Indian Head Hill granite and diorite, the Sharpners Pond, Straw Hollow and Assabet diorites, pink Andover granite and Marlboro Formation amphibole schist and gneiss.

The large Bloody Bluff Fault (named for Bloody Bluff in Minute Man National Historical Park in Lexington) is a west-dipping brittle deformation zone that formed between the Avalon terrane and Nashoba terrane, likely in the late Paleozoic. During the Silurian, the Burlington mylonite zone finished forming due to intense shearing along the Nashoba-Avalon contact. The late Paleozoic was a period of intense volcanic activity in the Avalon terrane. For instance, the rhyolite Blue Hills quartz porphyry erupted from the Blue Hills volcanoes and the Quincy granite intruded Cambrian sediments. Quartz porphyry also formed in the Norfolk Basin, which took shape due to tectonic compression in the Alleghanian orogeny of the Pennsylvanian, although this rock is only exposed some places among a boulder-conglomerate. Further afield, in what is now Cape Ann, potassium and sodium-rich alkalic rift granites crystallized 450 million years ago, followed by the Peabody granite 370 million years ago. In both cases, the granites intruded darker gabbro plutons. The Franklin pluton further to the southwest closely resembles the Quincy granites in-terms of mineralogy and chemistry, but formed more recently, 417 million years ago in the Silurian from a rift between Milford granite and Fall River batholith. Tectonic activity produced the 1000 square mile Narragansett Basin around 315 million years ago. The basin contains coal, conglomerate, siltstone, sandstone and shale and has a large number of swampy low-lying forests at its present land surface. The much smaller Norfolk Basin formed from a syncline and exposes rhyolite rocks together with the Wamsutta basalt.

Because of its swamp-land conditions and thick sedimentary sequences, the Narragansett Basin is a regional hub for paleontology and paleobotany research. Over 300 species of plant fossils were found in the basin by the early 21st century, along with cockroaches, tube worms and primordial insects and spiders. Specific rock units in the Narragansett Basin include the Pennsylvanian Sachuest conglomerate, the coal-rich Rhode Island formation and the overlying Dighton conglomerate, while the Pondville conglomerate and Wamsutta red beds are the main rocks of the Norfolk Basin.

Also during the Acadian orogeny the Meguma terrane became the fourth and final continental landmass to amalgamate against the proto-Massachusetts coast. Dalhousie University researcher Paul Schenk recognized the Meguma terrane as continuous up the coast, adjacent to the Avalon terrane. It forms the rock of the Bay of Fundy and Nova Scotia continental shelf and underlies Cape Cod and Jamestown, Rhode Island. However, it is buried in Cape Cod beneath thick glacial sediments deposited within the last one million years. The Meguma terrane may have substantially subducted beneath the Avalon terrane with the point of contact marked by the Nauset fault in the middle of Cape Cod.

=== Mesozoic (251–66 million years ago) ===
Around 200 million years ago in the Triassic, Pangea began to break apart, forming rift valleys. During this period, the Connecticut River Valley began opening as a regional rift, but became a "failed rift" as rifting continued further to the east opening the proto-Atlantic Ocean. Large mafic basalt dikes and flows extruded in the valley, forming the east–west line of the Holyoke Range. The 80-mile-long Hartford Basin and the smaller Deerfield Basin which formed during this time period experience movement along the Connecticut Valley border fault, which bounds the eastern margin of both basins. Older crystalline Paleozoic-age strata was extensively faulted and buried below new lake bed sediments or uplifted, as in the case of Mount Warner in Hadley or arkose and sandstone which formed from the erosion of Berkshire schist in the west, together with the Pelham dome, Glastonbury dome and Belchertown pluton.

The lake-bed mudstones of the Shuttle Meadow formation preserved dinosaur footprints, as well as fossil fish and insects, which were first noticed in 1802 and became the basis of a large collection at Amherst College.

Rifting occurred elsewhere in Massachusetts, with the intrusion of the 300 foot wide Medford gabbro 190 million years ago in the Jurassic or flood basalts and basalt dikes in North Spencer, Holden and Tyngsboro. Although rifting was most pronounced in western Massachusetts, eastern portions of the state also experienced some activity. Examples of rifting include the 300 foot wide Medford dike and the faulting of the western margin of the Avalon terrane to form the Middleton Basin, both in the Jurassic. Triassic and Jurassic-age plant fossils are found in the arkose, conglomerate and shale of the Middleton Basin.

=== Cenozoic (66 million years ago–present) ===
During the Cenozoic, the current land mass of Massachusetts was entirely above water. As a result, very few rocks and fossils are preserved from much of the time period due to continual erosion through rivers and streams. Most land forms and deposits from the Cenozoic date to the last 2.5 million years of the Quaternary as successive ice sheets altered the land surface.

==== Quaternary (2.5 million years ago–present) ====
Around one million years ago, in the Pleistocene, rapid cooling of planet resulted in large, one-mile thick ice sheets advancing southward into New England, the Mid-Atlantic and much of central North America.

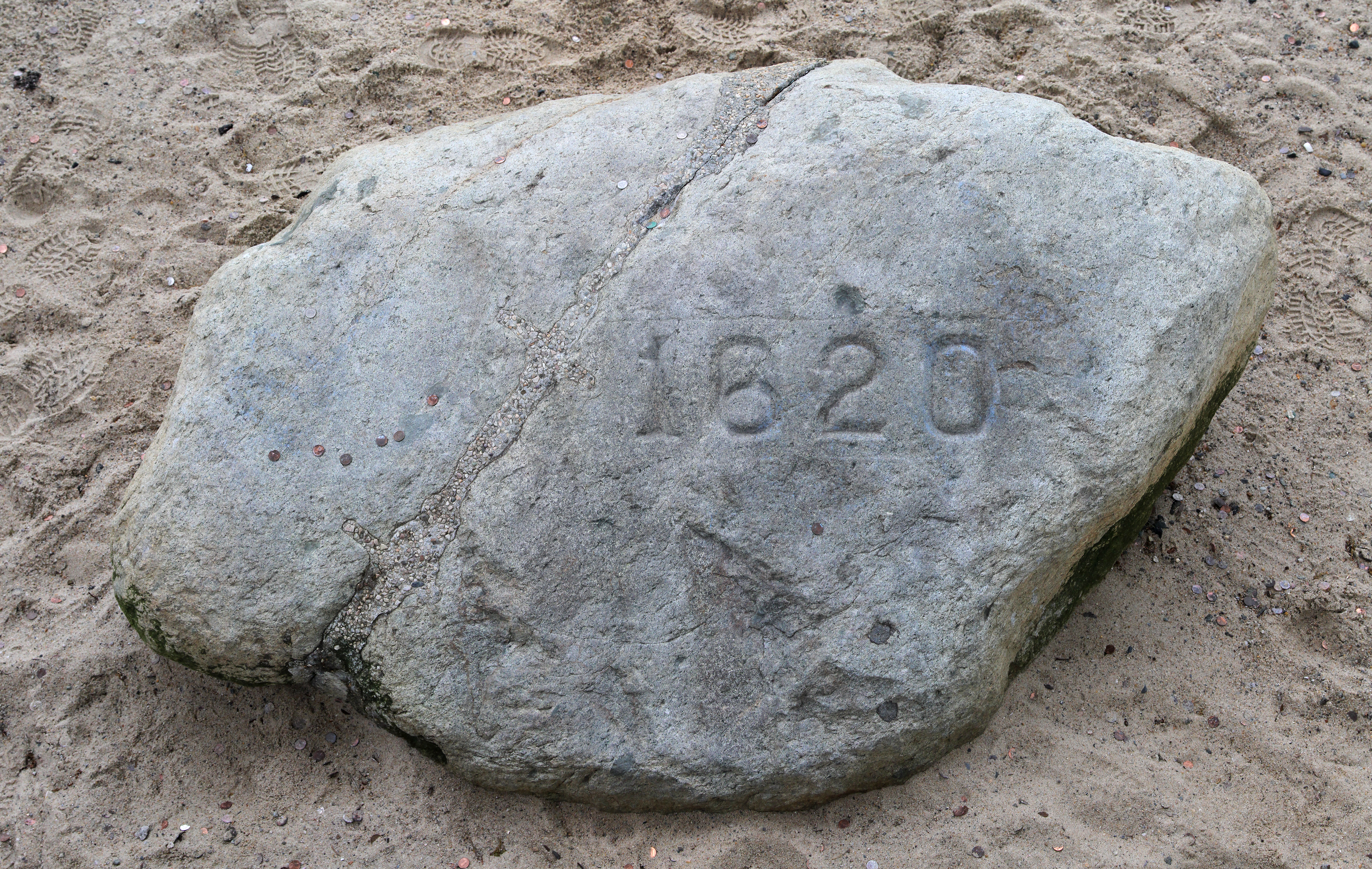
Plymouth Rock, a glacial erratic left behind at the end of the last glaciation period

During the Illinoian period, the Laurentide Ice Sheet covered the entire state in thousands of feet of ice. The Wisconsinan glaciation, thousands of years later, is the most recent glaciation. Mount Wachusett is estimated to have been covered with slightly more than 4000 feet of ice while Worcester was covered by ice that was 1500 to 2000 feet deep. By 23,000 to 22,000 years ago, was covered in ice. The ice was so thorough in its destruction of the region that the only thing left from the previous glaciation was Noman's Land, southwest of Martha's Vineyard.

The ice sheet also contained five glacial lobes which covered the state: the Hudson Valley lobe, the Connecticut Valley-Worcester Plateau lobe, the Narragansett Bay-Buzzards Bay lobe, the Cape Cod Bay lobe, and the South Channel lobe. Where each lobe met, dimples of sediment formed where the meltwater naturally flowed off the glaciers. Terminal moraines of sand and rock also formed at the end of these lobes. The lobes that bisected the state helped to form Long Island, Block Island, the Elizabeth Islands, Martha's Vineyard, Cape Cod, and Nantucket.

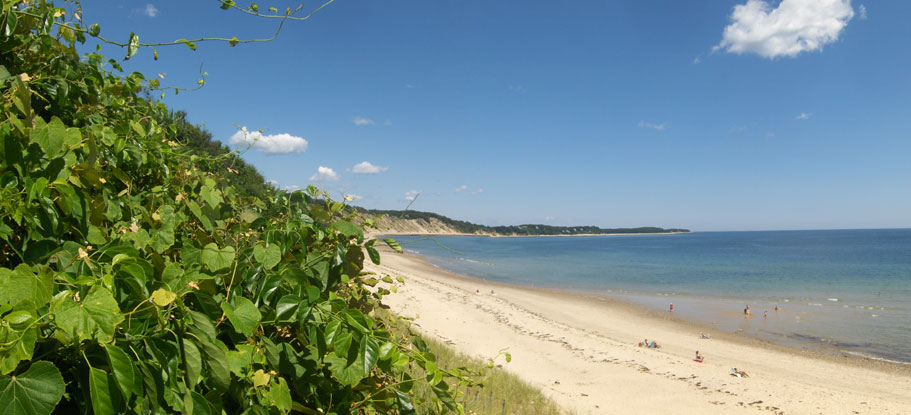
A view of the retreating cliffs along Cape Cod Bay, made up of deposits from the last glaciation

Around 21,000 years ago, the ice began to melt, retreating from Long Island between 21,000 and 19,500 years ago. Dating of postglacial materials on Martha's Vineyard indicates that ice melted from it earlier than 15,300 years ago. The Cape Cod Bay lobe was parked outside what is now Boston for over a thousand years, beginning 16,000 years ago and receding into southwest Maine by 14,500 years ago.

The melting ice released vast amounts of water, creating glacial lakes dotted across the state. The largest, Lake Hitchcock, stretched from Connecticut to Vermont and New Hampshire. As the weight of the ice diminished, the Earth's crust rebounded at a rate of 4.74 feet per mile, undercutting many of the glacial deposits, especially in the Connecticut River Valley. Moraine deposits can be seen on Cape Cod. Originally hills when the ice retreated, they have eroded and shifted over time to help produce the characteristic arm of the Cape.

== Structural geology ==
Massachusetts is composed largely of large terranes, but is also grouped into various belts and fault zones by structural geologists.

The divisions are:

- Taconic thrust sheet
- Vermont-Stockbridge marble belt
- Berkshire Massif, Hoosac thrust sheet and Rowe-Hawley belt
- Shelburne Falls Volcanic Belt
  - Connecticut River Valley rock intrusion
- Bronson Hill volcanic belt

Other major faults and features from west to east:

- Eastern Border Fault, an inactive Mesozoic rift, formed the Connecticut River Valley and runs along the eastern side of it. The fault can be traced from New Haven, CT to Keene, NH. Sporadic earthquakes along this fault lowered the valley and raised the eastern hills.
- Merrimack Terrane
  - Ware belt
  - Gardner belt
  - Wachusett Mountain belt
  - Southbridge belt
  - Nashua belt
  - Rockingham belt
    - Clinton-Newbury fault zone consists of many faults along a line that forms a 97-mile arc that trends from its northeast end near Newbury, Massachusetts on the Atlantic coast southwestward to Clinton and Worcester, and then south into Connecticut. Lake Quinsigamond between Worcester and Shrewsbury is a long, narrow lake that occupies a zone of bedrock weakness on the Clinton-Newbury fault zone. Bedrock south and east of the Clinton-Newbury fault zone is of the Nashoba terrane and consists of mafic, intermediate, and felsic volcanic, volcanogenic, and plutonic rocks.
- Nashoba Terrane
  - Bloody Bluff fault zone was named after Bloody Bluff in Minute Man National Historic Park in Lexington, Massachusetts and consists of reddish-orange Indian head granite that formed during the Mississippian period. The fault zone includes a number of faults clustered along an arc from its northeast end near Newbury near the Atlantic coast, curving about 80 miles southwest to Reading and Wilmington, and then into Connecticut.
- Avalon Terrane
  - Dedham granite
  - Boston Basin
  - Milford granite (part of the Rhode Island batholith)
  - Narragansett Basin
  - Fall River batholith
    - Nauset fault, or Cape Cod (Nauset) fault system, is the boundary between the Esmond-Dedham block of the Atlantica composite terrane and the Meguma terrane which underlies much of Nova Scotia.
- Meguma Terrane

== Surficial geology ==
Due to significant glacial and stream erosion throughout the recent geologic past, many parts of Massachusetts have shallow depth to bedrock of only a few feet, although some areas have sediment over 500 feet thick. Much of the soil and sediment in the state was deposited during the Pleistocene glaciations and takes the form of glacial till, moraine deposits, and glacial stratified deposits commonly found in valleys and low-lying areas. Swamps and flood plain alluvium typically emplaced more recently in the Holocene.

Bedrock tends to be unweathered, but thick saprolite deposits have formed in parts of the Housatonic River valley. Glacial till is preserved from two of the 15 phases of glaciation. Some till of possible Illinoian age is located on eastern Nantucket. In general, old till is found in the core of drumlins and often displays signs iron and manganese stained joints. Cape Cod, the Elizabeth Islands and northern Martha's Vineyard are ice collapse ridges on top of deeper, meltwater-sorted deposits. Because of a larger number of end-moraine deposits, eastern Massachusetts tends to have more boulders and rocks in the glacial till close to the surface.

Glacial stratified deposits formed in deltas, glacial rivers and lakes, often with well-sorted grains depending on the energy of the system. Ice dammed lakes like Lake Hitchock in the Connecticut River valley accumulated clay varve layers during each year of sedimentation. Because the glaciers melted after the emplacement of till, thick glacial outwash layers up to 50 feet thick are common in Connecticut River valley, Cape Cod and southeastern Massachusetts. The oldest post-glacial sediments include sand dunes and stream terraces in the western part of the state. Quaternary geologists, such as Joe Hartshorn (namesake of the Hartshorn Quaternary Laboratory at UMASS-Amherst) began the process of mapping surficial geology in Massachusetts in the 1960s with the final mapping of all quadrants finished by 2018. Overlapping this effort, the US Department of Agricultural conducted a series of soil surveys in the 1960s and 1970s.

In addition to naturally occurring deposits, Quaternary geologists have also mapped "artificial till" including fill for roads, railroads and dams as well as cranberry bog deposits with coarse sand filled in over swampland.

== Natural resource geology ==
Although mining has never been commonplace in Massachusetts, the state does have significant "nonfuel minerals" production of clay, sand, gravel and crushed stone to meet the demand of the regional construction industry. In the mid-19th century, iron ore deposits were found and considered to be worth mining. In 2004, the National Mining Association reported that the mining and quarrying industry generated $210 million, employing 1700 people directly and 11,700 indirectly.

During the 1970s and 1980s energy crises, Shell Oil Company, Exxon and other firms briefly conducted exploratory drilling for oil in the Atlantic, 200 miles off of Cape Cod. On land, Texaco briefly funded geophysical surveys in the 1970s in the Connecticut River valley. Black shale units in the Hartford Basin tend to be extremely thin and research is inconclusive to indicate whether these rocks contain hydrocarbons.

The Narragansett Basin in southeastern Massachusetts, beneath towns such as Mansfield, contains anthracite and meta-anthracite coal deposits.

== Geology research ==
With a large number of colleges and universities, Massachusetts has multiple academic geology departments, including the UMASS-Amherst Department of Geosciences, Bridgewater State University Department of Geological Sciences, Boston University Earth & Environment and programs at Harvard University, MIT, UMASS-Lowell, UMASS-Dartmouth and other institutions. Boston College maintains the Weston Observatory which hosts seismic instruments for the New England Seismic Network and a paleobotany laboratory.

Massachusetts hosts a number of coastal, marine and oceanographic research centers and departments, including Woods Hole Oceanographic Institution or Northeastern University Marine and Environmental Sciences. The Massachusetts Geological Survey, based out of the UMASS-Amherst Department of Geosciences is charged with geological mapping of the state, in coordination with the US Geological Survey (USGS). The USGS maintains a presence at Woods Hole Oceanographic Institution and runs the New England Water Science Center in Northborough, Massachusetts, which assesses water quality, conducts flood zone surveying, monitors pollutants in the Cape Cod aquifer and conducts other hydrological research.

College and university geoscience students in Massachusetts participate in the annual New England Intercollegiate Geological Conference (NEIGC), typically held over the Columbus Day weekend in October. NEIGC was first launched in 1901 with a field trip led by William Morris Davis to the terraces of the Westfield River.

The Massachusetts Geological Society was founded in 2015 as an organization for geology enthusiasts and professionals in the state, although it remains in its startup phase.

== See also ==
- List of stratigraphic units and structural features in Massachusetts
- Newark Supergroup
