= Assfish =

Assfish may refer to:

- Bony-eared assfish, Acanthonus armatus
- Cavernous assfish, Porogadus gracilis, in the genus Porogadus
- Various species in the genus Bassozetus
  - Robust assfish, Bassozetus robustus
