= Norfolk Basin =

- Norfolk Basin (Massachusetts) for the geological basin in North America
- Norfolk Basin (Oceania) for the geological basin in the South West Pacific region
