= Middleton Basin =

Geolpgic feature

The Middleton Basin is a small sedimentary basin, in northeastern Massachusetts, containing Late Triassic and Early Jurassic red beds. Estimated to be 5.7 kilometers long and at most half a kilometer wide, it is one of the smallest basins in the state and is closely associated with the Newbury basins.

A normal fault, striking northeast, is exposed on the southeastern margin of the basin, which separates it from surrounding Proterozoic crystalline basement rock. The red beds dip west. The basin is situated at a point where the Burlington mylonite zone and the Bloody Bluff fault fade out and where the Milford-Dedham zone veers north. Mylonite never formed in the area because the young Triassic faults did not produce long-lasting deformation.
