= Sphaerodiscus =

Sphaerodiscus may refer to:

- Sphaerodiscus, a genus of echinoderms in the family Goniasteridae, synonym of Sphaeriodiscus
- Sphaerodiscus, a genus of plants in the family Celastraceae, synonym of Euonymus
