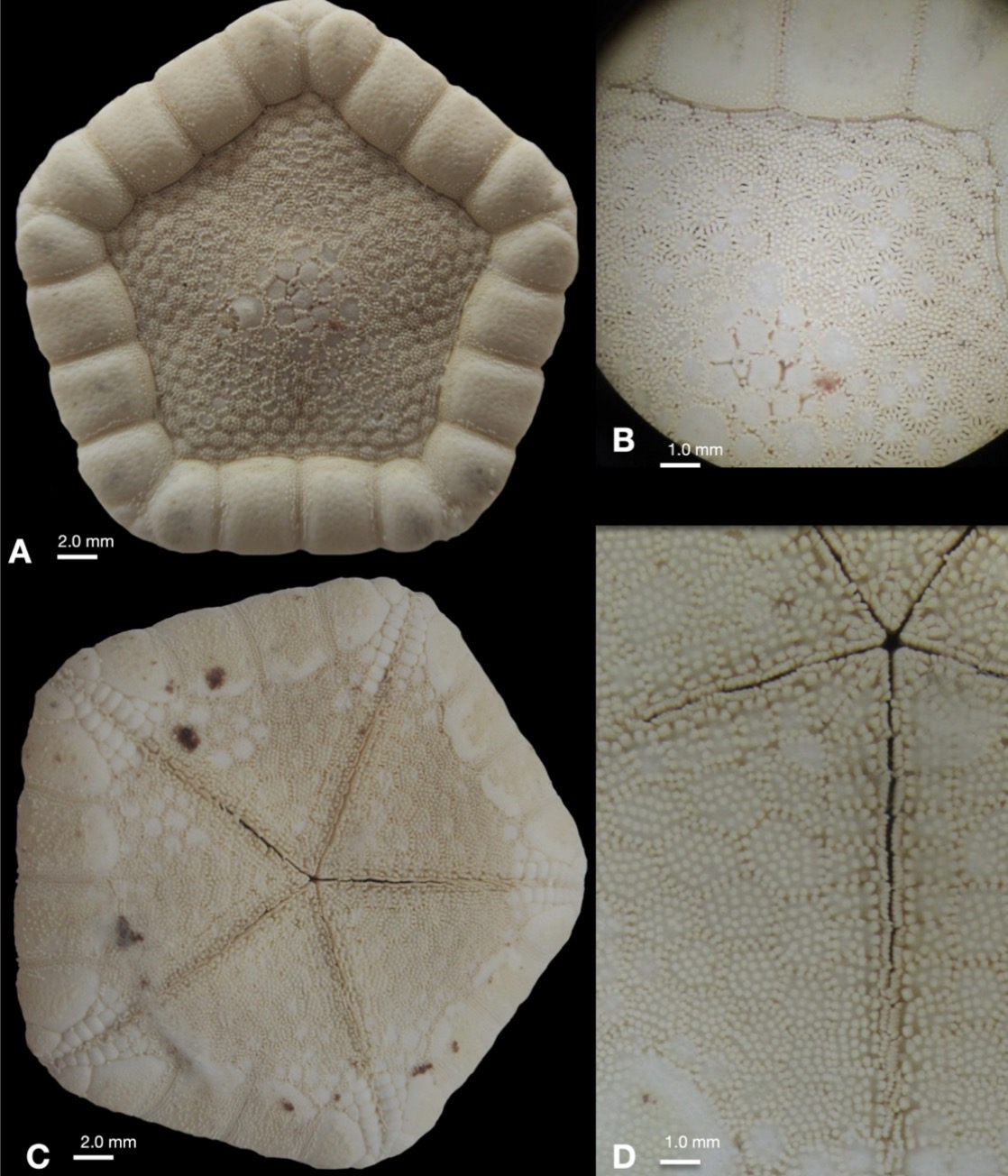
- Alloceramaster irritatus

Scientific classification
- Kingdom: Animalia
- Phylum: Echinodermata
- Class: Asteroidea
- Order: Valvatida
- Family: Goniasteridae
- Genus: Alloceramaster; Mah, 2025

= Alloceramaster =

Genus of sea stars

Alloceramaster is a genus of sea stars in the family Goniasteridae.

== Taxonomy and systematics ==
The genus Alloceramaster was described by Mah in 2025 to include Ceramaster-like taxa characterized by the presence of heteromorphic granules around the radial regions, specifically those with elongate to angular peripheral granules and more rounded to polygonal central granules on triangular or polygonal shaped plates, along with a bare spot on the superomarginal plate surface. It also differs from Sphaeriodiscus by lacking enlarged penultimate or antipenultimate superomarginal plates and by having fewer marginal plates per interradius with a bald or sparsely granular superomarginal surface.

== Description ==
The genus diagnosis describes an overall body form that is pentagonal or weakly stellate, with few known adults larger than 5 cm. Arm tips are blunt, and interradial arcs are weakly curved to straight. Two distinct types of abactinal accessories are present: rectangular to rhombic shaped granules forming a periphery around papular, radially positioned plates, and round to polygonal granules around the remainder of the plates. Marginal plates per interradius (arm tip to arm tip) number 6–18, with an elevated bald region on the plate surface that may be bare or covered with widely spaced granules. Actinal plates are quadrate to polygonal and covered by granules. Furrow spines number 2 to 9 and are blunt. Subambulacral spines number 3 to 4.

== Species ==
The genus includes the following species:

- Alloceramaster affinis (Perrier, 1884)
- Alloceramaster grenadensis (Perrier, 1881)
- Alloceramaster irritatus (Clark & McKnight, 2001)
- Alloceramaster leios Mah, 2025
- Alloceramaster maui (McKnight, 1973)
- Alloceramaster minus Mah, 2025
- Alloceramaster pointsurae (Mah, 2016)
