= Dedham Granite =

- Stratigraphic range: Ediacaran
- Type: Geological formation

Lithology
- Primary: granite
- Other: diorite, quartz monzonite

Location
- Country: United States of America

Type section
- Named for: Dedham, Massachusetts

Dedham granite is a light grayish-pink to greenish-gray, equigranular to slightly porphyritic, variably altered, granite south and west of Boston, named for the town of Dedham, Massachusetts.

== Geological History ==
The Dedham granite was formed during the Ediacaran Period of the Precambrian era about 610 million years ago and is one of the oldest rocks in the Boston basin. Dedham granites to the south and west of the basin are older outcrops from around 630 million years ago, while outcrops to the north of the basin are younger and closer to 596 million years old. The Dedham granite formed due to the interactions of two land structures - the Avalon microcontinent and the Gondwana supercontinent. There was an early collision along the Bloody Bluff Fault that damaged the continental shelf of the Gondwana supercontinent. During the collision large amounts of magma came from the Avalon volcanic chain and swallowed the edge of the continental shelf which created deposits of Dedham granite throughout Massachusetts. Some outcrops on the Avalon terrane were formed differently, through magma intrusion during the Precambrian era.

During this time the supercontinent, Pangea, was still intact. This is why there are also deposits of Dedham granite found in Africa since the formation of the rock occurred before the major continental movement.

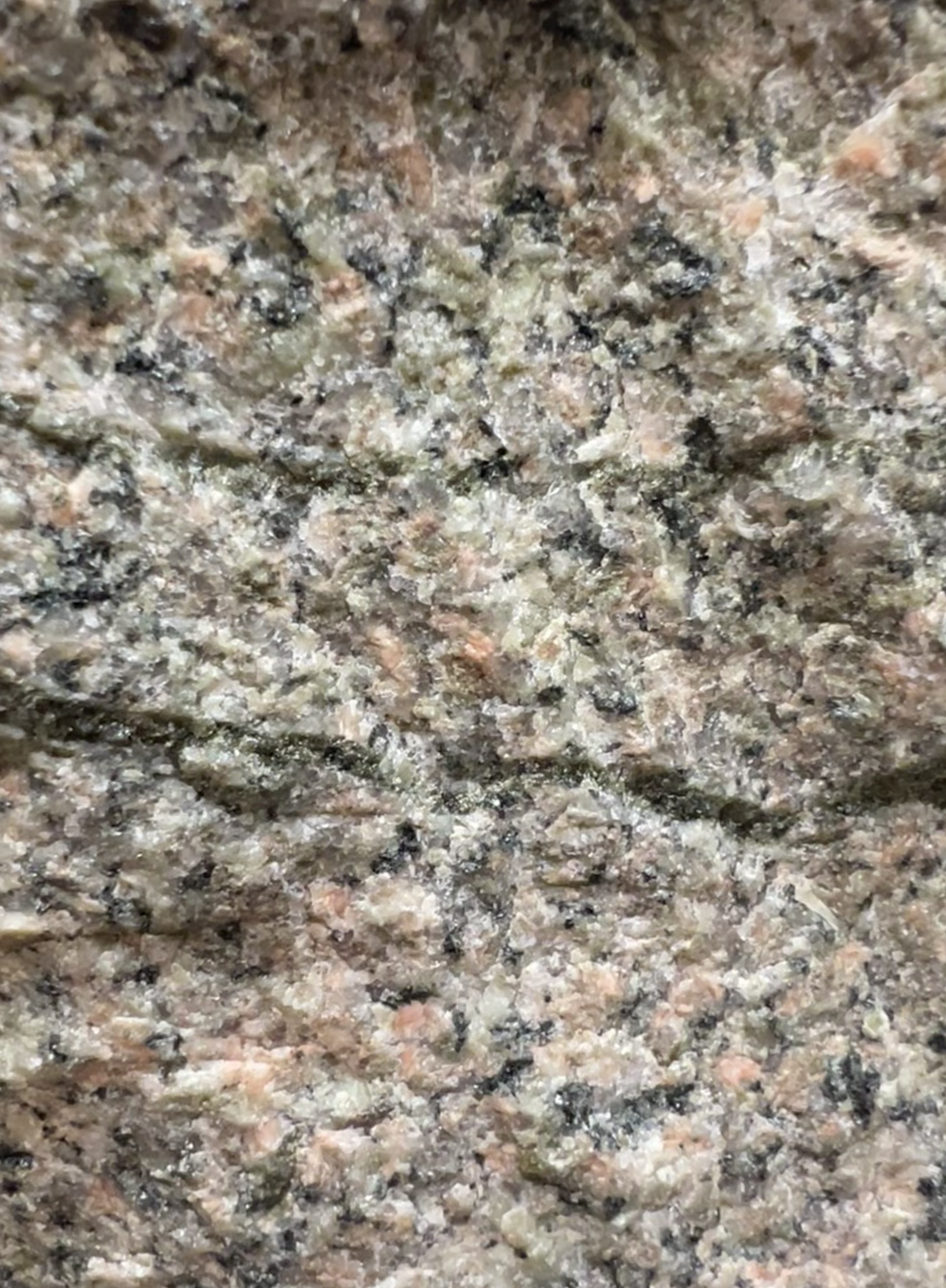
Close up of Dedham Granite including a visible epidote/chlorite vein

== Geological Makeup ==
Dedham Granite is a pink to gray medium to coarse grained igneous rock. It is phaneritic, meaning that the crystals are coarse enough to be seen with the naked eye. It is a two mica granite which means there are amounts of both muscovite mica and sericite present. There are also large amounts of quartz and Feldspar (mainly K-feldspar). There are deposits of epidote and chlorite throughout some samples of Dedham Granite. Typically these deposits manifest as green colored veins throughout the rock. Veins typically enter rocks as Hydrothermals when the minerals in the granite were crystallized from hot water or other hot liquids passing through the rock. For Dedham granite alterations of K-feldspar and plagioclase feldspar allow for the formation of the epidote/chlorite vein. Dedham granite typically lacks a magnetic pull meaning that it contains amounts of ilmenite and lacks magnetite.

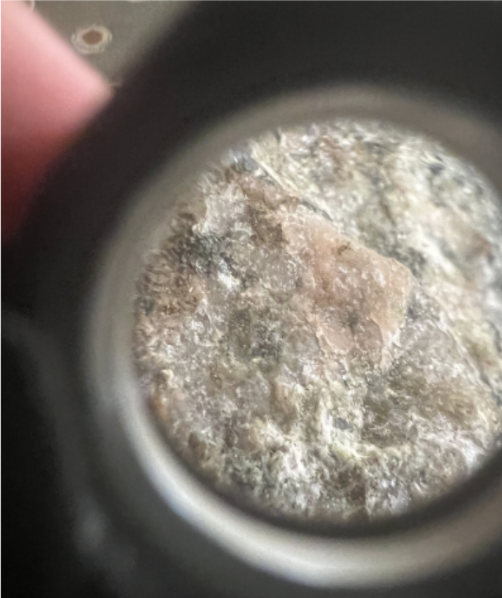
Close up of a k-feldspar crystal in a Dedham granite sample - shows phaneritic texture

== Qualities ==
Dedham Granite includes dioritic rock near Scituate and Cohasset and Barefoot Hills Quartz Monzonite. Intrudes Zdi, Zgb, Zb, Zv. Extensive calc-alkaline plutons separated by Boston basin have long been mapped as Dedham. Those to the north of Boston and studied by the US Geological Survey, are referred to as Dedham North. Crystallization ages for the Dedham North suite (based on titanites and zircons) have been determined at 607+/-4 Ma, while ages for the Lynn are slightly younger at 596+/-3 Ma. Both are clearly part of the Late Proterozoic magmatic event.

Dates on two samples from Sheffield Heights indicate that the diorite and granite are part of the Dedham North suite. The Dedham south and west of Boston has been dated at 630+/15 Ma. Dedham North Granite has a compositionally highly variable suite ranging from leucogranites to granodiorites, tonalites, and quartz diorite. The granites originated by partial melting of a sedimentary protolith, while the intermediate members show a mixing of granitic magma and mafic magma.

== Uses and Locations ==
The rock has been used for many notable building projects in and around Dedham. It was used for St. Mary's Church (1880), St. Paul's Church (1858), Memorial Hall (1868), the Boston and Providence Railroad station (1882), the Dedham Public Library (1888), and Trinity Church in Copley Square.

There are various outcrops located in the towns surrounding Dedham including Franklin and Medfield. The general area of dedham granite stretches from Dedham MA down to Franklin MA including Medfield MA and parts of Norwood MA. Westwood MA and the surrounding area has outcrops that are typically not Dedham granite despite being surrounded by it.

There are several pieces of it arranged decoratively along East Street in Dedham, between High and Avery Streets. These pieces were remnants of the railroad abutment that was dismantled in 2008. Plymouth Rock is also a piece of Dedham Granite, having been moved to the coast by a glacier 20,000 years ago.
