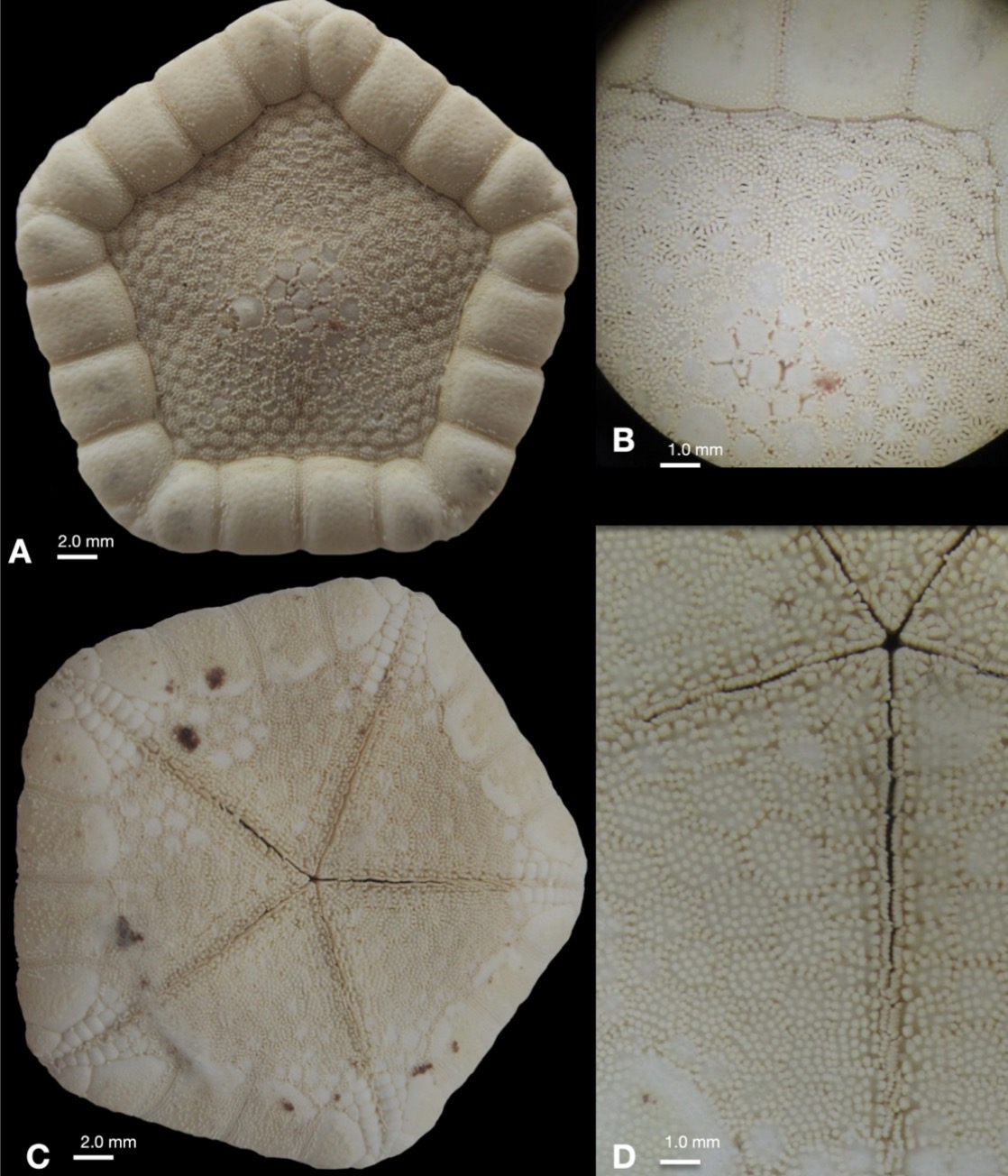

Scientific classification
- Kingdom: Animalia
- Phylum: Echinodermata
- Class: Asteroidea
- Order: Valvatida
- Family: Goniasteridae
- Genus: Alloceramaster
- Species: A. irritatus

Binomial name
- Alloceramaster irritatus (Clark & McKnight, 2001)

Synonyms
- Spheriodiscus irritatus Clark & McKnight, 2001

= Alloceramaster irritatus =

Species of sea star

Alloceramaster irritatus is a species of sea star in the family Goniasteridae found southeast of Norfolk Island and off New Caledonia.

== Description ==
The species has a pentagonal body. Abactinal plates are covered by a granular layer that forms a discrete cover over individual plates. Radial plates are wide, round to polygonal, and display peripheral rectangular granules. There are 6 superomarginal plates and 8 to 9 inferomarginal plates (with the distalmost small, upturned, and adjacent to the terminal plate). Superomarginals are covered by widely spaced granules (20–40) on a raised surface, otherwise covered by closely spaced round granules. Inferomarginal plates are numerous and dense, covered by polygonal to round granules. Furrow spines number 7 to 9 (distally 5 or 6). Subambulacral spines are arranged in 3 to 4 irregular series, decreasing in size from those adjacent to the furrow to those adjacent to the actinal plates.

== Distribution and habitat ==
This species is known from southeast of Norfolk Island (Norfolk Basin) at 530 meters and from off New Caledonia at depths of 428 to 470 meters.
