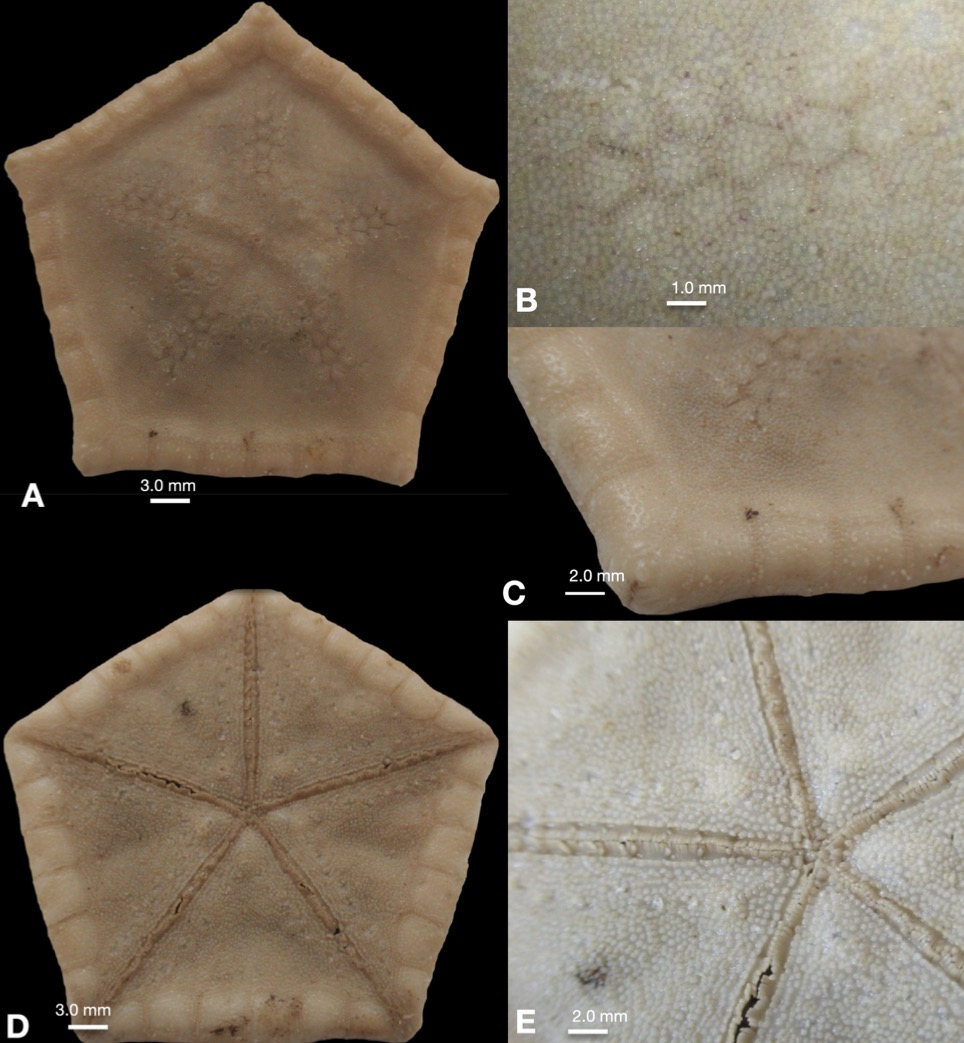

Scientific classification
- Kingdom: Animalia
- Phylum: Echinodermata
- Class: Asteroidea
- Order: Valvatida
- Family: Goniasteridae
- Genus: Alloceramaster
- Species: A. maui

Binomial name
- Alloceramaster maui (McKnight, 1973)

Synonyms
- Sphaeriodiscus maui McKnight, 1973

= Alloceramaster maui =

Species of sea star

Alloceramaster maui is a species of sea star in the family Goniasteridae. It is found off New Caledonia and near New Zealand (Aotea Seamount and Macauley Island in the Kermadec Islands) at depths of 758–1180 meters.

== Description ==
The species has a pentagonal body. The abactinal surface has a relatively dense granular cover that obscures boundaries between plates. Radial plates are triangular to "kite-shaped" with narrow angular peripheral granules and central granules that are round. Superomarginal plates number 6 to 10 per interradius at R=3.5. Furrow spines number 8 or 9. Subambulacral spines are arranged in 2 to 4 rows, each with 4 or 5 granules.

== Distribution and habitat ==
This species is known from off New Caledonia at depths of 758–780 meters and from west of Auckland, New Zealand (Aotea Seamount) and Macauley Island in the Kermadec Group at 926–1180 meters.
