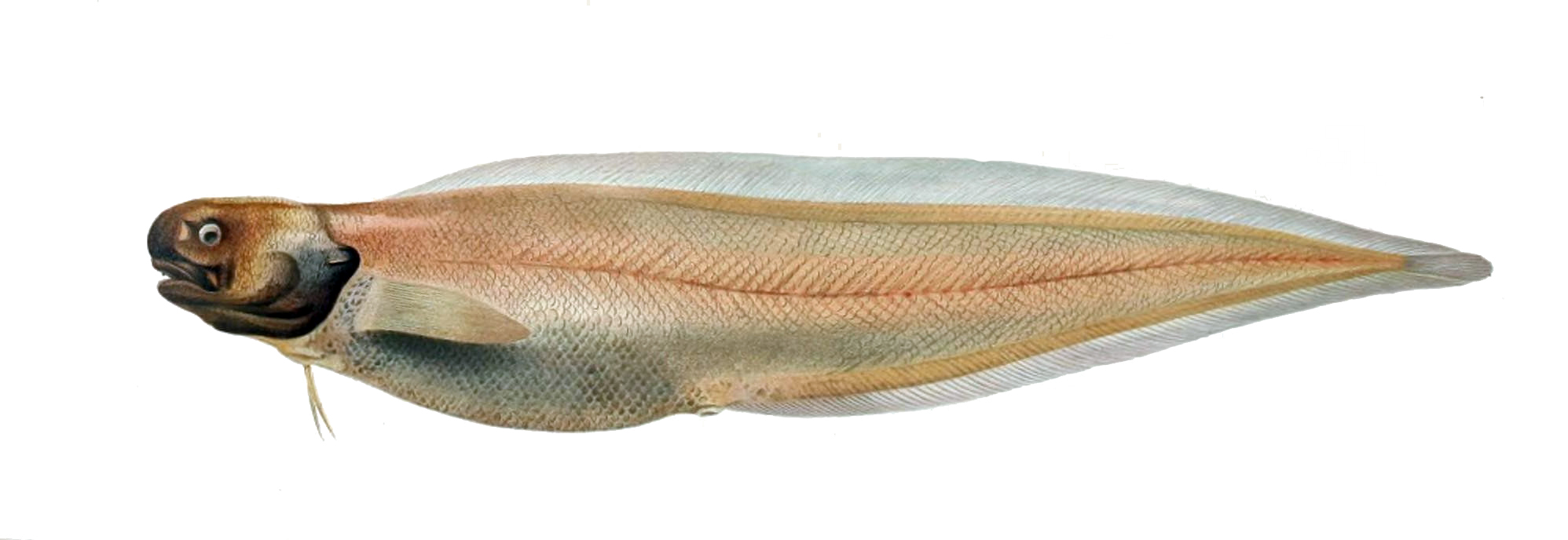
- Barathrites iris

Scientific classification
- Kingdom: Animalia
- Phylum: Chordata
- Class: Actinopterygii
- Order: Ophidiiformes
- Family: Ophidiidae
- Subfamily: Neobythitinae
- Genus: Barathrites; Zugmayer, 1911

Type species
- Barathrites iris Zugmayer, 1911

= Barathrites =

Genus of fishes

Barathrites is a genus of cusk-eels found in deep waters of the northwest Atlantic Ocean.

== Species ==
There are currently two recognized species in this genus:

- Barathrites iris Zugmayer, 1911
- Barathrites parri Nybelin, 1957
