= Norfolk Basin (Oceania) =

Oceanic basin in the south-west Pacific Ocean between New Caledonia and New Zealand

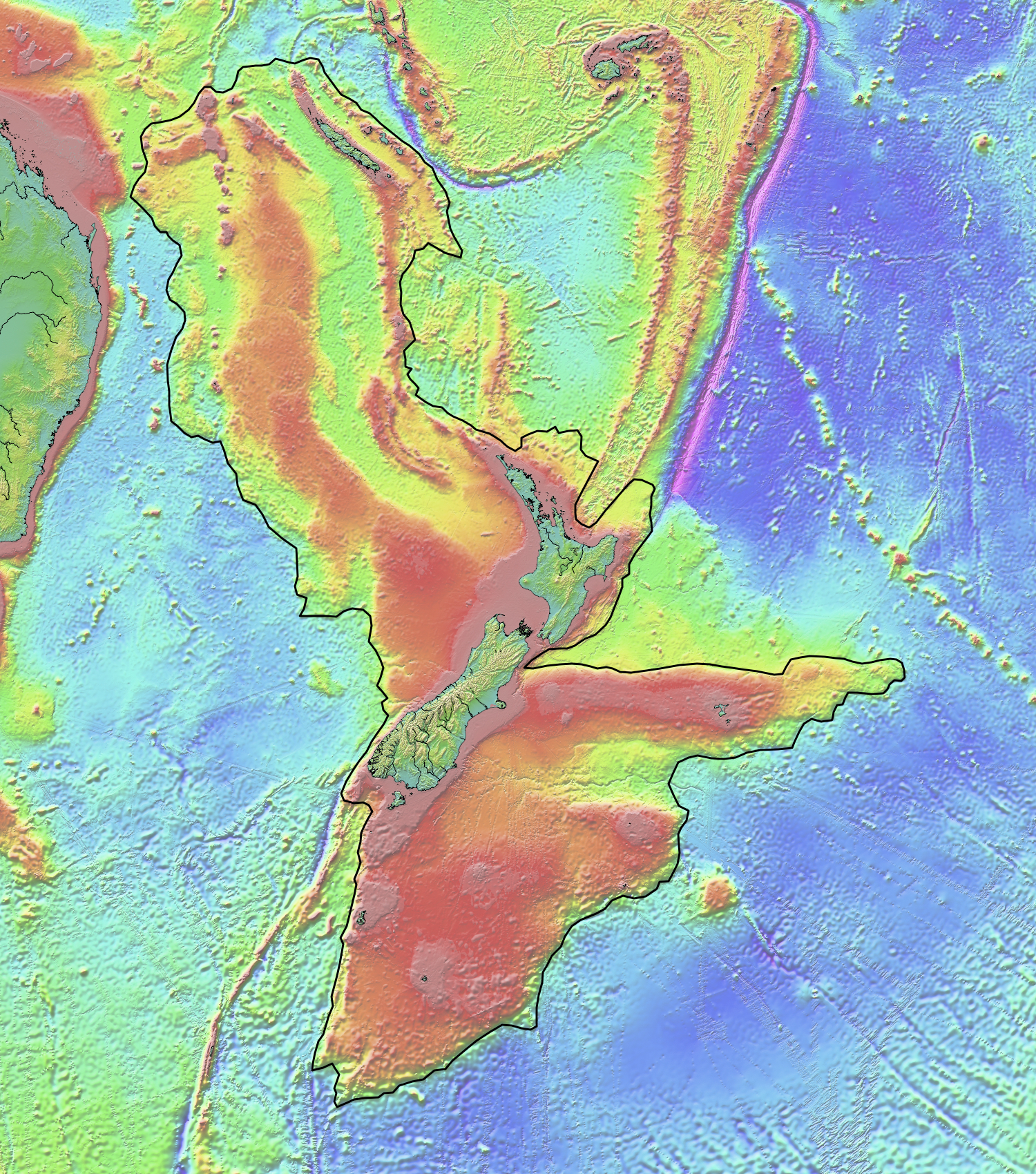
The Norfolk basins in relation to other South Pacific Ocean, Coral Sea and Tasman Sea seafloor features. The Zealandia continental margin is shown in black.

The Norfolk Basin, which has been subdivided into the North Norfolk Basin and South Norfolk Basin, is an ocean floor sedimentary basin between the Norfolk Ridge to the east and the Three Kings Ridge to the west, on the edge of the submerged continent of Zealandia. The northern boundary is the Cook fracture zone and the southern is the Regina ridge projecting from Northland Peninsula, New Zealand. While it has back-arc basin characteristics its formation and structure are not able to be explained by historic back-arc basin theory. (Note: In other words the basin area geology has controversial elements. Recent peer reviewed literature continues to be worded without the commitment to one geological model.)

== Geography ==
The basin is 500 km (310 mi) wide by 720 km (450 mi) long between the above sea features of the south of the island of Grande Terre of New Caledonia, and the northern tip of the North Island of New Zealand. The basin depth is between 2.0 and 4.3 km (1.2 and 2.7 mi) although seamount features are less. While the deeper South Norfolk Basin has a relatively simple basin bathymetry, the northern basin has much more complex bathymetry and contains several named features. (Note: The naming of features is inconsistent in the recent geological and oceanographic literature. Where a feature name has not been adopted as an oceanographic term in this article its descriptive name is not capitalised. Otherwise this article adopts Australasian convention of capitalising geographical features. This appears consistent with wikipedia guidance as most American literature use of sentence case will refer to another geographic feature, the continental Norfolk Basin in Massachusetts, which also has geologic northern and southern portions. The reader should refer to maps in the original sources where ambiguity applies. The term northern Norfolk Basin in this article is not the same as North Norfolk Basin or Central Norfolk Basin and is a purely descriptive term used to try to help the reader navigate any inconsistency. The use of the term Norfolk Basin to refer just to the South Norfolk Basin was not identified in the recent geological or oceanographic literature.) For the purposes of this article, the Norfolk Basin is within the area 27°0′0″S 168°0′0″E to 33°0′0″S 171°0′0″E. Oceanographically the two subsidiary basins have been defined as being:

- North Norfolk Basin within the area 27°0′0″S 168°0′0″E to 29°0′0″S 170°0′0″E
- South Norfolk Basin within the area 30°0′0″S 168°0′0″E to 33°0′0″S 171°0′0″E

To its north beyond the Cook fracture zone and west beyond the Three Kings Ridge is the South Fiji Basin. To its east beyond the Norfolk Ridge is the central part of the New Caledonia Trough.

The northern Norfolk Basin contains three plateau regions with fairly uniform depths between 2.0 and 3.1 km (1.2 and 1.9 mi). The most northwestern is the north Norfolk plateau north of the North Norfolk Basin proper. The 75 km (47 mi) wide Kingstone plateau is a central region north of the line of the Nepean saddle that divides the South Norfolk Basin from the North Norfolk Basin. The western Nepean saddle is adjacent to the Norfolk and Philip islands. The Nepean Saddle becomes the Bates plateau between it and the Three Kings Ridge. Seamounts along the line of the Nepean saddle and Bates plateau approach within about 1 km (0.62 mi) of the seas surface. The Bates plateau has two troughs on its east and west. The western trough has been called the Philip trough and north of the Bates plateau towards the Cook fracture zone reaches depths of more than 3.4 km (2.1 mi). It joins here the even deeper Cagou Trough which has depths of more than 3.7 km (2.3 mi). West of the northern Cagou trough there is an area at basin depths adjacent to the Three Kings Ridge that has plateau characteristics and is called the Three Kings terrace. A northern basin extending to the northeast from the North Norfolk Basin has by some authors simply been included as a central Norfolk basin feature or called the Forester basin (27°30′0″S 169°30′0″E). This has a rugged bathymetry.

=== Names ===
The North Norfolk Basin has also been called the Central Norfolk Basin, although the later name also includes in some recent mappings the plateaus and Forester basin. The South Norfolk Basin has also been called the Southern Norfolk Basin, Gazelle Basin, Gazelle Deep and Three Kings Basin, as well as historically just Norfolk Basin. Other names for geological features in the basins exist some of which may not be used consistently.

== Geology ==
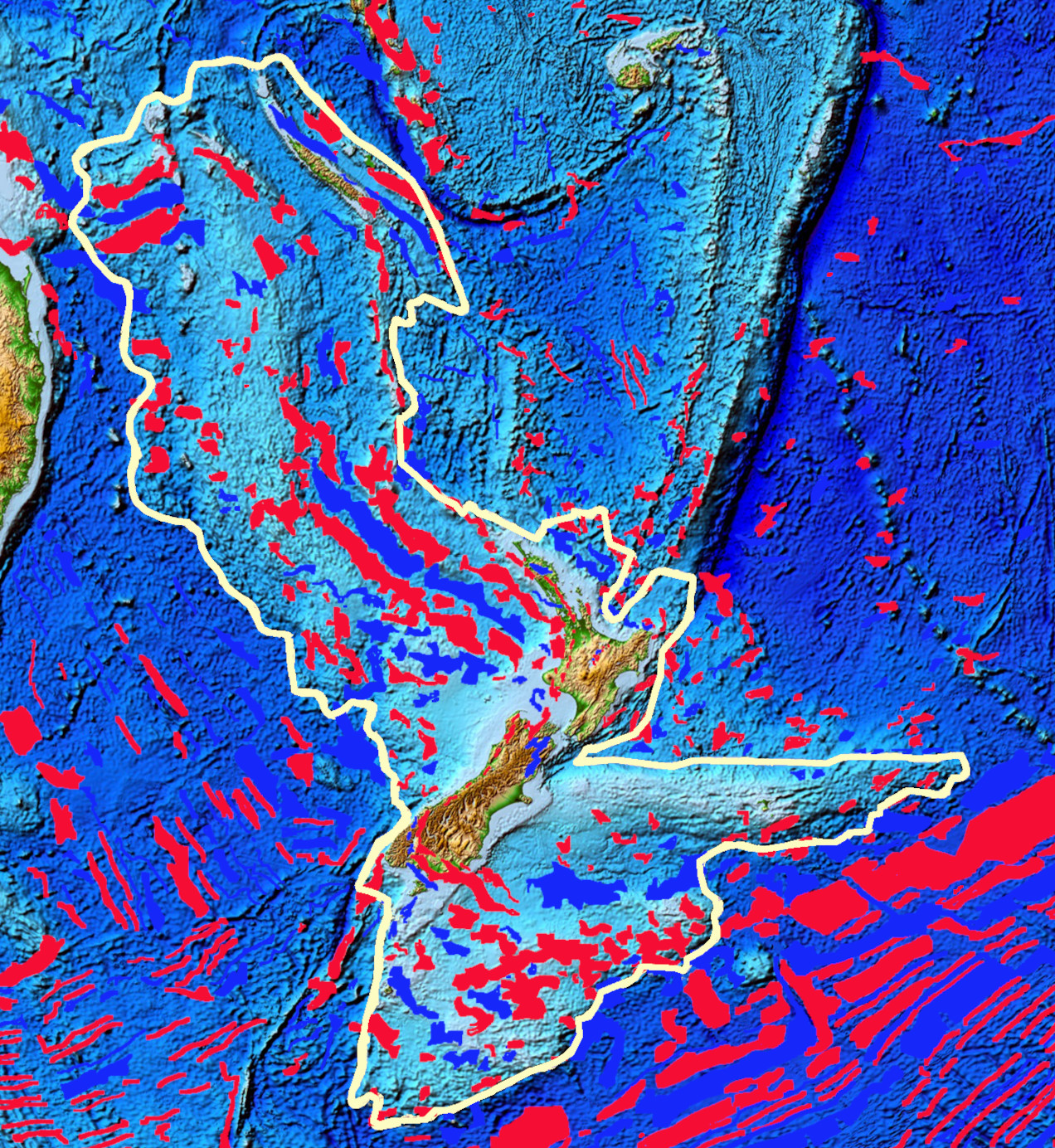
White outline Zealandia. Red more than 100nT magnetic anomaly, Blue less than -100nT magnetic anomaly

The basin is a Cretaceous to Miocene structure at the western edge of the continental crust of the submerged continent of Zealandia. Sediments are relatively thin at about 1 km (0.62 mi) thickness and it has no strong magnetic anomalies. Definite oceanic crust samples have been obtained from much of the basins sea floor as have some continental type rocks. The prevalent view is that this means the basement was formed mainly from oceanic crust during the Cretaceous normal superchron before 83.5 million years ago although it does not totally exclude that much of the crust may be continental in origin. The measured crustal thickness in the northern sectors vary between 12 and 8 km (7.5 and 5.0 mi) and are thicker than typical mid ocean oceanic crust. The three plateaus within the basin could be best explained as continental fragments and it seems that the basin has both oceanic and continental components. The Nepean saddle, that separates the two main basins, the Cook fracture zone to the north, and the Three Kings Ridge, and the adjacent Cagou Trough to the east are not magnetically quiet, and this relates to magmatic intrusions and seamount formation. The center of the basin is 1,150 km (710 mi) to the east of the present trenches of the Kermadec–Tonga subduction zone and so nowhere near the slab contours of the subducted Pacific plate, as would be the case if it was a standard theory back-arc basin. While back-arc basins can form up to 1,500 km (930 mi) the age progression observed across the South Fiji Basin does not fit well as the age of the basins then does not decrease toward the trench. To explain this the back arc extension must have occurred either behind an active proto Tonga Trench or behind a now extinct trench. It is possible that as well as extension convergence continued southward from New Caledonia and into the Norfolk Basin. The rugged bathymetry of the area that some have called the Forester basin has been interpreted as abyssal hill fabric which would requires a spreading centre in the northern Norfolk Basin. The southern limits of the South Norfolk Basin are the Regina ridge which is formed over what is known in the geological literature as the Vening Meinesz fracture zone or Vening Meinesz fault zone.

It is speculated that the basin may be related to subduction that started north of Norfolk Ridge and that propagated along the ridge during the period from 40 to 35 million years ago, with slow propagation to Northland between 35 and 25 million years ago. It then formed the basin during the period 28 to 16 million years ago as a Miocene extension basin due to subducted oceanic crust slab roll–back. The basin had spreading centres, the Loyalty–Three Kings ridge was its volcanic arc. Hyper-extended blocks were created south of the Cook fracture zone within the Norfolk Basin explaining the crustal fragments of Zealandia found in the Norfolk Basin.

The Cagou Trough as a major north–south oriented feature at the eastern side of the basin has a normal fault visible on seismic reflection on its western flank. The seismic studies are consistent with either oceanic crust or very thinned continental crust here.

Some seamounts in the area of the basin have atypical Oligocene age magma geochemistry, so while being subduction-related, are possibly caused by reactivation and roll-back of a slab that had been already subducted and partially dehydrated in the Cretaceous. Other seamounts to the west of the basin on the western side of the Norfolk Ridge have ocean island basalt characteristics that mean they are not subduction related. Another explanation for the seamounts in the basin is that they are related to a mantle plume.

=== Tectonics ===
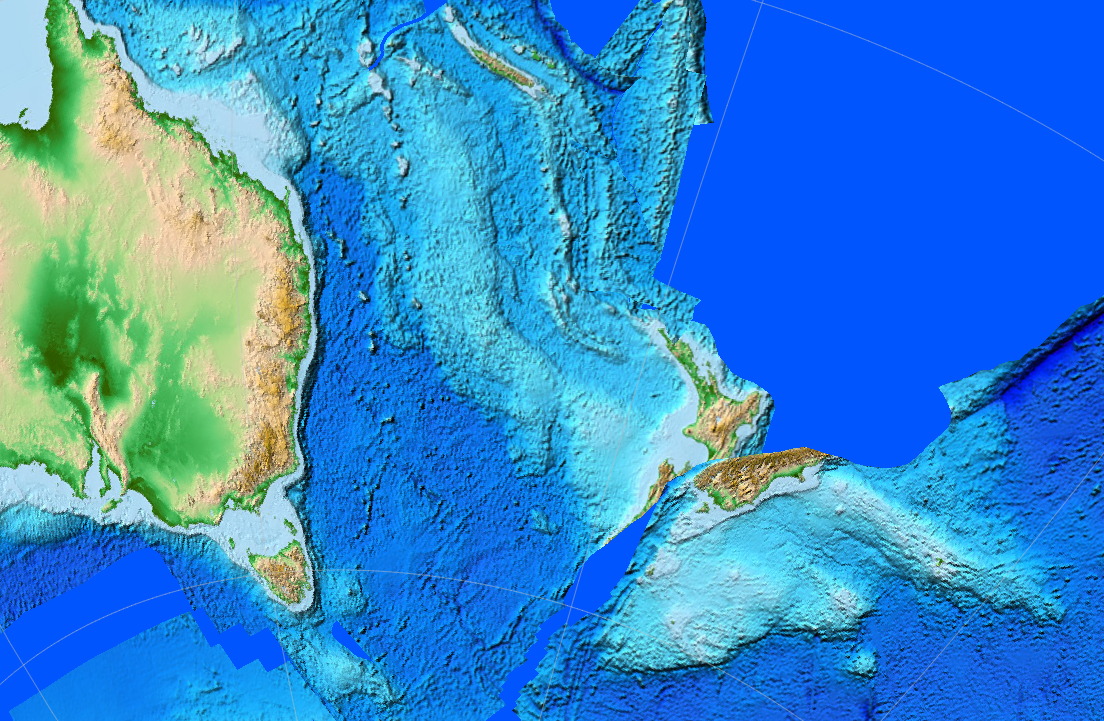
The Norfolk Basin of about 30 million years ago was narrower.

In this region of the Pacific there is general agreement on the main tectonic phases, but not on finer details. Pacific basin subducting slab dipped southwest beneath the eastern margin of Gondwana in the period from 260 to 110 million years ago. From about 110 to 100 million years ago the convergence changed to being extensional and intracontinental rifting became established along much of the eastern Gondwana margin, at which time Zealandia began to separate from Gondwana. By the Late Cretaceous (83.5 million years ago) the eastern opening of the Tasman Sea from the Australian plate started. The Norfolk Basin position between New Caledonia and Northland, New Zealand, is important as northeastward dipping subduction to the east of New Caledonia may have started as early at 55 million years ago and resulted in overthrusting and ophiolite emplacement by 34 million years ago while Northland, New Zealand obduction with its ophiolite occurred between 24 and 21 million years ago. So at either end of the extension Norfolk Basin geological processes were dominated by convergence and obduction since the Eocene. The tectonics of the possible extension processes in the basin itself have been discussed earlier. For other context of the extinct Lau-Colville Ridge arc, relating to later Pacific plate subduction under the Australian plate, this was mainly between 14 and 6 million years ago although late volcanism persisted until 2.5 million years ago.
