= Barathrites parri =

Scientific classification
- Kingdom: Animalia
- Phylum: Chordata
- Class: Actinopterygii
- Order: Ophidiiformes
- Family: Ophidiidae
- Genus: Barathrites
- Species: B. parri

Binomial name
- Barathrites parri Nybelin, 1957

Species of Actinopterygii

Barathrites parri is a species of cusk-eel native to the north-western Atlantic.
