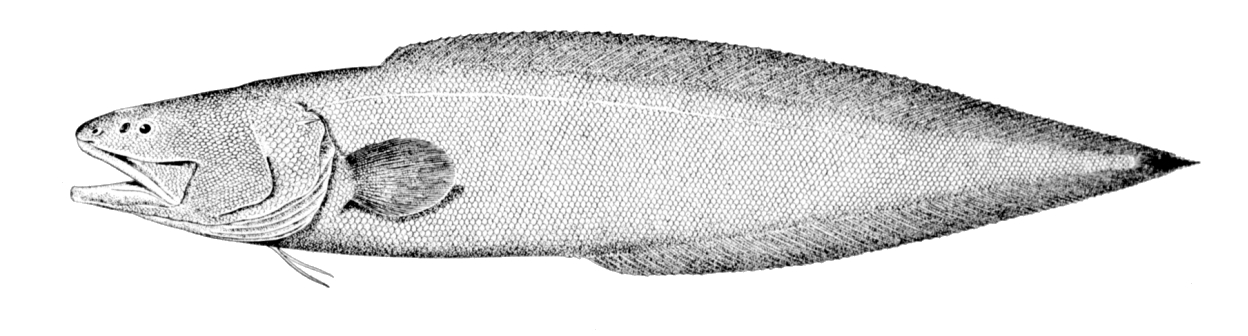

Conservation status
- Least Concern (IUCN 3.1)

Scientific classification
- Kingdom: Animalia
- Phylum: Chordata
- Class: Actinopterygii
- Order: Ophidiiformes
- Family: Ophidiidae
- Genus: Bassogigas
- Species: B. gillii

Binomial name
- Bassogigas gillii Goode & Bean, 1896

= Bassogigas gillii =

Species of fish

Bassogigas gillii is a species of cusk-eel found in the Indian, Pacific Ocean, and Atlantic Oceans at depths of from 637 to 2,239 metres (2,090 to 7,350 ft).

== Etymology ==
The generic name "Bassogigas" comes from a combination of two Latin words: bassus, which means "deep" and gigas which means "giant". The specific name honours the American ichthyologist Theodore Gill (1837-1914) who named the genus Bassogigas in an unpublished manuscript.

== Description ==
This species grows to a length of 85 centimetres (33 in) TL. B. gillii has no dorsal or anal spines but does have between 103 and 110 dorsal rays and 83–88 anal rays. Its spinal column is contains 60–64 vertebra and its long lateral line (up to 84% the total length) helps to distinguish it from its relative, Bassogigas walkeri.

== Distribution and habitat ==
B. gillii is found throughout the Indian and west Pacific Oceans from the tip of South Africa to New Caledonia including Madagascar. It is also found in the western Atlantic Ocean, though not the eastern, and is known from the United States, Bahamas, Cuba and Brazil. Other important areas where B. gillii can be found include the Gulf of Mexico, Bear Seamount and Agulhas Current. It can general be found living on or near the bottom at depths between 637 and 2,239 metres (2,090 and 7,350 ft).
