= Bellingham Conglomerate =

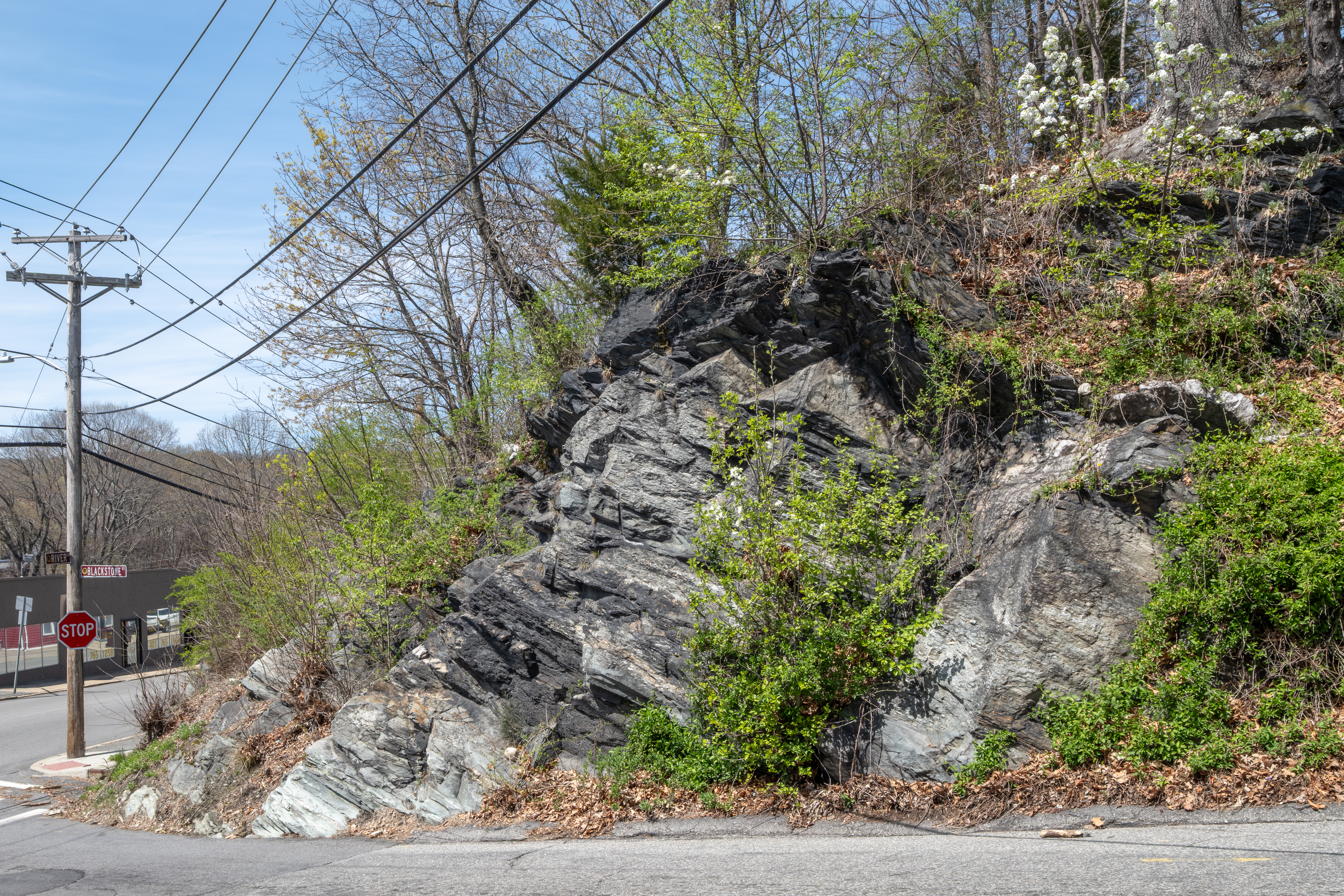
An outcrop of Bellingham Conglomerate at the intersection of Blackstone Street and River Street in Woonsocket, Rhode Island

The Bellingham Conglomerate is a stratigraphic unit in eastern Massachusetts and northern Rhode Island in the United States. It is mainly a conglomerate and greywacke, exclusive to the Bellingham Basin.

The conglomerate has granite and quartzite pebbles in a mica matrix, which are sourced from the neighboring Blackstone Group and Milford Granite (which has locally unique blue quartz). The two main rock types are interbedded with chlorite phyllite, which contains minerals such as muscovite, quartz, zoisite, magnetite and chloritoid.

The age of the formation has historically been correlated with Pennsylvanian-age rocks of the Narragansett Basin, but it may be the same age as the Roxbury Conglomerate in the Boston Basin (i.e., Neoproterozoic).

== Outcrops ==
The conglomerate outcrops are found in a few locations. Two notable examples include the intersection of Blackstone Street and River Street in Woonsocket (pictured), and an exposure on the east side of Woonsocket Hill.
