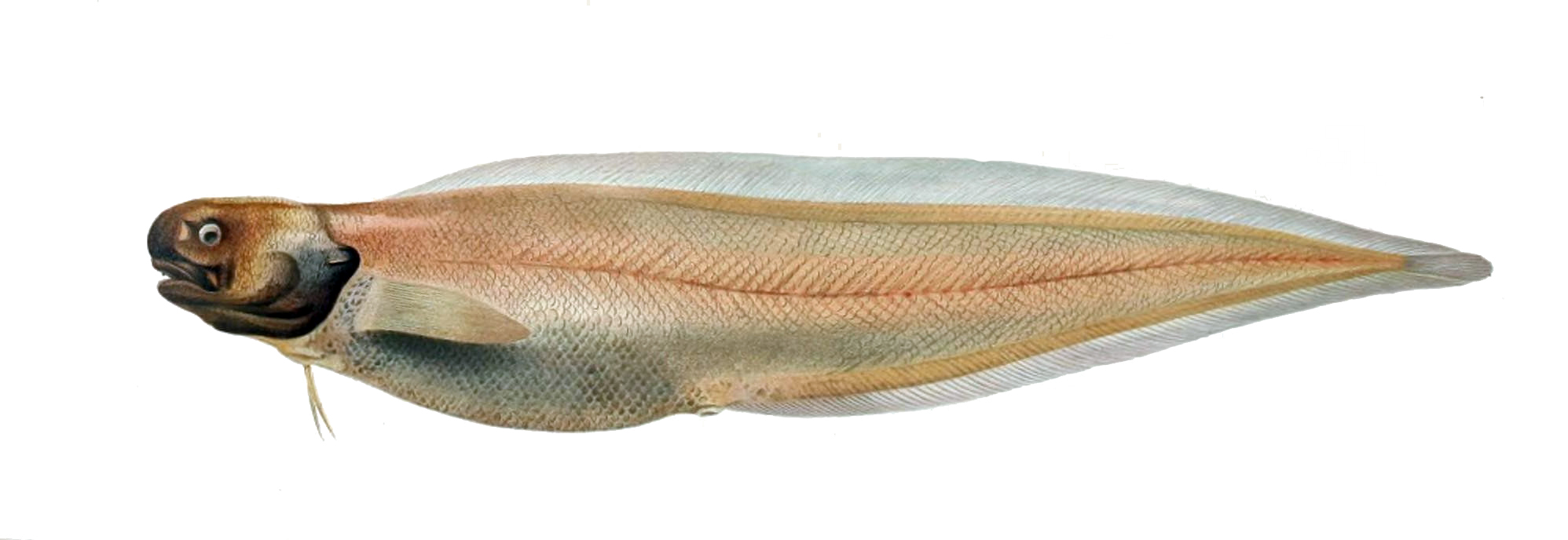

Scientific classification
- Kingdom: Animalia
- Phylum: Chordata
- Class: Actinopterygii
- Order: Ophidiiformes
- Family: Ophidiidae
- Genus: Barathrites
- Species: B. iris

Binomial name
- Barathrites iris Zugmayer, 1911

= Barathrites iris =

Species of fish

Barathrites iris is a species of fish in the family Ophidiidae.
