= Bassozetus robustus =

Conservation status
- Least Concern (IUCN 3.1)

Scientific classification
- Kingdom: Animalia
- Phylum: Chordata
- Class: Actinopterygii
- Order: Ophidiiformes
- Family: Ophidiidae
- Genus: Bassozetus
- Species: B. robustus

Binomial name
- Bassozetus robustus Smith & Radcliffe, 1913

Species of fish

Bassozetus robustus, the robust assfish, is a species of cusk-eel (Ophidiidae) found in deep tropical and temperate waters around the world.
