= Mattapan Volcanic Complex =

The Mattapan Volcanic Complex is a suite of Proterozoic felsic volcanic rocks in the U.S. state of Massachusetts. It is situated at the edge of the Boston Basin into the Blue Hills and lying unconformably atop the Dedham Granite. The complex is overlain by the Roxbury Conglomerate. In terms of its petrology, the rock types and compositions in the Mattapan Volcanic Complex are very similar to the Lynn Volcanic Complex and include ancient rhyolite and rhyodacite flows, some of which have porphyry characteristics, welded ash flows, tuff, breccia, extrusion domes and breccia pipes.

The Mattapan Volcanic Complex rhyolites are thinner and have less varied composition and texture than the Lynn complex. The complex also includes laminated argillite and volcanic conglomerate, which is easily confused with the Roxbury Conglomerate.

The complex is up to a kilometer thick in central areas of Boston, 600 meters thick in Hyde Park, close to Milton and fades out entirely eastward toward Hingham and Nantasket.
