= Lynn Volcanic Complex =

Geological formation

The Lynn Volcanic Complex is a suite of Proterozoic felsic volcanic rocks, situated in a block north of the Boston Basin. It includes rhyolite, rhyodacite, welded ash flows, tuff and some andesite and basalt (although some of these may actually be part of the Middlesex Fells Volcanic Complex). Unlike the neighboring Mattapan Volcanic Complex, the Lynn complex lacks volcanic breccia and has a greater variety of texture and composition in its rhyolitic rocks.

It lies unconformably on top of the Dedham Granite. A mass of Dedham Granite at Pine Hill in Medford, Massachusetts contains inclusions of the Lynn complex.
