= Newbury Volcanic Complex =

Strip of volcanic materials and sediments in Massachusetts

- Stratigraphic range: Late Silurian, ~ 422 Ma
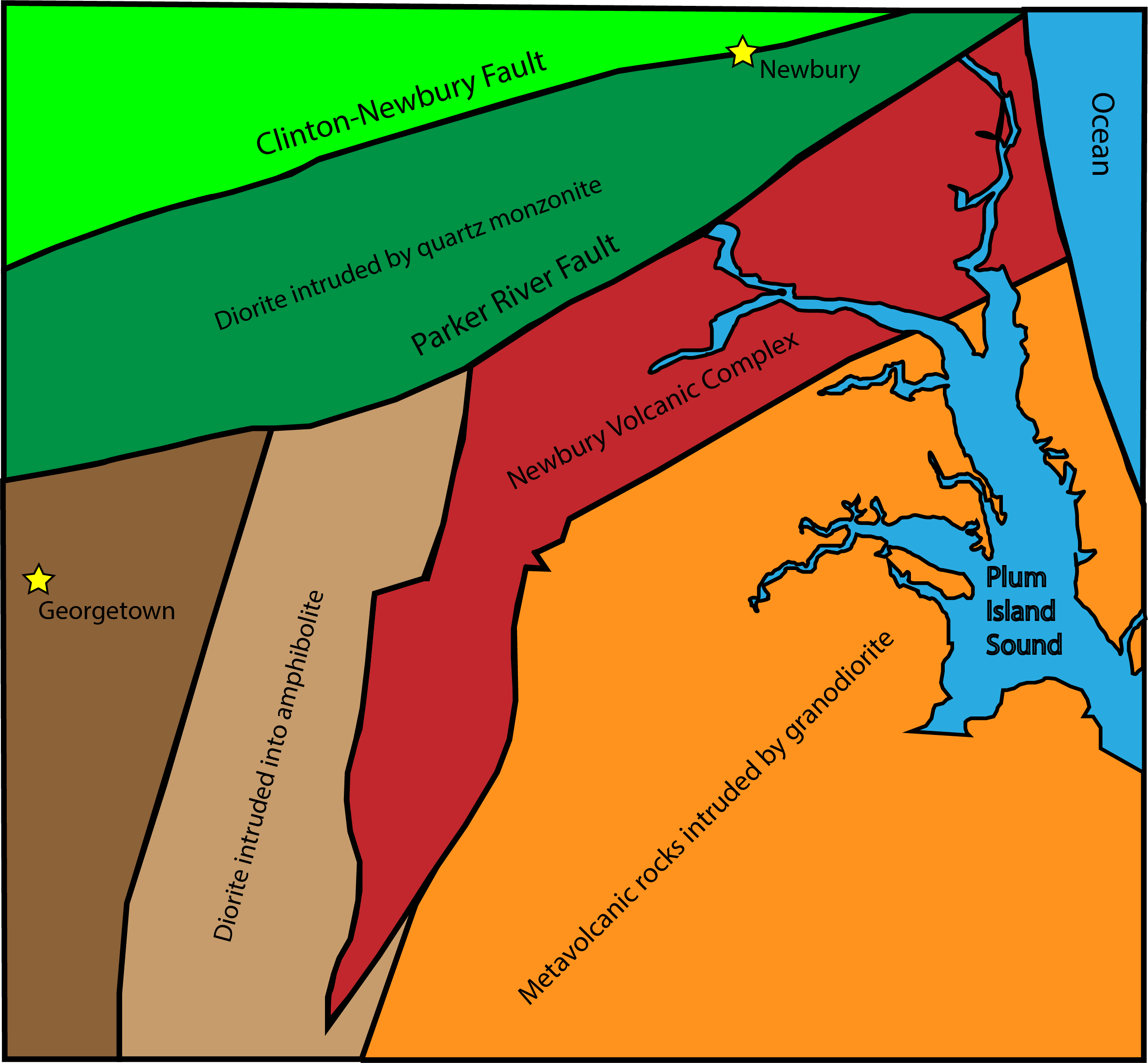
- Type: Geological formation
- Thickness: up to 4,400 metres (14,440 ft)

Location
- Coordinates: 42.75°N 70.875°W
- Region: Northeastern Massachusetts
- Extent: 16 kilometres (9.9 mi)

Type section
- Named for: Newbury, Massachusetts
- Country: USA

The Newbury Volcanic Complex, also known as the Newbury Formation or the Newbury Volcanics, is a 16 km long, 3 km wide strip of volcanic materials and sediments in northeastern Massachusetts. The complex is made up of ten stratified members and is estimated to be between 3770 m 4400 m in thickness. Due to the fossils that have been found in this formation and with the help of radiometric dating, the Newbury Volcanic Complex has been determined to be Silurian in age, which provides useful information for interpreting the effects of the Acadian orogeny on the New England area.

== Stratigraphy and petrology ==
The Newbury Volcanic Complex is made up of ten stratified members and an eleventh, younger cross-cutting layer of rhyolite pods. All layers found within the Newbury Volcanic Complex are cut by faults. Due to faulting through the Newbury Volcanic Complex, the offset parts that would normally match with the original layering cannot be found. Some layers are not well defined or even missing since they have no visible outcrops.

=== Member 1. Rhyolite tuff ===
The rhyolite tuff member is the lowest stratigraphic exposure of the Newbury Volcanic Complex. This member is made up of glassy fragments of rhyolitic tuff that is heavily sheared and is crudely held together and is about 6 m in thickness and yellowish-brown to brownish-gray in color. It is inferred that this member was deposited by an ash flow.

=== Member 2. Fine-grained andesite ===
This member is an olive to olive-brown fine-grained andesitic rock layer which ranges from 45 to 150 m in thickness that lays overtop the rhyolite tuff. This member's main textures and structures have mostly been erased via low-grade metamorphism. An exposed outcrop at 80 m west of Highway 1 and north of the Parker River displays ribbing that is typically evident of bedding. Some portions of this member are made up of flow-banded lavas, which is evident from the orientation of thin lathes of plagioclase, while the other layers have a texture that resembles crystal tuffs, indicating that this member is made up of mudstones with thin lava deposits.

=== Member 3. Basalt flows ===
Member three consists of multiple greenish-black, fine-grained basalt flows that are 30 m or more in thickness, and the member itself is about 250 to 300 m in total thickness. The minerals that originally formed this section have since been replaced in the flow rocks, but remnants of thin strips of plagioclase and uniform grain size display a texture that of a basaltic rock. The borders between the basalt flows display signs of weathering before another flow layer was deposited. A portion of these flow layers are separated by thin zones of sediment which contain some fossils.

=== Member 4. Vitric rhyolite lapilli tuff ===
The next member is made of grayish-green, glassy volcanic tuff that is 0 to 52 m in thickness. Platy fragments are found somewhat aligned parallel to partings that can emulate bedding, but bedding structures in this member cannot be perceived. In the thin section, smoothly curving shards can be seen within the matrix, despite the heavy crystallization of this layer, and small (> 1 cm) volcanic fragments of recrystallized pumice and obsidian can be seen spread across the matrix.

=== Member 5. Basalt ===
Overlaying the rhyolite tuff is a 90 m thick member of dark-gray basaltic rock. Small outlines of thin plagioclase grains can be seen in thin sections of this rock. This portion of rock was deposited from a local flow or volcanic intrusion.

=== Member 6. Flow-banded rhyolite vitrophyre ===
The sixth member is a 580 to 670 m thick layer of rhyolite that is dense with large crystals and a glassy matrix and contains flow bands. This member is primarily grayish red in color, but there is a roughly 120 m thick portion of this member made up of basal tuffs that are yellow green to pale red purple in color. This member was originally deposited as flow-banded obsidian with ash-fall tuffs interspersed between obsidian layers. The layer of basal tuffs are likely ash-flow deposits.

=== Member 7. Porphyritic andesite ===
This member is the thickest member at 1650 or more m in thickness and most diverse member of the Newbury Volcanic Complex. It is worth noting that this portion of the Newbury Volcanic Complex is incomplete due being heavily faulted. This member contains dark gray andesite as well as stratified volcaniclastic layers that can be anywhere from fine-grained tuffs to boulder breccias. This member also contains a small amount of fossils.

=== Member 8. Siliceous siltstone ===
The siliceous siltstone member is not well understood, due to sparse outcrops, and information such as thickness and depositional boundaries are speculated from rubble in glacial till. The majority if this member is found in large, angular boulders deposited by glacial activity. The color of the rocks in this member vary from dark greenish grey, to purple, to olive black, to yellowish gray depending on the weathering of the surface. In thin section, silt to sand sized grains of quartz and plagioclase make up roughly 10 to 40 percent of the rock with a matrix of unidentifiable materials.

=== Member 9. Red mudstone ===
This member lies overtop the siliceous siltstone member, and is a grayish-red color. The distinguishing features between this member and the siliceous siltstone member is that the red mudstone member displays quartz and plagioclase in amounts of greater than 50 percent with weaker cementation. After a quarrying operation in this area, yellow-brown greywackes were found within this member.

=== Member 10. Calcareous mudstone ===
This member is made up of parallel beds ranging from 5 to 15 cm in thickness of silty limestone and calcareous mudstone. This member is estimated to be at least 90 m thick and potentially 300 m thick with estimations based on limestone rubble in soil.

=== Member 11. Micrographic rhyolite intrusions ===
The youngest member of the Newbury Volcanic Complex and is made up of various intrusions throughout the complex. The intrusions are pod-shaped and are made up of brownish-gray to orange-pink, extremely fine-grained, large felsites. The intrusions can range anywhere from 100 to 600 m in thickness and can be up to 1600 m in length.

== Fossils ==
The majority of fossils that are suitable for scientific use are found in thin sedimentary layers within the andesite member of the Newbury Volcanic Complex. The fossils found in the Newbury are of marine origin and are made up of various species of brachiopods, crinoids, and a species of gastropod.
