= Nantucket Basin =

Basin located off the shore of Massachusetts state on Nantucket island

The Nantucket Basin is a northeast trending basin, formed in the Triassic and Jurassic, buried beneath Atlantic Coastal Plain sediments under Nantucket. The basin is believed to be 25 kilometers wide and 100 kilometers long, containing sandstone and basalt. The rock units within it appear to dip north, based on seismic-reflection profiles and taken together the rocks are up to one kilometer thick. It is one of several failed Mesozoic rift basins in Massachusetts.
