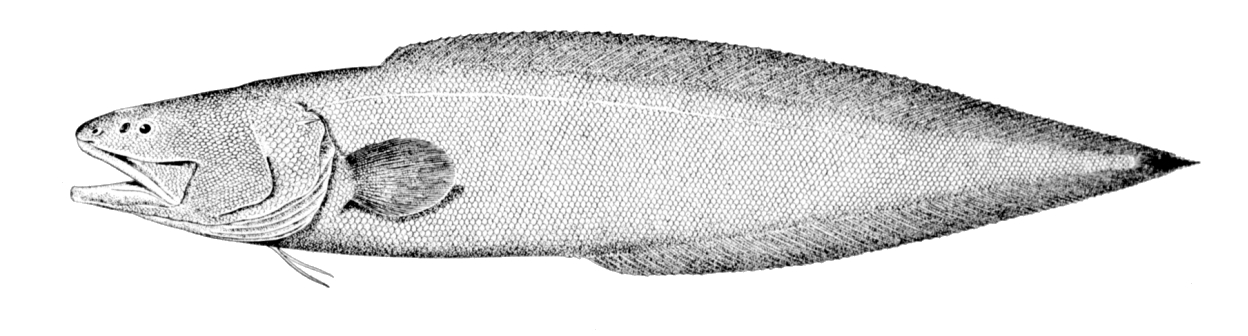
- Bassogigas gillii

Scientific classification
- Kingdom: Animalia
- Phylum: Chordata
- Class: Actinopterygii
- Order: Ophidiiformes
- Family: Ophidiidae
- Subfamily: Neobythitinae
- Genus: Bassogigas; Goode & Bean, 1896

Type species
- Bassogigas gillii Goode & Bean, 1896

= Bassogigas =

Genus of fishes

Bassogigas is a genus of cusk eel from the subfamily Neobythitinae, part of the family Ophidiidae. The generic name "Bassogigas" comes from a combination of two Latin words: bassus, which means "deep" and gigas which means "giant". The species are found in the Indo-Pacific and western Atlantic Ocean.

== Species ==
The following two species are contained within the genus Bassogigas:

- Bassogigas gillii Goode & Bean, 1896
- Bassogigas walkeri Nielsen & Møller, 2011 – (Walker's cusk eel)
