= Three Kings Ridge =

Deep sea plateau, north of New Zealand

- Stratigraphic range: Oligocene-Miocene 37.5–20 Ma
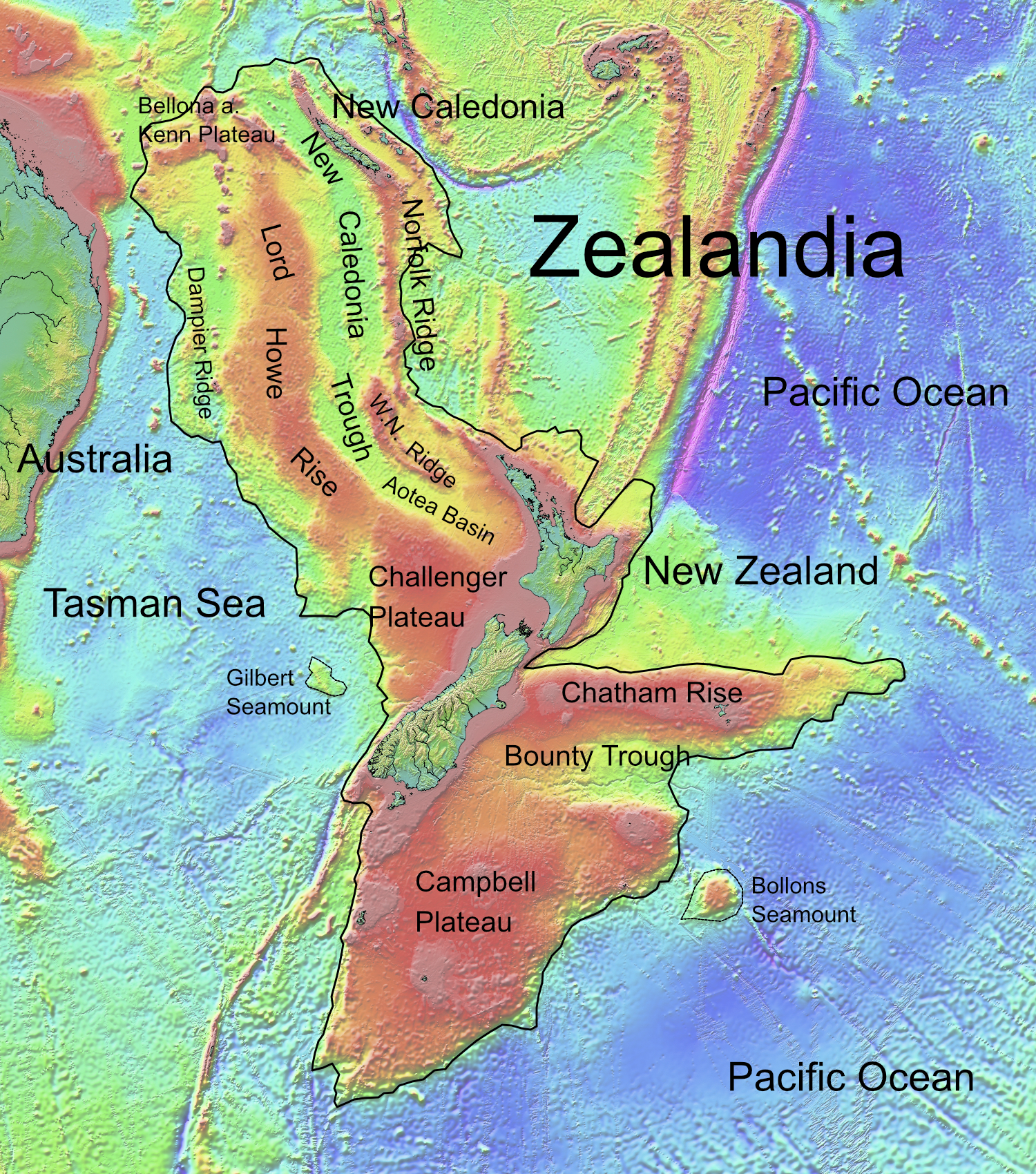
- The Three Kings Ridge (unlabelled) extends northward from the northern tip of the North Island of New Zealand in this map of Zealandia
- Type: Igneous

Lithology
- Primary: Basalt, mantle peridotite, trachybasalt through to rarer andesite

Location
- Coordinates: 31.05°S 172.85°E
- Region: South Pacific
- Country: New Zealand

Type section
- Named for: Three Kings Islands

The Three Kings Ridge, sometimes known as Three Kings Rise and more rarely at its southern end as the Three Kings Bank is a deep sea westward facing volcanic arc of Zealandia continental crust extending from 55 kilometres (34 mi) northwest of Cape Reinga / Te Rerenga Wairua, New Zealand on a line bisecting New Caledonia and Fiji in the South Pacific Ocean. Its southern portion contains the Manawatāwhi / Three Kings Islands which have biological significance as they are host to unique species and important marine ecosystems.

== Geology ==
The ridge along with its northern continuation, the Loyalty Ridge that extends north of New Caledonia, is now a relatively well studied, greater than 3,000 km (1,900 mi) long feature of Zealandia tectonics. It is a relatively rigid portion of continental crust compared to the oceanic crust in surrounding basins about 25 km (16 mi) in thickness. While regarded as inactive there have been moderate sized earthquakes at the northern end of the ridge. It can be regarded as a stranded western remnant arc segment split off by intra-arc and cross-arc rifting during back-arc basin opening from the still active eastern arc segments close to the Pacific trench and slab. The 400 km (250 mi) long Cook Fracture Zone that is aligned with the two ridges separates it from the Loyalty Ridge and is associated with about 250 km (160 mi) lateral displacement at the southern end of the central Minerva-Cook spreading zone of the South Fiji Basin. In the middle of the area between the two ridges is the youngest dated volcanics, being the DR22A seamount at 19.7 ± 0.5 Ma. The northern deep tip of the ridge has mudstone at 3,700 m (12,100 ft) water depth that is stratigraphically dated to 20.9 to 18.7 Ma. To its east is the Norfolk basin separating it from the Norfolk Ridge in the Tasman Sea. To its west is the South Fiji Basin with its former spreading sea floor of the Cook Fracture Zone. To its south a trough extends from the Norfolk Basin separating it from the volcanic alignment of the Norfolk Ridge with the northern North Island. It has been postulated that the Three Kings Ridge has been subsequently separated by the now inactive Vening Meinesz Fault Zone from the Miocene volcanic arcs of Northland in the North Island, and its extension under the Tasman Sea of the Northland Plateau. However, there is a distinct age difference between the 25 million years ago dates of the southern part of the ridge eruptives and the nearest North Island volcanics.

The seabed on the rise has a component from a large drowned Oligocene island of metamorphic rocks, mantle peridotite, and Gondwana derived continental rocks dating from 38 million years ago (the oldest basement is dated 37.5 Ma). These 39–36 million year old Eocene lavas are now known to be subordinate to later activity and are mainly confined to the western side of the ridge. However a 32 million year old andesitic centre has been characterised at the northeastern area of the ridge. There was a pulse of voluminous late Oligocene to early Miocene (25 to 22 million years ago) volcanic activity within the Cook Fracture Zone and the northern portions of the ridge that now dominate. The ridge surface is mainly trachybasalt and basaltic andesite, with some trachyandesite, and andesite, but no rhyolite volcanics. Its sides are basalt suggesting these are basement as they are also found in the nearly basins. Sporadic volcanic activity after this is evidenced by say samples of andesite from 20 million years ago. The ridge has been mainly below sealevel since 21 million years ago due to Australian and Pacific Plate extension but the present islands to the ridges south were still connected to each other, but not New Zealand, at the sea level minimum of 7000 years ago.

=== Tectonic implications ===
It has been postulated that the relatively rigid Three Kings Ridge had a role in the emplacement of the Northland Allochthon and this may contain rocks inherited from a Three Kings arc collision. This collision as the continental crust of the ridge moved southeast about 25.5–22 million years ago would have been had to have been associated with a subduction flip in the postulated model.

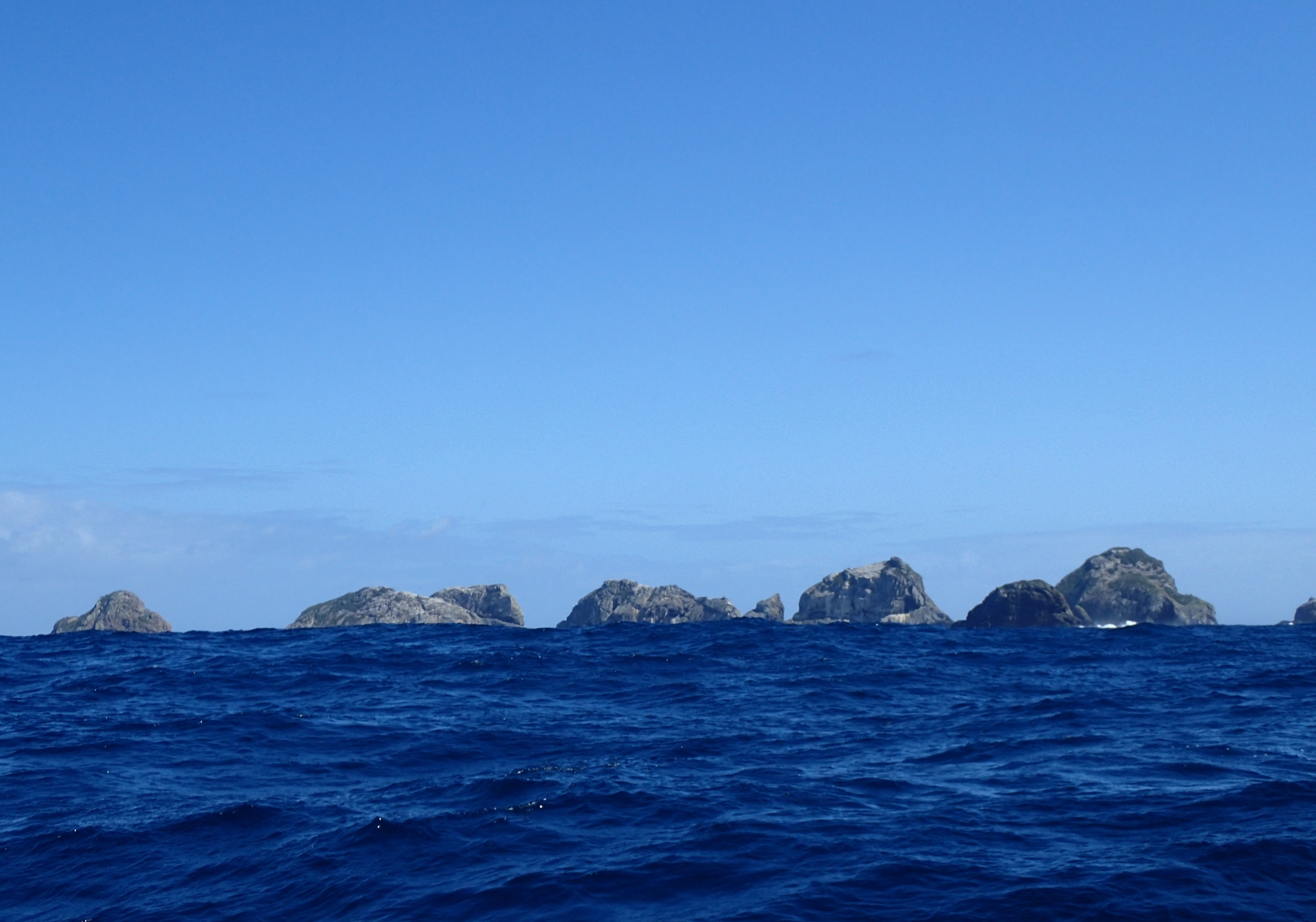
The Princes Islands in the Tasman Sea are the southeastern manifestation of the Three Kings Ridge.

== Islands, reefs and seamounts ==
The ridge has to its south a group of 13 presently uninhabited islands where the South Pacific Ocean and Tasman Sea meet. These are separated from the New Zealand North Island by a 8 km (5.0 mi) wide submarine trough that is at least 200 m (660 ft) deep and may be associated with the Vening Meinesz Fault Zone.

=== Bio-genetic separation ===
There is genetic drift evidence in insect and snail populations that these islands have been connected together but separate from the North Island from the point of view of individual species for up to 24 million years, but as recently as 2.24 million years with others. In the case of the islands flax snail Placostylus bollonsi Suter, they are more strongly related to a New Caledonia species, that any New Zealand species.

== See also ==
- Lord Howe Rise – Deep sea plateau, west of New Zealand
- Chatham Rise – Area of ocean floor to the east of New Zealand
- Norfolk Ridge – Submarine ridge between New Caledonia and New Zealand
- South Tasman Rise – Area of seafloor about 1500 m deep south of Hobart, Tasmania in the Southern Ocean
