= Bloody Bluff fault =

The Bloody Bluff fault is the boundary between the Milford-Dedham zone and the Nashoba zone in eastern Massachusetts. It runs between Westborough, Massachusetts and Lynnfield, Massachusetts. In the south, into Connecticut, the component Lake Char fault is poorly exposed. The Bloody Bluff fault zone is 3.2 kilometers wide in Framingham, Massachusetts and forms the five kilometer wide Burlington mylonite zone to the north. Rocks along the fault have experienced both ductile and brittle deformation.

There is relatively little mylonite in the vicinity of Westborough. The fault is visible along I-495 just east of Westborough and further east, the Bloody Bluff-Lake Char fault splits into smaller branches. One of these faults, tentatively named the Weston fault, may extend into the Boston Basin. Where the Bloody Bluff fault ends in the northeast, at the terminus of the Burlington mylonite zone, it may intersect the proposed Mystic fault.
