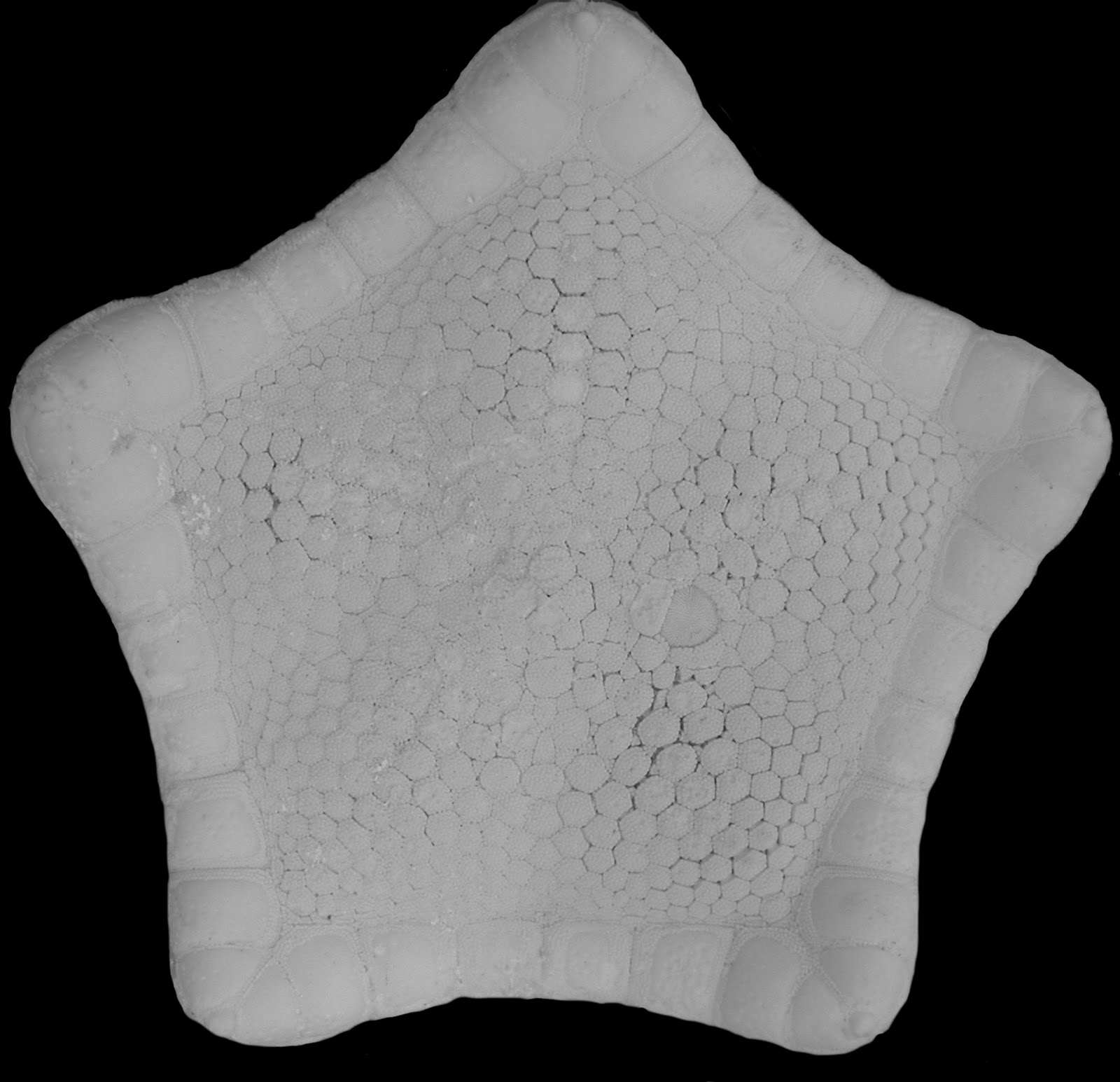
- Sphaeriodiscus mirabilis

Scientific classification
- Kingdom: Animalia
- Phylum: Echinodermata
- Class: Asteroidea
- Order: Valvatida
- Family: Goniasteridae
- Genus: Sphaeriodiscus; Fisher, 1910

= Sphaeriodiscus =

Genus of starfishes

Sphaeriodiscus is a genus of echinoderms belonging to the family Goniasteridae.

The genus has almost cosmopolitan distribution.

Species:

- Sphaeriodiscus ammophilus (Fisher, 1906)
- Sphaeriodiscus biomaglo Mah, 2018
- Sphaeriodiscus bourgeti (Perrier, 1885)
- Sphaeriodiscus ganae Mah, 2018
- Sphaeriodiscus inaequalis (Gray, 1847)
- Sphaeriodiscus irritatus H.E.S.Clark, 2001
- Sphaeriodiscus maui McKnight, 1973
- Sphaeriodiscus mirabilis A.M.Clark, 1976
- Sphaeriodiscus scotocryptus Fisher, 1913
