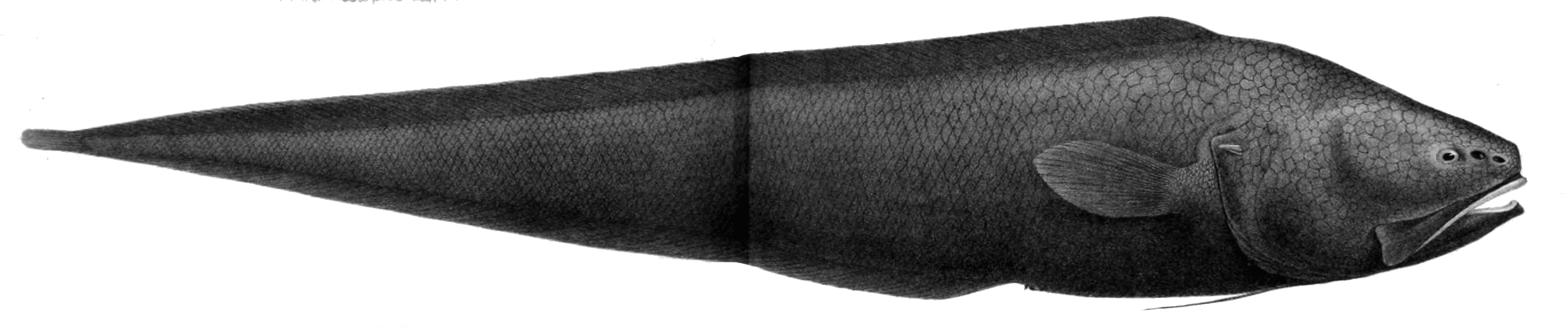
- Bassozetus compressus
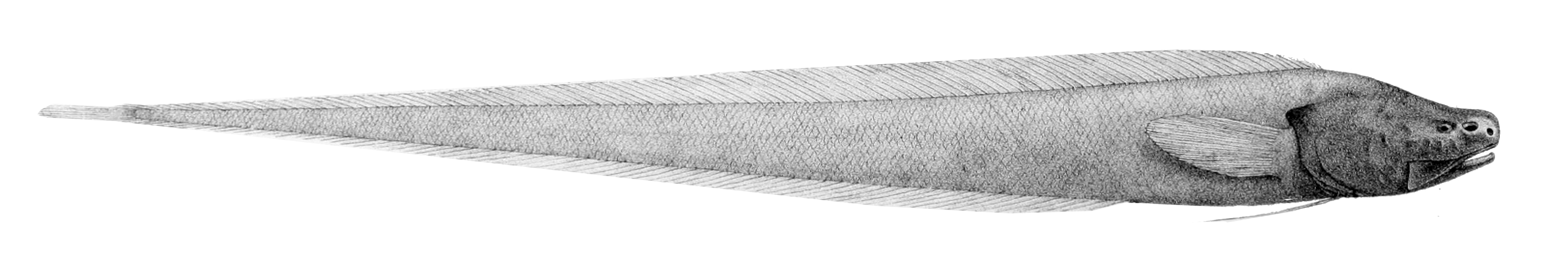
- Bassozetus taenia

Scientific classification
- Kingdom: Animalia
- Phylum: Chordata
- Class: Actinopterygii
- Order: Ophidiiformes
- Family: Ophidiidae
- Subfamily: Neobythitinae
- Genus: Bassozetus; Gill, 1883

Type species
- Bassozetus normalis Gill, 1883

= Bassozetus =

Genus of fishes

Bassozetus is a genus of cusk-eels found in the Atlantic, Indian and Pacific Oceans.

== Species ==
There are currently 16 recognized species in this genus:

- Bassozetus compressus (Günther, 1878) (Abyssal assfish)
- Bassozetus galatheae J. G. Nielsen & Merrett, 2000 (Galathea assfish)
- Bassozetus glutinosus (Alcock, 1890) (Glutin assfish)
- Bassozetus levistomatus Machida, 1989
- Bassozetus mozambiquensis Tomiyama, Takami & A. Fukui, 2016 (Mozambique assfish)
- Bassozetus multispinis Shcherbachev, 1980
- Bassozetus nasus Garman, 1899
- Bassozetus nielseni Tomiyama, Takami & Fukui, 2018 (Masked assfish)
- Bassozetus normalis Gill, 1883
- Bassozetus oncerocephalus (Vaillant, 1888)
- Bassozetus robustus H. M. Smith & Radcliffe, 1913 (Robust assfish)
- Bassozetus squamosus Tomiyama, Takami & Fukui, 2021
- Bassozetus taenia (Günther, 1887)
- Bassozetus trachibranchus Tomiyama, Takami & Fukui, 2021
- Bassozetus werneri J. G. Nielsen & Merrett, 2000
- Bassozetus zenkevitchi Rass (ru), 1955
