= Bellingham Basin =

The small Bellingham Basin, is a structural feature in eastern Massachusetts, which formed within older Proterozoic rock and contains metasedimentary and metavolcanic rocks dating the Pennsylvanian, deposited between 323 and 298 million years ago. The basin is bounded by extensions of the Mount Hope fault and a fault extending from the Boston Basin.

The rocks in the basin metamorphosed to greenschist facies on the sequence of metamorphic facies and contain flattened pebbles.
