= Norfolk Basin (Massachusetts) =

Sedimentary basin in North America

Coordinates: 42°05′00″N 71°18′00″W

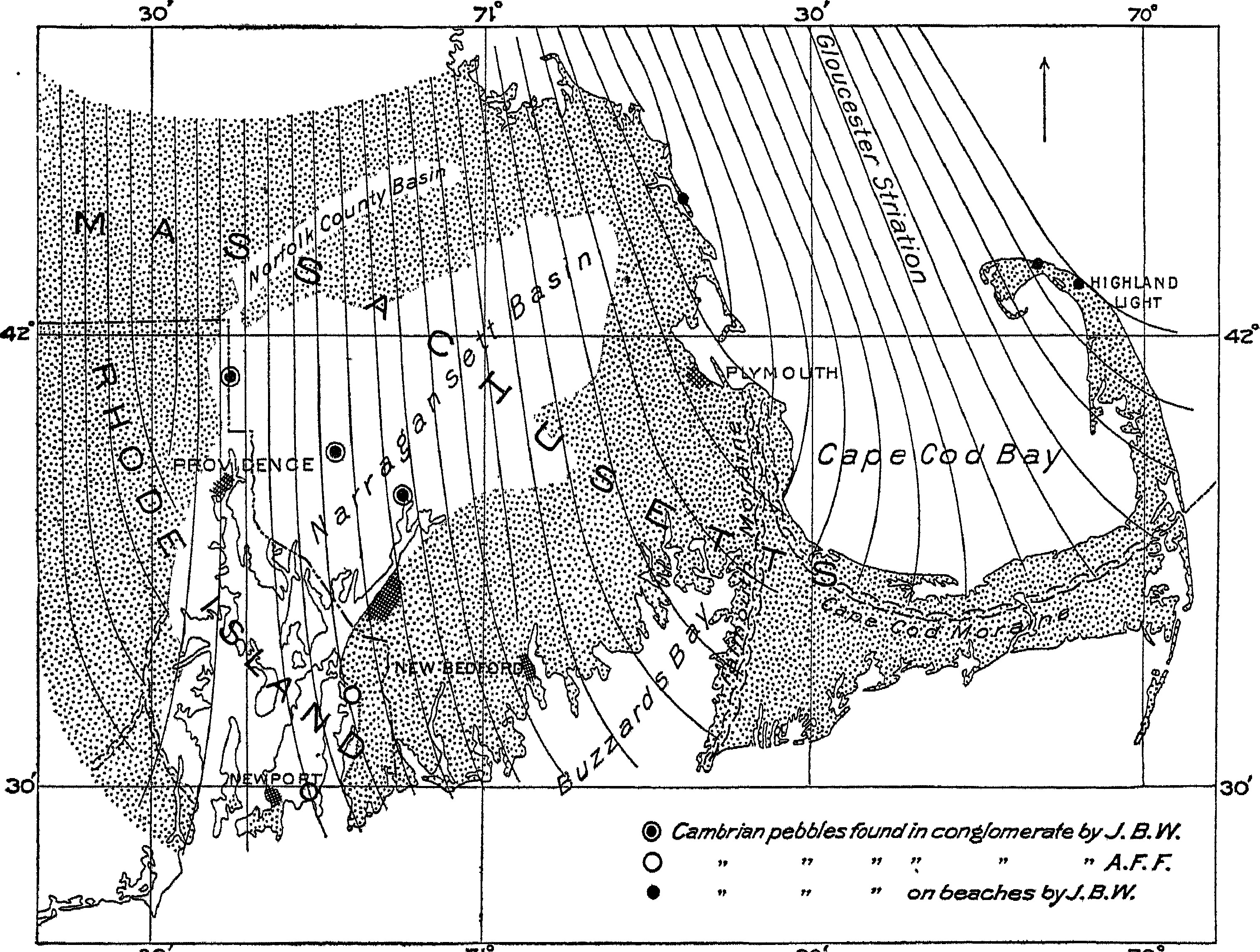
Historic geological map of Massachusetts that shows Norfolk Basin as Norfolk County Basin

The Norfolk Basin is synclinal basin, partially bounded by faults, running east-northeast between the Dedham Block and the Foxborough Block. It contains the folded and cleaved, but unmetamorphosed Wamsutta Formation and Pondville Conglomerate, which both formed in the Pennsylvanian, also known as the Late Carboniferous 323 to 298 million years ago. The middle of the basin is close to the village of Pondville.

The basin is separated from the Proterozoic Dedham Granite of the southeastern Massachusetts batholith by the Ponkapoag Fault. Further east, the Ponkapoag Fault cuts out the Pennsylvanian sedimentary rocks, so that the Ordovician-Silurian Quincy Granite and the Cambrian Braintree Formation directly contact the Dedham Granite. The Ponkapoag Fault, near Weymouth, also splits up the Wamsutta Formation between the Norfolk Basin and the nearby Narragansett Basin.

== Northern Norfolk Basin ==
An unconformity separates the basin from the Blue Hills in the northeast where it tapers out. The Pondville Conglomerate, lying atop the Blue Hill Granite Porphyry dips 60 degrees south.

== Southern Norfolk Basin ==
Felsic volcanic rock flanks the basin in the southwest and it is fragmented by numerous small faults. The Sharon Syenite, exposed just south of Franklin on I-495 indicates this, with a high-degree of fracturing. In fact, an inlier of Dedham Granite splits the formation in two in the southwest.
