= Burlington mylonite zone =

The Burlington mylonite zone is a 1.5 kilometer thick mylonite zone, resulting from the dynamic recrystallization and grain size reduction of rocks, running from Weston, Massachusetts to Lynnfield, Massachusetts and Danvers, Massachusetts. The deformation that formed the zone is believed to be related to the Bloody Bluff Fault. In 1976, R. O. Castle released information indicating that the Paleozoic Early Devonian Peabody Granite intruded the mylonite zone, giving a young age limit for the formation.

The rocks within the Burlington mylonite zone are mainly fine-grained, laminated mylonites ranging to gneiss, with augen eye-shaped mineral grains. The zone also includes smaller includes of quartz schist and chlorite schist and layered non-mylonite mafic rocks.
