= Dicrolene tristis =

Scientific classification
- Kingdom: Animalia
- Phylum: Chordata
- Class: Actinopterygii
- Order: Ophidiiformes
- Family: Ophidiidae
- Subfamily: Neobythitinae
- Genus: Dicrolene
- Species: D. tristis

Binomial name
- Dicrolene tristis Smith & Radcliffe, 1913

Species of fish

Dicrolene tristis is a ray-finned fish species from the family of cusk eels from the western Pacific, from Japan south to the Philippines. It is a marine, bathydemersal species with a depth range 560–990 metres (1,840–3,250 ft). It os oviparous laying its eggs in a gelatinous floating mass.
