= IUCN Red List vulnerable species (Animalia) =

Animals classified as vulnerable by the IUCN

In August 2018, the IUCN Red List of Threatened Species identified 6086 Vulnerable species, subspecies and varieties, stocks and sub-populations in the Animalia kingdom.

== Annelida ==
=== Clitellata ===
==== Megadrilaceae ====
===== Megascolecidae =====
- Anisochaeta animae
- Diporochaeta chathamensis
- Driloleirus americanus

===== Moniligastridae =====
- Drawida ofunatoensis

==== Opisthopora ====
===== Acanthodrilidae =====
- Acanthodrilus kermadecensis
- Decachaetus erici
- Decachaetus minor
- Diplotrema bilboi

== Arthropoda ==
=== Arachnida ===
==== Amblypygi ====
===== Charinoidea =====
- Charinus seychellarum

===== Phrynoidea =====
- Phrynichus scaber

==== Araneae ====
===== Gnaphosidae =====
- Xerophaeus espoir

===== Linyphiidae =====
- Troglohyphantes gracilis
- Troglohyphantes similis
- Troglohyphantes spinipes

===== Lycosidae =====
- Pardosa diuturna
- Sosippus placidus

===== Nephilidae =====
- Clitaetra episinoides
- Herennia gagamba

===== Ochyroceratidae =====
- Ouette ouette
- Roche roche

===== Oonopidae =====
- Brignolia trichinalis
- Cousinea keeleyi
- Silhouettella curieusei

===== Pholcidae =====
- Cenemus culiculus

===== Pisauridae =====
- Dolomedes plantarius

===== Salticidae =====
- Baviola braueri
- Baviola vanmoli
- Carrhotus bellus
- Goleba pallens
- Hasarius rufociliatus
- Paraheliophanus jeanae
- Paraheliophanus sanctaehelenae
- Paraheliophanus subinstructus
- Sadies fulgida
- Sadies seychellensis

===== Scytodidae =====
- Soeuria soeur

===== Tetragnathidae =====
- Mesida thorelli
- Meta dolloff

===== Theraphosidae =====
- Grammostola vachoni
- Nesiergus insulanus
- Poecilotheria striata
- Thrigmopoeus insignis

===== Theridiidae =====
- Argyrodella pusillus
- Argyrodes cognatus
- Argyrodes fissifrontellus
- Phycosoma spundana
- Rhomphaea barycephala
- Stoda libudum

===== Theridiosomatidae =====
- Andasta benoiti

==== Opiliones ====
===== Phalangodidae =====
- Banksula melones

===== Podoctidae =====
- Ibalonius flavopictus

==== Pseudoscorpiones ====
===== Neobisiidae =====
- Fissilicreagris imperialis

===== Olpiidae =====
- Beierolpium benoiti
- Xenolpium insulare

===== Withiidae =====
- Nesowithius seychellesensis

==== Schizomida ====
===== Hubbardiidae =====
- Bamazomus aviculus

==== Scorpiones ====
===== Liochelidae =====
- Chiromachus ochropus

=== Branchiopoda ===
==== Anostraca ====
===== Branchinectidae =====
- Branchinecta lynchi

===== Chirocephalidae =====
- Chirocephalus croaticus
- Chirocephalus pelagonicus
- Chirocephalus reiseri

===== Parartemiidae =====
- Parartemia contracta

===== Thamnocephalidae =====
- Branchinella apophysata
- Branchinella basispina
- Branchinella denticulata
- Branchinella simplex
- Branchinella wellardi

==== Diplostraca ====
===== Chydoridae =====
- Alona hercegovinae
- Alona sketi
- Alona smirnovi
- Rhynchochydorus australiensis

===== Daphniidae =====
- Daphnia coronata
- Daphnia jollyi
- Daphnia nivalis
- Daphnia occidentalis

===== Leptestheriidae =====
- Eoleptestheria spinosa

===== Limnadiidae =====
- Imnadia banatica
- Imnadia cristata
- Imnadia panonica

=== Chilopoda ===
==== Scolopendromorpha ====
===== Scolopendridae =====
- Scolopendra abnormis

=== Diplopoda ===
==== Polydesmida ====
===== Haplodesmidae =====
- Eutrichodesmus griseus

===== Pyrgodesmidae =====
- Hyperothrix orophura

==== Polyzoniida ====
===== Siphonotidae =====
- Rhinotus crassiceps

==== Siphonophorida ====
===== Siphonophoridae =====
- Pterozonium braueri

==== Sphaerotheriida ====
===== Arthrosphaeridae =====
- Zoosphaerium pseudopriapus
- Zoosphaerium trichordum
- Zoosphaerium voeltzkowianum

==== Spirobolida ====
===== Pachybolidae =====
- Spiromimus dorsovittatus
- Spiromimus namoroka
- Spiromimus voeltzkowi

==== Spirostreptida ====
===== Cambalopsidae =====
- Plusioglyphiulus boutini

===== Spirostreptidae =====
- Doratogonus avius
- Doratogonus barbatus
- Doratogonus herberti
- Doratogonus hoffmani
- Doratogonus meridionalis
- Doratogonus natalensis
- Doratogonus precarius

=== Entognatha ===
==== Collembola ====
===== Entomobryidae =====
- Acrocyrtus sp. nov. 'HC - blind'

===== Isotomidae =====
- Folsomides sp. nov. 'HC - blind'

=== Insecta ===
==== Archaeognatha ====
===== Machilidae =====
- Parapetrobius azoricus

==== Coleoptera ====
===== Anthribidae =====
- Homoeodera pygmaea
- Valenfriesia alutacea
- Valenfriesia dimidiata

===== Carabidae =====
- Carabus olympiae
- Clinidium canaliculatum
- Trechus isabelae
- Trechus terceiranus

===== Cerambycidae =====
- Anaglyptus zappii
- Anisarthron barbipes
- Callidium cedri
- Cerambyx cerdo
- Clytus clavicornis
- Clytus triangulimacula
- Delagrangeus schurmanni
- Grammoptera viridipennis
- Isotomus barbarae
- Macrodontia cervicornis
- Morimus funereus
- Neopiciella sicula
- Pedostrangalia ariadne
- Pedostrangalia revestita
- Rosalia alpina

===== Cetoniidae =====
- Chromovalgus peyroni
- Protaetia sardea

===== Cicindelidae =====
- Cicindela marginipennis

===== Cleridae =====
- Enoplium doderoi
- Thanasimodes dorsalis

===== Curculionidae =====
- Anonyxmolytes lilliput

===== Dytiscidae =====
- Acilius duvergeri
- Deronectes depressicollis
- Deronectes ferrugineus
- Dytiscus latissimus
- Graphoderus bilineatus
- Meladema lanio

===== Elateridae =====
- Ampedus brunnicornis
- Ampedus corsicus
- Ampedus hjorti

===== Elmidae =====
- Stenelmis gammoni

===== Eucnemidae =====
- Melasis fermini

===== Geotrupidae =====
- Thorectes valencianus

===== Leiodidae =====
- Glacicavicola bathyscioides

===== Lucanidae =====
- Colophon cameroni
- Colophon neli
- Colophon stokoei
- Colophon westwoodi
- Dorcus musimon
- Lucanus busignyi

===== Mycetophagidae =====
- Esarcus baudii
- Esarcus fiorii
- Esarcus franzi

===== Scarabaeidae =====
- Aegialia concinna
- Aegialia crescenta
- Ateuchetus semipunctatus
- Ateuchus squalidus
- Aulacopris matthewsi
- Canthon corpulentus
- Canthon quadripunctatus
- Canthon zuninoi
- Clypeodrepanus striatus
- Ontherus hadros
- Onthophagus albarracinus
- Onthophagus undulans
- Pachysoma aesculapius
- Pachysoma endroedyi
- Pachysoma glentoni
- Pedaridium hirsutum
- Platyonitis bicuariensis
- Pseudocotalpa giulianii

===== Tenebrionidae =====
- Alphitophagus carteianus
- Alphitophagus xaxarsi
- Coelometopus cobosi
- Coelus globosus
- Coelus gracilis
- Microblattellus lecongmani
- Mycetochara roubali
- Polposipus herculeanus

===== Tetratomidae =====
- Tetratoma tedaldi

===== Trogossitidae =====
- Leipaspis lauricola

===== Zopheridae =====
- Nosodomodes syriacus
- Tarphius oulmesensis

==== Diptera ====
===== Blephariceridae =====
- Edwardsina tasmaniensis

===== Drosophilidae =====
- Scaptomyza horaeoptera

===== Tabanidae =====
- Brennania belkini

==== Grylloblattodea ====
===== Grylloblattidae =====
- Grylloblatta chirurgica
- Namkungia magnus

==== Hemiptera ====
===== Cixiidae =====
- Cixius azopifajo
- Cixius azoterceirae

==== Hymenoptera ====
===== Apidae =====
- Bombus alpinus
- Bombus caliginosus
- Bombus fervidus
- Bombus medius
- Bombus mexicanus
- Bombus morrisoni
- Bombus occidentalis
- Bombus pensylvanicus
- Bombus terricola
- Nomada noskiewiczi

===== Colletidae =====
- Colletes dimidiatus
- Colletes moricei
- Colletes pulchellus

===== Formicidae =====
- Acanthomyops latipes
- Acanthomyops murphii
- Anergates atratulus
- Anoplolepis nuptialis
- Antichthonidris bidentatus
- Camponotus universitatis
- Cardiocondyla zoserka
- Cataglyphis hannae
- Chalepoxenus brunneus
- Chalepoxenus kutteri
- Chalepoxenus muellerianus
- Chalepoxenus spinosus
- Chalepoxenus tarbinskii
- Chalepoxenus tauricus
- Chalepoxenus tramieri
- Chalepoxenus zabelini
- Crematogaster atilanica
- Crematogaster pilosa
- Doronomyrmex goesswaldi
- Doronomyrmex kutteri
- Doronomyrmex pacis
- Doronomyrmex pocahontas
- Dorymyrmex insanus
- Epimyrma adlerzi
- Epimyrma africana
- Epimyrma algeriana
- Epimyrma bernardi
- Epimyrma corsica
- Epimyrma goridaghini
- Epimyrma kraussei
- Epimyrma ravouxi
- Epimyrma stumperi
- Epimyrma tamarae
- Epimyrma zaleskyi
- Formica dirksi
- Formica talbotae
- Formicoxenus chamberlini
- Formicoxenus nitidulus
- Formicoxenus provancheri
- Formicoxenus quebecensis
- Formicoxenus sibiricus
- Harpagoxenus canadensis
- Harpagoxenus sublaevis
- Harpagoxenus zaisanicus
- Kyidris media
- Kyidris yaleogyna
- Lasius reginae
- Leptothorax buschingeri
- Leptothorax duloticus
- Leptothorax faberi
- Leptothorax minutissimus
- Manica parasitica
- Megalomyrmex symmetochus
- Monomorium effractor
- Monomorium hospitum
- Monomorium inquilinum
- Monomorium noualhieri
- Monomorium pergandei
- Monomorium santschii
- Monomorium talbotae
- Myrmecia inquilina
- Myrmica bibikoffi
- Myrmica colax
- Myrmica ereptrix
- Myrmica faniensis
- Myrmica hirsuta
- Myrmica kabylica
- Myrmica lampra
- Myrmica laurae
- Myrmica lemasnei
- Myrmica myrmicoxena
- Myrmica quebecensis
- Myrmica samnitica
- Myrmica symbiotica
- Myrmica winterae
- Myrmoxenus gordiagini
- Oxyepoecus bruchi
- Oxyepoecus daguerrei
- Oxyepoecus inquilinus
- Pheidole acutidens
- Pheidole argentina
- Pheidole elecebra
- Pheidole inquilina
- Pheidole lanuginosa
- Pheidole microgyna
- Pheidole neokohli
- Pheidole oculata
- Pheidole parasitica
- Pheidole symbiotica
- Plagiolepis ampeloni
- Plagiolepis grassei
- Plagiolepis regis
- Pogonomyrmex anergismus
- Pogonomyrmex colei
- Polyergus breviceps
- Polyergus lucidus
- Polyergus nigerrimus
- Polyergus samurai
- Protomognathus americanus
- Pseudoatta argentina
- Pseudomyrmex leptosus
- Rhoptromyrmex mayri
- Rhoptromyrmex schmitzi
- Rossomyrmex minuchae
- Rossomyrmex proformicarum
- Serrastruma inquilina
- Solenopsis daguerrei
- Solenopsis solenopsidis
- Strongylognathus afer
- Strongylognathus alboini
- Strongylognathus alpinus
- Strongylognathus arnoldii
- Strongylognathus caeciliae
- Strongylognathus cecconii
- Strongylognathus chelifer
- Strongylognathus christophi
- Strongylognathus dalmaticus
- Strongylognathus destefanii
- Strongylognathus emeryi
- Strongylognathus foreli
- Strongylognathus huberi
- Strongylognathus insularis
- Strongylognathus italicus
- Strongylognathus karawajevi
- Strongylognathus kervillei
- Strongylognathus koreanus
- Strongylognathus kratochvilli
- Strongylognathus minutus
- Strongylognathus palaestinensis
- Strongylognathus pisarskii
- Strongylognathus rehbinderi
- Strongylognathus ruzskyi
- Strongylognathus silvestrii
- Strumigenys xenos
- Teleutomyrmex kutteri
- Teleutomyrmex schneideri
- Tetramorium microgyna
- Tetramorium parasiticum

===== Megachilidae =====
- Megachile pluto

===== Melittidae =====
- Melitta hispanica
- Melitta kastiliensis

==== Lepidoptera ====
===== Crambidae =====
- Eudonia melanographa
- Scoparia carvalhoi

===== Hesperiidae =====
- Hesperia dacotae
- Pyrgus cirsii

===== Lasiocampidae =====
- Phyllodesma ilicifolia

===== Lycaenidae =====
- Alaena margaritacea
- Aloeides caledoni
- Aloeides carolynnae
- Aloeides dentatis
- Aloeides kaplani
- Aloeides lutescens
- Aloeides merces
- Aloeides pringlei
- Aloeides rossouwi
- Aslauga australis
- Capys penningtoni
- Cyanophrys bertha
- Erikssonia acraeina
- Iolaus lulua
- Lepidochrysops balli
- Lepidochrysops jefferyi
- Lepidochrysops littoralis
- Lepidochrysops loewensteini
- Lepidochrysops oosthuizeni
- Lepidochrysops outeniqua
- Lepidochrysops pephredo
- Lepidochrysops poseidon
- Lepidochrysops pringlei
- Lepidochrysops swanepoeli
- Lepidochrysops titei
- Lepidochrysops victori
- Lepidochrysops wykehami
- Liptena tiassale
- Lycaena hermes
- Lycaena ottomana
- Orachrysops ariadne
- Phasis pringlei
- Poecilmitis adonis
- Poecilmitis azurius
- Poecilmitis balli
- Poecilmitis daphne
- Poecilmitis endymion
- Poecilmitis henningi
- Poecilmitis hyperion
- Poecilmitis irene
- Poecilmitis kaplani
- Poecilmitis lyncurium
- Poecilmitis lyndseyae
- Poecilmitis orientalis
- Poecilmitis penningtoni
- Poecilmitis pyramus
- Poecilmitis stepheni
- Poecilmitis trimeni
- Poecilmitis wykehami
- Polyommatus galloi
- Polyommatus golgus
- Polyommatus iphicarmon
- Polyommatus lycius
- Polyommatus orphicus
- Satyrium jebelia
- Strymon avalona
- Thestor compassbergae
- Thestor dryburghi
- Thestor kaplani
- Thestor pringlei
- Thestor rossouwi
- Thestor stepheni
- Thestor strutti
- Thestor swanepoeli
- Thestor tempe
- Thestor yildizae

===== Noctuidae =====
- Phlogophora furnasi

===== Nymphalidae =====
- Amauris nossima
- Amauris phoedon
- Boloria acrocnema
- Coenonympha orientalis
- Erebia christi
- Erebia sudetica
- Euploea andamanensis
- Euploea cordelia
- Euploea euphon
- Euploea lacon
- Euploea magou
- Euploea scherzeri
- Hipparchia bacchus
- Hipparchia tilosi
- Idea electra
- Idea tambusisiana
- Ideopsis oberthurii
- Parantica clinias
- Parantica dabrerai
- Parantica dannatti
- Parantica garamantis
- Parantica philo
- Parantica phyle
- Parantica toxopei
- Parantica wegneri
- Pseudochazara orestes
- Tirumala euploeomorpha

===== Papilionidae =====
- Atrophaneura atropos
- Atrophaneura luchti
- Atrophaneura schadenbergi
- Battus zetides
- Bhutanitis ludlowi
- Eurytides iphitas
- Graphium epaminondas
- Graphium idaeoides
- Graphium meeki
- Graphium megaera
- Graphium procles
- Graphium stresemanni
- Ornithoptera aesacus
- Papilio carolinensis
- Papilio esperanza
- Papilio jordani
- Papilio leucotaenia
- Papilio mangoura
- Papilio neumoegeni
- Papilio osmana
- Papilio phorbanta
- Parides ascanius
- Parnassius apollo
- Parnassius autocrator
- Protographium marcellinus
- Troides andromache
- Troides dohertyi
- Troides prattorum
- Zerynthia caucasica

===== Pieridae =====
- Gonepteryx cleobule
- Mylothris atewa
- Pieris segonzaci

===== Stathmopodidae =====
- Neomariania oecophorella

==== Mantodea ====
===== Mantidae =====
- Ameles gracilis
- Ameles limbata
- Pseudoyersinia subaptera

==== Odonata ====
===== Aeshnidae =====
- Gynacantha bispina
- Gynacantha constricta
- Petaliaeschna flavipes
- Pinheyschna waterstoni
- Pinheyschna yemenensis
- Planaeschna celia
- Sarasaeschna niisatoi

===== Argiolestidae =====
- Austroargiolestes elke
- Griseargiolestes bucki
- Luzonargiolestes realensis

===== Austropetaliidae =====
- Phyllopetalia excrescens

===== Calopterygidae =====
- Hetaerina rudis
- Umma declivium
- Umma femina

===== Chlorocyphidae =====
- Chlorocypha flammea
- Chlorocypha neptunus
- Libellago andamanensis
- Rhinocypha dorsosanguinea
- Rhinocypha latimacula

===== Chlorogomphidae =====
- Chlorogomphus brevistigma
- Chlorogomphus gracilis
- Chlorogomphus nakamurai
- Chlorogomphus xanthoptera
- Chloropetalia selysi
- Watanabeopetalia uenoi

===== Coenagrionidae =====
- Africallagma quingentum
- Agriocnemis kunjina
- Agriocnemis palaeforma
- Antiagrion blanchardi
- Austroagrion pindrina
- Caliagrion billinghursti
- Ceriagrion georgifreyi
- Coenagrion intermedium
- Coryphagrion grandis
- Enallagma truncatum
- Ischnura pamelae
- Leptobasis melinogaster
- Mecistogaster asticta
- Megalagrion oahuense
- Megalagrion oceanicum
- Megalagrion pacificum
- Megalagrion xanthomelas
- Mesamphiagrion ovigerum
- Mesamphiagrion rosseri
- Pericnemis triangularis
- Pseudagrion bicoerulans
- Pseudagrion guichardi
- Pseudagrion kaffinum
- Pseudagrion newtoni
- Pseudagrion pontogenes
- Pseudagrion symoensii
- Telebasis farcimentum

===== Corduliidae =====
- Metaphya elongata
- Somatochlora borisi

===== Euphaeidae =====
- Bayadera hyalina
- Euphaea basalis
- Euphaea pahyapi

===== Gomphidae =====
- Armagomphus armiger
- Crenigomphus abyssinicus
- Crenigomphus denticulatus
- Cyclogomphus gynostylus
- Gomphus lucasii
- Hemigomphus magela
- Lamelligomphus tutulus
- Macrogomphus lankanensis
- Nepogomphoides stuhlmanni
- Onychogomphus assimilis
- Onychogomphus flexuosus
- Onychogomphus macrodon
- Paragomphus tachyerges
- Perigomphus pallidistylus
- Phanogomphus sandrius
- Phyllogomphoides joaquini
- Stylurus potulentus

===== Heteragrionidae =====
- Heteragrion flavovittatum

===== Hypolestidae =====
- Hypolestes trinitatis

===== Isostictidae =====
- Lithosticta macra

===== Lestidae =====
- Indolestes obiri

===== Lestoideidae =====
- Lestoidea barbarae

===== Libellulidae =====
- Atoconeura aethiopica
- Bironides teuchestes
- Brachythemis fuscopalliata
- Diplacina arsinoe
- Huonia melvillensis
- Libellula jesseana
- Micrathyria divergens
- Micrathyria pseudhypodidyma
- Neodythemis nyungwe
- Orthetrum poecilops
- Sympetrum gracile
- Urothemis abbotti

===== Macromiidae =====
- Macromia erato
- Macromia irina
- Macromia katae
- Macromia splendens

===== Megapodagrionidae =====
- Sciotropis cyclanthorum
- Teinopodagrion temporale

===== Not Assigned =====
- Cordulephya bidens
- Cordulephya divergens
- Micromidia convergens
- Syncordulia gracilis
- Syncordulia legator
- Syncordulia venator

===== Pentaphlebiidae =====
- Pentaphlebia stahli

===== Philogeniidae =====
- Philogenia cristalina

===== Philosinidae =====
- Philosina alba

===== Platycnemididae =====
- Calicnemia nipalica
- Coeliccia exoleta
- Coeliccia flavostriata
- Coeliccia fraseri
- Disparoneura apicalis
- Elattoneura dorsalis
- Elattoneura pasquinii
- Lieftinckia lairdi
- Nososticta phoenissa
- Nososticta plagioxantha
- Nososticta taracumbi
- Risiocnemis pulchra

===== Platystictidae =====
- Drepanosticta centrosaurus
- Platysticta deccanensis
- Protosticta khaosoidaoensis
- Protosticta sanguinostigma

===== Polythoridae =====
- Cora lugubris

===== Synthemistidae =====
- Archaeosynthemis spiniger
- Eusynthemis deniseae
- Synthemis alecto

===== Thaumatoneuridae =====
- Paraphlebia zoe

==== Orthoptera ====
===== Acrididae =====
- Acrida bara
- Acridoderes uvarovi
- Acrolophitus pulchellus
- Acrophymus rossi
- Acrotylus apicalis
- Afrophlaeoba usambarica
- Aneuryphymus montanus
- Appalachia arcana
- Arcyptera brevipennis
- Aulacobothrus popovi
- Cardeniopsis regalis
- Chloealtis aspasma
- Chromochokwea fitzgeraldi
- Eupropacris uniformis
- Eximacris superbum
- Gomphoceridius brevipennis
- Heteracris trimaculata
- Italohippus modestus
- Ixalidium sjostedti
- Ixalidium transiens
- Omocestus antigai
- Omocestus bolivari
- Omocestus defauti
- Omocestus femoralis
- Oropodisma erymanthosi
- Oropodisma kyllinii
- Oropodisma macedonica
- Oropodisma taygetosi
- Phymeurus brachypterus
- Phymeurus chianga
- Phymeurus granulatus
- Phymeurus illepidus
- Phymeurus machadoi
- Phymeurus nimbaensis
- Podisma carpetana
- Podismopsis keisti
- Podismopsis styriaca
- Rammeihippus turcicus
- Sphingonotus imitans
- Stenobothrus eurasius
- Stenobothrus grammicus
- Stenobothrus ursulae
- Xerohippus occidentalis

===== Eumastacidae =====
- Eumorsea pinaleno
- Psychomastax deserticola

===== Gryllidae =====
- Acroneuroptila puddui
- Acroneuroptila sardoa
- Ovaliptila kinzelbachi
- Ovaliptila nana
- Phalangacris phaloricephala
- Thaumatogryllus cavicola
- Thaumatogryllus variegatus

===== Mogoplistidae =====
- Cycloptilum irregularis

===== Pamphagidae =====
- Acinipe segurensis
- Asiotmethis limbatus
- Orchamus raulinii
- Prionotropis hystrix

===== Pneumoridae =====
- Bullacris obliqua
- Peringueyacris namaqua

===== Rhaphidophoridae =====
- Daihinibaenetes arizonensis
- Dolichopoda aegilion
- Dolichopoda baccettii
- Dolichopoda calidnae
- Dolichopoda capreensis
- Dolichopoda cassagnaui
- Dolichopoda dalensi
- Dolichopoda gasparoi
- Dolichopoda giulianae
- Dolichopoda graeca
- Dolichopoda ithakii
- Dolichopoda kalithea
- Dolichopoda matsakisi
- Dolichopoda muceddai
- Dolichopoda naxia
- Dolichopoda pavesii
- Dolichopoda petrochilosi
- Dolichopoda saraolacosi
- Dolichopoda thasosensis
- Macrobaenetes kelsoensis
- Macrobaenetes valgum
- Pristoceuthophilus sp. nov.
- Tasmanoplectron isolatum
- Utabaenetes tanneri

===== Stenopelmatidae =====
- Ammopelmatus kelsoensis
- Ammopelmatus muwu
- Deinacrida fallai
- Deinacrida heteracantha
- Deinacrida rugosa
- Stenopelmatus cahuilaensis
- Stenopelmatus navajo

===== Tetrigidae =====
- Andriana intermedia
- Andriana tertia
- Charagotettix stenocnemis
- Pseudosystolederus follvikae
- Tetrix sierrana
- Thymochares pieraggii

===== Tettigoniidae =====
- Africariola longicauda
- Amyttacta marakelensis
- Anadrymadusa brevipennis
- Andreiniimon nuptialis
- Anonconotus mercantouri
- Aroegas dilatatus
- Arytropteris basalis
- Austrosaga spinifer
- Banza nihoa
- Belocephalus micanopy
- Belocephalus sleighti
- Brinckiella aptera
- Brinckiella karooensis
- Brinckiella mauerbergerorum
- Callicrania denticulata
- Clonia lalandei
- Clonia uvarovi
- Conocephalus peringueyi
- Conocephalus zlobini
- Coracinotus notarioi
- Decticus loudoni
- Ephippiger provincialis
- Euconocephalus remotus
- Eupholidoptera annamariae
- Eupholidoptera cretica
- Eupholidoptera forcipata
- Eupholidoptera gemellata
- Eupholidoptera giuliae
- Eupholidoptera icariensis
- Eupholidoptera jacquelinae
- Eupholidoptera latens
- Eupholidoptera leucasi
- Eupholidoptera mariannae
- Eupholidoptera pallipes
- Hemisaga lucifer
- Hemisaga vepreculae
- Isophya dobrogensis
- Isophya dochia
- Isophya obtusa
- Leptophyes discoidalis
- Metrioptera caprai
- Metrioptera domogledi
- Montana macedonica
- Onconotus servillei
- Pachysaga munggai
- Paracilacris lateralis
- Paracilacris mordax
- Parasteropleurus balearicus
- Parnassiana coracis
- Parnassiana dirphys
- Parnassiana fusca
- Parnassiana parnon
- Parnassiana tenuis
- Phasmodes jeeba
- Poecilimon athos
- Poecilimon ikariensis
- Poecilimon istanbul
- Pomatonota dregii
- Psacadonotus seriatus
- Psalmatophanes barretoi
- Rhacocleis crypta
- Rhacocleis derrai
- Rhacocleis distinguenda
- Rhacocleis ferdinandi
- Rhacocleis lithoscirtetes
- Roeseliana azami
- Roeseliana oporina
- Saga gracilis
- Saga pedo
- Tessellana lagrecai
- Thoracistus aureoportalis
- Thoracistus viridicrus
- Windbalea viride
- Zaprochilus ninae

===== Trigonidiidae =====
- Caconemobius howarthi
- Caconemobius schauinslandi
- Caconemobius varius
- Metioche luteolus

==== Phasmatodea ====
===== Diapheromeridae =====
- Malandella queenslandica

===== Phasmatidae =====
- Ramulus stilpnoides

==== Plecoptera ====
===== Eustheniidae =====
- Eusthenia nothofagi

===== Gripopterygidae =====
- Leptoperla cacuminis

=== Malacostraca ===
==== Amphipoda ====
===== Crangonyctidae =====
- Allocrangonyx hubrichti
- Allocrangonyx pellucidus
- Crangonyx grandimanus
- Crangonyx hobbsi
- Stygobromus araeus
- Stygobromus arizonensis
- Stygobromus balconis
- Stygobromus barri
- Stygobromus bifurcatus
- Stygobromus bowmani
- Stygobromus clantoni
- Stygobromus conradi
- Stygobromus cooperi
- Stygobromus dejectus
- Stygobromus elatus
- Stygobromus emarginatus
- Stygobromus ephemerus
- Stygobromus flagellatus
- Stygobromus gradyi
- Stygobromus hadenoecus
- Stygobromus harai
- Stygobromus heteropodus
- Stygobromus hubbsi
- Stygobromus indentatus
- Stygobromus longipes
- Stygobromus mackenziei
- Stygobromus montanus
- Stygobromus morrisoni
- Stygobromus mundus
- Stygobromus nortoni
- Stygobromus onondagaensis
- Stygobromus ozarkensis
- Stygobromus parvus
- Stygobromus pizzinii
- Stygobromus putealis
- Stygobromus reddelli
- Stygobromus smithi
- Stygobromus spinatus
- Stygobromus stellmacki
- Stygobromus subtilis
- Stygobromus wengerorum

===== Gammaridae =====
- Gammarus bousfieldi
- Gammarus hyalelloides
- Gammarus pecos

===== Niphargidae =====
- Carinurella paradoxa
- Niphargobates lefkodemonaki
- Niphargobates orophobata
- Niphargus aberrans
- Niphargus hadzii
- Niphargus hrabei
- Niphargus sphagnicolus
- Niphargus spoeckeri
- Niphargus stenopus
- Niphargus timavi
- Niphargus valachicus

===== Paramelitidae =====
- Paramelita flexa

==== Anaspidacea ====
===== Anaspididae =====
- Allanaspides helonomus
- Allanaspides hickmani
- Paranaspides lacustris

===== Psammaspididae =====
- Eucrenonaspides oinotheke

==== Decapoda ====
===== Astacidae =====
- Astacus astacus

===== Atyidae =====
- Archaetya chacei
- Atya ortmannioides
- Atyaephyra strymonensis
- Caridina ablepsia
- Caridina acuta
- Caridina acutirostris
- Caridina anislaq
- Caridina batuan
- Caridina boholensis
- Caridina breviata
- Caridina bunyonyiensis
- Caridina caerulea
- Caridina camaro
- Caridina caverna
- Caridina cavernicola
- Caridina demenica
- Caridina dianchiensis
- Caridina ensifera
- Caridina feixiana
- Caridina gordonae
- Caridina gortio
- Caridina guangxiensis
- Caridina leclerci
- Caridina longidigita
- Caridina mengae
- Caridina minidentata
- Caridina pseudodenticulata
- Caridina pseudonilotica
- Caridina samar
- Caridina sarasinorum
- Caridina schenkeli
- Caridina semiblepsia
- Caridina sodenensis
- Caridina spelunca
- Caridina trifasciata
- Caridina valencia
- Edoneus erwini
- Edoneus marulas
- Edoneus sketi
- Marosina brevirostris
- Marosina longirostris
- Neocaridina brevidactyla
- Palaemonias ganteri
- Paracaridina longispina
- Parisia deharvengi
- Parisia macrophora
- Stygiocaris lancifera
- Stygiocaris stylifera
- Troglocaris bosnica
- Troglocaris kapelana
- Troglocaris neglecta
- Troglocaris prasence
- Typhlatya consobrina
- Typhlatya elenae
- Typhlatya garciadebrasi
- Typhlatya garciai
- Typhlatya miravetensis
- Typhlatya taina
- Typhlocaridina lanceifrons
- Typhlocaridina liui
- Typhlocaridina semityphlata

===== Cambaridae =====
- Cambarus clivosus
- Cambarus eeseeohensis
- Cambarus elkensis
- Cambarus jonesi
- Distocambarus hunteri
- Distocambarus youngineri
- Fallicambarus jeanae
- Orconectes bisectus
- Orconectes eupunctus
- Orconectes hartfieldi
- Orconectes incomptus
- Orconectes peruncus
- Orconectes quadruncus
- Orconectes saxatilis
- Orconectes taylori
- Orconectes wrighti
- Procambarus cavernicola
- Procambarus citlaltepetl
- Procambarus ruthveni

===== Gecarcinucidae =====
- Adeleana forcarti
- Arachnothelphusa melanippe
- Austrothelphusa tigrina
- Austrothelphusa valentula
- Heterothelphusa fatum
- Irmengardia johnsoni
- Liotelphusa quadrata
- Mainitia mainitensis
- Mekhongthelphusa kengsaphu
- Mekhongthelphusa tetragona
- Nautilothelphusa zimmeri
- Oziothelphusa biloba
- Oziotelphusa hippocastanum
- Oziothelphusa ritigala
- Oziothelphusa stricta
- Oziothelphusa wagrakarowensis
- Parathelphusa balabac
- Parathelphusa cabayugan
- Parathelphusa crocea
- Parathelphusa maindroni
- Parathelphusa ovum
- Parathelphusa pantherina
- Parathelphusa possoensis
- Perbrinckia fenestra
- Perbrinckia integra
- Phricotelphusa callianira
- Phricotelphusa elegans
- Phricotelphusa limula
- Phricotelphusa ranongi
- Sayamia maehongsonensis
- Stygothelphusa bidiensis
- Sundathelphusa minahassae
- Sundathelphusa rubra

===== Palaemonidae =====
- Leptopalaemon gibbosus
- Leptopalaemon gudjangah
- Leptopalaemon magelensis
- Macrobrachium acanthochirus
- Macrobrachium acherontium
- Macrobrachium elegantum
- Macrobrachium gurudeve
- Macrobrachium lingyunense
- Macrobrachium tuxtlaense
- Troglocubanus calcis
- Troglocubanus gibarensis
- Troglocubanus inermis

===== Palinuridae =====
- Palinurus elephas

===== Parastacidae =====
- Astacoides betsileoensis
- Astacoides caldwelli
- Astacoides crosnieri
- Astacoides hobbsi
- Cherax destructor
- Cherax papuanus
- Engaeus rostrogaleatus
- Engaeus urostrictus
- Engaeus yabbimunna
- Euastacus bispinosus
- Euastacus simplex
- Euastacus sulcatus
- Euastacus suttoni
- Euastacus yarreansis
- Geocharax falcata
- Ombrastacoides pulcher

===== Potamidae =====
- Cryptopotamon anacoluthon
- Geothelphusa miyakoensis
- Geothelphusa nanao
- Geothelphusa pingtung
- Geothelphusa takuan
- Geothelphusa taroko
- Geothelphusa wangi
- Geothelphusa wutai
- Indochinamon cua
- Indochinamon dangi
- Indochinamon guttum
- Indochinamon mieni
- Iomon luangprabangense
- Isolapotamon bauense
- Johora counsilmani
- Johora gapensis
- Johora johorensis
- Johora thoi
- Malayopotamon granulatum
- Nanhaipotamon formosanum
- Nemoron nomas
- Parapotamon spinescens
- Potamon bileki
- Pupamon phrae
- Sinopotamon ebianense
- Sinopotamon hanyangense
- Stelomon erawanense
- Stelomon kanchanaburiense
- Stoliczia bella
- Stoliczia changmanae
- Stoliczia cognata
- Stoliczia goal
- Stoliczia karenae
- Stoliczia kedahensis
- Stoliczia leoi
- Stoliczia pahangensis
- Stoliczia panhai
- Stoliczia perlensis
- Stoliczia tweedei
- Tiwaripotamon edostilus

===== Potamonautidae =====
- Liberonautes nimba
- Potamonautes gerdalensis
- Potamonautes ignestii
- Potamonautes infravallatus
- Potamonautes lividus
- Potamonautes pilosus
- Potamonautes raybouldi
- Potamonautes reidi
- Potamonautes subukia
- Potamonautes triangulus
- Potamonautes unisulcatus
- Potamonautes xiphoidus
- Potamonemus sachsi
- Seychellum alluaudi

===== Pseudothelphusidae =====
- Allacanthos pittieri
- Chaceus ibiricensis
- Elsalvadoria zurstrasseni
- Epilobocera haytensis
- Epilobocera wetherbeei
- Fredius granulatus
- Hypolobocera alata
- Hypolobocera andagoensis
- Hypolobocera barbacensis
- Hypolobocera cajambrensis
- Hypolobocera gracilignatha
- Hypolobocera rathbuni
- Hypolobocera rotundilobata
- Hypolobocera velezi
- Lindacatalina sumacensis
- Microthelphusa forcarti
- Moritschus altaquerensis
- Moritschus ecuadorensis
- Neopseudothelphusa fossor
- Phrygiopilus acanthophallus
- Potamocarcinus hartmanni
- Potamocarcinus roatensis
- Ptychophallus tristani
- Raddaus mertensi
- Rodriguezus trujillensis

===== Trichodactylidae =====
- Avotrichodactylus oaxensis
- Bottiella cucutensis
- Bottiella medemi

===== Typhlocarididae =====
- Typhlocaris salentina

==== Isopoda ====
===== Armadillidae =====
- Sumatrillo sp. nov. 'HC - blind'

===== Asellidae =====
- Caecidotea macropoda
- Caecidotea nickajackensis
- Lirceus culveri
- Proasellus parvulus
- Proasellus slovenicus

===== Cirolanidae =====
- Antrolana lira
- Arubolana imula
- Mexilana saluposi
- Sphaerolana karenae

===== Phreatoicidae =====
- Onchotelson brevicaudatus
- Onchotelson spatulatus
- Uramphisopus pearsoni

===== Sphaeromatidae =====
- Monolistra calopyge
- Monolistra schottlaenderi

===== Stenasellidae =====
- Mexistenasellus nulemex
- Mexistenasellus parzefalli
- Mexistenasellus wilkensi

===== Trichoniscidae =====
- Calconiscellus gottscheensis
- Haplophthalmus abbreviatus
- Haplophthalmus rhinoceros
- Metatrichoniscoides celticus
- Moserius percoi

=== Maxillopoda ===
==== Calanoida ====
===== Centropagidae =====
- Boeckella bispinosa
- Boeckella calcaris
- Boeckella geniculata
- Boeckella nyoraensis
- Boeckella shieli
- Calamoecia australica
- Calamoecia elongata
- Calamoecia zeidleri
- Hemiboeckella powellensis

===== Diaptomidae =====
- Aglaodiaptomus kingsburyae
- Aglaodiaptomus marshianus
- Allodiaptomus satanas
- Arctodiaptomus burduricus
- Arctodiaptomus euacanthus
- Arctodiaptomus kamtschaticus
- Arctodiaptomus michaeli
- Dussartius baeticus
- Eodiaptomus lumholtzi
- Eodiaptomus shihi
- Heliodiaptomus kolleruensis
- Heliodiaptomus pulcher
- Hesperodiaptomus augustaensis
- Hesperodiaptomus californiensis
- Lovenula excellens
- Lovenula simplex
- Mastigodiaptomus purpureus
- Metadiaptomus capensis
- Metadiaptomus purcelli
- Neodiaptomus intermedius
- Neodiaptomus laii
- Neodiaptomus lymphatus
- Neodiaptomus physalipus
- Notodiaptomus dubius
- Notodiaptomus maracaibensis
- Paradiaptomus natalensis
- Phyllodiaptomus wellekensae
- Skistodiaptomus carolinensis
- Stygodiaptomus kieferi
- Stygodiaptomus petkovskii
- Thermodiaptomus galeboides
- Tropodiaptomus burundensis
- Tropodiaptomus kilimensis
- Tropodiaptomus kissi
- Tropodiaptomus neumanni
- Tropodiaptomus simplex
- Tropodiaptomus stuhlmanni

===== Temoridae =====
- Epischura baikalensis

==== Cyclopoida ====
===== Cyclopidae =====
- Acanthocyclops hypogeus
- Mesocyclops insulensis
- Metacyclops gasparoi
- Metacyclops postojnae
- Tropocyclops federensis
- Tropocyclops nananae

==== Harpacticoida ====
===== Ameiridae =====
- Nitocrella slovenica
- Nitocrella stochi

===== Canthocamptidae =====
- Canthocamptus dedeckkeri
- Canthocamptus echinopyge
- Canthocamptus longipes
- Canthocamptus mammillifurca
- Canthocamptus sublaevis
- Canthocamptus tasmaniae
- Ceuthonectes rouchi
- Elaphoidella amabilis
- Elaphoidella franci
- Elaphoidella jeanneli
- Elaphoidella kieferi
- Fibulacamptus bisetosus
- Fibulacamptus gracilior
- Paramorariopsis anae
- Pseudomoraria triglavensis

===== Darcythompsoniidae =====
- Leptocaris stromatolicolus

=== Xiphosura ===
==== Limulina ====
===== Limulidae =====
- Limulus polyphemus

=== Ostracoda ===
==== Myodocopida ====
===== Cypridinidae =====
- Zonocypretta kalimna

==== Podocopida ====
===== Candonidae =====
- Fabaeformiscandona aemonae
- Pseudocandona cavicola
- Pseudocandona pretneri
- Pseudocandona trigonelia

===== Limnocytheridae =====
- Leucocythere helenae
- Limnocythere porphyretica

===== Notodromadidae =====
- Newnhamia fuscata
- Newnhamia insolita

== Chordata ==
=== Actinopterygii ===
==== Acipenseriformes ====
===== Acipenseridae =====
- Acipenser brevirostrum
- Acipenser ruthenus
- Scaphirhynchus platorynchus

===== Polyodontidae =====
- Polyodon spathula

==== Albuliformes ====
===== Albulidae =====
- Albula glossodonta

==== Anguilliformes ====
===== Anguillidae =====
- Anguilla borneensis

===== Ophichthidae =====
- Paraletharchus opercularis
- Quassiremus evionthas

==== Atheriniformes ====
===== Atherinidae =====
- Atherinomorus lineatus
- Craterocephalus amniculus
- Craterocephalus dalhousiensis
- Craterocephalus gloveri
- Craterocephalus lacustris
- Paratherina cyanea
- Paratherina labiosa
- Paratherina striata
- Paratherina wolterecki
- Tominanga aurea
- Tominanga sanguicauda

===== Atherinopsidae =====
- Chirostoma arge
- Chirostoma bartoni
- Menidia extensa

===== Bedotiidae =====
- Bedotia masoala
- Bedotia sp. nov. 'Ankavia-Ankavanana'
- Bedotia sp. nov. 'Bemarivo'
- Bedotia sp. nov. 'Betampona'
- Bedotia sp. nov. 'Lazana'
- Bedotia sp. nov. 'Mahanara'
- Bedotia sp. nov. 'Namorona'
- Bedotia sp. nov. 'Nosivola'

===== Melanotaeniidae =====
- Cairnsichthys rhombosomoides
- Chilatherina alleni
- Chilatherina bleheri
- Glossolepis incisus
- Melanotaenia arfakensis
- Melanotaenia eachamensis
- Melanotaenia lacustris
- Melanotaenia oktediensis
- Melanotaenia parva

===== Phallostethidae =====
- Phallostethus dunckeri

===== Pseudomugilidae =====
- Pseudomugil connieae
- Pseudomugil pellucidus

===== Telmatherinidae =====
- Marosatherina ladigesi
- Telmatherina abendanoni
- Telmatherina antoniae
- Telmatherina celebensis
- Telmatherina obscura
- Telmatherina opudi
- Telmatherina prognatha
- Telmatherina sarasinorum
- Telmatherina wahjui

==== Batrachoidiformes ====
===== Batrachoididae =====
- Batrachoides boulengeri
- Daector reticulata
- Daector schmitti
- Sanopus astrifer
- Sanopus greenfieldorum
- Thalassophryne uranoscopus
- Vladichthys gloverensis

==== Beloniformes ====
===== Adrianichthyidae =====
- Oryzias celebensis
- Oryzias marmoratus
- Oryzias matanensis
- Oryzias nigrimas
- Oryzias profundicola

===== Hemiramphidae =====
- Dermogenys weberi
- Hyporhamphus xanthopterus
- Tondanichthys kottelati

==== Beryciformes ====
===== Holocentridae =====
- Myripristis clarionensis
- Myripristis gildi

==== Characiformes ====
===== Alestidae =====
- Alestopetersius smykalai
- Arnoldichthys spilopterus
- Brycinus brevis
- Brycinus carolinae
- Brycinus derhami
- Brycinus luteus
- Clupeocharax schoutedeni
- Lepidarchus adonis
- Micralestes comoensis

===== Anostomidae =====
- Leporinus muyscorum

===== Bryconidae =====
- Brycon fowleri
- Brycon moorei
- Brycon orthotaenia

===== Characidae =====
- Astyanax cordovae
- Astyanax trierythropterus
- Attonitus bounites
- Bryconamericus tolimae
- Cynopotamus atratoensis
- Genycharax tarpon
- Hyphessobrycon nigricinctus
- Knodus longus
- Pseudochalceus longianalis

===== Distichodontidae =====
- Distichodus petersii
- Nannocharax latifasciatus
- Nannocharax rubrolabiatus
- Neolebias spilotaenia

===== Prochilodontidae =====
- Ichthyoelephas longirostris

==== Clupeiformes ====
===== Clupeidae =====
- Alosa aestivalis
- Alosa immaculata
- Alosa macedonica
- Alosa sp. nov. 'Skadar'
- Microthrissa minuta
- Opisthonema berlangai
- Poecilothrissa moeruensis
- Sardinella maderensis
- Tenualosa thibaudeaui

===== Denticipitidae =====
- Denticeps clupeoides

===== Engraulidae =====
- Anchoa chamensis
- Stolephorus ronquilloi

===== Pristigasteridae =====
- Neoopisthopterus cubanus
- Opisthopterus effulgens

==== Cypriniformes ====
===== Balitoridae =====
- Aborichthys garoensis
- Aborichthys tikaderi
- Balitora mysorensis
- Cryptotora thamicola
- Hemimyzon confluens
- Hemimyzon taitungensis
- Mesonoemacheilus pambarensis
- Nemacheilus banar
- Nemacheilus keralensis
- Nemacheilus kodaguensis
- Nemacheilus menoni
- Nemacheilus pavonaceus
- Nemacheilus periyarensis
- Nemacheilus starostini
- Oreonectes anophthalmus
- Orthrias tschaiyssuensis
- Oxynoemacheilus eregliensis
- Oxynoemacheilus germencicus
- Oxynoemacheilus pindus
- Paracobitis smithi
- Physoschistura elongata
- Schistura atra
- Schistura chindwinica
- Schistura deansmarti
- Schistura inglisi
- Schistura jarutanini
- Schistura kaysonei
- Schistura khugae
- Schistura kontumensis
- Schistura nagaensis
- Schistura oedipus
- Schistura prashadi
- Schistura reticulofasciata
- Schistura sharavathiensis
- Schistura singhi
- Schistura spekuli
- Schistura spiesi
- Schistura susannae
- Schistura tubulinaris
- Seminemacheilus ispartensis
- Seminemacheilus lendlii
- Sewellia lineolata
- Sinogastromyzon puliensis
- Sundoreonectes sabanus
- Sundoreonectes tiomanensis
- Triplophysa gejiuensis
- Triplophysa xiangxiensis
- Yunnanilus brevis
- Yunnanilus niger
- Yunnanilus pleurotaenia

===== Catostomidae =====
- Catostomus cahita
- Catostomus conchos
- Catostomus leopoldi
- Catostomus wigginsi

===== Cobitidae =====
- Acantopsis octoactinotos
- Botia rostrata
- Cobitis dalmatina
- Cobitis maroccana
- Cobitis meridionalis
- Cobitis narentana
- Cobitis paludica
- Cobitis punctilineata
- Cobitis zanandreai
- Leptobotia elongata
- Protocobitis typhlops
- Serpenticobitis cingulata
- Yasuhikotakia nigrolineata
- Yasuhikotakia splendida

===== Cyprinidae =====
- Acanthobrama telavivensis
- Acheilognathus longipinnis
- Achondrostoma arcasii
- Alburnoides maculatus
- Alburnoides ohridanus
- Alburnoides prespensis
- Alburnus albidus
- Alburnus battalgilae
- Alburnus belvica
- Alburnus demiri
- Alburnus orontis
- Aspiolucius esocinus
- Bangana almorae
- Bangana behri
- Bangana musaei
- Bangana tonkinensis
- Barbodes hemictenus
- Barbodes lindog
- Barbodes manguaoensis
- Barbodes sirang
- Barbodes tumba
- Barboides gracilis
- Barbus alluaudi
- Barbus claudinae
- Barbus gruveli
- Barbus grypus
- Barbus haasi
- Barbus harterti
- Barbus issenensis
- Barbus ksibi
- Barbus paytonii
- Barbus petitjeani
- Barbus reinii
- Barbus sp. nov. 'Chimanimani'
- Barbus sp. nov. 'Pangani'
- Barbus taeniurus
- Barbus tauricus
- Barbus walkeri
- Barbus zalbiensis
- Barilius chatricensis
- Barilius dimorphicus
- Barilius dogarsinghi
- Barilius ngawa
- Caecobarbus geertsii
- Capoeta antalyensis
- Carasobarbus kosswigi
- Chelaethiops rukwaensis
- Chondrostoma holmwoodii
- Chondrostoma knerii
- Chondrostoma meandrense
- Chondrostoma prespense
- Chrosomus tennesseensis
- Cirrhinus cirrhosus
- Cirrhinus microlepis
- Cyprinella formosa
- Cyprinella monacha
- Cyprinella proserpina
- Cyprinion semiplotum
- Cyprinus carpio
- Danio jaintianensis
- Dawkinsia assimilis
- Dawkinsia rohani
- Delminichthys adspersus
- Delminichthys ghetaldii
- Devario acuticephala
- Devario anomalus
- Devario apopyris
- Devario assamensis
- Devario browni
- Devario fraseri
- Devario naganensis
- Devario yuensis
- Enteromius anniae
- Enteromius bagbwensis
- Enteromius cadenati
- Enteromius choloensis
- Enteromius collarti
- Enteromius dialonensis
- Enteromius ditinensis
- Enteromius eburneensis
- Enteromius foutensis
- Enteromius gurneyi
- Enteromius kissiensis
- Enteromius laticeps
- Enteromius niokoloensis
- Enteromius pseudotoppini
- Enteromius raimbaulti
- Enteromius salessei
- Epalzeorhynchos munense
- Eremichthys acros
- Garra allostoma
- Garra bispinosa
- Garra buettikeri
- Garra compressa
- Garra duobarbis
- Garra flavatra
- Garra litanensis
- Garra manipurensis
- Garra menoni
- Garra nambulica
- Garra paralissorhynchus
- Garra periyarensis
- Garra regressus
- Garra smarti
- Garra tana
- Gibbibarbus cyphotergous
- Gila ditaenia
- Gila nigrescens
- Gila orcuttii
- Gila purpurea
- Gobio feraeensis
- Gobio kovatschevi
- Gobio krymensis
- Gobio microlepidotus
- Gobio ohridanus
- Gymnocypris dobula
- Gymnocypris scleracanthus
- Horalabiosa palaniensis
- Hypselobarbus kolus
- Hypsibarbus lagleri
- Iberochondrostoma lemmingii
- Iberocypris alburnoides
- Iranocypris typhlops
- Labeo percivali
- Labeo pierrei
- Labeo rectipinnis
- Labeo rubromaculatus
- Labeo sp. nov. 'Baomo'
- Labeo sp. nov. 'Mzima'
- Labeo trigliceps
- Labeobarbus acutirostris
- Labeobarbus gorguari
- Labeobarbus huloti
- Labeobarbus ossensis
- Labeobarbus platydorsus
- Ladigesocypris ghigii
- Laubuca fasciata
- Laubuca khujairokensis
- Lepidomeda aliciae
- Lepidomeda mollispinis
- Leptocypris crossensis
- Leptocypris konkourensis
- Leptocypris taiaensis
- Luciobarbus brachycephalus
- Luciobarbus capito
- Luciobarbus comizo
- Luciobarbus esocinus
- Luciobarbus guiraonis
- Luciobarbus kottelati
- Luciobarbus microcephalus
- Luciobarbus steindachneri
- Luciobarbus xanthopterus
- Luciocyprinus langsoni
- Macrhybopsis australis
- Mesopotamichthys sharpeyi
- Mystacoleucus lepturus
- Naziritor chelynoides
- Neolissochilus subterraneus
- Neolissochilus theinemanni
- Notropis aguirrepequenoi
- Notropis buccula
- Notropis girardi
- Notropis imeldae
- Notropis melanostomus
- Notropis oxyrhynchus
- Notropis perpallidus
- Notropis semperasper
- Opsaridium microcephalum
- Oregonichthys kalawatseti
- Oxygaster pointoni
- Parachondrostoma toxostoma
- Parapsilorhynchus discophorus
- Parasinilabeo assimilis
- Pethia ater
- Pethia khugae
- Pethia ornata
- Pethia setnai
- Pethia shalynius
- Pethia yuensis
- Phoxinellus pseudalepidotus
- Phreatichthys andruzzii
- Poropuntius speleops
- Poropuntius tawarensis
- Pseudobarbus asper
- Pseudobarbus swartzi
- Pseudochondrostoma duriense
- Pseudochondrostoma willkommii
- Pseudohemiculter dispar
- Pseudolaubuca hotaya
- Pseudophoxinus antalyae
- Pseudophoxinus zekayi
- Pteronotropis welaka
- Ptychocheilus lucius
- Puntius arenatus
- Puntius mudumalaiensis
- Rasbora baliensis
- Rasbora ennealepis
- Rasbora ornata
- Rasbora tawarensis
- Rhinichthys cobitis
- Rhodeus atremius
- Rhodeus laoensis
- Rutilus panosi
- Rutilus prespensis
- Salmophasia belachi
- Salmophasia horai
- Scaphognathops bandanensis
- Schizothorax richardsonii
- Sinocyclocheilus anatirostris
- Sinocyclocheilus angularis
- Sinocyclocheilus anophthalmus
- Sinocyclocheilus hyalinus
- Sinocyclocheilus microphthalmus
- Siphateles boraxobius
- Squalius aradensis
- Squalius cephaloides
- Squalius janae
- Squalius recurvirostris
- Squalius svallize
- Squalius valentinus
- Tampichthys dichromus
- Tanakia tanago
- Telestes metohiensis
- Tor ater
- Troglocyclocheilus khammouanensis
- Tropidophoxinellus spartiaticus
- Typhlobarbus nudiventris
- Varicorhinus ansorgii
- Varicorhinus leleupanus
- Varicorhinus ruwenzori

==== Cyprinodontiformes ====
===== Aplocheilidae =====
- Pachypanchax arnoulti

===== Cyprinodontidae =====
- Crenichthys nevadae
- Cyprinodon bovinus
- Cyprinodon macularius
- Cyprinodon nevadensis
- Cyprinodon pecosensis
- Orestias chungarensis
- Orestias ctenolepis
- Orestias olivaceus
- Orestias pentlandii
- Orestias silustani

===== Fundulidae =====
- Fundulus euryzonus
- Fundulus grandissimus
- Fundulus jenkinsi
- Fundulus waccamensis

===== Goodeidae =====
- Characodon audax
- Girardinichthys multiradiatus
- Goodea gracilis

===== Nothobranchiidae =====
- Aphyosemion abacinum
- Aphyosemion aureum
- Aphyosemion bivittatum
- Aphyosemion coeleste
- Aphyosemion dargei
- Aphyosemion edeanum
- Aphyosemion louessense
- Aphyosemion primigenium
- Aphyosemion rectogoense
- Aphyosemion schluppi
- Aphyosemion thysi
- Aphyosemion wildekampi
- Callopanchax monroviae
- Epiplatys guineensis
- Epiplatys hildegardae
- Epiplatys lamottei
- Epiplatys longiventralis
- Nimbapanchax petersi
- Nimbapanchax viridis
- Nothobranchius albimarginatus
- Nothobranchius annectens
- Nothobranchius bojiensis
- Nothobranchius elongatus
- Nothobranchius flammicomantis
- Nothobranchius foerschi
- Nothobranchius geminus
- Nothobranchius interruptus
- Nothobranchius kilomberoensis
- Nothobranchius korthausae
- Nothobranchius lourensi
- Nothobranchius luekei
- Nothobranchius rubripinnis
- Nothobranchius steinforti
- Nothobranchius willerti
- Scriptaphyosemion schmitti

===== Poeciliidae =====
- Aplocheilichthys keilhacki
- Aplocheilichthys lacustris
- Aplocheilichthys omoculatus
- Aplocheilichthys sp. nov. 'Rovuma'
- Aplocheilichthys usanguensis
- Gambusia alvarezi
- Gambusia clarkhubbsi
- Gambusia gaigei
- Gambusia heterochir
- Gambusia hurtadoi
- Gambusia krumholzi
- Gambusia longispinis
- Micropanchax bracheti
- Plataplochilus miltotaenia
- Poeciliopsis sonoriensis
- Procatopus nimbaensis
- Rhexipanchax kabae
- Rhexipanchax lamberti

===== Rivulidae =====
- Anablepsoides lineasoppilatae
- Anablepsoides parlettei
- Aphyolebias obliquus
- Austrolebias affinis
- Campellolebias brucei
- Cynolebias boitonei
- Cynolebias constanciae
- Leptolebias marmoratus
- Leptolebias minimus
- Leptolebias opalescens
- Leptolebias splendens
- Simpsonichthys picturatus
- Spectrolebias pilleti

==== Elopiformes ====
===== Megalopidae =====
- Megalops atlanticus

==== Esociformes ====
===== Umbridae =====
- Umbra krameri

==== Gadiformes ====
===== Gadidae =====
- Gadus morhua
- Melanogrammus aeglefinus

==== Gasterosteiformes ====
===== Gasterosteidae =====
- Pungitius sinensis

===== Indostomidae =====
- Indostomus crocodilus

==== Gobiesociformes ====
===== Gobiesocidae =====
- Apletodon barbatus
- Arcos poecilophthalmus
- Gobiesox aethus
- Gobiesox canidens
- Gobiesox woodsi
- Tomicodon absitus
- Tomicodon bidens
- Tomicodon vermiculatus

==== Gonorynchiformes ====
===== Kneriidae =====
- Grasseichthys gabonensis
- Kneria ruaha
- Kneria uluguru
- Parakneria tanzaniae

==== Gymnotiformes ====
===== Apteronotidae =====
- Apteronotus spurrellii

===== Gymnotidae =====
- Gymnotus henni

==== Ophidiiformes ====
===== Bythitidae =====
- Lucifuga spelaeotes
- Lucifuga subterranea
- Lucifuga teresinarum
- Ogilbia cocoensis
- Ogilbia galapagosensis
- Paradiancistrus cuyoensis
- Stygicola dentata

===== Dinematichthyidae =====
- Typhlias pearsei

==== Osmeriformes ====
===== Galaxiidae =====
- Galaxias argenteus
- Galaxias depressiceps
- Galaxias gracilis
- Galaxias rostratus
- Galaxias sp. nov. 'Goukou'
- Galaxias sp. nov. 'Gourits'
- Galaxias sp. nov. 'Riviersonderend'
- Galaxias tanycephalus
- Galaxiella pusilla
- Paragalaxias mesotes

===== Salangidae =====
- Neosalanx regani

==== Osteoglossiformes ====
===== Mormyridae =====
- Campylomormyrus bredoi
- Ivindomyrus opdenboschi
- Marcusenius brucii
- Marcusenius cuangoanus
- Marcusenius ntemensis
- Marcusenius sanagaensis
- Marcusenius sp. nov. 'Malindi'
- Marcusenius sp. nov. 'Turkwell'
- Mormyrus cyaneus
- Mormyrus iriodes
- Myomyrus pharao
- Paramormyrops eburneensis
- Paramormyrops gabonensis
- Paramormyrops hopkinsi
- Paramormyrops longicaudatus
- Stomatorhinus microps

==== Perciformes ====
===== Acanthuridae =====
- Acanthurus chronixis

===== Anabantidae =====
- Ctenopoma nebulosum

===== Blenniidae =====
- Ecsenius kurti
- Ecsenius randalli
- Ecsenius tigris
- Ecsenius tricolor
- Entomacrodus chapmani
- Hypsoblennius proteus
- Medusablennius chani
- Meiacanthus abruptus
- Meiacanthus naevius
- Mimoblennius lineathorax
- Oman ypsilon
- Omobranchus aurosplendidus
- Omobranchus hikkaduwensis
- Omobranchus mekranensis
- Omobranchus smithi
- Ophioblennius clippertonensis
- Parablennius lodosus
- Parablennius serratolineatus
- Praealticus natalis
- Salarias atlantica
- Scartella nuchifilis
- Scartella poiti
- Scartella springeri

===== Callionymidae =====
- Callionymus comptus

===== Carangidae =====
- Trachurus trachurus

===== Chaenopsidae =====
- Acanthemblemaria atrata
- Acanthemblemaria castroi
- Acanthemblemaria mangognatha
- Acanthemblemaria stephensi
- Chaenopsis schmitti
- Emblemariopsis pricei

===== Channidae =====
- Channa diplogramme

===== Cheimarrichthyidae =====
- Cheimarrichthys fosteri

===== Cichlidae =====
- Alcolapia grahami
- Andinoacara biseriatus
- Apistogramma cinilabra
- Aulonocara aquilonium
- Aulonocara auditor
- Aulonocara ethelwynnae
- Aulonocara hansbaenschi
- Aulonocara hueseri
- Aulonocara kandeense
- Aulonocara korneliae
- Aulonocara maylandi
- Aulonocara nyassae
- Aulonocara steveni
- Benitochromis batesii
- Chindongo ater
- Chindongo cyaneus
- Chindongo demasoni
- Chindongo elongatus
- Chindongo flavus
- Chindongo heteropictus
- Chindongo longior
- Chindongo saulosi
- Chromidotilapia cavalliensis
- Chromidotilapia regani
- Copadichromis atripinnis
- Copadichromis geertsi
- Copadichromis mbenjii
- Copadichromis nkatae
- Copadichromis trewavasae
- Copadichromis verduyni
- Coptodon camerunensis
- Ctenochromis aff. pectoralis
- Cynotilapia axelrodi
- Cynotilapia zebroides
- Haplochromis aeneocolor
- Haplochromis ampullarostratus
- Haplochromis argens
- Haplochromis azureus
- Haplochromis bicolor
- Haplochromis bwathondii
- Haplochromis chromogynos
- Haplochromis commutabilis
- Haplochromis demeusii
- Haplochromis exspectatus
- Haplochromis fasciatus
- Haplochromis fischeri
- Haplochromis flaviijosephi
- Haplochromis fusiformis
- Haplochromis gigas
- Haplochromis howesi
- Haplochromis katavi
- Haplochromis luteus
- Haplochromis macrocephalus
- Haplochromis maxillaris
- Haplochromis megalops
- Haplochromis melanopterus
- Haplochromis moeruensis
- Haplochromis nubilus
- Haplochromis obliquidens
- Haplochromis orthostoma
- Haplochromis petronius
- Haplochromis piceatus
- Haplochromis plagiodon
- Haplochromis polli
- Haplochromis retrodens
- Haplochromis sauvagei
- Haplochromis schwetzi
- Haplochromis thereuterion
- Haplochromis tweddlei
- Haplochromis vanoijeni
- Haplochromis velifer
- Haplochromis welcommei
- Haplochromis xanthopteryx
- Harpagochromis sp. nov. 'frogmouth'
- Herichthys bartoni
- Herichthys minckleyi
- Herichthys pantostictus
- Iodotropheus declivitas
- Iodotropheus sprengerae
- Iodotropheus stuartgranti
- Labidochromis chisumulae
- Labidochromis flavigulis
- Labidochromis freibergi
- Labidochromis gigas
- Labidochromis heterodon
- Labidochromis ianthinus
- Labidochromis joanjohnsonae
- Labidochromis lividus
- Labidochromis mbenjii
- Labidochromis mylodon
- Labidochromis pallidus
- Labidochromis strigatus
- Labidochromis zebroides
- Lamprologus teugelsi
- Lamprologus tigripictilis
- Lamprologus werneri
- Lethrinops macrophthalmus
- Lethrinops oculatus
- Mchenga conophoros
- Mchenga cyclicos
- Mchenga thinos
- Melanochromis baliodigma
- Melanochromis chipokae
- Melanochromis dialeptos
- Melanochromis heterochromis
- Melanochromis lepidiadaptes
- Melanochromis loriae
- Metriaclima aurora
- Metriaclima benetos
- Metriaclima callainos
- Metriaclima chrysomallos
- Metriaclima cyneusmarginatum
- Metriaclima emmiltos
- Metriaclima estherae
- Metriaclima greshakei
- Metriaclima hajomaylandi
- Metriaclima lombardoi
- Metriaclima mbenjii
- Metriaclima melabranchion
- Metriaclima phaeos
- Metriaclima purum
- Metriaclima pyrsonotos
- Metriaclima sandaracinos
- Metriaclima thapsinogen
- Metriaclima xanstomachus
- Nanochromis consortus
- Nanochromis minor
- Nanochromis splendens
- Neolamprologus christyi
- Neolamprologus devosi
- Neolamprologus schreyeni
- Nyassachromis boadzulu
- Oreochromis andersonii
- Oreochromis latilabris
- Oreochromis macrochir
- Oreochromis ndalalani
- Oreochromis rukwaensis
- Oreochromis salinicola
- Orthochromis luichensis
- Orthochromis malagaraziensis
- Orthochromis rugufuensis
- Otopharynx lithobates
- Otopharynx pachycheilus
- Parananochromis brevirostris
- Paratilapia polleni
- Paretroplus damii
- Paretroplus kieneri
- Paretroplus sp. nov. 'Dridri mena'
- Petrotilapia chrysos
- Petrotilapia nigra
- Protomelas dejunctus
- Protomelas virgatus
- Pseudotropheus cyaneorhabdos
- Pseudotropheus galanos
- Pseudotropheus interruptus
- Pseudotropheus johannii
- Pseudotropheus perileucos
- Pseudotropheus purpuratus
- Pseudotropheus tursiops
- Ptychochromis sp. nov. 'Garaka'
- Simochromis margaretae
- Simochromis marginatus
- Steatocranus glaber
- Tahuantinsuyoa chipi
- Teleogramma gracile
- Teleogramma monogramma
- Tilapia busumana
- Tilapia discolor
- Tilapia joka
- Tristramella simonis
- Tropheops gracilior
- Tropheops microstoma
- Tropheops modestus
- Tropheops romandi
- Tropheops tropheops
- Tropheus duboisi
- Vieja hartwegi
- Xenotilapia burtoni

===== Dactyloscopidae =====
- Dactyloscopus insulatus
- Dactyloscopus lacteus
- Gillellus chathamensis
- Myxodagnus sagitta
- Platygillellus rubellulus

===== Datnioididae =====
- Datnioides undecimradiatus

===== Elassomatidae =====
- Elassoma boehlkei
- Elassoma okatie

===== Eleotridae =====
- Boroda expatria
- Gobiomorphus hubbsi
- Mogurnda spilota
- Mogurnda vitta

===== Epinephelidae =====
- Cromileptes altivelis
- Epinephelus albomarginatus
- Epinephelus bruneus
- Epinephelus gabriellae
- Epinephelus lanceolatus
- Hyporthodus flavolimbatus
- Hyporthodus niveatus
- Mycteroperca interstitialis
- Mycteroperca olfax
- Mycteroperca rosacea
- Plectropomus areolatus
- Plectropomus laevis

===== Gobiidae =====
- Awaous bustamantei
- Bathygobius lineatus
- Chlamydogobius gloveri
- Chriolepis dialepta
- Chriolepis lepidota
- Corcyrogobius lubbocki
- Coryphopterus alloides
- Coryphopterus eidolon
- Coryphopterus hyalinus
- Coryphopterus lipernes
- Coryphopterus personatus
- Coryphopterus thrix
- Coryphopterus tortugae
- Coryphopterus venezuelae
- Ctenogobius claytonii
- Didogobius amicuscaridis
- Elacatinus nesiotes
- Elacatinus prochilos
- Eleotrica cableae
- Gillichthys seta
- Glossogobius flavipinnis
- Glossogobius intermedius
- Glossogobius matanensis
- Gobiosoma hildebrandi
- Gobius tetrophthalmus
- Gorogobius stevcici
- Knipowitschia croatica
- Knipowitschia mermere
- Knipowitschia radovici
- Lentipes whittenorum
- Lythrypnus gilberti
- Lythrypnus insularis
- Mugilogobius adeia
- Mugilogobius latifrons
- Mugilogobius sarasinorum
- Padogobius nigricans
- Ponticola turani
- Psilotris boehlkei
- Rhinogobius albimaculatus
- Rhinogobius chiengmaiensis
- Sicyopus axilimentus
- Stenogobius keletaona
- Stiphodon imperiorientis
- Stiphodon surrufus
- Stupidogobius flavipinnis
- Tigrigobius redimiculus

===== Haemulidae =====
- Xenichthys agassizii
- Xenocys jessiae

===== Istiophoridae =====
- Kajikia albida
- Makaira nigricans

===== Kuhliidae =====
- Kuhlia sauvagii

===== Kyphosidae =====
- Girella zonata

===== Labridae =====
- Achoerodus gouldii
- Bodianus scrofa
- Bolbometopon muricatum
- Conniella apterygia
- Coris bulbifrons
- Halichoeres adustus
- Halichoeres discolor
- Halichoeres insularis
- Halichoeres malpelo
- Halichoeres salmofasciatus
- Labrus viridis
- Lachnolaimus maximus
- Semicossyphus pulcher
- Tautoga onitis
- Thalassoma robertsoni
- Thalassoma virens
- Xyrichtys victori
- Xyrichtys virens
- Xyrichtys wellingtoni

===== Labrisomidae =====
- Dialommus fuscus
- Gobioclinus dendriticus
- Labrisomus jenkinsi
- Labrisomus socorroensis
- Malacoctenus zonogaster
- Paraclinus fehlmanni
- Starksia galapagensis

===== Latidae =====
- Lates mariae

===== Lutjanidae =====
- Lutjanus campechanus
- Lutjanus cyanopterus
- Rhomboplites aurorubens

===== Microdesmidae =====
- Aioliops brachypterus

===== Mullidae =====
- Pseudupeneus prayensis

===== Nemipteridae =====
- Nemipterus virgatus

===== Osphronemidae =====
- Betta burdigala
- Betta chini
- Betta chloropharynx
- Betta hipposideros
- Betta macrostoma
- Betta pinguis
- Betta splendens
- Betta tomi
- Osphronemus exodon
- Pseudosphromenus dayi
- Sphaerichthys vaillanti

===== Percichthyidae =====
- Nannoperca obscura
- Nannoperca variegata

===== Percidae =====
- Ammocrypta clara
- Crystallaria asprella
- Etheostoma acuticeps
- Etheostoma australe
- Etheostoma bellator
- Etheostoma brevirostrum
- Etheostoma cinereum
- Etheostoma denoncourti
- Etheostoma etowahae
- Etheostoma forbesi
- Etheostoma grahami
- Etheostoma lemniscatum
- Etheostoma maculatum
- Etheostoma nianguae
- Etheostoma pallididorsum
- Etheostoma perlongum
- Etheostoma pottsii
- Etheostoma pseudovulatum
- Etheostoma sitikuense
- Etheostoma striatulum
- Etheostoma trisella
- Etheostoma tuscumbia
- Etheostoma wapiti
- Percina aurolineata
- Percina bimaculata
- Percina burtoni
- Percina crypta
- Percina cymatotaenia
- Percina rex
- Percina sipsi
- Percina tanasi
- Percina williamsi

===== Polynemidae =====
- Pentanemus quinquarius

===== Pomacanthidae =====
- Holacanthus clarionensis

===== Pomacentridae =====
- Altrichthys azurelineatus
- Altrichthys curatus
- Amblyglyphidodon batunai
- Amblyglyphidodon ternatensis
- Stegastes beebei
- Stegastes leucorus
- Stegastes redemptus

===== Pomatomidae =====
- Pomatomus saltatrix

===== Pseudochromidae =====
- Pseudochromis pesi

===== Sciaenidae =====
- Atractoscion aequidens
- Cynoscion othonopterus
- Odontoscion eurymesops
- Pseudotolithus senegallus
- Umbrina galapagorum

===== Scombridae =====
- Scomberomorus concolor
- Thunnus obesus
- Thunnus orientalis

===== Serranidae =====
- Anthias regalis
- Hypoplectrus maya
- Plectranthias chungchowensis
- Rypticus courtenayi
- Serranus socorroensis

===== Siganidae =====
- Siganus niger

===== Sparidae =====
- Acanthopagrus sivicolus
- Acanthopagrus vagus
- Cheimerius matsubarai
- Cymatoceps nasutus
- Dentex dentex
- Polysteganus praeorbitalis
- Rhabdosargus globiceps

===== Terapontidae =====
- Bidyanus bidyanus
- Hephaestus adamsoni
- Varia jamoerensis

===== Tripterygiidae =====
- Axoclinus cocoensis
- Axoclinus multicinctus
- Axoclinus rubinoffi
- Enneanectes smithi
- Lepidonectes bimaculatus
- Lepidonectes corallicola

==== Pleuronectiformes ====
===== Pleuronectidae =====
- Pleuronectes ferrugineus

===== Soleidae =====
- Zebrias lucapensis

==== Salmoniformes ====
===== Salmonidae =====
- Coregonus arenicolus
- Coregonus atterensis
- Coregonus candidus
- Coregonus clupeoides
- Coregonus confusus
- Coregonus danneri
- Coregonus hoyi
- Coregonus kiyi
- Coregonus lavaretus
- Coregonus lucinensis
- Coregonus maraena
- Coregonus subautumnalis
- Coregonus zenithicus
- Hucho taimen
- Oncorhynchus chrysogaster
- Salmo akairos
- Salmo fibreni
- Salmo nigripinnis
- Salmo ohridanus
- Salmo pelagonicus
- Salmo stomachicus
- Salvelinus confluentus
- Salvelinus evasus
- Salvelinus fimbriatus
- Salvelinus gracillimus
- Salvelinus killinensis
- Salvelinus mallochi
- Salvelinus maxillaris
- Salvelinus perisii
- Salvelinus sp. nov. 'Fjellfrøsvatn'
- Salvelinus struanensis
- Salvelinus youngeri
- Salvethymus svetovidovi

==== Scorpaeniformes ====
===== Cottidae =====
- Cottus extensus
- Cottus petiti
- Cottus scaturigo
- Cottus tenuis

===== Triglidae =====
- Prionotus miles
- Prionotus teaguei

==== Siluriformes ====
===== Akysidae =====
- Acrochordonichthys chamaeleon

===== Amphiliidae =====
- Amphilius dimonikensis
- Amphilius kakrimensis
- Amphilius mamonekenensis
- Dolichamphilius brieni
- Doumea chappuisi
- Doumea gracila
- Doumea thysi
- Paramphilius teugelsi
- Zaireichthys wamiensis

===== Ariidae =====
- Notarius cookei
- Notarius neogranatensis
- Sciades parkeri

===== Astroblepidae =====
- Astroblepus heterodon
- Astroblepus latidens
- Astroblepus supramollis
- Astroblepus ventralis

===== Bagridae =====
- Bagrus caeruleus
- Batasio travancoria
- Horabagrus brachysoma
- Mystus bocourti
- Pseudobagrus ichikawai
- Pseudomystus myersi

===== Callichthyidae =====
- Callichthys fabricioi

===== Clariidae =====
- Clariallabes teugelsi
- Clarias submarginatus
- Encheloclarias prolatus
- Encheloclarias tapeinopterus
- Gymnallabes nops
- Uegitglanis zammaranoi

===== Claroteidae =====
- Chrysichthys aluuensis
- Chrysichthys dageti
- Chrysichthys dendrophorus
- Chrysichthys helicophagus
- Chrysichthys longidorsalis
- Chrysichthys nyongensis
- Chrysichthys polli
- Notoglanidium pallidum
- Notoglanidium walkeri
- Parauchenoglanis pantherinus

===== Cranoglanididae =====
- Cranoglanis bouderius

===== Heptapteridae =====
- Pimelodella macrocephala
- Rhamdia reddelli
- Rhamdia zongolicensis

===== Ictaluridae =====
- Ictalurus mexicanus
- Noturus baileyi
- Noturus flavipinnis
- Noturus munitus
- Prietella lundbergi
- Satan eurystomus
- Trogloglanis pattersoni

===== Loricariidae =====
- Ancistrus bolivianus
- Chaetostoma branickii
- Chaetostoma marmorescens
- Hypostomus annectens
- Hypostomus wilsoni
- Pseudotocinclus tietensis

===== Mochokidae =====
- Chiloglanis benuensis
- Chiloglanis disneyi
- Chiloglanis elisabethianus
- Chiloglanis emarginatus
- Chiloglanis harbinger
- Chiloglanis kalambo
- Chiloglanis macropterus
- Chiloglanis mbozi
- Chiloglanis rukwaensis
- Synodontis arnoulti
- Synodontis brichardi
- Synodontis cuangoanus
- Synodontis lufirae
- Synodontis macrophthalmus
- Synodontis macrops
- Synodontis robbianus
- Synodontis ruandae

===== Pangasiidae =====
- Pangasius krempfi

===== Plotosidae =====
- Oloplotosus torobo

===== Siluridae =====
- Ompok fumidus

===== Sisoridae =====
- Gagata itchkeea
- Glyptothorax manipurensis
- Glyptothorax saisii
- Glyptothorax trewavasae
- Myersglanis jayarami
- Pseudecheneis sirenica
- Pseudecheneis ukhrulensis
- Sisor barakensis

===== Trichomycteridae =====
- Listrura camposi
- Trichomycterus chungarensis
- Trichomycterus regani
- Trichomycterus transandianus

==== Synbranchiformes ====
===== Chaudhuriidae =====
- Chendol lubricus

===== Mastacembelidae =====
- Mastacembelus aviceps
- Mastacembelus crassus
- Mastacembelus latens
- Mastacembelus taiaensis

===== Synbranchidae =====
- Monopterus indicus

==== Syngnathiformes ====
===== Syngnathidae =====
- Cosmocampus balli
- Hippocampus algiricus
- Hippocampus barbouri
- Hippocampus comes
- Hippocampus erectus
- Hippocampus histrix
- Hippocampus ingens
- Hippocampus kelloggi
- Hippocampus kuda
- Hippocampus mohnikei
- Hippocampus patagonicus
- Hippocampus spinosissimus
- Hippocampus trimaculatus
- Microphis insularis

==== Tetraodontiformes ====
===== Balistidae =====
- Balistes capriscus
- Balistes punctatus

===== Molidae =====
- Mola mola

===== Monacanthidae =====
- Oxymonacanthus longirostris

===== Tetraodontidae =====
- Arothron inconditus
- Canthigaster marquesensis
- Carinotetraodon travancoricus
- Liosaccus pachygaster
- Tetraodon pustulatus

=== Amphibia ===
==== Anura ====
===== Alsodidae =====
- Alsodes montanus
- Alsodes tumultuosus
- Eupsophus queulensis

===== Alytidae =====
- Alytes dickhilleni
- Alytes muletensis

===== Aromobatidae =====
- Allobates amissibilis
- Allobates chalcopis
- Allobates humilis
- Allobates olfersioides
- Allobates subfolionidificans
- Anomaloglossus beebei
- Anomaloglossus breweri
- Anomaloglossus murisipanensis
- Mannophryne olmonae
- Mannophryne trinitatis

===== Arthroleptidae =====
- Arthroleptis francei
- Arthroleptis nguruensis
- Astylosternus fallax
- Cardioglossa melanogaster
- Cardioglossa schioetzi
- Leptodactylodon polyacanthus
- Leptodactylodon ventrimarmoratus
- Leptopelis grandiceps
- Leptopelis karissimbensis
- Leptopelis palmatus
- Leptopelis ragazzii
- Leptopelis yaldeni

===== Batrachylidae =====
- Atelognathus nitoi
- Atelognathus reverberii
- Atelognathus salai
- Atelognathus solitarius
- Batrachyla fitzroya

===== Bombinatoridae =====
- Barbourula busuangensis
- Bombina lichuanensis

===== Bufonidae =====
- Anaxyrus exsul
- Ansonia mcgregori
- Ansonia muelleri
- Ansonia penangensis
- Ansonia siamensis
- Ansonia smeagol
- Ansonia tiomanica
- Atelopus flavescens
- Atelopus franciscus
- Atelopus spumarius
- Atelopus tricolor
- Bufo eichwaldi
- Didynamipus sjostedti
- Duttaphrynus microtympanum
- Duttaphrynus scorteccii
- Ghatophryne rubigina
- Incilius chompipe
- Incilius cycladen
- Incilius macrocristatus
- Melanophryniscus dorsalis
- Melanophryniscus macrogranulosus
- Melanophryniscus montevidensis
- Melanophryniscus orejasmirandai
- Mertensophryne lonnbergi
- Mertensophryne uzunguensis
- Metaphryniscus sosai
- Oreophrynella cryptica
- Oreophrynella huberi
- Oreophrynella macconnelli
- Oreophrynella nigra
- Oreophrynella quelchii
- Oreophrynella vasquezi
- Osornophryne percrassa
- Osornophryne sumacoensis
- Osornophryne talipes
- Pelophryne albotaeniata
- Pelophryne guentheri
- Pelophryne lighti
- Pelophryne misera
- Pelophryne rhopophilia
- Peltophryne empusa
- Peltophryne guentheri
- Peltophryne gundlachi
- Peltophryne taladai
- Rhaebo andinophrynoides
- Rhinella atacamensis
- Rhinella justinianoi
- Rhinella macrorhina
- Rhinella quechua
- Rhinella rubropunctata
- Rhinella ruizi
- Rhinella rumbolli
- Sclerophrys urunguensis
- Vandijkophrynus inyangae
- Wolterstorffina parvipalmata

===== Calyptocephalellidae =====
- Calyptocephalella gayi

===== Centrolenidae =====
- Celsiella revocata
- Centrolene buckleyi
- Centrolene daidaleum
- Centrolene geckoideum
- Centrolene hesperium
- Centrolene peristictum
- Centrolene quindianum
- Centrolene sabini
- Cochranella balionota
- Cochranella riveroi
- Cochranella xanthocheridia
- Espadarana durrellorum
- Hyalinobatrachium fragile
- Hyalinobatrachium ibama
- Hyalinobatrachium orientale
- Ikakogi tayrona
- Nymphargus cochranae
- Nymphargus garciae
- Nymphargus prasinus
- Nymphargus rosada
- Nymphargus ruizi
- Nymphargus siren
- Rulyrana adiazeta
- Sachatamia punctulata
- Vitreorana antisthenesi

===== Ceratobatrachidae =====
- Alcalus tasanae
- Cornufer akarithymus
- Cornufer parkeri
- Palmatorappia solomonis
- Platymantis banahao
- Platymantis hazelae
- Platymantis indeprensus
- Platymantis montanus
- Platymantis naomii
- Platymantis pseudodorsalis
- Platymantis pygmaeus
- Platymantis sierramadrensis
- Platymantis taylori

===== Ceratophryidae =====
- Ceratophrys stolzmanni

===== Ceuthomantidae =====
- Ceuthomantis aracamuni

===== Conrauidae =====
- Conraua alleni
- Conraua robusta

===== Craugastoridae =====
- Craugastor alfredi
- Craugastor aphanus
- Craugastor bocourti
- Craugastor brocchi
- Craugastor decoratus
- Craugastor matudai
- Craugastor persimilis
- Craugastor psephosypharus
- Craugastor pygmaeus
- Craugastor rhodopis
- Craugastor rivulus
- Craugastor tarahumaraensis
- Craugastor xucanebi
- Euparkerella robusta
- Euparkerella tridactyla
- Hypodactylus dolops
- Hypodactylus latens
- Lynchius simmonsi
- Oreobates amarakaeri
- Pristimantis actites
- Pristimantis albertus
- Pristimantis bicolor
- Pristimantis bicumulus
- Pristimantis boconoensis
- Pristimantis briceni
- Pristimantis bromeliaceus
- Pristimantis calcaratus
- Pristimantis calcarulatus
- Pristimantis ceuthospilus
- Pristimantis colomai
- Pristimantis colostichos
- Pristimantis crucifer
- Pristimantis cruciocularis
- Pristimantis diogenes
- Pristimantis dorsopictus
- Pristimantis duellmani
- Pristimantis elegans
- Pristimantis eremitus
- Pristimantis eriphus
- Pristimantis ernesti
- Pristimantis fallax
- Pristimantis floridus
- Pristimantis gracilis
- Pristimantis incomptus
- Pristimantis inusitatus
- Pristimantis johannesdei
- Pristimantis juanchoi
- Pristimantis lemur
- Pristimantis maculosus
- Pristimantis marahuaka
- Pristimantis merostictus
- Pristimantis muricatus
- Pristimantis nigrogriseus
- Pristimantis nyctophylax
- Pristimantis ornatissimus
- Pristimantis petersi
- Pristimantis platychilus
- Pristimantis polemistes
- Pristimantis polychrus
- Pristimantis pugnax
- Pristimantis quinquagesimus
- Pristimantis repens
- Pristimantis rosadoi
- Pristimantis ruedai
- Pristimantis rufioculis
- Pristimantis schultei
- Pristimantis scolodiscus
- Pristimantis signifer
- Pristimantis suetus
- Pristimantis supernatis
- Pristimantis turpinorum
- Pristimantis ventriguttatus
- Pristimantis vertebralis
- Psychrophrynella adenopleura
- Psychrophrynella ankohuma
- Psychrophrynella chacaltaya
- Psychrophrynella illampu
- Psychrophrynella kempffi
- Psychrophrynella pinguis
- Psychrophrynella quimsacruzis
- Psychrophrynella wettsteini
- Strabomantis anatipes
- Strabomantis biporcatus
- Strabomantis cheiroplethus
- Strabomantis cornutus
- Strabomantis ingeri
- Strabomantis necerus
- Strabomantis necopinus
- Tachiramantis douglasi
- Yunganastes ashkapara

===== Cycloramphidae =====
- Cycloramphus acangatan
- Thoropa petropolitana

===== Dendrobatidae =====
- Ameerega bassleri
- Ameerega pepperi
- Ameerega pongoensis
- Andinobates bombetes
- Andinobates cassidyhornae
- Andinobates dorisswansonae
- Andinobates opisthomelas
- Andinobates tolimensis
- Andinobates virolinensis
- Colostethus mertensi
- Hyloxalus awa
- Hyloxalus fascianigrus
- Hyloxalus pulchellus
- Hyloxalus vergeli
- Oophaga granulifera
- Ranitomeya benedicta
- Ranitomeya fantastica

===== Dicroglossidae =====
- Ingerana borealis
- Limnonectes acanthi
- Limnonectes diuatus
- Limnonectes fragilis
- Limnonectes heinrichi
- Limnonectes isanensis
- Limnonectes kenepaiensis
- Limnonectes liui
- Limnonectes macrodon
- Limnonectes megastomias
- Limnonectes visayanus
- Nannophrys ceylonensis
- Nanorana liui
- Nanorana minica
- Nanorana rostandi
- Occidozyga diminutiva
- Quasipaa acanthophora
- Quasipaa exilispinosa
- Quasipaa fasciculispina
- Quasipaa jiulongensis
- Quasipaa shini
- Quasipaa spinosa

===== Eleutherodactylidae =====
- Adelophryne baturitensis
- Diasporus ventrimaculatus
- Eleutherodactylus angustidigitorum
- Eleutherodactylus audanti
- Eleutherodactylus cooki
- Eleutherodactylus goini
- Eleutherodactylus guantanamera
- Eleutherodactylus leprus
- Eleutherodactylus limbatus
- Eleutherodactylus longipes
- Eleutherodactylus modestus
- Eleutherodactylus monensis
- Eleutherodactylus nivicolimae
- Eleutherodactylus pentasyringos
- Eleutherodactylus pictissimus
- Eleutherodactylus ricordii
- Eleutherodactylus ronaldi
- Eleutherodactylus rubrimaculatus
- Eleutherodactylus unicolor
- Eleutherodactylus varians
- Eleutherodactylus verrucipes
- Eleutherodactylus wetmorei

===== Hemiphractidae =====
- Cryptobatrachus boulengeri
- Gastrotheca angustifrons
- Gastrotheca atympana
- Gastrotheca bufona
- Gastrotheca chrysosticta
- Gastrotheca dendronastes
- Gastrotheca excubitor
- Gastrotheca gracilis
- Gastrotheca guentheri
- Gastrotheca pachachacae
- Gastrotheca phelloderma
- Gastrotheca plumbea
- Stefania riveroi
- Stefania schuberti

===== Hylidae =====
- Agalychnis litodryas
- Boana gladiator
- Bokermannohyla vulcaniae
- Charadrahyla nephila
- Charadrahyla taeniopus
- Colomascirtus antioquia
- Duellmanohyla schmidtorum
- Ecnomiohyla miliaria
- Exerodonta juanitae
- Exerodonta melanomma
- Exerodonta pinorum
- Exerodonta xera
- Hyla walkeri
- Hyloscirtus callipeza
- Hyloscirtus lindae
- Hyloscirtus platydactylus
- Hyloscirtus simmonsi
- Hyloscirtus torrenticola
- Hypsiboas heilprini
- Litoria andiirrmalin
- Litoria aurea
- Litoria becki
- Litoria daviesae
- Litoria freycineti
- Litoria lutea
- Litoria olongburensis
- Litoria quadrilineata
- Litoria subglandulosa
- Litoria wisselensis
- Nyctimystes avocalis
- Nyctimystes rueppelli
- Osteopilus pulchrilineatus
- Osteopilus vastus
- Tepuihyla rimarum
- Tlalocohyla godmani

===== Hyperoliidae =====
- Afrixalus enseticola
- Afrixalus morerei
- Afrixalus sylvaticus
- Afrixalus uluguruensis
- Callixalus pictus
- Hyperolius bopeleti
- Hyperolius burgessi
- Hyperolius constellatus
- Hyperolius endjami
- Hyperolius inyangae
- Hyperolius laurenti
- Hyperolius minutissimus
- Hyperolius polystictus
- Hyperolius riggenbachi
- Hyperolius spinigularis
- Hyperolius viridigulosus
- Kassina arboricola
- Kassina decorata
- Kassina lamottei
- Morerella cyanophthalma
- Paracassina kounhiensis

===== Leiopelmatidae =====
- Leiopelma hamiltoni
- Leiopelma pakeka

===== Leptodactylidae =====
- Leptodactylus nesiotus
- Leptodactylus peritoaktites
- Physalaemus atlanticus

===== Limnodynastidae =====
- Heleioporus australiacus

===== Mantellidae =====
- Aglyptodactylus laticeps
- Boehmantis microtympanum
- Boophis andohahela
- Boophis andreonei
- Boophis blommersae
- Boophis brachychir
- Boophis englaenderi
- Boophis fayi
- Boophis majori
- Boophis miniatus
- Boophis popi
- Boophis spinophis
- Boophis ulftunni
- Boophis vittatus
- Gephyromantis ambohitra
- Gephyromantis cornutus
- Gephyromantis enki
- Gephyromantis horridus
- Gephyromantis rivicola
- Gephyromantis runewsweeki
- Gephyromantis salegy
- Gephyromantis schilfi
- Gephyromantis silvanus
- Gephyromantis spiniferus
- Gephyromantis striatus
- Gephyromantis tahotra
- Gephyromantis tandroka
- Guibemantis kathrinae
- Guibemantis tasifotsy
- Mantella bernhardi
- Mantella crocea
- Mantella madagascariensis
- Mantella manery
- Mantidactylus tricinctus
- Spinomantis guibei
- Spinomantis massi
- Spinomantis tavaratra

===== Megophryidae =====
- Borneophrys edwardinae
- Leptobrachella baluensis
- Leptobrachella brevicrus
- Leptobrachella serasanae
- Leptobrachium hainanense
- Leptobrachium leucops
- Leptolalax hamidi
- Leptolalax isos
- Leptolalax kajangensis
- Megophrys auralensis
- Megophrys giganticus
- Megophrys nankiangensis
- Ophryophryne synoria
- Oreolalax granulosus
- Oreolalax jingdongensis
- Oreolalax major
- Oreolalax multipunctatus
- Oreolalax rhodostigmatus
- Scutiger gongshanensis
- Scutiger liupanensis
- Scutiger nepalensis
- Scutiger ruginosus
- Scutiger tuberculatus

===== Micrixalidae =====
- Micrixalus nudis
- Micrixalus phyllophilus
- Micrixalus saxicola

===== Microhylidae =====
- Anodonthyla montana
- Austrochaperina novaebritanniae
- Cophixalus aenigma
- Cophixalus nubicola
- Cophixalus saxatilis
- Cophyla occultans
- Copiula minor
- Dasypops schirchi
- Gastrophrynoides borneensis
- Hypopachus barberi
- Kalophrynus honbaensis
- Kalophrynus minusculus
- Kalophrynus punctatus
- Kaloula walteri
- Microhyla annamensis
- Microhyla arboricola
- Microhyla pineticola
- Oreophryne celebensis
- Oreophryne variabilis
- Plethodontohyla brevipes
- Rhombophryne mangabensis
- Rhombophryne staffordi
- Scaphiophryne boribory
- Scaphiophryne marmorata
- Uperodon nagaoi
- Uperodon triangularis

===== Myobatrachidae =====
- Crinia tinnula
- Geocrinia vitellina
- Mixophyes balbus
- Pseudophryne australis
- Spicospina flammocaerulea

===== Nyctibatrachidae =====
- Nyctibatrachus deccanensis
- Nyctibatrachus humayuni
- Nyctibatrachus major

===== Odontophrynidae =====
- Odontophrynus achalensis

===== Phrynobatrachidae =====
- Phrynobatrachus asper
- Phrynobatrachus kinangopensis
- Phrynobatrachus steindachneri
- Phrynobatrachus sulfureogularis
- Phrynobatrachus villiersi

===== Pipidae =====
- Xenopus amieti

===== Pyxicephalidae =====
- Anhydrophryne rattrayi
- Strongylopus kitumbeine
- Strongylopus rhodesianus

===== Ranidae =====
- Amolops jinjiangensis
- Amolops loloensis
- Amolops splendissimus
- Amolops torrentis
- Amolops tuberodepressus
- Amolops vitreus
- Amolops xinduqiao
- Huia masonii
- Indosylvirana aurantiaca
- Lithobates chiricahuensis
- Lithobates macroglossa
- Lithobates megapoda
- Lithobates miadis
- Lithobates okaloosae
- Lithobates sierramadrensis
- Lithobates tarahumarae
- Lithobates vibicarius
- Meristogenys jerboa
- Odorrana geminata
- Odorrana hainanensis
- Odorrana indeprensa
- Odorrana jingdongensis
- Odorrana junlianensis
- Odorrana nasuta
- Odorrana tormota
- Papurana waliesa
- Pelophylax chosenicus
- Pelophylax epeiroticus
- Pseudorana weiningensis
- Pterorana khare
- Rana draytonii
- Rana latastei
- Rana longicrus
- Rana pretiosa
- Sanguirana aurantipunctata
- Sanguirana igorota
- Sanguirana tipanan
- Staurois parvus
- Sylvirana faber
- Sylvirana spinulosa

===== Ranixalidae =====
- Indirana leithii

===== Rhacophoridae =====
- Buergeria oxycephala
- Chiromantis samkosensis
- Gracixalus jinxiuensis
- Gracixalus quangi
- Nyctixalus margaritifer
- Philautus acutirostris
- Philautus erythrophthalmus
- Philautus garo
- Philautus ingeri
- Philautus leitensis
- Philautus pallidipes
- Philautus refugii
- Philautus umbra
- Pseudophilautus hallidayi
- Raorchestes bobingeri
- Raorchestes bombayensis
- Raorchestes chromasynchysi
- Raorchestes dubois
- Raorchestes glandulosus
- Raorchestes graminirupes
- Raorchestes gryllus
- Rhacophorus fasciatus
- Rhacophorus indonesiensis
- Rhacophorus marmoridorsum
- Rhacophorus spelaeus
- Rhacophorus yinggelingensis
- Theloderma bambusicolum
- Theloderma moloch
- Theloderma petilum

===== Telmatobiidae =====
- Telmatobius arequipensis
- Telmatobius atahualpai
- Telmatobius brevipes
- Telmatobius carrillae
- Telmatobius hauthali
- Telmatobius hintoni
- Telmatobius huayra
- Telmatobius marmoratus
- Telmatobius oxycephalus
- Telmatobius peruvianus
- Telmatobius rimac
- Telmatobius sanborni
- Telmatobius truebae
- Telmatobius verrucosus
- Telmatobius yuracare

==== Caudata ====
===== Ambystomatidae =====
- Ambystoma bishopi
- Ambystoma californiense
- Ambystoma cingulatum

===== Hynobiidae =====
- Batrachuperus karlschmidti
- Batrachuperus pinchonii
- Batrachuperus tibetanus
- Batrachuperus yenyuanensis
- Hynobius arisanensis
- Hynobius boulengeri
- Hynobius stejnegeri
- Hynobius tokyoensis
- Hynobius yiwuensis
- Liua tsinpaensis
- Pachyhynobius shangchengensis
- Pseudohynobius flavomaculatus
- Pseudohynobius shuichengensis

===== Plethodontidae =====
- Aquiloeurycea galeanae
- Batrachoseps regius
- Batrachoseps simatus
- Batrachoseps stebbinsi
- Batrachoseps wrighti
- Bolitoglossa chica
- Bolitoglossa diminuta
- Bolitoglossa gracilis
- Bolitoglossa guaneae
- Bolitoglossa guaramacalensis
- Bolitoglossa insularis
- Bolitoglossa lignicolor
- Bolitoglossa medemi
- Bolitoglossa mombachoensis
- Bolitoglossa mulleri
- Bolitoglossa obscura
- Bolitoglossa orestes
- Bolitoglossa pesrubra
- Bolitoglossa rostrata
- Bolitoglossa sima
- Bolitoglossa sombra
- Chiropterotriton orculus
- Dendrotriton megarhinus
- Dendrotriton sanctibarbarus
- Dendrotriton xolocalcae
- Eurycea chisholmensis
- Eurycea junaluska
- Eurycea latitans
- Eurycea nana
- Eurycea neotenes
- Eurycea rathbuni
- Eurycea sosorum
- Eurycea tridentifera
- Eurycea wallacei
- Eurycea waterlooensis
- Gyrinophilus palleucus
- Hydromantes brunus
- Hydromantes shastae
- Isthmura bellii
- Nototriton gamezi
- Nototriton guanacaste
- Nototriton saslaya
- Nototriton tapanti
- Oedipina alfaroi
- Plethodon amplus
- Plethodon asupak
- Plethodon cheoah
- Plethodon fourchensis
- Plethodon hubrichti
- Plethodon meridianus
- Plethodon petraeus
- Plethodon shenandoah
- Plethodon sherando
- Plethodon shermani
- Pseudoeurycea cochranae
- Pseudoeurycea gadovii
- Pseudoeurycea mixteca
- Speleomantes flavus
- Speleomantes genei
- Speleomantes sarrabusensis
- Thorius macdougalli

===== Proteidae =====
- Proteus anguinus

===== Rhyacotritonidae =====
- Rhyacotriton olympicus

===== Salamandridae =====
- Chioglossa lusitanica
- Lyciasalamandra helverseni
- Lyciasalamandra luschani
- Mertensiella caucasica
- Neurergus crocatus
- Neurergus kaiseri
- Neurergus strauchii
- Paramesotriton fuzhongensis
- Pleurodeles nebulosus
- Salamandra algira
- Salamandra lanzai
- Tylototriton kweichowensis
- Tylototriton notialis
- Tylototriton shanorum
- Tylototriton wenxianensis
- Tylototriton ziegleri

==== Gymnophiona ====
===== Dermophiidae =====
- Dermophis mexicanus

===== Herpelidae =====
- Boulengerula fischeri

===== Ichthyophiidae =====
- Ichthyophis orthoplicatus
- Ichthyophis pseudangularis

=== Aves ===
==== Accipitriformes ====
===== Accipitridae =====
- Accipiter brachyurus
- Accipiter butleri
- Accipiter imitator
- Accipiter luteoschistaceus
- Accipiter princeps
- Aquila adalberti
- Aquila heliaca
- Buteo galapagoensis
- Buteo socotraensis
- Buteo ventralis
- Buteogallus lacernulatus
- Circaetus beaudouini
- Clanga clanga
- Clanga hastata
- Cryptoleucopteryx plumbea
- Haliaeetus pelagicus
- Haliaeetus sanfordi
- Harpyopsis novaeguineae
- Henicopernis infuscatus
- Nisaetus nanus
- Polemaetus bellicosus
- Spilornis elgini
- Spilornis kinabaluensis

===== Sagittariidae =====
- Sagittarius serpentarius

==== Anseriformes ====
===== Anatidae =====
- Anas albogularis
- Anas aucklandica
- Anas eatoni
- Anas luzonica
- Anser cygnoid
- Anser erythropus
- Aythya ferina
- Branta ruficollis
- Branta sandvicensis
- Clangula hyemalis
- Cyanochen cyanoptera
- Dendrocygna arborea
- Marmaronetta angustirostris
- Melanitta fusca
- Oxyura maccoa
- Polysticta stelleri
- Salvadorina waigiuensis
- Tachyeres leucocephalus

==== Bucerotiformes ====
===== Bucerotidae =====
- Aceros nipalensis
- Anthracoceros marchei
- Buceros hydrocorax
- Buceros mindanensis
- Bucorvus leadbeateri
- Bycanistes cylindricus
- Ceratogymna elata
- Rhabdotorrhinus exarhatus
- Rhyticeros cassidix
- Rhyticeros everetti
- Rhyticeros subruficollis

==== Caprimulgiformes ====
===== Apodidae =====
- Aerodramus elaphrus
- Aerodramus sawtelli
- Apus acuticauda
- Schoutedenapus schoutedeni

===== Caprimulgidae =====
- Caprimulgus concretus
- Caprimulgus solala
- Eurostopodus diabolicus
- Eurostopodus nigripennis

===== Trochilidae =====
- Anthocephala floriceps
- Chaetocercus bombus
- Coeligena consita
- Coeligena prunellei
- Eupherusa poliocerca
- Heliodoxa gularis
- Lophornis gouldii
- Oxypogon stuebelii
- Phlogophilus hemileucurus
- Thalurania ridgwayi

==== Charadriiformes ====
===== Alcidae =====
- Fratercula arctica
- Synthliboramphus craveri
- Synthliboramphus scrippsi
- Synthliboramphus wumizusume

===== Charadriidae =====
- Anarhynchus frontalis
- Charadrius sanctaehelenae
- Charadrius thoracicus
- Thinornis cucullatus

===== Glareolidae =====
- Glareola ocularis

===== Laridae =====
- Larus fuliginosus
- Larus relictus
- Onychoprion aleuticus
- Rissa brevirostris
- Rissa tridactyla
- Rynchops albicollis
- Saundersilarus saundersi
- Sternula balaenarum
- Sternula nereis

===== Scolopacidae =====
- Coenocorypha pusilla
- Gallinago macrodactyla
- Gallinago nemoricola
- Numenius tahitiensis
- Scolopax mira

===== Turnicidae =====
- Turnix everetti

==== Ciconiiformes ====
===== Ciconiidae =====
- Ciconia episcopus
- Leptoptilos javanicus

==== Columbiformes ====
===== Columbidae =====
- Alopecoenas kubaryi
- Alopecoenas stairi
- Columba elphinstonii
- Columba eversmanni
- Columba pallidiceps
- Columba punicea
- Columba torringtoniae
- Ducula bakeri
- Ducula brenchleyi
- Ducula carola
- Ducula pickeringii
- Gallicolumba crinigera
- Geophaps smithii
- Geotrygon caniceps
- Goura cristata
- Goura scheepmakeri
- Hemiphaga chathamensis
- Henicophaps foersteri
- Leptotila battyi
- Leptotila ochraceiventris
- Otidiphaps aruensis
- Patagioenas caribaea
- Patagioenas oenops
- Patagioenas subvinacea
- Phapitreron brunneiceps
- Ptilinopus chalcurus
- Ptilinopus dohertyi
- Ptilinopus granulifrons
- Ptilinopus insularis
- Ptilinopus rarotongensis
- Ramphiculus marchei
- Ramphiculus meridionalis
- Ramphiculus subgularis
- Streptopelia dusumieri
- Streptopelia turtur
- Treron capellei
- Treron floris
- Treron pembaensis
- Treron sanctithomae

==== Coraciiformes ====
===== Alcedinidae =====
- Actenoides hombroni
- Actenoides regalis
- Ceyx melanurus
- Ceyx mindanensis
- Ceyx websteri
- Tanysiptera ellioti
- Todiramphus funebris
- Todiramphus reichenbachii
- Todiramphus ruficollaris
- Todiramphus winchelli

===== Brachypteraciidae =====
- Brachypteracias leptosomus
- Geobiastes squamiger
- Uratelornis chimaera

===== Momotidae =====
- Electron carinatum

==== Cuculiformes ====
===== Cuculidae =====
- Centropus chlororhynchos
- Centropus nigrorufus
- Centropus rectunguis
- Coccyzus ferrugineus
- Neomorphus geoffroyi
- Phaenicophaeus pyrrhocephalus

==== Falconiformes ====
===== Falconidae =====
- Falco araeus
- Falco concolor
- Falco fasciinucha
- Falco hypoleucos
- Micrastur plumbeus

==== Galliformes ====
===== Cracidae =====
- Crax alector
- Crax fasciolata
- Crax rubra
- Ortalis erythroptera
- Penelope barbata
- Penelope jacucaca
- Penelope ochrogaster
- Penelope pileata
- Penelopina nigra

===== Megapodiidae =====
- Eulipoa wallacei
- Leipoa ocellata
- Megapodius bernsteinii
- Megapodius geelvinkianus
- Megapodius layardi
- Megapodius nicobariensis

===== Numididae =====
- Agelastes meleagrides

===== Odontophoridae =====
- Cyrtonyx ocellatus
- Dendrortyx barbatus
- Odontophorus atrifrons
- Odontophorus dialeucos
- Odontophorus melanonotus
- Ptilopachus nahani

===== Phasianidae =====
- Afropavo congensis
- Arborophila ardens
- Arborophila charltonii
- Arborophila mandellii
- Arborophila orientalis
- Catreus wallichii
- Crossoptilon mantchuricum
- Francolinus gularis
- Lophophorus lhuysii
- Lophophorus sclateri
- Lophura bulweri
- Lophura erythrophthalma
- Lophura pyronota
- Melanoperdix niger
- Polyplectron inopinatum
- Polyplectron malacense
- Polyplectron napoleonis
- Pternistis harwoodi
- Rhizothera dulitensis
- Syrmaticus reevesii
- Tragopan blythii
- Tragopan caboti
- Tragopan melanocephalus
- Tympanuchus cupido
- Tympanuchus pallidicinctus

==== Gruiformes ====
===== Gruidae =====
- Anthropoides paradiseus
- Antigone antigone
- Antigone vipio
- Balearica pavonina
- Bugeranus carunculatus
- Grus monacha
- Grus nigricollis

===== Psophiidae =====
- Psophia viridis

===== Rallidae =====
- Amaurornis magnirostris
- Aramides wolfi
- Aramidopsis plateni
- Atlantisia rogersi
- Coturnicops exquisitus
- Fulica alai
- Gallinula comeri
- Gallirallus australis
- Gallirallus calayanensis
- Gymnocrex rosenbergii
- Habroptila wallacii
- Laterallus spilonota
- Laterallus xenopterus
- Lewinia muelleri
- Porzana spiloptera
- Rallus antarcticus
- Rallus madagascariensis
- Zapornia atra

==== Mesitornithiformes ====
===== Mesitornithidae =====
- Mesitornis unicolor
- Mesitornis variegatus
- Monias benschi

==== Musophagiformes ====
===== Musophagidae =====
- Tauraco ruspolii

==== Otidiformes ====
===== Otididae =====
- Afrotis afra
- Chlamydotis macqueenii
- Chlamydotis undulata
- Otis tarda

==== Passeriformes ====
===== Acanthizidae =====
- Gerygone hypoxantha

===== Acrocephalidae =====
- Acrocephalus brevipennis
- Acrocephalus paludicola
- Acrocephalus rehsei
- Acrocephalus taiti
- Acrocephalus tangorum
- Calamonastides bensoni
- Calamonastides gracilirostris

===== Alaudidae =====
- Calendulauda burra

===== Bernieridae =====
- Crossleyia tenebrosa
- Xanthomixis apperti

===== Calcariidae =====
- Calcarius ornatus

===== Calyptophilidae =====
- Calyptophilus tertius

===== Campephagidae =====
- Ceblepyris cucullatus
- Edolisoma mindanense
- Edolisoma ostentum
- Lalage conjuncta
- Lalage typica
- Lobotos lobatus

===== Chloropseidae =====
- Chloropsis flavipennis
- Chloropsis media
- Chloropsis sonnerati

===== Cinclidae =====
- Cinclus schulzii

===== Cisticolidae =====
- Apalis chariessa
- Apalis karamojae
- Cisticola aberdare
- Prinia cinereocapilla
- Scepomycter winifredae

===== Corvidae =====
- Aphelocoma coerulescens
- Corvus leucognaphalus
- Cyanolyca mirabilis
- Cyanolyca nanus
- Dendrocitta bayleii
- Garrulus lidthi
- Gymnorhinus cyanocephalus
- Perisoreus internigrans
- Urocissa ornata

===== Cotingidae =====
- Carpornis melanocephala
- Cephalopterus penduliger
- Cotinga ridgwayi
- Doliornis remseni
- Doliornis sclateri
- Lipaugus conditus
- Lipaugus uropygialis
- Procnias nudicollis
- Procnias tricarunculatus
- Xipholena atropurpurea
- Zaratornis stresemanni

===== Dicaeidae =====
- Dicaeum haematostictum
- Dicaeum retrocinctum

===== Dicruridae =====
- Dicrurus waldenii

===== Emberizidae =====
- Emberiza rustica
- Emberiza sulphurata

===== Estrildidae =====
- Amandava formosa
- Erythrura kleinschmidti
- Erythrura viridifacies
- Lonchura oryzivora
- Lonchura vana

===== Eurylaimidae =====
- Pseudocalyptomena graueri
- Sarcophanops samarensis
- Sarcophanops steerii

===== Fringillidae =====
- Chlorodrepanis flava
- Chlorodrepanis stejnegeri
- Crithagra ankoberensis
- Crithagra xantholaema
- Drepanis coccinea
- Magumma parva
- Pyrrhula murina
- Pyrrhula waterstradti
- Serinus syriacus
- Spinus siemiradzkii
- Spinus yarrellii
- Telespiza cantans

===== Furnariidae =====
- Acrobatornis fonsecai
- Asthenes helleri
- Asthenes usheri
- Clibanornis erythrocephalus
- Cranioleuca berlepschi
- Cranioleuca curtata
- Cranioleuca marcapatae
- Dendrocolaptes hoffmannsi
- Dendrocolaptes punctipectus
- Geositta poeciloptera
- Phacellodomus dorsalis
- Sclerurus cearensis
- Synallaxis courseni
- Synallaxis fuscorufa
- Synallaxis hypochondriaca
- Synallaxis tithys
- Syndactyla ruficollis
- Thripophaga cherriei
- Thripophaga macroura
- Xiphocolaptes falcirostris

===== Grallariidae =====
- Grallaria alleni
- Grallaria bangsi
- Grallaria excelsa
- Grallaria gigantea
- Grallaria milleri
- Grallaria przewalskii
- Grallaria rufocinerea
- Grallaricula cucullata
- Grallaricula cumanensis
- Hylopezus auricularis

===== Hirundinidae =====
- Hirundo atrocaerulea
- Hirundo megaensis
- Progne murphyi
- Progne sinaloae
- Tachycineta euchrysea

===== Icteridae =====
- Euphagus carolinus
- Hypopyrrhus pyrohypogaster
- Icterus bonana
- Icterus oberi
- Leistes defilippii
- Molothrus armenti
- Xanthopsar flavus

===== Laniidae =====
- Lanius meridionalis

===== Leiothrichidae =====
- Chatarrhaea longirostris
- Garrulax bieti
- Garrulax cinereifrons
- Garrulax konkakinhensis
- Garrulax sukatschewi
- Kupeornis gilberti
- Liocichla omeiensis
- Trochalopteron meridionale
- Trochalopteron ngoclinhense
- Turdoides hindei

===== Locustellidae =====
- Bradypterus sylvaticus
- Chaetornis striata
- Locustella pleskei
- Megalurulus grosvenori
- Poodytes albolimbatus
- Poodytes caudatus
- Robsonius rabori
- Schoenicola platyurus

===== Malaconotidae =====
- Malaconotus gladiator

===== Maluridae =====
- Amytornis dorotheae
- Amytornis woodwardi

===== Meliphagidae =====
- Grantiella picta
- Macgregoria pulchra
- Melidectes princeps
- Myzomela batjanensis
- Myzomela chermesina
- Philemon fuscicapillus

===== Mimidae =====
- Mimus macdonaldi
- Toxostoma bendirei

===== Modulatricidae =====
- Arcanator orostruthus

===== Monarchidae =====
- Chasiempis sandwichensis
- Chasiempis sclateri
- Hypothymis coelestis
- Mayrornis schistaceus
- Metabolus takatsukasae
- Myiagra cervinicolor
- Myiagra hebetior
- Pomarea dimidiata
- Symposiachrus ateralbus
- Symposiachrus julianae

===== Motacillidae =====
- Amaurocichla bocagii
- Anthus nattereri
- Anthus nilghiriensis
- Anthus spragueii
- Hemimacronyx chloris

===== Muscicapidae =====
- Calliope obscura
- Cossypha heinrichi
- Cyornis brunneatus
- Cyornis caerulatus
- Cyornis camarinensis
- Ficedula basilanica
- Ficedula platenae
- Ficedula subrubra
- Fraseria lendu
- Larvivora tanensis
- Melaenornis annamarulae
- Muscicapa randi
- Phoenicurus bicolor
- Saxicola insignis
- Saxicola macrorhynchus
- Sheppardia lowei
- Swynnertonia swynnertoni
- Vauriella insignis

===== Nectariniidae =====
- Anthreptes rubritorques
- Cinnyris rockefelleri
- Cinnyris rufipennis
- Dreptes thomensis

===== Notiomystidae =====
- Notiomystis cincta

===== Oriolidae =====
- Oriolus crassirostris

===== Pachycephalidae =====
- Pachycephala rufogularis

===== Paradisaeidae =====
- Paradisaea decora
- Paradisornis rudolphi

===== Paridae =====
- Machlolophus nuchalis

===== Parulidae =====
- Basileuterus ignotus
- Cardellina versicolor
- Geothlypis beldingi
- Geothlypis flavovelata
- Myiothlypis basilica
- Setophaga cerulea

===== Passerellidae =====
- Arremon perijanus
- Arremon phygas
- Oreothraupis arremonops
- Pselliophorus luteoviridis

===== Passeridae =====
- Passer hemileucus
- Passer italiae

===== Pellorneidae =====
- Graminicola striatus
- Pellorneum palustre
- Ptilocichla falcata
- Ptilocichla leucogrammica
- Rimator naungmungensis
- Schoeniparus variegaticeps
- Turdinus calcicola

===== Petroicidae =====
- Petroica dannefaerdi

===== Phaenicophilidae =====
- Xenoligea montana

===== Philepittidae =====
- Neodrepanis hypoxantha

===== Phylloscopidae =====
- Phylloscopus amoenus
- Phylloscopus hainanus
- Phylloscopus ijimae
- Phylloscopus maforensis
- Phylloscopus misoriensis

===== Picathartidae =====
- Picathartes gymnocephalus
- Picathartes oreas

===== Pipridae =====
- Chloropipo flavicapilla
- Lepidothrix iris
- Lepidothrix vilasboasi
- Neopelma aurifrons

===== Pittidae =====
- Erythropitta inspeculata
- Erythropitta splendida
- Erythropitta venusta
- Hydrornis baudii
- Hydrornis schneideri
- Pitta anerythra
- Pitta nympha
- Pitta rosenbergii
- Pitta steerii

===== Ploceidae =====
- Ploceus bannermani
- Ploceus burnieri
- Ploceus flavipes
- Ploceus megarhynchus
- Ploceus subpersonatus

===== Pycnonotidae =====
- Criniger olivaceus
- Hypsipetes olivaceus
- Hypsipetes parvirostris
- Phyllastrephus viridiceps
- Pycnonotus dispar
- Pycnonotus snouckaerti
- Pycnonotus taivanus
- Pycnonotus xantholaemus
- Setornis criniger

===== Rhinocryptidae =====
- Scytalopus panamensis
- Scytalopus perijanus

===== Rhipiduridae =====
- Lamprolia klinesmithi
- Rhipidura malaitae
- Rhipidura sauli
- Rhipidura semirubra

===== Sittidae =====
- Sitta formosa
- Sitta whiteheadi

===== Sturnidae =====
- Acridotheres javanicus
- Aplonis brunneicapillus
- Aplonis cinerascens
- Poeoptera femoralis
- Rhabdornis rabori
- Sturnornis albofrontatus

===== Sylviidae =====
- Chrysomma altirostre
- Paradoxornis flavirostris
- Sinosuthora przewalskii
- Sinosuthora zappeyi
- Sylvia nigricapillus

===== Thamnophilidae =====
- Ampelornis griseiceps
- Biatas nigropectus
- Cercomacra ferdinandi
- Clytoctantes atrogularis
- Dysithamnus leucostictus
- Dysithamnus occidentalis
- Dysithamnus plumbeus
- Herpsilochmus axillaris
- Herpsilochmus pectoralis
- Herpsilochmus pileatus
- Hypocnemis ochrogyna
- Myrmoborus lugubris
- Myrmoborus melanurus
- Myrmotherula klagesi
- Myrmotherula minor
- Myrmotherula surinamensis
- Myrmotherula urosticta
- Percnostola arenarum
- Rhegmatorhina gymnops
- Thamnophilus tenuepunctatus
- Xenornis setifrons

===== Thraupidae =====
- Bangsia flavovirens
- Bangsia melanochlamys
- Certhidea olivacea
- Chlorochrysa nitidissima
- Conirostrum margaritae
- Conirostrum tamarugense
- Coryphaspiza melanotis
- Dacnis berlepschi
- Dacnis hartlaubi
- Geospiza acutirostris
- Geospiza conirostris
- Geospiza pallida
- Geospiza propinqua
- Geospiza psittacula
- Geospiza septentrionalis
- Microspingus cinereus
- Nesospiza acunhae
- Nesospiza questi
- Pinaroloxias inornata
- Poospiza baeri
- Poospiza goeringi
- Poospiza rufosuperciliaris
- Sericossypha albocristata
- Sporophila beltoni
- Sporophila cinnamomea
- Sporophila falcirostris
- Sporophila frontalis
- Sporophila nigrorufa
- Tangara argyrofenges
- Tangara fastuosa
- Tangara peruviana
- Tephrophilus wetmorei
- Wetmorethraupis sterrhopteron

===== Timaliidae =====
- Mixornis prillwitzi
- Spelaeornis badeigularis
- Spelaeornis longicaudatus
- Stachyris nonggangensis
- Stachyris oglei

===== Tityridae =====
- Onychorhynchus occidentalis
- Onychorhynchus swainsoni

===== Troglodytidae =====
- Hylorchilus navai
- Troglodytes tanneri

===== Turdidae =====
- Catharus bicknelli
- Cochoa azurea
- Cochoa beccarii
- Geokichla cinerea
- Myadestes obscurus
- Turdus celaenops
- Turdus feae
- Turdus lherminieri
- Turdus ludoviciae
- Zoothera turipavae

===== Tyrannidae =====
- Agriornis albicauda
- Alectrurus risora
- Alectrurus tricolor
- Aphanotriccus capitalis
- Attila torridus
- Cnipodectes superrufus
- Conopias cinchoneti
- Culicivora caudacuta
- Elaenia ridleyana
- Hemitriccus cinnamomeipectus
- Hemitriccus furcatus
- Hemitriccus kaempferi
- Hemitriccus mirandae
- Lathrotriccus griseipectus
- Myiopagis olallai
- Nesotriccus ridgwayi
- Phyllomyias weedeni
- Phylloscartes kronei
- Piprites pileata
- Platyrinchus leucoryphus
- Pyrocephalus nanus
- Xolmis dominicanus
- Zimmerius cinereicapilla
- Zimmerius villarejoi

===== Vangidae =====
- Calicalicus rufocarpalis
- Euryceros prevostii
- Newtonia fanovanae
- Oriolia bernieri
- Prionops alberti

===== Vireonidae =====
- Vireo atricapilla
- Vireo caribaeus

===== Zosteropidae =====
- Zosterops brunneus
- Zosterops feae
- Zosterops ficedulinus
- Zosterops flavus
- Zosterops griseovirescens
- Zosterops melanocephalus
- Zosterops modestus
- Zosterops mouroniensis
- Zosterops samoensis
- Zosterops splendidus
- Zosterops winifredae

==== Pelecaniformes ====
===== Ardeidae =====
- Agamia agami
- Egretta eulophotes
- Egretta vinaceigula

===== Balaenicipitidae =====
- Balaeniceps rex

===== Threskiornithidae =====
- Geronticus calvus

==== Phoenicopteriformes ====
===== Phoenicopteridae =====
- Phoenicoparrus andinus

==== Piciformes ====
===== Capitonidae =====
- Capito dayi
- Capito hypoleucus
- Capito quinticolor
- Capito wallacei

===== Galbulidae =====
- Galbula pastazae
- Jacamaralcyon tridactyla

===== Lybiidae =====
- Lybius chaplini

===== Picidae =====
- Celeus tinnunculus
- Chrysocolaptes strictus
- Colaptes fernandinae
- Dryocopus hodgei
- Hylatomus galeatus
- Mulleripicus fuliginosus
- Mulleripicus pulverulentus
- Picoides ramsayi
- Picumnus spilogaster

===== Ramphastidae =====
- Ramphastos culminatus
- Ramphastos tucanus
- Ramphastos vitellinus

==== Podicipediformes ====
===== Podicipedidae =====
- Podiceps auritus
- Tachybaptus pelzelnii

==== Procellariiformes ====
===== Diomedeidae =====
- Diomedea epomophora
- Diomedea exulans
- Phoebastria albatrus
- Thalassarche eremita
- Thalassarche impavida
- Thalassarche salvini

===== Hydrobatidae =====
- Hydrobates leucorhous
- Hydrobates matsudairae
- Hydrobates monteiroi

===== Procellariidae =====
- Ardenna bulleri
- Ardenna creatopus
- Procellaria aequinoctialis
- Procellaria conspicillata
- Procellaria parkinsoni
- Pterodroma arminjoniana
- Pterodroma axillaris
- Pterodroma brevipes
- Pterodroma cervicalis
- Pterodroma cookii
- Pterodroma defilippiana
- Pterodroma deserta
- Pterodroma externa
- Pterodroma leucoptera
- Pterodroma longirostris
- Pterodroma pycrofti
- Pterodroma sandwichensis
- Pterodroma solandri
- Puffinus heinrothi
- Puffinus yelkouan

==== Psittaciformes ====
===== Cacatuidae =====
- Cacatua moluccensis
- Cacatua ophthalmica

===== Psittacidae =====
- Agapornis nigrigenis
- Amazona agilis
- Amazona arausiaca
- Amazona barbadensis
- Amazona collaria
- Amazona guildingii
- Amazona pretrei
- Amazona rhodocorytha
- Amazona tucumana
- Amazona ventralis
- Amazona versicolor
- Anodorhynchus hyacinthinus
- Ara militaris
- Bolborhynchus ferrugineifrons
- Charmosyna palmarum
- Coracopsis barklyi
- Cyanoramphus forbesi
- Cyanoramphus unicolor
- Eos cyanogenia
- Eunymphicus cornutus
- Eunymphicus uvaeensis
- Forpus xanthops
- Guaruba guarouba
- Hapalopsittaca amazonina
- Hapalopsittaca pyrrhops
- Leptosittaca branickii
- Lorius garrulus
- Pionites xanthurus
- Pionus reichenowi
- Poicephalus robustus
- Primolius couloni
- Prioniturus mindorensis
- Prioniturus platenae
- Prosopeia splendens
- Psittacara chloropterus
- Psittacara euops
- Psittrichas fulgidus
- Pyrilia vulturina
- Pyrrhura albipectus
- Pyrrhura calliptera
- Pyrrhura cruentata
- Pyrrhura lepida
- Pyrrhura leucotis
- Pyrrhura perlata
- Pyrrhura snethlageae
- Tanygnathus gramineus
- Touit costaricensis
- Touit huetii
- Touit melanonotus
- Touit stictopterus
- Touit surdus
- Trichoglossus forsteni
- Trichoglossus rosenbergii
- Vini peruviana
- Vini stepheni

==== Sphenisciformes ====
===== Spheniscidae =====
- Eudyptes chrysocome
- Eudyptes chrysolophus
- Eudyptes pachyrhynchus
- Eudyptes robustus
- Spheniscus humboldti

==== Strigiformes ====
===== Strigidae =====
- Bubo philippensis
- Bubo scandiacus
- Glaucidium albertinum
- Glaucidium nubicola
- Megascops barbarus
- Nesasio solomonensis
- Ninox ios
- Ninox malaitae
- Ninox mindorensis
- Ninox natalis
- Ninox odiosa
- Ninox reyi
- Ninox roseoaxillaris
- Otus angelinae
- Otus beccarii
- Otus gurneyi
- Otus hartlaubi
- Otus mendeni
- Otus nigrorum
- Otus pembaensis
- Otus sagittatus
- Scotopelia ussheri

===== Tytonidae =====
- Tyto aurantia
- Tyto inexspectata
- Tyto nigrobrunnea
- Tyto soumagnei

==== Struthioniformes ====
===== Apterygidae =====
- Apteryx australis
- Apteryx haastii
- Apteryx mantelli
- Apteryx rowi

===== Struthionidae =====
- Struthio molybdophanes

===== Tinamidae =====
- Crypturellus kerriae
- Nothocercus nigrocapillus
- Nothoprocta taczanowskii
- Nothura minor
- Taoniscus nanus
- Tinamus osgoodi
- Tinamus tao

==== Suliformes ====
===== Fregatidae =====
- Fregata aquila

===== Phalacrocoracidae =====
- Phalacrocorax campbelli
- Phalacrocorax carunculatus
- Phalacrocorax chalconotus
- Phalacrocorax colensoi
- Phalacrocorax harrisi
- Phalacrocorax nigrogularis
- Phalacrocorax ranfurlyi

==== Trogoniformes ====
===== Trogonidae =====
- Apalharpactes reinwardtii

=== Cephalaspidomorphi ===
==== Petromyzontiformes ====
===== Petromyzontidae =====
- Entosphenus minimus
- Lampetra hubbsi
- Mordacia praecox

=== Chondrichthyes ===
==== Carcharhiniformes ====
===== Carcharhinidae =====
- Carcharhinus albimarginatus
- Carcharhinus falciformis
- Carcharhinus longimanus
- Carcharhinus obscurus
- Carcharhinus plumbeus
- Carcharhinus signatus
- Negaprion acutidens

===== Hemigaleidae =====
- Chaenogaleus macrostoma
- Hemigaleus microstoma
- Hemipristis elongata

===== Pentanchidae =====
- Galeus mincaronei
- Halaelurus boesemani

===== Scyliorhinidae =====
- Atelomycterus baliensis
- Aulohalaelurus kanakorum
- Haploblepharus fuscus
- Schroederichthys saurisqualus

===== Sphyrnidae =====
- Sphyrna tudes
- Sphyrna zygaena

===== Triakidae =====
- Galeorhinus galeus
- Mustelus mustelus
- Mustelus whitneyi
- Scylliogaleus quecketti
- Triakis maculata

==== Chimaeriformes ====
===== Chimaeridae =====
- Hydrolagus ogilbyi

==== Lamniformes ====
===== Alopiidae =====
- Alopias pelagicus
- Alopias superciliosus
- Alopias vulpinus

===== Cetorhinidae =====
- Cetorhinus maximus

===== Lamnidae =====
- Carcharodon carcharias
- Isurus oxyrinchus
- Isurus paucus
- Lamna nasus

===== Odontaspididae =====
- Carcharias taurus
- Odontaspis ferox

==== Myliobatiformes ====
===== Aetobatidae =====
- Aetobatus ocellatus

===== Dasyatidae =====
- Fontitrygon colarensis
- Fontitrygon garouaensis
- Hemitrygon fluviorum
- Himantura leoparda
- Himantura uarnak
- Himantura undulata
- Maculabatis gerrardi
- Maculabatis pastinacoides
- Pateobatis fai
- Pateobatis hortlei
- Pateobatis jenkinsii
- Pateobatis uarnacoides
- Taeniurops meyeni
- Urogymnus asperrimus
- Urogymnus granulatus
- Urogymnus lobistomus

===== Myliobatidae =====
- Aetomylaeus nichofii

==== Orectolobiformes ====
===== Brachaeluridae =====
- Brachaelurus colcloughi

===== Ginglymostomatidae =====
- Nebrius ferrugineus
- Pseudoginglymostoma brevicaudatum

===== Hemiscylliidae =====
- Hemiscyllium hallstromi
- Hemiscyllium strahani

==== Rajiformes ====
===== Arhynchobatidae =====
- Atlantoraja cyclophora
- Atlantoraja platana
- Rhinoraja albomaculata
- Rioraja agassizii
- Sympterygia acuta

===== Gymnuridae =====
- Gymnura altavela
- Gymnura zonura

===== Mobulidae =====
- Mobula alfredi
- Mobula birostris
- Mobula rochebrunei
- Mobula tarapacana

===== Narcinidae =====
- Benthobatis kreffti
- Benthobatis yangi
- Diplobatis colombiensis
- Diplobatis guamachensis
- Diplobatis ommata
- Diplobatis pictus
- Narcine brevilabiata

===== Narkidae =====
- Heteronarce garmani
- Narke japonica
- Temera hardwickii

===== Platyrhinidae =====
- Platyrhina sinensis

===== Rajidae =====
- Amblyraja radiata
- Beringraja pulchra
- Dipturus australis
- Dipturus crosnieri
- Dipturus mennii
- Dipturus trachydermus
- Gurgesiella dorsalifera
- Leucoraja fullonica
- Raja maderensis
- Spiniraja whitleyi
- Zearaja chilensis

===== Rhinopteridae =====
- Rhinoptera javanica

===== Urolophidae =====
- Urolophus bucculentus
- Urolophus sufflavus
- Urolophus viridis

===== Urotrygonidae =====
- Urotrygon reticulata
- Urotrygon simulatrix

==== Rhinopristiformes ====
===== Glaucostegidae =====
- Glaucostegus granulatus
- Glaucostegus halavi
- Glaucostegus obtusus
- Glaucostegus thouin
- Glaucostegus typus

===== Rhinidae =====
- Rhina ancylostoma
- Rhynchobatus australiae
- Rhynchobatus cooki
- Rhynchobatus djiddensis
- Rhynchobatus laevis
- Rhynchobatus springeri

===== Rhinobatidae =====
- Rhinobatos albomaculatus
- Rhinobatos irvinei
- Rhinobatos jimbaranensis
- Rhinobatos penggali

===== Trygonorrhinidae =====
- Aptychotrema timorensis
- Zapteryx brevirostris

==== Squaliformes ====
===== Centrophoridae =====
- Centrophorus lusitanicus
- Centrophorus squamosus

===== Oxynotidae =====
- Oxynotus centrina

===== Squalidae =====
- Squalus acanthias
- Squalus montalbani

==== Squatiniformes ====
===== Squatinidae =====
- Squatina albipunctata
- Squatina japonica
- Squatina nebulosa
- Squatina tergocellatoides

=== Mammalia ===
==== Afrosoricida ====
===== Chrysochloridae =====
- Amblysomus robustus
- Carpitalpa arendsi
- Chlorotalpa duthieae
- Chrysospalax villosus

===== Tenrecidae =====
- Limnogale mergulus
- Microgale dryas
- Microgale monticola
- Microgale nasoloi

==== Carnivora ====
===== Eupleridae =====
- Cryptoprocta ferox
- Eupleres goudotii
- Fossa fossana
- Galidictis fasciata
- Salanoia concolor

===== Felidae =====
- Acinonyx jubatus
- Caracal aurata
- Felis bieti
- Felis nigripes
- Leopardus guigna
- Leopardus guttulus
- Leopardus tigrinus
- Neofelis diardi
- Neofelis nebulosa
- Panthera leo
- Panthera pardus
- Panthera uncia
- Prionailurus viverrinus

===== Herpestidae =====
- Bdeogale omnivora
- Liberiictis kuhni

===== Mephitidae =====
- Spilogale putorius
- Spilogale pygmaea

===== Mustelidae =====
- Aonyx cinereus
- Arctonyx collaris
- Lutrogale perspicillata
- Martes gwatkinsii
- Mustela felipei
- Vormela peregusna

===== Odobenidae =====
- Odobenus rosmarus

===== Otariidae =====
- Callorhinus ursinus

===== Phocidae =====
- Cystophora cristata

===== Ursidae =====
- Ailuropoda melanoleuca
- Helarctos malayanus
- Melursus ursinus
- Tremarctos ornatus
- Ursus maritimus
- Ursus thibetanus

===== Viverridae =====
- Arctictis binturong
- Diplogale hosei
- Genetta bourloni
- Genetta cristata
- Macrogalidia musschenbroekii
- Poiana leightoni

==== Cetartiodactyla ====
===== Bovidae =====
- Ammodorcas clarkei
- Ammotragus lervia
- Bison bonasus
- Bos gaurus
- Bos mutus
- Budorcas taxicolor
- Capra aegagrus
- Capra nubiana
- Capricornis sumatraensis
- Cephalophus adersi
- Cephalophus zebra
- Dorcatragus megalotis
- Eudorcas rufifrons
- Gazella arabica
- Gazella cuvieri
- Gazella dorcas
- Gazella marica
- Gazella subgutturosa
- Naemorhedus baileyi
- Naemorhedus caudatus
- Naemorhedus griseus
- Nanger soemmerringii
- Oryx leucoryx
- Ovis orientalis orientalis
- Ovis orientalis vignei
- Tetracerus quadricornis
- Tragelaphus derbianus

===== Cervidae =====
- Blastocerus dichotomus
- Cervus albirostris
- Hippocamelus antisensis
- Hydropotes inermis
- Mazama bororo
- Mazama bricenii
- Mazama chunyi
- Mazama nana
- Mazama pandora
- Mazama rufina
- Muntiacus crinifrons
- Pudu mephistophiles
- Rangifer tarandus
- Rucervus duvaucelii
- Rusa marianna
- Rusa timorensis
- Rusa unicolor

===== Delphinidae =====
- Orcaella heinsohni
- Sousa chinensis
- Sousa sahulensis

===== Giraffidae =====
- Giraffa camelopardalis

===== Hippopotamidae =====
- Hippopotamus amphibius

===== Moschidae =====
- Moschus moschiferus

===== Phocoenidae =====
- Neophocaena phocaenoides

===== Physeteridae =====
- Physeter macrocephalus

===== Pontoporiidae =====
- Pontoporia blainvillei

===== Suidae =====
- Babyrousa babyrussa
- Babyrousa celebensis
- Sus barbatus
- Sus oliveri
- Sus philippensis

===== Tayassuidae =====
- Tayassu pecari

==== Chiroptera ====
===== Craseonycteridae =====
- Craseonycteris thonglongyai

===== Emballonuridae =====
- Balantiopteryx infusca
- Balantiopteryx io
- Taphozous hildegardeae

===== Furipteridae =====
- Amorphochilus schnablii

===== Hipposideridae =====
- Coelops robinsoni
- Hipposideros curtus
- Hipposideros demissus
- Hipposideros durgadasi
- Hipposideros edwardshilli
- Hipposideros halophyllus
- Hipposideros inornatus
- Hipposideros khaokhouayensis
- Hipposideros marisae
- Hipposideros orbiculus
- Hipposideros ridleyi
- Hipposideros scutinares
- Hipposideros sorenseni
- Paratriaenops auritus

===== Megadermatidae =====
- Macroderma gigas

===== Molossidae =====
- Chaerephon johorensis
- Eumops floridanus
- Mormopterus minutus
- Mormopterus norfolkensis
- Mormopterus phrudus
- Otomops harrisoni

===== Mystacinidae =====
- Mystacina tuberculata

===== Natalidae =====
- Natalus primus

===== Nycteridae =====
- Nycteris javanica

===== Phyllostomidae =====
- Choeroniscus periosus
- Leptonycteris curasoae
- Lonchorhina marinkellei
- Lonchorhina orinocensis
- Musonycteris harrisoni
- Platyrrhinus chocoensis
- Vampyressa melissa

===== Pteropodidae =====
- Acerodon celebensis
- Acerodon leucotis
- Acerodon mackloti
- Dobsonia emersa
- Dyacopterus brooksi
- Eidolon dupreanum
- Harpyionycteris celebensis
- Megaerops kusnotoi
- Notopteris macdonaldi
- Notopteris neocaledonica
- Nyctimene keasti
- Nyctimene minutus
- Ptenochirus wetmorei
- Pteralopex taki
- Pteropus aldabrensis
- Pteropus anetianus
- Pteropus caniceps
- Pteropus chrysoproctus
- Pteropus cognatus
- Pteropus dasymallus
- Pteropus faunulus
- Pteropus lylei
- Pteropus melanotus
- Pteropus molossinus
- Pteropus ocularis
- Pteropus ornatus
- Pteropus pohlei
- Pteropus poliocephalus
- Pteropus rufus
- Pteropus temminckii
- Pteropus ualanus
- Pteropus vetulus
- Pteropus voeltzkowi
- Rousettus bidens
- Rousettus obliviosus
- Rousettus spinalatus
- Syconycteris carolinae

===== Rhinolophidae =====
- Rhinolophus canuti
- Rhinolophus cohenae
- Rhinolophus guineensis
- Rhinolophus madurensis
- Rhinolophus mehelyi
- Rhinolophus ruwenzorii

===== Vespertilionidae =====
- Arielulus cuprosus
- Arielulus societatis
- Chalinolobus tuberculatus
- Hesperoptenus tomesi
- Kerivoula flora
- Lasiurus degelidus
- Lasiurus insularis
- Lasiurus minor
- Murina aenea
- Murina rozendaali
- Myotis capaccinii
- Myotis dominicensis
- Myotis nyctor
- Myotis scotti
- Myotis sicarius
- Myotis vivesi
- Nyctalus azoreum
- Nyctalus furvus
- Nyctalus lasiopterus
- Pipistrellus maderensis
- Plecotus sardus
- Plecotus teneriffae
- Rhogeessa minutilla
- Rhogeessa mira

==== Cingulata ====
===== Chlamyphoridae =====
- Priodontes maximus
- Tolypeutes tricinctus

==== Dasyuromorphia ====
===== Dasyuridae =====
- Antechinus bellus
- Dasyuroides byrnei
- Phascogale pirata
- Sminthopsis butleri
- Sminthopsis psammophila

==== Didelphimorphia ====
===== Didelphidae =====
- Marmosa phaea
- Marmosa xerophila
- Marmosops juninensis
- Marmosops pakaraimae
- Monodelphis reigi
- Thylamys karimii

==== Diprotodontia ====
===== Macropodidae =====
- Dendrolagus dorianus
- Dendrolagus inustus
- Dendrolagus spadix
- Dendrolagus stellarum
- Dendrolagus ursinus
- Dorcopsis luctuosa
- Lagorchestes hirsutus
- Lagostrophus fasciatus
- Onychogalea fraenata
- Petrogale lateralis
- Petrogale penicillata
- Petrogale sharmani
- Setonix brachyurus
- Thylogale browni
- Thylogale brunii

===== Phalangeridae =====
- Ailurops ursinus
- Phalanger matabiru
- Spilocuscus papuensis
- Strigocuscus celebensis

===== Phascolarctidae =====
- Phascolarctos cinereus

===== Potoroidae =====
- Potorous longipes

===== Pseudocheiridae =====
- Petauroides volans
- Pseudochirops coronatus
- Pseudochirulus schlegeli

==== Eulipotyphla ====
===== Erinaceidae =====
- Hylomys parvus

===== Soricidae =====
- Crocidura allex
- Crocidura eisentrauti
- Crocidura hispida
- Crocidura lanosa
- Crocidura lucina
- Crocidura manengubae
- Crocidura telfordi
- Crocidura usambarae
- Crocidura zimmermanni
- Cryptotis gracilis
- Cryptotis magna
- Cryptotis meridensis
- Cryptotis phillipsii
- Myosorex bururiensis
- Myosorex jejei
- Myosorex longicaudatus
- Myosorex okuensis
- Notiosorex villai
- Ruwenzorisorex suncoides
- Sorex macrodon
- Sorex milleri
- Suncus montanus
- Sylvisorex camerunensis
- Sylvisorex lunaris

===== Talpidae =====
- Galemys pyrenaicus
- Mogera uchidai

==== Lagomorpha ====
===== Leporidae =====
- Lepus castroviejoi
- Lepus corsicanus
- Nesolagus netscheri
- Sylvilagus dicei
- Sylvilagus transitionalis

==== Macroscelidea ====
===== Macroscelididae =====
- Rhynchocyon udzungwensis

==== Monotremata ====
===== Tachyglossidae =====
- Zaglossus bartoni

==== Paucituberculata ====
===== Caenolestidae =====
- Caenolestes condorensis
- Caenolestes convelatus
- Caenolestes sangay

==== Peramelemorphia ====
===== Peramelidae =====
- Isoodon auratus
- Perameles bougainville
- Perameles gunnii

===== Thylacomyidae =====
- Macrotis lagotis

==== Perissodactyla ====
===== Equidae =====
- Equus zebra

===== Rhinocerotidae =====
- Rhinoceros unicornis

===== Tapiridae =====
- Tapirus terrestris

==== Pholidota ====
===== Manidae =====
- Phataginus tetradactyla
- Phataginus tricuspis
- Smutsia gigantea
- Smutsia temminckii

==== Pilosa ====
===== Bradypodidae =====
- Bradypus torquatus

===== Myrmecophagidae =====
- Myrmecophaga tridactyla

==== Primates ====
===== Aotidae =====
- Aotus brumbacki
- Aotus griseimembra
- Aotus lemurinus
- Aotus miconax
- Aotus nancymaae

===== Atelidae =====
- Alouatta belzebul
- Alouatta discolor
- Ateles paniscus
- Lagothrix lagotricha
- Lagothrix poeppigii

===== Callitrichidae =====
- Callibella humilis
- Callimico goeldii
- Callithrix aurita
- Mico leucippe
- Mico rondoni
- Saguinus niger

===== Cebidae =====
- Saimiri oerstedii
- Saimiri vanzolinii

===== Cercopithecidae =====
- Allochrocebus lhoesti
- Allochrocebus solatus
- Cercocebus torquatus
- Cercopithecus diana
- Cercopithecus erythrogaster
- Cercopithecus erythrotis
- Cercopithecus hamlyni
- Cercopithecus sclateri
- Chlorocebus djamdjamensis
- Colobus polykomos
- Colobus satanas
- Colobus vellerosus
- Macaca arctoides
- Macaca hecki
- Macaca leonina
- Macaca nemestrina
- Macaca nigrescens
- Macaca ochreata
- Macaca siberu
- Macaca tonkeana
- Mandrillus sphinx
- Presbytis frontata
- Presbytis hosei
- Presbytis natunae
- Presbytis thomasi
- Semnopithecus hypoleucos
- Trachypithecus auratus
- Trachypithecus johnii
- Trachypithecus laotum
- Trachypithecus pileatus

===== Cheirogaleidae =====
- Allocebus trichotis
- Microcebus lehilahytsara
- Microcebus myoxinus
- Microcebus rufus
- Microcebus tavaratra
- Phaner furcifer

===== Hylobatidae =====
- Hoolock leuconedys

===== Indriidae =====
- Avahi laniger
- Avahi peyrierasi
- Avahi ramanantsoavanai

===== Lemuridae =====
- Eulemur macaco
- Eulemur rubriventer
- Eulemur rufus
- Hapalemur griseus
- Hapalemur meridionalis
- Hapalemur occidentalis

===== Lepilemuridae =====
- Lepilemur aeeclis
- Lepilemur dorsalis
- Lepilemur petteri
- Lepilemur ruficaudatus
- Lepilemur seali

===== Lorisidae =====
- Nycticebus bengalensis
- Nycticebus coucang
- Nycticebus menagensis
- Nycticebus pygmaeus

===== Pitheciidae =====
- Cacajao calvus
- Cacajao hosomi
- Callicebus melanochir
- Callicebus personatus
- Cheracebus medemi
- Pithecia albicans
- Plecturocebus ornatus

===== Tarsiidae =====
- Tarsius bancanus
- Tarsius dentatus
- Tarsius tarsier

==== Proboscidea ====
===== Elephantidae =====
- Loxodonta africana

==== Rodentia ====
===== Bathyergidae =====
- Fukomys kafuensis

===== Capromyidae =====
- Geocapromys ingrahami
- Mysateles melanurus

===== Cricetidae =====
- Aegialomys galapagoensis
- Aepeomys reigi
- Akodon surdus
- Alticola montosa
- Arvicola sapidus
- Bibimys torresi
- Dinaromys bogdanovi
- Geoxus annectens
- Handleyomys rhabdops
- Ichthyomys pittieri
- Juliomys rimofrons
- Mesocricetus auratus
- Microtus breweri
- Neomicroxus latebricola
- Neotoma palatina
- Nesoryzomys fernandinae
- Nesoryzomys narboroughi
- Nesoryzomys swarthi
- Neusticomys mussoi
- Neusticomys venezuelae
- Oxymycterus wayku
- Peromyscus simulus
- Peromyscus zarhynchus
- Phaenomys ferrugineus
- Podomys floridanus
- Podoxymys roraimae
- Proedromys bedfordi
- Punomys kofordi
- Punomys lemminus
- Reithrodontomys hirsutus
- Reithrodontomys tenuirostris
- Sigmodon alleni
- Sigmodon inopinatus
- Thomasomys apeco
- Thomasomys bombycinus
- Thomasomys eleusis
- Thomasomys macrotis
- Thomasomys onkiro
- Thomasomys pyrrhonotus
- Thomasomys ucucha

===== Ctenomyidae =====
- Ctenomys azarae
- Ctenomys bergi
- Ctenomys lami
- Ctenomys latro
- Ctenomys magellanicus
- Ctenomys pundti

===== Dasyproctidae =====
- Dasyprocta coibae

===== Dipodidae =====
- Sicista caucasica
- Sicista loriger

===== Erethizontidae =====
- Chaetomys subspinosus

===== Gliridae =====
- Dryomys niethammeri
- Myomimus roachi

===== Heteromyidae =====
- Dipodomys elator
- Dipodomys nitratoides
- Heteromys teleus
- Perognathus alticola

===== Hystricidae =====
- Hystrix pumila

===== Muridae =====
- Apomys camiguinensis
- Archboldomys luzonensis
- Bullimus gamay
- Bunomys fratrorum
- Chiropodomys karlkoopmani
- Conilurus penicillatus
- Crunomys melanius
- Desmomys yaldeni
- Echiothrix centrosa
- Eropeplus canus
- Gerbillus hoogstraali
- Grammomys minnae
- Haeromys minahassae
- Haeromys pusillus
- Hapalomys delacouri
- Hybomys lunaris
- Kadarsanomys sodyi
- Komodomys rintjanus
- Lemniscomys mittendorfi
- Leopoldamys siporanus
- Lophuromys medicaudatus
- Lophuromys melanonyx
- Margaretamys beccarii
- Maxomys inflatus
- Maxomys pagensis
- Maxomys rajah
- Maxomys whiteheadi
- Meriones sacramenti
- Mesembriomys gouldii
- Mus mayori
- Niviventer cameroni
- Notomys fuscus
- Otomys lacustris
- Otomys occidentalis
- Phloeomys cumingi
- Pithecheir melanurus
- Praomys degraaffi
- Praomys hartwigi
- Pseudomys australis
- Pseudomys calabyi
- Pseudomys fieldi
- Pseudomys fumeus
- Pseudomys novaehollandiae
- Pseudomys oralis
- Rattus hoogerwerfi
- Rattus lugens
- Rattus mollicomulus
- Rattus nikenii
- Rattus palmarum
- Rattus richardsoni
- Rattus satarae
- Rattus stoicus
- Rhynchomys isarogensis
- Srilankamys ohiensis
- Taeromys taerae
- Tarsomys echinatus
- Thamnomys kempi
- Xeromys myoides
- Zyzomys maini

===== Nesomyidae =====
- Brachytarsomys villosa
- Delanymys brooksi

===== Octodontidae =====
- Octodon bridgesi

===== Platacanthomyidae =====
- Platacanthomys lasiurus

===== Sciuridae =====
- Callosciurus melanogaster
- Funambulus layardi
- Funambulus sublineatus
- Hyosciurus ileile
- Marmota menzbieri
- Neotamias bulleri
- Petinomys genibarbis
- Petinomys lugens
- Petinomys setosus
- Petinomys vordermanni
- Rheithrosciurus macrotis
- Rubrisciurus rubriventer
- Spermophilus citellus
- Sundasciurus fraterculus
- Urocitellus endemicus
- Urocitellus townsendii

===== Spalacidae =====
- Spalax zemni

==== Scandentia ====
===== Tupaiidae =====
- Tupaia chrysogaster

==== Sirenia ====
===== Dugongidae =====
- Dugong dugon

===== Trichechidae =====
- Trichechus inunguis
- Trichechus manatus
- Trichechus senegalensis

=== Myxini ===
==== Myxiniformes ====
===== Myxinidae =====
- Eptatretus longipinnis
- Myxine garmani
- Myxine sotoi
- Paramyxine cheni
- Paramyxine fernholmi
- Paramyxine nelsoni

=== Reptilia ===
==== Crocodylia ====
===== Crocodylidae =====
- Crocodylus acutus
- Crocodylus palustris
- Osteolaemus tetraspis
- Tomistoma schlegelii

==== Rhynchocephalia ====
===== Sphenodontidae =====
- Sphenodon guntheri

==== Squamata ====
===== Agamidae =====
- Agama montana
- Bronchocela smaragdina
- Ceratophora aspera
- Ctenophorus nguyarna
- Diporiphora vescus
- Draco mindanensis
- Hydrosaurus pustulatus
- Phrynocephalus persicus
- Phrynocephalus saidalievi
- Phrynocephalus strauchi
- Trapelus savignii
- Uromastyx aegyptia
- Uromastyx thomasi

===== Amphisbaenidae =====
- Amphisbaena innocens
- Cynisca leonina
- Cynisca nigeriensis

===== Anguidae =====
- Abronia anzuetoi
- Abronia mixteca
- Abronia oaxacae
- Abronia taeniata
- Abronia vasconcelosii
- Celestus fowleri
- Celestus warreni
- Elgaria panamintina
- Ophisaurus hainanensis

===== Boidae =====
- Chilabothrus exsul
- Chilabothrus subflavus

===== Calamariidae =====
- Pseudorabdion mcnamarae
- Pseudorabdion talonuran

===== Carphodactylidae =====
- Orraya occultus
- Phyllurus isis

===== Chamaeleonidae =====
- Bradypodion kentanicum
- Bradypodion melanocephalum
- Bradypodion pumilum
- Bradypodion thamnobates
- Brookesia ebenaui
- Brookesia tuberculata
- Brookesia vadoni
- Calumma capuroni
- Calumma cucullatum
- Calumma jejy
- Calumma oshaughnessyi
- Calumma peyrierasi
- Calumma tsaratananense
- Calumma tsycorne
- Furcifer antimena
- Furcifer campani
- Furcifer labordi
- Furcifer petteri
- Furcifer rhinoceratus
- Kinyongia excubitor
- Palleon nasus
- Rhampholeon beraduccii
- Rhampholeon marshalli
- Rhampholeon nebulauctor
- Trioceros quadricornis
- Trioceros serratus

===== Colubridae =====
- Dryocalamus philippinus
- Dryophiops philippina
- Leptophis modestus
- Lycodon paucifasciatus
- Oligodon brevicauda
- Oligodon juglandifer
- Oligodon lacroixi
- Oligodon modestum
- Oligodon pulcherrimus
- Orthriophis moellendorfi
- Tantilla boipiranga
- Tantilla jani
- Tantilla psittaca
- Tetralepis fruhstorferi
- Thelotornis usambaricus

===== Cordylidae =====
- Cordylus nebulosus
- Hemicordylus nebulosus
- Platysaurus imperator
- Smaug giganteus

===== Crotaphytidae =====
- Crotaphytus reticulatus

===== Dactyloidae =====
- Anolis barkeri
- Anolis longiceps
- Anolis maculigula
- Anolis muralla
- Anolis naufragus
- Anolis pinchoti
- Anolis pogus

===== Diplodactylidae =====
- Correlophus ciliatus
- Correlophus sarasinorum
- Diplodactylus fulleri
- Diplodactylus polyophthalmus
- Mniarogekko chahoua
- Strophurus horneri
- Toropuku stephensi

===== Dipsadidae =====
- Adelphicos veraepacis
- Alsophis rufiventris
- Atractus microrhynchus
- Atractus modestus
- Atractus nicefori
- Atractus paucidens
- Atractus roulei
- Calamodontophis paucidens
- Coniophanes dromiciformis
- Dipsas elegans
- Erythrolamprus atraventer
- Geophis juliai
- Geophis nephodrymus
- Haitiophis anomalus
- Heterodon simus
- Hypsirhynchus scalaris
- Ialtris haetianus
- Omoadiphas aurula
- Philodryas livida
- Rhadinaea fulvivittis
- Rhadinella montecristi
- Rhadinella pegosalyta
- Tantalophis discolor

===== Elapidae =====
- Acanthophis cryptamydros
- Acanthophis hawkei
- Bungarus andamanensis
- Bungarus slowinskii
- Hoplocephalus bungaroides
- Hydrophis semperi
- Laticauda crockeri
- Laticauda schistorhynchus
- Loveridgelaps elapoides
- Micrurus ephippifer
- Naja atra
- Naja mandalayensis
- Naja siamensis
- Ophiophagus hannah
- Toxicocalamus longissimus

===== Eublepharidae =====
- Goniurosaurus kuroiwae

===== Gekkonidae =====
- Ailuronyx trachygaster
- Alsophylax loricatus
- Alsophylax szczerbaki
- Blaesodactylus boivini
- Christinus guentheri
- Cnemaspis elgonensis
- Cnemaspis indica
- Cnemaspis indraneildasii
- Cnemaspis jerdonii
- Cnemaspis otai
- Cyrtodactylus cavernicolus
- Cyrtodactylus hidupselamanya
- Gekko ernstkelleri
- Gekko gigante
- Gekko shibatai
- Gekko swinhonis
- Hemidactylus albofasciatus
- Hemidactylus gujaratensis
- Hemidactylus sataraensis
- Homopholis mulleri
- Lepidodactylus gardineri
- Lepidodactylus manni
- Lygodactylus bivittis
- Lygodactylus blanci
- Lygodactylus gravis
- Lygodactylus madagascariensis
- Lygodactylus methueni
- Matoatoa brevipes
- Nactus coindemirensis
- Nactus serpensinsula
- Paragehyra petiti
- Paroedura androyensis
- Paroedura vazimba
- Perochirus ateles
- Phelsuma breviceps
- Phelsuma hielscheri
- Phelsuma nigristriata
- Phelsuma standingi
- Pseudogekko brevipes
- Uroplatus ebenaui
- Uroplatus giganteus
- Uroplatus henkeli
- Uroplatus malama

===== Gerrhosauridae =====
- Tetradactylus breyeri
- Tetradactylus fitzsimonsi
- Tracheloptychus petersi
- Zonosaurus anelanelany
- Zonosaurus boettgeri
- Zonosaurus maximus
- Zonosaurus quadrilineatus

===== Gymnophthalmidae =====
- Anadia antioquensis
- Bachia bresslaui
- Potamites ocellatus
- Psilophthalmus paeminosus
- Ptychoglossus bicolor
- Riama anatoloros
- Riama aurea
- Riama laevis
- Riama stigmatoral
- Teuchocercus keyi

===== Homalopsidae =====
- Enhydris longicauda

===== Hoplocercidae =====
- Enyalioides oshaughnessyi
- Morunasaurus annularis

===== Iguanidae =====
- Amblyrhynchus cristatus
- Conolophus pallidus
- Conolophus subcristatus
- Ctenosaura clarki
- Ctenosaura defensor
- Ctenosaura nolascensis
- Cyclura cornuta
- Cyclura cychlura
- Cyclura nubila

===== Lacertidae =====
- Acanthodactylus felicis
- Acanthodactylus pardalis
- Darevskia alpina
- Dinarolacerta mosorensis
- Iberolacerta monticola
- Podarcis gaigeae
- Podarcis levendis
- Podarcis milensis

===== Lamprophiidae =====
- Lycophidion nanus

===== Leiosauridae =====
- Anisolepis longicauda
- Anisolepis undulatus

===== Liolaemidae =====
- Ctenoblepharys adspersa
- Liolaemus audituvelatus
- Liolaemus dicktracyi
- Liolaemus famatinae
- Liolaemus frassinettii
- Liolaemus halonastes
- Liolaemus hellmichi
- Liolaemus lutzae
- Liolaemus martorii
- Liolaemus morenoi
- Liolaemus occipitalis
- Liolaemus tandiliensis
- Liolaemus thermarum
- Liolaemus tregenzai
- Liolaemus variegatus
- Liolaemus villaricensis
- Phymaturus mallimaccii
- Phymaturus vociferator

===== Natricidae =====
- Adelophis copei
- Hebius miyajimae
- Natrix megalocephala
- Storeria hidalgoensis
- Thamnophis gigas
- Thamnophis scaliger
- Tropidonophis negrosensis

===== Phrynosomatidae =====
- Sceloporus arenicolus
- Sceloporus maculosus
- Sceloporus megalepidurus
- Sceloporus oberon
- Urosaurus clarionensis
- Uta encantadae
- Uta lowei
- Uta palmeri
- Uta tumidarostra

===== Phyllodactylidae =====
- Asaccus montanus
- Phyllodactylus insularis
- Phyllodactylus leoni
- Phyllodactylus lepidopygus
- Tarentola boavistensis
- Tarentola chazaliae

===== Polychrotidae =====
- Polychrus peruvianus

===== Psammophiidae =====
- Psammophis leightoni

===== Pseudoxyrhophiidae =====
- Brygophis coulangesi
- Buhoma procterae
- Compsophis zeny
- Liophidium therezieni
- Liopholidophis grandidieri
- Lycodryas citrinus
- Lycodryas inornatus
- Pararhadinaea melanogaster
- Pseudoxyrhopus oblectator
- Pseudoxyrhopus sokosoko
- Thamnosophis stumpffi

===== Pygopodidae =====
- Aprasia rostrata

===== Pythonidae =====
- Python bivittatus
- Python kyaiktiyo
- Simalia oenpelliensis

===== Scincidae =====
- Amphiglossus alluaudi
- Amphiglossus anosyensis
- Amphiglossus ardouini
- Amphiglossus mandokava
- Amphiglossus splendidus
- Aspronema cochabambae
- Caledoniscincus terma
- Carlia wundalthini
- Chalcides guentheri
- Chalcides manueli
- Chalcides minutus
- Concinnia frerei
- Cryptoblepharus gloriosus
- Ctenotus ora
- Dasia griffini
- Emoia erronan
- Emoia loyaltiensis
- Emoia parkeri
- Emoia tuitarere
- Eutropis ashwamedhi
- Graciliscincus shonae
- Kaestlea laterimaculata
- Lacertoides pardalis
- Leiolopisma telfairii
- Leptosiaphos meleagris
- Lerista chordae
- Lerista christinae
- Lerista rochfordensis
- Liopholis kintorei
- Liopholis slateri
- Madascincus nanus
- Marisora aurulae
- Marmorosphax boulinda
- Marmorosphax montana
- Nannoscincus gracilis
- Nannoscincus mariei
- Nannoscincus rankini
- Niveoscincus greeni
- Niveoscincus microlepidotus
- Niveoscincus orocryptus
- Niveoscincus palfreymani
- Oligosoma alani
- Oligosoma fallai
- Oligosoma grande
- Oligosoma homalonotum
- Oligosoma lichenigera
- Oligosoma macgregori
- Oligosoma microlepis
- Oligosoma striatum
- Oligosoma waimatense
- Oligosoma whitakeri
- Panaspis africanus
- Paracontias kankana
- Parvoscincus sisoni
- Plestiodon barbouri
- Plestiodon dugesii
- Plestiodon kishinouyei
- Plestiodon kuchinoshimensis
- Plestiodon reynoldsi
- Pseudoacontias unicolor
- Saproscincus saltus
- Scelotes bourquini
- Sigaloseps ruficauda
- Simiscincus aurantiacus
- Sphenomorphus knollmanae
- Techmarscincus jigurru
- Trachylepis dumasi
- Trachylepis lavarambo
- Trachylepis loluiensis
- Trachylepis tavaratra
- Trachylepis wrightii
- Tropidoscincus aubrianus

===== Sphaerodactylidae =====
- Aristelliger hechti
- Gonatodes astralis
- Lepidoblepharis grandis
- Saurodactylus fasciatus
- Sphaerodactylus callocricus
- Sphaerodactylus cinereus
- Sphaerodactylus kirbyi
- Sphaerodactylus streptophorus

===== Teiidae =====
- Aspidoscelis catalinensis
- Aspidoscelis gypsi
- Aspidoscelis labialis
- Aspidoscelis martyris
- Contomastix vittata
- Pholidoscelis wetmorei

===== Tropidophiidae =====
- Exiliboa placata

===== Tropiduridae =====
- Leiocephalus greenwayi
- Leiocephalus psammodromus
- Stenocercus chinchaoensis
- Stenocercus festae
- Stenocercus torquatus
- Tropidurus xanthochilus

===== Typhlopidae =====
- Amerotyphlops stadelmani
- Amerotyphlops tycherus
- Typhlops eperopeus
- Typhlops hectus
- Typhlops naugus

===== Uropeltidae =====
- Melanophidium bilineatum
- Uropeltis phipsonii

===== Varanidae =====
- Varanus komodoensis
- Varanus olivaceus

===== Viperidae =====
- Atheris barbouri
- Atheris ceratophora
- Bitis armata
- Bitis schneideri
- Bothriechis aurifer
- Bothriechis rowleyi
- Bothrops pirajai
- Crotalus stejnegeri
- Cryptelytrops honsonensis
- Cryptelytrops rubeus
- Gloydius shedaoensis
- Montivipera albicornuta
- Ophryacus undulatus
- Popeia nebularis
- Vipera dinniki
- Vipera ebneri
- Vipera eriwanensis
- Vipera latastei
- Vipera ursinii

===== Xantusiidae =====
- Lepidophyma gaigeae
- Lepidophyma micropholis
- Xantusia gracilis

===== Xenodermatidae =====
- Achalinus hainanus

===== Xenosauridae =====
- Xenosaurus grandis

==== Testudines ====
===== Carettochelyidae =====
- Carettochelys insculpta

===== Chelidae =====
- Chelodina parkeri
- Elseya branderhorsti
- Hydromedusa maximiliani
- Mesoclemmys zuliae
- Rheodytes leukops

===== Cheloniidae =====
- Caretta caretta
- Lepidochelys olivacea

===== Chelydridae =====
- Chelydra rossignonii
- Macrochelys temminckii

===== Dermochelyidae =====
- Dermochelys coriacea

===== Emydidae =====
- Actinemys marmorata
- Graptemys barbouri
- Graptemys flavimaculata
- Graptemys oculifera
- Terrapene carolina
- Trachemys decorata
- Trachemys gaigeae
- Trachemys ornata
- Trachemys terrapen
- Trachemys yaquia

===== Geoemydidae =====
- Cuora amboinensis
- Geoclemys hamiltonii
- Hardella thurjii
- Heosemys grandis
- Malayemys subtrijuga
- Melanochelys tricarinata
- Morenia ocellata
- Morenia petersi
- Notochelys platynota
- Siebenrockiella crassicollis

===== Kinosternidae =====
- Kinosternon angustipons
- Kinosternon dunni

===== Pelomedusidae =====
- Pelusios broadleyi

===== Podocnemididae =====
- Peltocephalus dumerilianus
- Podocnemis erythrocephala
- Podocnemis sextuberculata
- Podocnemis unifilis

===== Testudinidae =====
- Centrochelys sulcata
- Chelonoidis becki
- Chelonoidis chilensis
- Chelonoidis denticulatus
- Chelonoidis duncanensis
- Chelonoidis vandenburghi
- Chersobius signatus
- Chersobius solus
- Geochelone elegans
- Geochelone gigantea
- Gopherus agassizii
- Gopherus flavomarginatus
- Gopherus polyphemus
- Indotestudo travancorica
- Kinixys homeana
- Malacochersus tornieri
- Manouria impressa
- Testudo graeca
- Testudo horsfieldii

===== Trionychidae =====
- Amyda cartilaginea
- Cyclanorbis senegalensis
- Cycloderma aubryi
- Nilssonia gangetica
- Nilssonia hurum
- Nilssonia leithii
- Pelochelys bibroni
- Pelodiscus sinensis
- Trionyx triunguis

=== Sarcopterygii ===
==== Coelacanthiformes ====
===== Latimeriidae =====
- Latimeria menadoensis

== Cnidaria ==
=== Anthozoa ===
==== Actiniaria ====
===== Edwardsiidae =====
- Nematostella vectensis

==== Alcyonacea ====
===== Plexauridae =====
- Eunicella verrucosa

==== Helioporacea ====
===== Helioporidae =====
- Heliopora coerulea

==== Scleractinia ====
===== Acroporidae =====
- Acropora abrolhosensis
- Acropora aculeus
- Acropora acuminata
- Acropora anthocercis
- Acropora aspera
- Acropora awi
- Acropora batunai
- Acropora caroliniana
- Acropora dendrum
- Acropora derawanensis
- Acropora desalwii
- Acropora donei
- Acropora echinata
- Acropora elegans
- Acropora globiceps
- Acropora hemprichii
- Acropora hoeksemai
- Acropora horrida
- Acropora indonesia
- Acropora jacquelineae
- Acropora kimbeensis
- Acropora kirstyae
- Acropora kosurini
- Acropora listeri
- Acropora loisetteae
- Acropora lokani
- Acropora lovelli
- Acropora microclados
- Acropora multiacuta
- Acropora palmerae
- Acropora paniculata
- Acropora papillare
- Acropora pharaonis
- Acropora plumosa
- Acropora polystoma
- Acropora retusa
- Acropora russelli
- Acropora simplex
- Acropora solitaryensis
- Acropora speciosa
- Acropora spicifera
- Acropora striata
- Acropora tenella
- Acropora turaki
- Acropora vaughani
- Acropora verweyi
- Acropora walindii
- Acropora willisae
- Anacropora matthai
- Anacropora puertogalerae
- Anacropora reticulata
- Astreopora cucullata
- Astreopora incrustans
- Astreopora moretonensis
- Isopora brueggemanni
- Isopora crateriformis
- Isopora cuneata
- Montipora altasepta
- Montipora angulata
- Montipora australiensis
- Montipora cactus
- Montipora calcarea
- Montipora caliculata
- Montipora capricornis
- Montipora cebuensis
- Montipora cocosensis
- Montipora corbettensis
- Montipora crassituberculata
- Montipora delicatula
- Montipora flabellata
- Montipora florida
- Montipora friabilis
- Montipora gaimardi
- Montipora hodgsoni
- Montipora lobulata
- Montipora mactanensis
- Montipora malampaya
- Montipora meandrina
- Montipora orientalis
- Montipora patula
- Montipora samarensis
- Montipora stilosa
- Montipora turtlensis
- Montipora verruculosus
- Montipora vietnamensis

===== Agariciidae =====
- Agaricia lamarcki
- Leptoseris incrustans
- Leptoseris yabei
- Pachyseris involuta
- Pachyseris rugosa
- Pavona bipartita
- Pavona cactus
- Pavona danai
- Pavona decussata
- Pavona diffluens
- Pavona venosa

===== Astrocoeniidae =====
- Stylocoeniella cocosensis

===== Caryophylliidae =====
- Polycyathus isabela

===== Dendrophylliidae =====
- Turbinaria bifrons
- Turbinaria heronensis
- Turbinaria mesenterina
- Turbinaria patula
- Turbinaria peltata
- Turbinaria reniformis
- Turbinaria stellulata

===== Euphylliidae =====
- Catalaphyllia jardinei
- Euphyllia ancora
- Euphyllia cristata
- Euphyllia paraancora
- Euphyllia paradivisa
- Euphyllia paraglabrescens
- Nemenzophyllia turbida
- Physogyra lichtensteini
- Plerogyra discus

===== Faviidae =====
- Australogyra zelli
- Barabattoia laddi
- Caulastrea connata
- Caulastrea curvata
- Caulastrea echinulata
- Cyphastrea agassizi
- Cyphastrea hexasepta
- Cyphastrea ocellina
- Echinopora ashmorensis
- Echinopora robusta
- Favia rosaria
- Favites spinosa
- Goniastrea deformis
- Goniastrea ramosa
- Leptastrea aequalis
- Leptoria irregularis
- Montastraea franksi
- Montastrea multipunctata
- Montastrea salebrosa
- Montastrea serageldini
- Moseleya latistellata
- Platygyra yaeyamaensis

===== Fungiidae =====
- Fungia curvata
- Fungia seychellensis
- Fungia taiwanensis
- Halomitra clavator
- Heliofungia actiniformis

===== Meandrinidae =====
- Dendrogyra cylindrus
- Dichocoenia stokesii

===== Mussidae =====
- Acanthastrea bowerbanki
- Acanthastrea brevis
- Acanthastrea faviaformis
- Acanthastrea hemprichii
- Acanthastrea ishigakiensis
- Acanthastrea regularis
- Lobophyllia dentatus
- Lobophyllia diminuta
- Lobophyllia flabelliformis
- Mycetophyllia ferox
- Symphyllia hassi

===== Oculinidae =====
- Galaxea acrhelia
- Galaxea astreata
- Galaxea cryptoramosa
- Oculina varicosa

===== Pectiniidae =====
- Echinophyllia costata
- Mycedium steeni
- Pectinia africanus
- Pectinia alcicornis
- Pectinia lactuca

===== Pocilloporidae =====
- Pocillopora ankeli
- Pocillopora danae
- Pocillopora elegans
- Pocillopora indiania
- Pocillopora inflata
- Seriatopora aculeata
- Seriatopora dendritica

===== Poritidae =====
- Alveopora allingi
- Alveopora daedalea
- Alveopora fenestrata
- Alveopora gigas
- Alveopora japonica
- Alveopora marionensis
- Alveopora verrilliana
- Goniopora albiconus
- Goniopora burgosi
- Goniopora cellulosa
- Goniopora planulata
- Goniopora polyformis
- Porites aranetai
- Porites attenuata
- Porites cocosensis
- Porites cumulatus
- Porites horizontalata
- Porites napopora
- Porites nigrescens
- Porites okinawensis
- Porites rugosa
- Porites sillimaniana
- Porites sverdrupi
- Porites tuberculosa
- Poritipora paliformis

===== Siderastreidae =====
- Anomastraea irregularis
- Coscinaraea hahazimaensis
- Horastrea indica
- Psammocora stellata

=== Hydrozoa ===
==== Milleporina ====
===== Milleporidae =====
- Millepora foveolata
- Millepora latifolia

== Echinodermata ==
=== Holothuroidea ===
==== Aspidochirotida ====
===== Holothuriidae =====
- Actinopyga echinites
- Actinopyga mauritiana
- Actinopyga miliaris
- Bohadschia maculisparsa
- Holothuria arenacava
- Holothuria fuscogilva
- Holothuria platei

===== Stichopodidae =====
- Apostichopus parvimensis
- Stichopus herrmanni

== Mollusca ==
=== Bivalvia ===
==== Arcida ====
===== Arcidae =====
- Scaphula nagarjunai

==== Cardiida ====
===== Cardiidae =====
- Tridacna derasa
- Tridacna gigas
- Tridacna mbalavuana
- Tridacna rosewateri

==== Unionida ====
===== Hyriidae =====
- Castalia martensi
- Diplodon expansus
- Diplodon pfeifferi
- Westralunio carteri

===== Iridinidae =====
- Chambardia nyassaensis
- Mutela alata
- Mutela franci
- Mutela legumen

===== Margaritiferidae =====
- Margaritifera middendorffi

===== Mycetopodidae =====
- Diplodontites olssoni

===== Unionidae =====
- Alasmidonta heterodon
- Alasmidonta varicosa
- Anodonta nuttalliana
- Brazzaea anceyi
- Coelatura alluaudi
- Coelatura lobensis
- Coelatura rotula
- Cuneopsis rufescens
- Elliptio roanokensis
- Elliptoideus sloatianus
- Fusconaia subrotunda
- Gonidea angulata
- Lamprotula blaisei
- Lamprotula polysticta
- Lamprotula rochechouartii
- Lamprotula scripta
- Lamprotula tortuosa
- Lampsilis abrupta
- Lampsilis cariosa
- Lampsilis dolabraeformis
- Ligumia nasuta
- Microcondylaea bonellii
- Mweruella mweruensis
- Obovaria jacksoniana
- Parreysia khadakvaslaensis
- Pleurobema oviforme
- Pleurobema strodeanum
- Potamilus capax
- Pseudanodonta complanata
- Simpsonaias ambigua
- Toxolasma pullus
- Unio terminalis
- Unio tumidiformis

==== Venerida ====
===== Dreissenidae =====
- Congeria kusceri
- Dreissena blanci

===== Sphaeriidae =====
- Pisidium artifex
- Pisidium centrale
- Pisidium johnsoni
- Pisidium sanguinichristi
- Pisidium ultramontanum
- Sphaerium rivicola

=== Cephalopoda ===
==== Octopoda ====
===== Opisthoteuthidae =====
- Opisthoteuthis calypso
- Opisthoteuthis massyae

=== Gastropoda ===
==== Allogastropoda ====
===== Glacidorbidae =====
- Glacidorbis occidentalis

===== Valvatidae =====
- Valvata hirsutecostata
- Valvata relicta
- Valvata utahensis
- Valvata virens

==== Architaenioglossa ====
===== Aciculidae =====
- Acicula benoiti
- Acicula multilineata
- Acicula norrisi
- Acicula palaestinensis
- Platyla foliniana
- Platyla jankowskiana
- Platyla lusitanica
- Platyla maasseni
- Platyla peloponnesica
- Platyla procax
- Renea gentilei
- Renea gormonti
- Renea paillona

===== Ampullariidae =====
- Lanistes ciliatus
- Lanistes farleri
- Lanistes grasseti
- Pomacea palmeri
- Pomacea quinindensis

===== Craspedopomatidae =====
- Craspedopoma lyonnetianum

===== Cyclophoridae =====
- Boucardicus albocinctus
- Boucardicus antiquus
- Boucardicus rakotoarisoni
- Boucardicus tridentatus
- Cyathopoma randalana
- Ditropis whitei
- Platyrhaphe sp. nov. 1

===== Diplommatinidae =====
- Diancta macrostoma
- Opisthostoma bihamulatum
- Opisthostoma michaelis
- Palaina godeffroyana
- Palaina strigata
- Palaina subregularis
- Plectostoma senex

===== Megalomastomatidae =====
- Cochlostoma acutum
- Cochlostoma affine
- Cochlostoma canestrinii
- Cochlostoma erika
- Cochlostoma fuchsi
- Cochlostoma paladilhianum

===== Neocyclotidae =====
- Amphicyclotulus liratus
- Amphicyclotulus perplexus
- Fijiopoma diatreta

===== Pupinidae =====
- Hedleya macleayi
- Suavocallia splendens

===== Viviparidae =====
- Campeloma decampi
- Lioplax cyclostomaformis

==== Cycloneritimorpha ====
===== Hydrocenidae =====
- Georissa laseroni
- Monterissa gowerensis

===== Neritidae =====
- Clithon madecassinum
- Neritina granosa
- Theodoxus marteli
- Theodoxus numidicus

==== Eupulmonata ====
===== Ellobiidae =====
- Zospeum allegrettii
- Zospeum exiguum

==== Hygrophila ====
===== Acroloxidae =====
- Acroloxus egirdirensis
- Acroloxus improvisus
- Acroloxus tetensi

===== Chilinidae =====
- Chilina angusta

===== Lymnaeidae =====
- Erinna newcombi
- Kutikina hispida
- Lymnaea ovalior

===== Physidae =====
- Physa zionis
- Physella spelunca
- Physella utahensis
- Physella zionis

===== Planorbidae =====
- Africanogyrus rodriguezensis
- Ancylus scalariformis
- Bulinus mutandensis
- Bulinus obtusus
- Bulinus permembranaceus
- Gyraulus albidus
- Gyraulus argaeicus
- Gyraulus bakeri
- Gyraulus bekaensis
- Gyraulus nedyalkovi
- Gyraulus pamphylicus
- Miratesta celebensis
- Planorbella magnifica
- Planorbella oregonensis
- Planorbis presbensis
- Rhodacmea elatior

==== Littorinimorpha ====
===== Amnicolidae =====
- Amnicola cora
- Amnicola stygius
- Emmericia expansilabris
- Emmericia ventricosa

===== Assimineidae =====
- Acmella sp. nov. 'Ba Tai'
- Assiminea infirma
- Fijianella calciphila
- Fijianella cornucopia
- Fijianella laddi
- Omphalotropis costulata
- Omphalotropis longula
- Omphalotropis rosea

===== Bithyniidae =====
- Bithynia badiella
- Bithynia cettinensis
- Bithynia graeca
- Bithynia kobialkai
- Bithynia pseudemmericia
- Bithynia quintanai
- Bithynia yildirimii
- Congodoma zairensis
- Gabbia pallidula
- Pseudobithynia ambrakis
- Pseudobithynia kirka
- Sierraia expansilabrum
- Sierraia leonensis

===== Cochliopidae =====
- Heleobia andecola
- Heleobia aperta
- Heleobia aponensis
- Heleobia galilaea
- Heleobia ortoni

===== Hydrobiidae =====
- Akiyoshia kobayashii
- Alzoniella cornucopia
- Alzoniella elliptica
- Alzoniella fabrianensis
- Alzoniella feneriensis
- Alzoniella haicabia
- Alzoniella junqua
- Alzoniella lunensis
- Alzoniella navarrensis
- Alzoniella perrisii
- Alzoniella somiedoensis
- Antrobia breweri
- Aphaostracon asthenes
- Aphaostracon chalarogyrus
- Aphaostracon monas
- Aphaostracon pycnus
- Arganiella wolfi
- Beddomeia angulata
- Beddomeia averni
- Beddomeia bellii
- Beddomeia bowryensis
- Beddomeia briansmithi
- Beddomeia camensis
- Beddomeia forthensis
- Beddomeia franklandensis
- Beddomeia fromensis
- Beddomeia fultoni
- Beddomeia gibba
- Beddomeia hallae
- Beddomeia hullii
- Beddomeia inflata
- Beddomeia kershawi
- Beddomeia kessneri
- Beddomeia krybetes
- Beddomeia launcestonensis
- Beddomeia lodderae
- Beddomeia mesibovi
- Beddomeia minima
- Beddomeia petterdi
- Beddomeia phasianella
- Beddomeia protuberata
- Beddomeia ronaldi
- Beddomeia salmonis
- Beddomeia tasmanica
- Beddomeia topsiae
- Beddomeia turnerae
- Beddomeia waterhouseae
- Beddomeia wilmotensis
- Beddomeia wiseae
- Beddomeia zeehanensis
- Belgrandia gfrast
- Belgrandia gibberula
- Belgrandia latina
- Belgrandia silviae
- Belgrandia sp. nov. 'wiwanensis'
- Belgrandia torifera
- Belgrandiella angelovi
- Belgrandiella bulgarica
- Belgrandiella bureschi
- Belgrandiella croatica
- Belgrandiella crucis
- Belgrandiella dobrostanica
- Belgrandiella edessana
- Belgrandiella fuchsi
- Belgrandiella globulosa
- Belgrandiella hershleri
- Belgrandiella hessei
- Belgrandiella pusilla
- Belgrandiella schleschi
- Belgrandiella substricta
- Belgrandiella superior
- Belgrandiella zagoraensis
- Belgrandiella zermanica
- Boetersiella davisi
- Boleana umbilicata
- Bythinella angelitae
- Bythinella cebennensis
- Bythinella eurystoma
- Bythinella galerae
- Bythinella geisserti
- Bythinella ginolensis
- Bythinella isolata
- Bythinella jourdei
- Bythinella kapelana
- Bythinella kazdaghensis
- Bythinella micherdzinskii
- Bythinella molcsany
- Bythinella occasiuncula
- Bythinella padiraci
- Bythinella robiciana
- Bythinella rondelaudi
- Bythinella roubionensis
- Bythinella rubiginosa
- Bythinella vimperei
- Bythinella wawrzineki
- Bythiospeum acicula
- Bythiospeum drouetianum
- Bythiospeum exiguum
- Bythiospeum geyeri
- Bythiospeum haessleini
- Bythiospeum heldii
- Bythiospeum helveticum
- Bythiospeum hungaricum
- Bythiospeum oshanovae
- Bythiospeum rasini
- Bythiospeum reisalpense
- Bythiospeum saxigenum
- Bythiospeum suevicum
- Bythiospeum waegelei
- Caledoconcha mariapetrae
- Catapyrgus sororius
- Cavernisa zaschevi
- Cochliopa texana
- Cochliopina milleri
- Colligyrus depressus
- Durangonella coahuilae
- Floridobia helicogyra
- Floridobia mica
- Floridobia monroensis
- Floridobia parva
- Floridobia ponderosa
- Floridobia vanhyningi
- Floridobia wekiwae
- Fluvidona anodonta
- Fluvidona dyeriana
- Fonscochlea accepta
- Fonscochlea conica
- Fontigens antroecetes
- Ginaia munda
- Graecoanatolica kocapinarica
- Graziana quadrifoglio
- Graziana slavonica
- Guadiella andalucesis
- Guadiella arconadae
- Guadiella ramosae
- Hadopyrgus rawhiti
- Hadziella deminuta
- Hadziella krkae
- Hadziella sketi
- Hauffenia danubialis
- Hauffenia media
- Hauffenia sp. nov.
- Hauffenia wagneri
- Hemistomia flexicolumella
- Hemistomia napaia
- Heraultiella exilis
- Horatia macedonica
- Horatia novoselensis
- Hydrobia djerbaensis
- Hydrobia luvilana
- Iberhoratia gatoa
- Iberhoratia morenoi
- Iglica acicularis
- Iglica elongata
- Iglica gracilis
- Iglica kleinzellensis
- Iglica langhofferi
- Iglica sidariensis
- Iglica tellinii
- Insignia macrostoma
- Islamia azarum
- Islamia bomangiana
- Islamia bosniaca
- Islamia cianensis
- Islamia epirana
- Islamia lagari
- Islamia spirata
- Jardinella coreena
- Jardinella corrugata
- Jardinella edgbastonensis
- Jardinella eulo
- Jardinella isolata
- Kerkia brezicensis
- Lanzaia kotlusae
- Lanzaia vjetrenicae
- Lanzaiopsis savinica
- Leiorhagium cathartes
- Leiorhagium orokau
- Leiorhagium supernum
- Leptopyrgus melbourni
- Lepyrium showalteri
- Marstoniopsis croatica
- Mercuria bayonnensis
- Micropyrgula stankovici
- Nanocochlea monticola
- Nanocochlea pupoidea
- Neofossarulus stankovici
- Ohridohoratia polinskii
- Opacuincola caeca
- Opacuincola cervicesmadentes
- Opacuincola dulcinella
- Opacuincola eduardstraussi
- Opacuincola johannstraussi
- Opacuincola josefstraussi
- Opacuincola lentesferens
- Opacuincola ngatapuna
- Opacuincola ovata
- Opacuincola permutata
- Palacanthilhiopsis margritae
- Palacanthilhiopsis vervierii
- Paladilhiopsis buresi
- Paladilhiopsis grobbeni
- Paladilhiopsis thessalica
- Paludiscala caramba
- Paraprososthenia lynnei
- Phrantela annamurrayae
- Phrantela conica
- Phrantela kutikina
- Phreatodrobia imitata
- Plagigeyeria gladilini
- Plagigeyeria stochi
- Pontobelgrandiella nitida
- Potamopyrgus doci
- Potamopyrgus kaitunuparaoa
- Pseudamnicola anteisensis
- Pseudamnicola bacescui
- Pseudamnicola chia
- Pseudamnicola gasulli
- Pseudamnicola hydrobiopsis
- Pseudamnicola intranodosa
- Pseudamnicola malickyi
- Pseudamnicola meluzzii
- Pseudamnicola pieperi
- Pseudamnicola pisolinus
- Pseudohoratia brusinae
- Pseudohoratia lacustris
- Pseudohoratia ochridana
- Pyrgohydrobia grochmalickii
- Pyrgohydrobia sanctinaumi
- Pyrgulopsis amargosae
- Pyrgulopsis avernalis
- Pyrgulopsis bacchus
- Pyrgulopsis conica
- Pyrgulopsis diablensis
- Pyrgulopsis gilae
- Pyrgulopsis giuliani
- Pyrgulopsis glandulosa
- Pyrgulopsis greggi
- Pyrgulopsis montezumensis
- Pyrgulopsis roswellensis
- Radomaniola callosa
- Radomaniola rhodopensis
- Rhamphopoma magnum
- Sadleriana supercarinata
- Saxurinator brandti
- Stankovicia pavlovici
- Stankovicia wagneri
- Stiobia nana
- Strugia ohridana
- Taylorconcha serpenticola
- Tefennia tefennica
- Tongapyrgus kohitatea
- Trochidrobia minuta
- Trochidrobia smithi
- Turcorientalia anatolica
- Turcorientalia hohenackeri
- Turricaspia ismailensis
- Victodrobia millerae
- Xestopyrgula dybowskii

===== Lithoglyphidae =====
- Fluminicola modoci
- Pseudobenedictia michnoi

===== Littorinidae =====
- Cremnoconchus conicus

===== Moitessieriidae =====
- Moitessieria calloti
- Moitessieria foui
- Moitessieria guadelopensis
- Moitessieria juvenisanguis
- Moitessieria lludrigaensis
- Moitessieria massoti
- Moitessieria mugae
- Moitessieria nezi
- Paladilhia jamblussensis
- Paladilhia roselloi
- Paladilhia umbilicata
- Palaospeum bessoni
- Spiralix gloriae
- Spiralix pequenoensis

===== Pomatiopsidae =====
- Hubendickia pellucida
- Hydrorissoia munensis
- Jullienia albaobscura
- Jullienia costata
- Jullienia flava
- Jullienia minima
- Jullienia prasongi
- Lacunopsis deiecta
- Lacunopsis globosa
- Lacunopsis minutarpiettei
- Lacunopsis munensis
- Oncomelania nosophora
- Pachydrobia bertini
- Pachydrobia levayi
- Tricula conica
- Tricula mahadevensis

===== Stenothyridae =====
- Stenothyra decollata
- Stenothyra laotiensis

==== Neogastropoda ====
===== Conidae =====
- Conus allaryi
- Conus anabathrum
- Conus ardisiaceus
- Conus cacao
- Conus cepasi
- Conus compressus
- Conus cuvieri
- Conus decoratus
- Conus duffyi
- Conus felitae
- Conus fontonae
- Conus guinaicus
- Conus henckesi
- Conus hennequini
- Conus hieroglyphus
- Conus immelmani
- Conus jeanmartini
- Conus julii
- Conus melvilli
- Conus rawaiensis
- Conus regonae
- Conus richardbinghami
- Conus stearnsii
- Conus tacomae
- Conus teodorae
- Conus thevenardensis
- Conus xicoi

==== Sorbeoconcha ====
===== Melanopsidae =====
- Esperiana sangarica
- Melanopsis subgraellsiana

===== Pachychilidae =====
- Brotia annamita
- Brotia citrina
- Brotia hoabinhensis
- Brotia laodelectata
- Brotia paludiformis
- Brotia solemiana
- Brotia subgloriosa
- Brotia wykoffi
- Potadoma alutacea
- Potadoma vogeli

===== Paludomidae =====
- Cleopatra exarata
- Cleopatra obscura
- Reymondia tanganyicensis
- Tanganyicia michelae

===== Pleuroceridae =====
- Athearnia anthonyi
- Elimia acuta
- Elimia alabamensis
- Elimia aterina
- Elimia boykiniana
- Elimia capillaris
- Elimia crenatella
- Elimia haysiana
- Elimia hydei
- Elimia interrupta
- Elimia nassula
- Elimia olivula
- Elimia porrecta
- Elimia pybasi
- Elimia strigosa
- Elimia teres
- Elimia varians
- Leptoxis ampla
- Leptoxis minor
- Leptoxis picta
- Leptoxis praerosa
- Leptoxis virgata
- Lithasia armigera
- Lithasia duttoniana
- Lithasia salebrosa
- Pleurocera alveare
- Pleurocera annulifera
- Pleurocera brumbyi
- Pleurocera curta
- Pleurocera showalteri
- Pleurocera walkeri

===== Thiaridae =====
- Melanoides depravata
- Melanoides dupuisi
- Melanoides mweruensis
- Melanoides truncatelliformis
- Semisulcospira decipiens
- Semisulcospira niponica
- Semisulcospira ourense

==== Stylommatophora ====
===== Acavidae =====
- Ampelita soulaiana
- Clavator moreleti
- Stylodonta unidentata

===== Achatinellidae =====
- Elasmias cernicum
- Elasmias kitaiwojimanum
- Lamellidea biplicata
- Lamellidea ogasawarana

===== Achatinidae =====
- Archachatina bicarinata

===== Agriolimacidae =====
- Deroceras bistimulatum
- Deroceras corsicum
- Deroceras dewinteri
- Deroceras ercinae
- Deroceras gavdosensis
- Deroceras gorgonium
- Deroceras halieos
- Deroceras karnaniensis
- Deroceras kasium
- Deroceras kythirensis
- Deroceras minoicum
- Deroceras neuteboomi
- Deroceras nyphoni
- Furcopenis darioi

===== Argnidae =====
- Agardhiella tunde
- Argna bourguignatiana
- Argna valsabina
- Speleodentorcula beroni

===== Arionidae =====
- Arion iratii

===== Ariophantidae =====
- Microcystina sp. nov. 'Ba Tai'

===== Camaenidae =====
- Basedowena hinsbyi
- Carinotrachia carsoniana
- Cristilabrum isolatum
- Cristilabrum monodon
- Cristilabrum primum
- Cristilabrum rectum
- Cristilabrum simplex
- Cupedora nottensis
- Divellomelon hillieri
- Glyptorhagada bordaensis
- Glyptorhagada euglypta
- Glyptorhagada kooringensis
- Glyptorhagada tattawuppana
- Kimboraga koolanensis
- Kimboraga micromphala
- Kimboraga yammerana
- Mouldingia occidentalis
- Ningbingia australis
- Ningbingia bulla
- Ningbingia dentiens
- Ningbingia laurina
- Ningbingia octava
- Ningbingia res
- Offachloritis dryanderensis
- Ordtrachia elegans
- Pallidelix bennetti
- Pommerhelix depressa
- Prototrachia sedula
- Rhagada gibbensis
- Rhagada harti
- Semotrachia euzyga
- Setobaudinia spina
- Sinumelon bednalli
- Tolgachloritis campbelli
- Torresitrachia thedana
- Turgenitubulus aslini
- Turgenitubulus costus
- Turgenitubulus depressus
- Turgenitubulus foramenus
- Turgenitubulus opiranus
- Turgenitubulus pagodula
- Turgenitubulus tanmurrana
- Vidumelon wattii
- Westraltrachia alterna
- Westraltrachia inopinata
- Westraltrachia lievreana
- Westraltrachia porcata
- Westraltrachia recta
- Westraltrachia subtila
- Westraltrachia turbinata
- Youwanjela wilsoni

===== Cerastidae =====
- Pachnodus lionneti
- Pachnodus praslinus

===== Charopidae =====
- Allocharopa erskinensis
- Cralopa colliveri
- Dupucharopa millestriata
- Geminoropa scindocataracta
- Hedleyoconcha ailaketoae
- Lagivala minusculus
- Lagivala vivus
- Microcharopa mimula
- Norfolcioconch iota
- Norfolcioconch norfolkensis
- Oreomava otwayensis
- Penescosta mathewsi
- Penescosta sororcula
- Pernagera gatliffi
- Pilsbrycharopa tumida
- Pilula praetumida
- Radiodiscus compactus
- Rhysoconcha atanuiensis
- Roblinella agnewi
- Ruatara oparica
- Sinployea adposita
- Sinployea godeffroyana
- Sinployea inermis
- Sinployea lauenis
- Sinployea monstrosa
- Sinployea pitcairnensis
- Sinployea recursa

===== Chlamydephoridae =====
- Chlamydephorus burnupi
- Chlamydephorus dimidius

===== Chondrinidae =====
- Abida ateni
- Chondrina centralis
- Chondrina gasulli
- Chondrina gerhardi
- Chondrina maginensis
- Chondrina oligodonta
- Rupestrella homala
- Rupestrella jaeckeli
- Rupestrella occulta
- Solatopupa cianensis
- Solatopupa psarolena

===== Clausiliidae =====
- Albinaria adrianae
- Albinaria adriani
- Albinaria ariadne
- Albinaria christae
- Albinaria compressa
- Albinaria cytherae
- Albinaria evelynae
- Albinaria fuchskaeufeli
- Albinaria haessleini
- Albinaria idyllica
- Albinaria ithomensis
- Albinaria jaeckeli
- Albinaria janicollis
- Albinaria janisadana
- Albinaria klemmi
- Albinaria li
- Albinaria linnei
- Albinaria litoraria
- Albinaria moreletiana
- Albinaria pelocarinata
- Albinaria rebeli
- Albinaria rollei
- Albinaria solicola
- Albinaria sphakiota
- Albinaria sturanyi
- Albinaria subaii
- Albinaria sublamellosa
- Albinaria thiesseae
- Albinaria ulrikae
- Albinaria vrondamasa
- Albinaria wettsteini
- Albinaria wiesei
- Albinaria xanthostoma
- Albinaria zilchi
- Alinda pancici
- Alopia alpina
- Alopia grossuana
- Alopia hirschfelderi
- Alopia maciana
- Alopia mafteiana
- Alopia meschendorferi
- Alopia straminicollis
- Bulgarica moellendorffi
- Bulgarica mystica
- Bulgarica stolii
- Carinigera albicosta
- Carinigera calabacensis
- Carinigera leucorhaphe
- Carinigera liebegottae
- Carinigera octava
- Carinigera septima
- Carinigera superba
- Carinigera tantilla
- Carinigera torifera
- Euxinella subaii
- Graecophaedusa sperrlei
- Idyla liebegottae
- Idyla pelobsoleta
- Macedonica brabeneci
- Macedonica guicciardii
- Macedonica pinteri
- Macedonica slavica
- Macedonica teodorae
- Macedonica zilchi
- Montenegrina stankovici
- Protoherilla mirabilis
- Ruthenica gallinae
- Tsoukatosia argolica
- Tsoukatosia liae
- Tsoukatosia nicoleae

===== Cochlicellidae =====
- Obelus despreauxii
- Obelus moratus

===== Cochlicopidae =====
- Hypnophila emiliana
- Hypnophila girottii

===== Discidae =====
- Atlantica anagaensis
- Atlantica laurisilvae
- Atlantica rupivaga
- Discus marmorensis

===== Endodontidae =====
- Thaumatodon laddi
- Zyzzyxdonta alata

===== Enidae =====
- Mastus amenazada
- Mastus claudia
- Napaeus boucheti
- Napaeus elegans
- Napaeus esbeltus
- Napaeus lichenicola
- Napaeus minimus
- Napaeus ornamentatus
- Napaeus roccellicola
- Napaeus rupicola
- Napaeus tagamichensis
- Napaeus taguluchensis
- Peristoma merduenianum

===== Euconulidae =====
- Caldwellia imperfecta
- Ctenophila vorticella
- Dupontia levis
- Dupontia nitella
- Dupontia poweri
- Liardetia boninensis
- Plegma caelatura

===== Ferussaciidae =====
- Amphorella hypselia
- Amphorella iridescens
- Cecilioides connollyi
- Cylichnidia ovuliformis

===== Gastrodontidae =====
- Janulus stephanophorus
- Nesokaliella intermedia
- Nesokaliella minuta
- Nesokaliella subturritula

===== Helicarionidae =====
- Buffetia retinaculum
- Diastole tenuistriata
- Harmogenanina argentea
- Helicarion leopardina
- Helicarion porrectus
- Helicarion rubicundus
- Iredaleoconcha caporaphe
- Kaliella hongkongensis
- Philonesia filiceti
- Philonesia pitcairnensis
- Pittoconcha concinna
- Theskelomensor creon
- Tubuaia fosbergi

===== Helicidae =====
- Arianta xatartii
- Chilostoma adelozona
- Codringtonia elisabethae
- Codringtonia eucineta
- Codringtonia gittenbergeri
- Codringtonia helenae
- Codringtonia intusplicata
- Codringtonia neocrassa
- Codringtonia parnassia
- Hemicycla eurythyra
- Hemicycla inutilis
- Hemicycla pouchet
- Iberus campesinus
- Iberus ortizi
- Macularia saintivesi
- Tacheocampylaea carotii
- Tacheocampylaea raspailii
- Theba impugnata
- Tyrrheniberus ridens
- Tyrrheniberus villicus
- Vidovicia coerulans

===== Helicodontidae =====
- Falkneria camerani

===== Helminthoglyptidae =====
- Eremarionta immaculata
- Eremarionta millepalmarum
- Helminthoglypta allynsmithi
- Helminthoglypta coelata
- Micrarionta facta
- Micrarionta gabbii
- Micrarionta opuntia
- Monadenia circumcarinata
- Monadenia setosa
- Xerarionta intercisa
- Xerarionta redimita
- Xerarionta tryoni

===== Hygromiidae =====
- Actinella actinophora
- Actinella armitageana
- Actinella giramica
- Actinella laciniosa
- Actinella littorinella
- Canariella bimbachensis
- Canariella fortunata
- Canariella hispidula
- Canariella leprosa
- Canariella pontelirae
- Canariella pthonera
- Candidula fiorii
- Candidula spadae
- Caseolus baixoensis
- Caseolus calculus
- Caseolus leptostictus
- Cernuellopsis ghisottii
- Ciliellopsis oglasae
- Cryptosaccus asturiensis
- Disculella spirulina
- Ganula gadirana
- Helicella valdeona
- Hygromia golasi
- Hygromia odeca
- Hygromia tassyi
- Hystricella leacockiana
- Hystricella turricula
- Ichnusomunda usticensis
- Leptaxis furva
- Metafruticicola crassicosta
- Metafruticicola pieperi
- Monacha rizzae
- Monacha ruffoi
- Monachoides fallax
- Moreletina obruta
- Nienhuisiella antonellae
- Polloneria contermina
- Pyrenaearia cotiellae
- Pyrenaearia daanidentata
- Pyrenaearia navasi
- Pyrenaearia parva
- Pyrenaearia velascoi
- Schileykiella bodoni
- Spirorbula squalida
- Xerocrassa cardonae
- Xerocrassa gharlapsi
- Xerocrassa roblesi
- Xerocrassa zaharensis
- Xerotricha bierzona

===== Lauriidae =====
- Leiostyla arborea
- Leiostyla colvillei
- Leiostyla corneocostata
- Leiostyla ferraria
- Leiostyla filicum
- Leiostyla heterodon
- Leiostyla laurinea
- Leiostyla macilenta

===== Limacidae =====
- Lehmannia medioflagellata
- Lehmannia vrancensis
- Limax dobrogicus
- Limax hemmeni

===== Megomphicidae =====
- Ammonitella yatesii

===== Milacidae =====
- Tandonia bolensis

===== Orculidae =====
- Orcula zilchi

===== Oreohelicidae =====
- Oreohelix jugalis
- Oreohelix vortex
- Oreohelix waltoni

===== Orthalicidae =====
- Bothriembryon bradshaweri
- Bothriembryon brazieri
- Bothriembryon glauerti
- Bothriembryon irvineanus
- Bothriembryon spenceri
- Bothriembryon whitleyi
- Bulimulus akamatus
- Bulimulus alethorhytidus
- Bulimulus amastroides
- Bulimulus blombergi
- Bulimulus calvus
- Bulimulus cavagnaroi
- Bulimulus darwini
- Bulimulus hoodensis
- Bulimulus jervisensis
- Bulimulus nesioticus
- Bulimulus perrus
- Bulimulus rabidensis
- Bulimulus tortuganus
- Bulimulus unifasciatus
- Bulimulus ustulatus
- Drymaeus acervatus
- Drymaeus henseli
- Placostylus ambagiosus
- Placostylus bollonsi
- Placostylus eddystonensis
- Placostylus elobatus
- Placostylus fibratus
- Placostylus hongii
- Placostylus malleatus
- Placostylus porphyrostomus

===== Oxychilidae =====
- Carpathica elisabethae
- Cibinia nana
- Mediterranea pieperi
- Mediterranea pygmaeus
- Oxychilus amblyopus
- Oxychilus farinesianus
- Oxychilus oglasicola

===== Papillodermatidae =====
- Papilloderma altonagai

===== Parmacellidae =====
- Cryptella auriculata
- Cryptella famarae
- Cryptella susannae

===== Partulidae =====
- Partula hyalina
- Samoana margaritae

===== Polygyridae =====
- Cryptomastix magnidentata

===== Pristilomatidae =====
- Gollumia torumbilicata
- Gyralina epeirotica
- Gyralina ermonae
- Gyralina formosa
- Gyralina hausdorfi
- Gyralina mljetica
- Gyralina nautilopsis
- Gyralina orientalis
- Gyralina pageti
- Gyralina riedeli
- Gyralina tarabosensis
- Gyralina tsatsae
- Gyralina velasensis
- Gyralina velkovrhi
- Lindbergia pageti
- Lindbergia pinteri
- Lindbergia spiliaenymphis
- Lindbergia stylokamarae
- Vitrea megistislavras
- Vitrea pageti
- Vitrea pinteri
- Vitrea ulrichi

===== Punctidae =====
- Christianoconcha quintalia
- Pasmaditta jungermanniae
- Punctum seychellarum

===== Pupillidae =====
- Nesopupa madgei
- Ptychalaea dedecora

===== Rhytididae =====
- Natalina wesseliana

===== Spelaeodiscidae =====
- Spelaeodiscus bulgaricus

===== Streptaxidae =====
- Acanthennea erinacea
- Augustula braueri
- Gonidomus sulcatus
- Gonospira cylindrella
- Gonospira holostoma
- Gonospira madgei
- Gonospira striaticostus
- Gonospira teres
- Gonospira turgidula
- Gulella amboniensis
- Microstrophia nana
- Priodiscus costatus
- Priodiscus serratus
- Silhouettia silhouettae

===== Strophocheilidae =====
- Gonyostomus insularis

===== Succineidae =====
- Boninosuccinea ogasawarae
- Boninosuccinea punctulispira
- Oxyloma pinteri

===== Trissexodontidae =====
- Hatumia cobosi
- Oestophora granesae
- Oestophora mariae
- Suboestophora altamirai
- Suboestophora hispanica
- Suboestophora jeresae

===== Trochomorphidae =====
- Videna electra

===== Urocyclidae =====
- Sheldonia puzeyi

===== Vertiginidae =====
- Acinolaemus carcharodon
- Anauchen informis
- Gastrocopta boninensis
- Hypselostoma megaphonum
- Hypselostoma perigyra
- Truncatellina lussinensis
- Vertigo moulinsiana
- Vertigo parcedentata

===== Vitrinidae =====
- Oligolimax musignani
- Phenacolimax blanci
- Plutonia albopalliata
- Plutonia dianae
- Sardovitrina polloneriana

===== Zonitidae =====
- Allaegopis subariedeli
- Doraegopis carinatus
- Doraegopis parnonicus
- Doraegopis subaii
- Trochomorpha abrochroa
- Trochomorpha accurata
- Zonites algirus
- Zonites anaphiensis
- Zonites nikariae
- Zonites nisyrius
- Zonites pergranulatus
- Zonites sariae

== Nemertina ==
=== Enopla ===
==== Hoplonemertea ====
===== Prosorhochmidae =====
- Katechonemertes nightingaleensis

== Onychophora ==
=== Onychophora ===
==== Onychophora ====
===== Peripatopsidae =====
- Peripatoides indigo
- Peripatoides suteri
- Peripatopsis alba
- Peripatopsis clavigera
