= List of Diacyclops species =

This is a list of 120 species in Diacyclops, a genus of cyclopoid copepods in the family Cyclopidae.

== Diacyclops species ==
- Diacyclops abyssicola (Lilljeborg, 1901)^{c g}
- Diacyclops alabamensis J. W. Reid, 1992^{i c g}
- Diacyclops albus J. W. Reid, 1992^{i c g}
- Diacyclops alticola (Kiefer, 1935)^{c g}
- Diacyclops andinus Locascio de Mitrovich & Menu-Marque, 2001^{c g}
- Diacyclops antrincola Kiefer, 1967^{c g}
- Diacyclops arenosus (Mazepova, 1950)^{c g}
- Diacyclops badeniae Kiefer, 1958^{c g}
- Diacyclops balearicus Lescher-Moutoué, 1978^{c g}
- Diacyclops belgicus Kiefer, 1936^{g}
- Diacyclops bernardi (Petkovski, 1986)^{i c g}
- Diacyclops biceri Boxshall, Evstigneeva & Clark, 1993^{c g}
- Diacyclops bicuspidatus (Claus, 1857)^{i c g}
- Diacyclops bisetosus (Rehberg, 1880)^{i c g}
- Diacyclops brevifurcus Ishida, 2006^{c g}
- Diacyclops chakan Fiers and Reid in Fiers et al., 1996^{i c g}
- Diacyclops charon (Kiefer, 1931)^{c g}
- Diacyclops chrisae J. W. Reid, 1992^{i c g}
- Diacyclops clandestinus (Yeatman, 1964)^{c g}
- Diacyclops cohabitatus Monchenko, 1980^{c g}
- Diacyclops cohabitus Monchenko, 1980^{g}
- Diacyclops conversus Reid, 2004^{c g}
- Diacyclops crassicaudis (G. O. Sars, 1863)^{i c g}
- Diacyclops crassicaudoides (Kiefer, 1928)^{c g}
- Diacyclops cristinae Pesce & Galassi, 1987^{c g}
- Diacyclops cryonastes Morton, 1985^{c g}
- Diacyclops danielopoli Pospisil & Stoch, 1999^{c g}
- Diacyclops dimorphus J. W. Reid and Strayer, 1994^{i c g}
- Diacyclops disjunctus Thallwitz, 1927^{c g}
- Diacyclops dispinosus Ishida, 1994^{c g}
- Diacyclops ecabensis Fiers, Ghenne & Suárez-Morales, 2000^{c g}
- Diacyclops einslei De Laurentiis, Pesce & Humphreys, 1999^{c g}
- Diacyclops ekmani (Lindberg, 1950)^{c g}
- Diacyclops elegans (Mazepova, 1962)^{c g}
- Diacyclops eriophori Gurney, 1927^{c g}
- Diacyclops eulitoralis Alekseev & Arov, 1986^{c g}
- Diacyclops felix Pospisil & Stoch, 1999^{c g}
- Diacyclops fontinalis Naidenov, 1969^{c g}
- Diacyclops galbinus (Mazepova, 1962)^{c g}
- Diacyclops gauthieri Green, 1962^{c g}
- Diacyclops goticus (Kiefer, 1931)^{g}
- Diacyclops hanguk Karanovic, Grygier & Lee, 2013^{c g}
- Diacyclops harryi J. W. Reid, 1992^{i c g}
- Diacyclops haueri (Kiefer, 1931)^{i c g}
- Diacyclops hispidus Reid, 1988^{c g}
- Diacyclops hisuta Karanovic, Grygier & Lee, 2013^{c g}
- Diacyclops humphreysi Pesce & De Laurentiis, 1996^{c g}
- Diacyclops hypnicola (Gurney, 1927)^{i c g}
- Diacyclops hypogeus Kiefer, 1930^{c g}
- Diacyclops ichnusae Pesce & Galassi, 1986^{c g}
- Diacyclops ichnusoides Petkovski & Karanovic, 1997^{c g}
- Diacyclops imparilis Monchenko, 1985^{c g}
- Diacyclops improcerus (Mazepova, 1950)^{c g}
- Diacyclops incolotaenia (Mazepova, 1950)^{c g}
- Diacyclops indianensis Reid, 2004^{c g}
- Diacyclops insularis Monchenko, 1982^{c g}
- Diacyclops intermedius (Mazepova, 1952)^{c g}
- Diacyclops iranicus Pesce & Maggi, 1982^{c g}
- Diacyclops ishidai Karanovic, Grygier & Lee, 2013^{c g}
- Diacyclops italianus (Kiefer, 1931)^{g}
- Diacyclops jasnitskii (Mazepova, 1950)^{c g}
- Diacyclops jeanneli (Chappuis, 1929)^{i c g}
- Diacyclops joycei Karanovic, Gibson, Hawes, Andersen & Stevens, 2014^{c g}
- Diacyclops jurenei Parveen, Mahoon & Saleem, 1988^{c g}
- Diacyclops karamani (Kiefer, 1932)^{c g}
- Diacyclops kaupi Karanovic, Gibson, Hawes, Andersen & Stevens, 2014^{c g}
- Diacyclops konstantini (Mazepova, 1962)^{c g}
- Diacyclops kyotensis ItoTak, 1964^{c g}
- Diacyclops landei (Mahoon & Zia, 1985)^{c g}
- Diacyclops languidoides (Lilljeborg, 1901)^{i}
- Diacyclops languidulus (Willey, 1925)^{c g}
- Diacyclops languidus (G. O. Sars, 1863)^{i}
- Diacyclops leeae Karanovic, Grygier & Lee, 2013^{c g}
- Diacyclops lewisi Reid, 2004^{c g}
- Diacyclops limnobius Kiefer, 1978^{c g}
- Diacyclops lindae Pesce, 1984^{c g}
- Diacyclops longifurcus (Shen & Sung, 1963)^{c g}
- Diacyclops maggii Pesce & Galassi, 1987^{c g}
- Diacyclops michaelseni (Mrazek, 1901)^{c g}
- Diacyclops mirnyi (Borutsky & Vinogradov, 1957)^{c g}
- Diacyclops nagatoensis ItoTak, 1964^{c g}
- Diacyclops nanus (G. O. Sars, 1863)^{i}
- Diacyclops navus (Herrick, 1882)^{i c g}
- Diacyclops nearcticus (Kiefer, 1934)^{i c g}
- Diacyclops neglectus Flössner, 1984^{c g}
- Diacyclops nikolasarburni Suárez-Morales, Mercado-Salas & Barlow, 2013^{c g}
- Diacyclops nuragicus Pesce & Galassi, 1986^{c g}
- Diacyclops odessanus (Shmankevich, 1875)^{c g}
- Diacyclops palustris J. W. Reid, 1988^{i c g}
- Diacyclops paolae Pesce & Galassi, 1987^{c g}
- Diacyclops parahanguk Karanovic, Grygier & Lee, 2013^{c g}
- Diacyclops paralanguidoides Pesce & Galassi, 1987^{c g}
- Diacyclops parasuoensis Karanovic, Grygier & Lee, 2013^{c g}
- Diacyclops pelagonicus Petkovski, 1971^{c g}
- Diacyclops pilosus Fiers, Ghenne & Suárez-Morales, 2000^{c g}
- Diacyclops pseudosuoensis Karanovic, Grygier & Lee, 2013^{c g}
- Diacyclops puuc Fiers in Fiers et al., 1996^{i c g}
- Diacyclops reidae De Laurentiis, Pesce & Humphreys, 1999^{c g}
- Diacyclops ruffoi Kiefer, 1981^{g}
- Diacyclops salisae Reid, 2004^{c g}
- Diacyclops sardous Pesce & Galassi, 1987^{c g}
- Diacyclops scanloni Karanovic, 2006^{c g}
- Diacyclops skopljensis (Kiefer, 1932)^{c g}
- Diacyclops slovenicus Petkovski, 1954^{c g}
- Diacyclops sobeprolatus Karanovic, 2006^{c g}
- Diacyclops sororum J. W. Reid, 1992^{i c g}
- Diacyclops spongicola (Mazepova, 1962)^{c g}
- Diacyclops suoensis ItoTak, 1954^{c g}
- Diacyclops talievi (Mazepova, 1970)^{c g}
- Diacyclops tantalus Kiefer, 1937^{c g}
- Diacyclops tenuispinalis Shen & Sung, 1963^{c g}
- Diacyclops thomasi (S. A. Forbes, 1882)^{i c g b}
- Diacyclops trajani Reid & Strayer, 1994^{c g}
- Diacyclops uruguayensis (Kiefer, 1935)^{c g}
- Diacyclops versutus (Mazepova, 1961)^{c g}
- Diacyclops virginianus Reid, 1993^{c g}
- Diacyclops walkeri Karanovic, Gibson, Hawes, Andersen & Stevens, 2014^{c g}
- Diacyclops yeatmani J. W. Reid, 1988^{i c g}
- Diacyclops zhimulevi Sheveleva, Timoshkin, Aleksandrov & Tereza, 2010^{c g}
- Diacyclops zschokkei (Graeter, 1910)^{c g}

Data sources: i = ITIS, c = Catalogue of Life, g = GBIF, b = Bugguide.net
