= Acanthocyclops fonticulus =

Scientific classification
- Domain: Eukaryota
- Kingdom: Animalia
- Phylum: Arthropoda
- Class: Copepoda
- Order: Cyclopoida
- Family: Cyclopidae
- Genus: Acanthocyclops
- Species: A. fonticulus

Binomial name
- Acanthocyclops fonticulus Lee & Chang, 2007

Species of crustacean

Acanthocyclops fonticulus is a species of copepod in the family Cyclopidae. It was first described in 2007 by Ji Min Lee and Cheon Young Chang.

The species is endemic to Korea, where it has been found in springs in mountain valleys or in caves, in Gangwon-do, Chungcheongbuk-do, and on Muhaksan in Gyeongsangnam-do and in Jeollanam-do on Jirisan. It is a freshwater species.
