= Microcyclops =

Scientific classification
- Domain: Eukaryota
- Kingdom: Animalia
- Phylum: Arthropoda
- Class: Copepoda
- Order: Cyclopoida
- Family: Cyclopidae
- Genus: Microcyclops; Claus, 1893

Synonyms
- Cryptocyclops Sars G.O., 1927; Cyclops (Microcyclops) Claus, 1893

Genus of crustaceans

Microcyclops is a genus of copepods, containing the following species:

- Microcyclops afghanicus Lindberg, 1948
- Microcyclops alius (Kiefer, 1935)
- Microcyclops anceps (Richard, 1897)
- Microcyclops anninae (Menzel, 1926)
- Microcyclops arenicola Kiefer, 1960
- Microcyclops assimilis (Sars G.O., 1927)
- Microcyclops atongae Fryer, 1957
- Microcyclops attenuatus (Sars G.O., 1909)
- Microcyclops bicolor (Sars G.O., 1863)
- Microcyclops caudatus (Sars G.O., 1927)
- Microcyclops ceibaensis (Marsh, 1919)
- Microcyclops crassipes (Sars G.O., 1927)
- Microcyclops cunningtoni (Sars G.O., 1909)
- Microcyclops davidi (Chappuis, 1922)
- Microcyclops diaphanus (Fischer, 1853)
- Microcyclops diversus (Kiefer, 1935)
- Microcyclops dubitabilis (Kiefer, 1934)
- Microcyclops echinatus Fiers, Ghenne & Suárez-Morales, 2000
- Microcyclops elegans Dussart & Fernando, 1985
- Microcyclops elgonensis (Kiefer, 1932)
- Microcyclops elongatus (Lowndes, 1934)
- Microcyclops exiguus (Sars G.O., 1909)
- Microcyclops falsus (Kiefer, 1929)
- Microcyclops finitimus Dussart, 1984
- Microcyclops gemellus Gurney, 1928
- Microcyclops inarmatus Gutiérrez-Aguirre & Cervantes-Martínez, 2016
- Microcyclops inchoatus Shen & Sung, 1965
- Microcyclops indolusitanus (Lindberg, 1938)
- Microcyclops inopinatus (Sars G.O., 1927)
- Microcyclops intermedius Shen & Tai, 1964
- Microcyclops javanus Kiefer, 1930
- Microcyclops jenkinae (Lowndes, 1933)
- Microcyclops karvei Kiefer & Moorthy, 1935
- Microcyclops levis (Kiefer, 1952)
- Microcyclops linjanticus (Kiefer, 1928)
- Microcyclops longiarticulatus Shen & Tai, 1964
- Microcyclops longiramus Shen & Sung, 1965
- Microcyclops longispinosus Shen & Tai, 1964
- Microcyclops margaretae (Lindberg, 1938)
- Microcyclops mediasetosus Dussart & Frutos, 1986
- Microcyclops medius Dussart & Frutos, 1986
- Microcyclops microsetus Yeatman, 1983
- Microcyclops moghulensis (Lindberg, 1939)
- Microcyclops nyasae (Fryer, 1957)
- Microcyclops obscuratus Fryer, 1956
- Microcyclops pachycomus (Sars G.O., 1909)
- Microcyclops paraplesius (Kiefer, 1929)
- Microcyclops pseudoopercularis Lindberg, 1957
- Microcyclops pumilis Pennak & Ward, 1985
- Microcyclops rechtyae Lindberg, 1960
- Microcyclops richardi (Lindberg, 1942)
- Microcyclops robustus Shen & Sung, 1965
- Microcyclops rubelloides Kiefer, 1952
- Microcyclops rubellus (Lilljeborg, 1901)
- Microcyclops semilunaris Lindberg, 1952
- Microcyclops subaequalis (Kiefer, 1928)
- Microcyclops sumatranus (Kiefer, 1933)
- Microcyclops symoensi (Kiefer, 1956)
- Microcyclops tanganicae Gurney, 1928
- Microcyclops tricolor (Lindberg, 1937)
- Microcyclops triumvirorum Kiefer, 1935
- Microcyclops uenoi Kiefer, 1937
- Microcyclops uviranus (Kiefer, 1958)
- Microcyclops variabilis Dussart & Sarnita, 1986
- Microcyclops varicans (Sars G.O., 1863)

- Microcyclops arnaudi (Sars G.O., 1908) → Metacyclops arnaudi (Sars G.O., 1908) → Pescecyclops arnaudi (Sars G.O., 1908)
- Microcyclops brevifurca (Lowndes, 1934) → Neutrocyclops brevifurca (Lowndes, 1934)
- Microcyclops dengizicus (Lepeshkin, 1900) → Apocyclops dengizicus dengizicus (Lepeshkin, 1900)
- Microcyclops exsulis (Gauthier, 1951) → Metacyclops exsulis (Gauthier, 1951)
- Microcyclops furcatus (Baird, 1837) → Tisbe furcata (Baird, 1837)
- Microcyclops gracilis (Lilljeborg, 1853) → Metacyclops gracilis gracilis (Lilljeborg, 1853)
- Microcyclops kentanensis (Harada, 1931) → Microcyclops linjanticus (Kiefer, 1928)
- Microcyclops laticornis (Lowndes, 1934) → Metacyclops laticornis (Lowndes, 1934)
- Microcyclops leptopus (Kiefer, 1927) → Metacyclops leptopus (Kiefer, 1927)
- Microcyclops mendocinus (Wierzejski, 1892) → Metacyclops mendocinus (Wierzejski, 1892)
- Microcyclops minimus (Kiefer, 1933) → Microcyclops elongatus (Lowndes, 1934)
- Microcyclops minutus Claus, 1863 → Metacyclops minutus (Claus, 1863)
- Microcyclops monacanthus (Kiefer, 1928) → Pescecyclops monacanthus (Kiefer, 1928)
- Microcyclops paludicola (Herbst, 1959) → Metacyclops paludicola (Herbst, 1959)
- Microcyclops panamensis (Marsh, 1913) → Apocyclops panamensis (Marsh, 1913)
- Microcyclops planus (Gurney, 1909) → Metacyclops planus (Gurney, 1909)
- Microcyclops postojnae (Brancelj, 1987) → Metacyclops postojnae Brancelj, 1987
- Microcyclops pseudoanceps Green, 1962 → Metacyclops pseudoanceps (Green, 1962)
- Microcyclops sydneyensis (Schmeil, 1898) → Australocyclops australis (Sars G.O., 1896)
- Microcyclops tredecimus (Lowndes, 1934) → Metacyclops tredecimus (Lowndes, 1934)
- Megacyclops robustus (G. O. Sars, 1863) → Acanthocyclops robustus (G. O. Sars, 1863)
- Megacyclops robustus (G. O. Sars, 1863) → Acanthocyclops robustus (G. O. Sars, 1863)
