= Acanthocyclops tokchokensis =

Scientific classification
- Domain: Eukaryota
- Kingdom: Animalia
- Phylum: Arthropoda
- Class: Copepoda
- Order: Cyclopoida
- Family: Cyclopidae
- Genus: Acanthocyclops
- Species: A. tokchokensis

Binomial name
- Acanthocyclops tokchokensis Kim & Chang, 1991

Species of crustacean

Acanthocyclops tokchokensis is a species of copepod in the family Cyclopidae. It was first described in 1991 by H.-S. Kim and Cheon Young Chang.

The species is endemic to Korea, where it has been found in groundwater springs in Deokjeokdo, Gyeonggi-do and Gyeongju, and Gyeongsangbuk-do.
