= Tropocyclops federensis =

Conservation status
- Vulnerable (IUCN 2.3)

Scientific classification
- Kingdom: Animalia
- Phylum: Arthropoda
- Class: Copepoda
- Order: Cyclopoida
- Family: Cyclopidae
- Genus: Tropocyclops
- Species: T. federensis

Binomial name
- Tropocyclops federensis Reid, 1991

Species of crustacean

Tropocyclops federensis is a species of crustacean in the family Cyclopidae. It is endemic to Brazil. Its natural habitat is freshwater lakes.
