= Dussartcyclops mortoni =

Scientific classification
- Kingdom: Animalia
- Phylum: Arthropoda
- Clade: Pancrustacea
- Class: Copepoda
- Order: Cyclopoida
- Family: Cyclopidae
- Genus: Dussartcyclops
- Species: D. mortoni

Binomial name
- Dussartcyclops mortoni (Karanovic, 2004)
- Holotype site: Western Australia

Synonyms
- Goniocyclops mortoni Karanovic, 2004; Dussartcyclops (Dussartcyclops) mortoni (Karanovic, 2004)

Species of crustaceans

Dussartcyclops mortoni is a species of copepod in the family, Cyclopidae, and was first described as Goniocyclops uniarticulatus in 2004 by Tomislav Karanovic. In 2011, Karanovic, Stefan Eberhard and A. Murdoch, assigned it to the new genus, Dussartcyclops.

It is a freshwater copepod species, found in subterranean wells and bores in arid Western Australia.
