= Dussartcyclops uniarticulatus =

Scientific classification
- Kingdom: Animalia
- Phylum: Arthropoda
- Clade: Pancrustacea
- Class: Copepoda
- Order: Cyclopoida
- Family: Cyclopidae
- Genus: Dussartcyclops
- Species: D. uniarticulatus

Binomial name
- Dussartcyclops uniarticulatus (Karanovic, 2004)
- Holotype site: Western Australia

Synonyms
- Goniocyclops uniarticulatus Karanovic, 2004; Dussartcyclops (Dussartcyclops) uniarticulatus (Karanovic, 2004)

Species of crustaceans

Dussartcyclops uniarticulatus is a species of copepod in the family, Cyclopidae, and was first described as Goniocyclops uniarticulatus in 2004 by Tomislav Karanovic. In 2011, Karanovic, Stefan Eberhard and A. Murdoch, assigned it to the new genus, Dussartcyclops.

It is the type species of the genus, Dussartcyclops, and of its subgenus, Dussartcyclops (Dussartcyclops).

It is a freshwater copepod species, found in subterranean wells and bores in arid Western Australia.
