= Diacyclops uruguayensis =

Scientific classification
- Domain: Eukaryota
- Kingdom: Animalia
- Phylum: Arthropoda
- Class: Copepoda
- Order: Cyclopoida
- Family: Cyclopidae
- Genus: Diacyclops
- Species: D. uruguayensis

Binomial name
- Diacyclops uruguayensis (Kiefer, 1935)

Species of crustacean

Diacyclops uruguayensis is a species of freshwater copepod belonging to the family Cyclopidae. It was first described by Friedrich Kiefer in 1935.

== Taxonomy ==
This is part of the genus Diacyclops, which includes numerous species of freshwater copepods.

== Distribution ==
It was originally described from pools near Montevideo, Uruguay. Subsequent studies have recorded its presence in other regions, including parts of Brazil, such as Santa Catarina and Ceará, suggesting a broader distribution than initially recognized.
