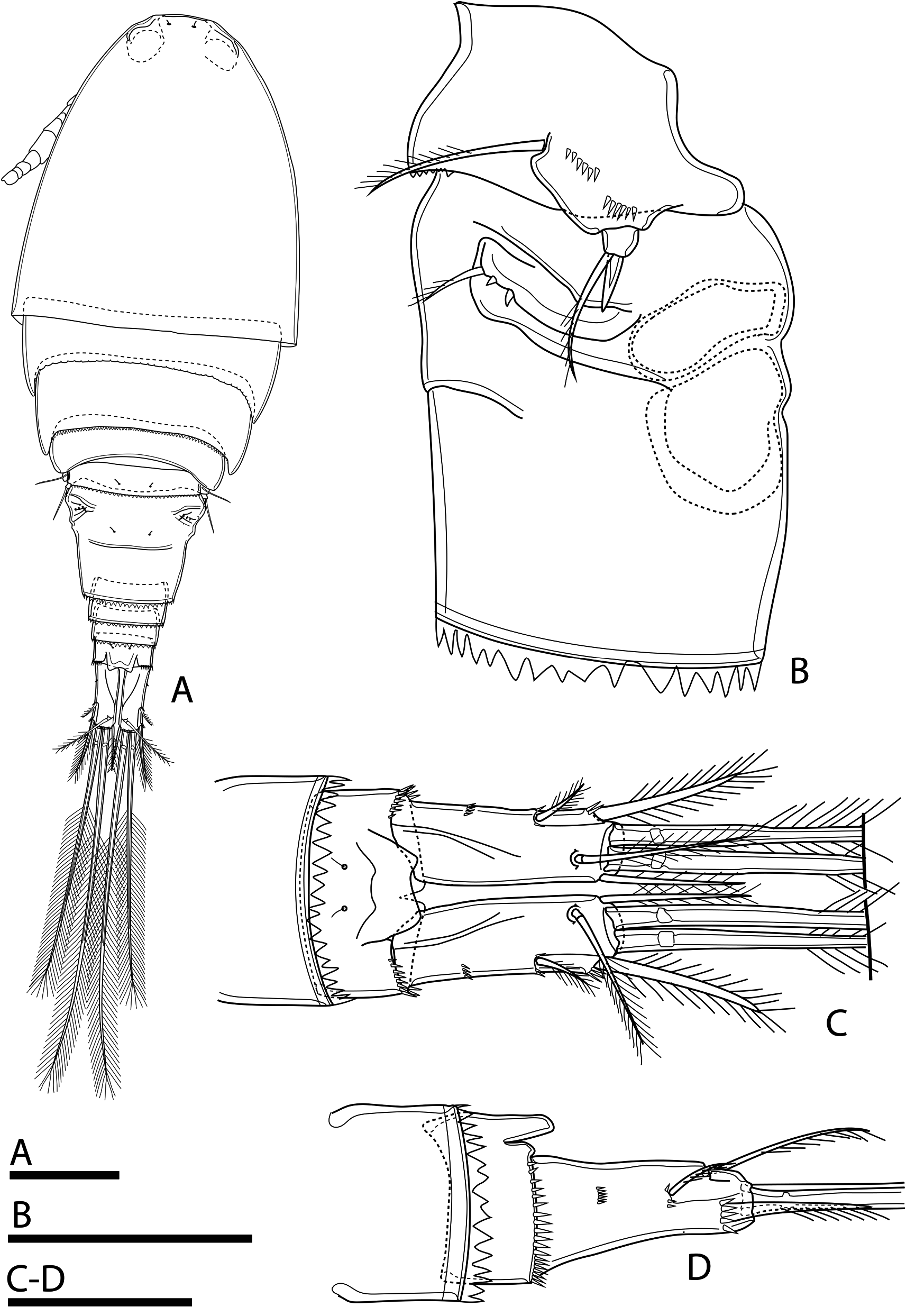
- Metacyclops brancelji

Scientific classification
- Kingdom: Animalia
- Phylum: Arthropoda
- Clade: Pancrustacea
- Class: Copepoda
- Order: Cyclopoida
- Family: Cyclopidae
- Genus: Metacyclops; Kiefer, 1927

= Metacyclops =

Genus of crustaceans

Metacyclops is a genus of copepod crustaceans in the family Cyclopidae containing 61 species, of which three are listed on the IUCN Red List – M. campestris from Brazil (conservation dependent), M. gasparoi from Italy (vulnerable), and M. postojnae from Slovenia (vulnerable).

- Metacyclops aequatorialis Dussart, 1978
- Metacyclops agnitus Herbst, 1988
- Metacyclops amicitiae Kolaczynski, 2015
- Metacyclops amoenus (Mann, 1940)
- Metacyclops botosaneanui Pesce, 1985
- Metacyclops brauni Herbst, 1962
- Metacyclops campestris Reid, 1987
- Metacyclops chelazzii Dumont, 1981
- Metacyclops communis Lindberg, 1938
- Metacyclops concavus Kiefer, 1937
- Metacyclops curtispinosus Dussart, 1984
- Metacyclops cushae Reid, 1991
- Metacyclops dengizicus (Lepeshkin, 1900)
- Metacyclops dentatus Plesa, 1981
- Metacyclops denticulatus Dussart & Frutos, 1986
- Metacyclops deserticus Mercado-Salas & Suárez-Morales, 2013
- Metacyclops dianae Pesce, 1985
- Metacyclops exsulis (Gauthier, 1951)
- Metacyclops gasparoi Stoch, 1987
- Metacyclops geltrudeae Galassi & Pesce, 1994
- Metacyclops gracilis (Lilljeborg, 1853)
- Metacyclops grandis (Kiefer, 1935)
- Metacyclops grandispinifer (Lindberg, 1940)
- Metacyclops hannensis Defaye, 1993
- Metacyclops hartmanni Herbst, 1960
- Metacyclops hirsutus C. E. F. Rocha, 1994
- Metacyclops janstocki Herbst, 1990
- Metacyclops laticornis (Lowndes, 1934)
- Metacyclops leptopus (Kiefer, 1927)
- Metacyclops longimaxillis Defaye & Por, 2010
- Metacyclops lusitanus Lindberg, 1961
- Metacyclops malayicus Kiefer, 1930
- Metacyclops margaretae Lindberg, 1938
- Metacyclops mendocinus (Wierzejski, 1892)
- Metacyclops micropus Kiefer, 1932
- Metacyclops minutus (Claus, 1863)
- Metacyclops mortoni Pesce, De Laurentiis & Humphreys, 1996
- Metacyclops mutatus Herbst, 1988
- Metacyclops necessarius (Kiefer, 1926)
- Metacyclops oraemaris C. E. F. Rocha, 1994
- Metacyclops paludicola (Herbst, 1959)
- Metacyclops pectiniatus Shen & Tai, 1964
- Metacyclops planus (Gurney, 1909)
- Metacyclops postojnae Brancelj, 1987
- Metacyclops problematicus Dumont, 1973
- Metacyclops prolatus Kiefer, 1935
- Metacyclops pseudoanceps (Green, 1962)
- Metacyclops rudis Plesa, 1981
- Metacyclops ryukyuensis Ishida, 1995
- Metacyclops somalicus Dumont, 1981
- Metacyclops stammeri Kiefer, 1938
- Metacyclops subaequalis Dussart, 1984
- Metacyclops subdolus Kiefer, 1938
- Metacyclops superincidentis Karanovic, 2004
- Metacyclops thailandicus Boonyanusith, Sanoamuang & Brancelj, 2018
- Metacyclops tredecimus (Lowndes, 1934)
- Metacyclops trisetosus Herbst, 1957
- Metacyclops trispinosus Dumont, 1981
- Metacyclops tropicus (Kiefer, 1932)
- Metacyclops unacanthus Lindberg, 1936
- Metacyclops woni Lee & Chang, 2015

- Metacyclops arenicolus Fryer, 1956 → Allocyclops arenicolus (Fryer, 1956)
- Metacyclops arnaudi (Sars G.O., 1908) → Pescecyclops arnaudi (Sars G.O., 1908)
- Metacyclops dimorphus (Kiefer, 1934) → Apocyclops dimorphus (Kiefer, 1934)
- Metacyclops distans Kiefer, 1956 → Apocyclops distans (Kiefer, 1956)
- Metacyclops fiersi De Laurentiis, Pesce & Humphreys, 2001 → Fierscyclops fiersi (De Laurentiis, Pesce & Humphreys, 2001)
- Metacyclops kimberleyi Karanovic, 2004 → Pescecyclops kimberleyi (Karanovic, 2004)
- Metacyclops laurentiisae Karanovic, 2004 → Pescecyclops laurentiisae (Karanovic, 2004)
- Metacyclops monacanthus (Kiefer, 1928) → Pescecyclops monacanthus (Kiefer, 1928)
- Metacyclops panamensis (Marsh, 1913) → Apocyclops panamensis (Marsh, 1913)
- Metacyclops pilanus Karanovic, 2004 → Pescecyclops pilanus (Karanovic, 2004)
- Metacyclops pilbaricus Karanovic, 2004 → Pescecyclops pilbaricus (Karanovic, 2004)
- Metacyclops procerus (Herbst, 1955) → Apocyclops procerus (Herbst, 1955)
- Metacyclops royi Lindberg, 1940 → Apocyclops royi (Lindberg, 1940)
- Metacyclops spartinus (Ruber, 1966) → Apocyclops spartinus (Ruber, 1968)
- Metacyclops stocki Pesce, 1985 → Hesperocyclops stocki (Pesce, 1985)
- Metacyclops viduus (Kiefer, 1933) → Apocyclops viduus (Kiefer, 1933)
