= Proud Flesh =

Proud Flesh may refer to:

- Granulation tissue
- Proud Flesh (film), a 1925 film directed by King Vidor
- "Proud Flesh", an episode of Law & Order: Criminal Intent (season 5)
- Proud Flesh, an album by Matrix (band)
- Proud Flesh, a book of photographs by Sally Mann
- Proud Flesh, a novel by William Humphrey
- Proud Flesh, a verse play by Robert Penn Warren that was the basis for his 1946 novel All the King's Men
- Neoregelia 'Proud Flesh', a cultivar of Neoregelia concentrica
