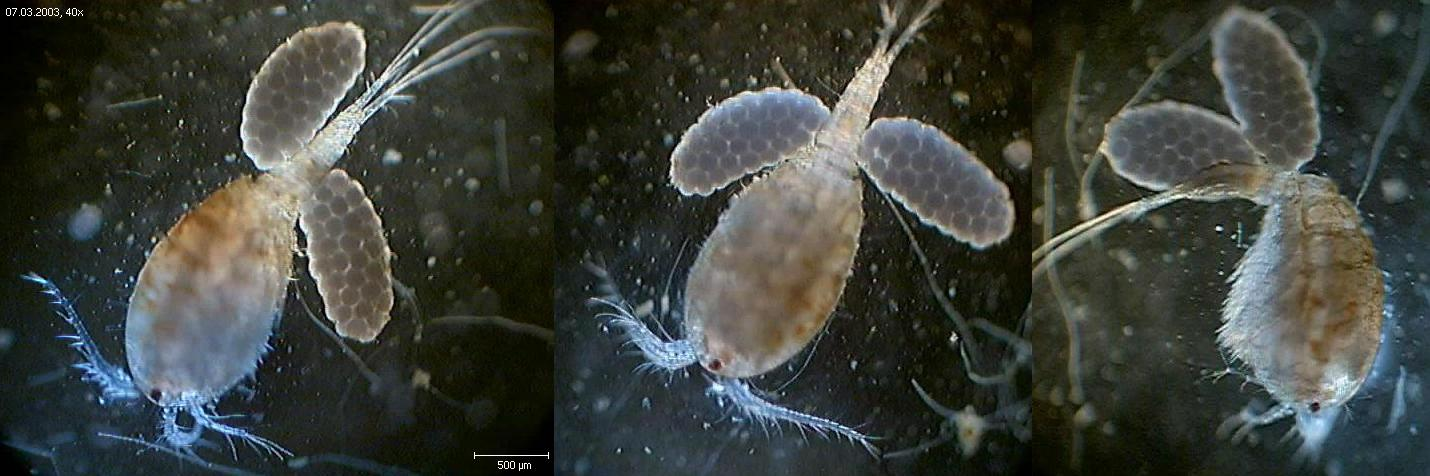

Scientific classification
- Domain: Eukaryota
- Kingdom: Animalia
- Phylum: Arthropoda
- Class: Copepoda
- Order: Cyclopoida
- Family: Cyclopidae
- Genus: Macrocyclops
- Species: M. albidus

Binomial name
- Macrocyclops albidus (Jurine, 1820)

= Macrocyclops albidus =

Species of crustacean

Macrocyclops albidus is a larvivorous copepod species.

== Ecology ==
It makes its habitat in still fresh waters such as in residential roadside ditches, pools, ponds, and other environments with sufficient food supply.

Macrocyclopsis feed on mosquito larvae. Macrocyclops albidus has proven highly efficient in controlling mosquitoes, reaching close to 90% reduction in larval survival under field conditions and exceeding the recommended predation rates for effective mosquito control in laboratory experiments. In laboratory studies, the common Macrocyclopsis killed an average of 27 first-instar Culex quinquefasciatus larvae/copepod/day.

Macrocyclops albidus is a known intermediate host for the hermaphroditic parasite Schistocephalus solidus, a tapeworm of fish and fish-eating birds.

== Classification ==
Macrocyclops is a member of Crustacea: Copepoda. The genus Macrocyclops is characterized by a fifth leg of two distinct segments, the distal segment bearing three spines or setae on its terminal end. Macrocyclops albidus is distinguished by the bare medial surface of the caudal rami and the hyaline membrane on the last segment of the antennule, which is smooth or finely serrated.
