= Afrocyclops gibsoni =

Scientific classification
- Domain: Eukaryota
- Kingdom: Animalia
- Phylum: Arthropoda
- Class: Copepoda
- Order: Cyclopoida
- Family: Cyclopidae
- Genus: Afrocyclops
- Species: A. gibsoni

Binomial name
- Afrocyclops gibsoni (Brady, 1904)

Species of crustacean

Afrocyclops gibsoni is a species of copepod in the family Cyclopidae. Three subspecies have been identified:

- Afrocyclops gibsoni abbreviatus Kiefer, 1933
- Afrocyclops gibsoni doryphorus (Kiefer, 1935)
- Afrocyclops gibsoni ondoensis (Kiefer, 1952)
