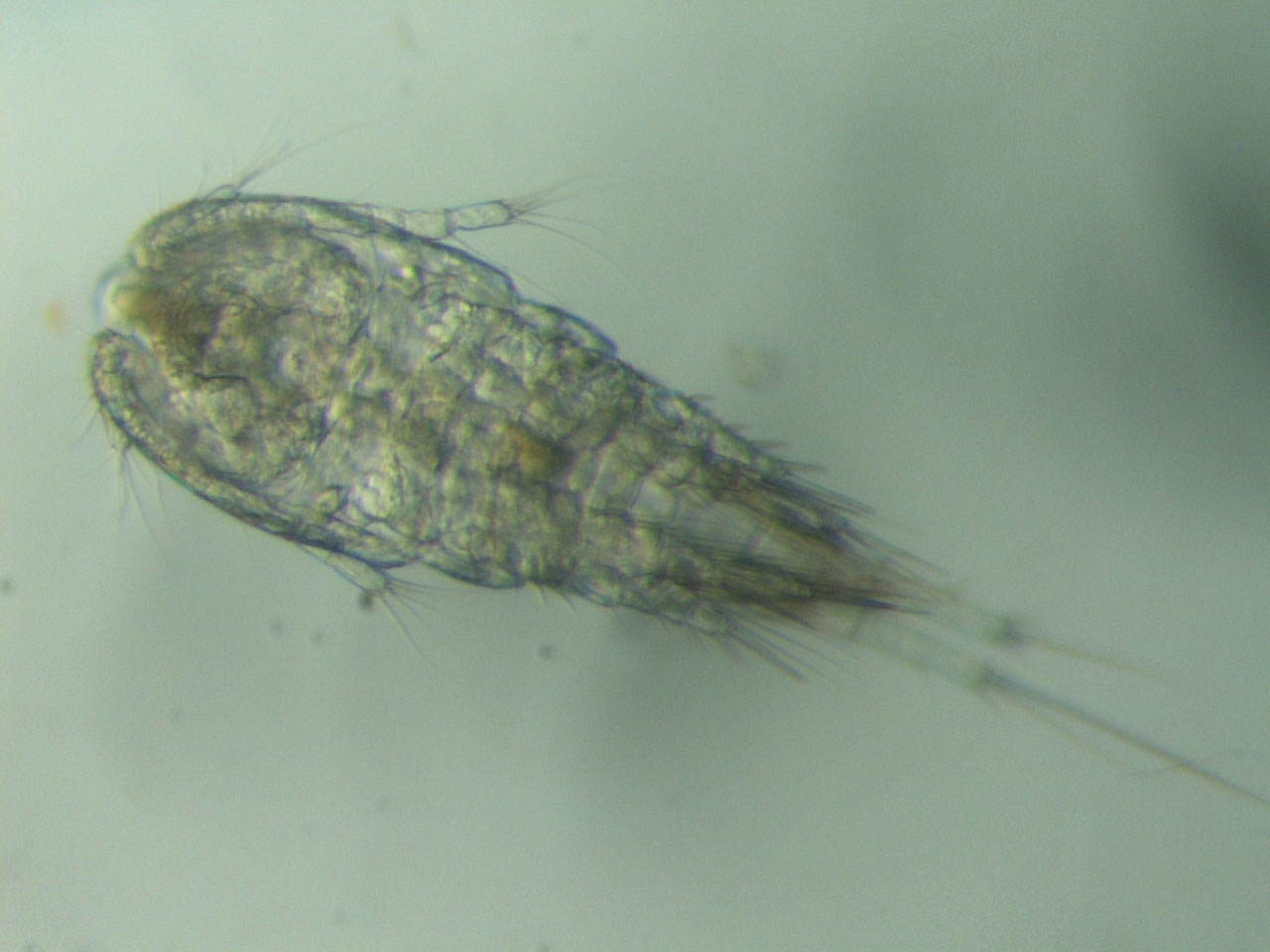

Scientific classification
- Domain: Eukaryota
- Kingdom: Animalia
- Phylum: Arthropoda
- Class: Copepoda
- Order: Cyclopoida
- Family: Cyclopidae
- Genus: Diacyclops
- Species: D. thomasi

Binomial name
- Diacyclops thomasi (S. A. Forbes, 1882)

Synonyms
- Cyclops thomasi S. A. Forbes, 1882

= Diacyclops thomasi =

Species of crustacean

Diacyclops thomasi is a species of cyclopoid copepod in the family Cyclopidae.
