= Diacyclops trajani =

Scientific classification
- Domain: Eukaryota
- Kingdom: Animalia
- Phylum: Arthropoda
- Class: Copepoda
- Order: Cyclopoida
- Family: Cyclopidae
- Genus: Diacyclops
- Species: D. trajani

Binomial name
- Diacyclops trajani Reid & Strayer, 1994

Species of crustacean

Diacyclops trajani is a species of freshwater copepod in the family Cyclopidae, which is found in various parts of the world. This species is part of the genus Diacyclops.

== Description ==
Diacyclops trajani is a small freshwater copepod species with a characteristic body structure typical of the Cyclopoida order. It has been observed in various aquatic environments and is known for its role in freshwater ecosystems.

== Habitat ==
Diacyclops trajani is commonly found in freshwater habitats such as ponds, lakes, and slow-moving streams. It lives in clear waters and is often part of the planktonic community in these environments.

== Ecology ==
As a zooplankton, D. trajani plays a main role in the aquatic food web, serving as prey for larger organisms and contributing to the nutrient cycling within aquatic ecosystems.
