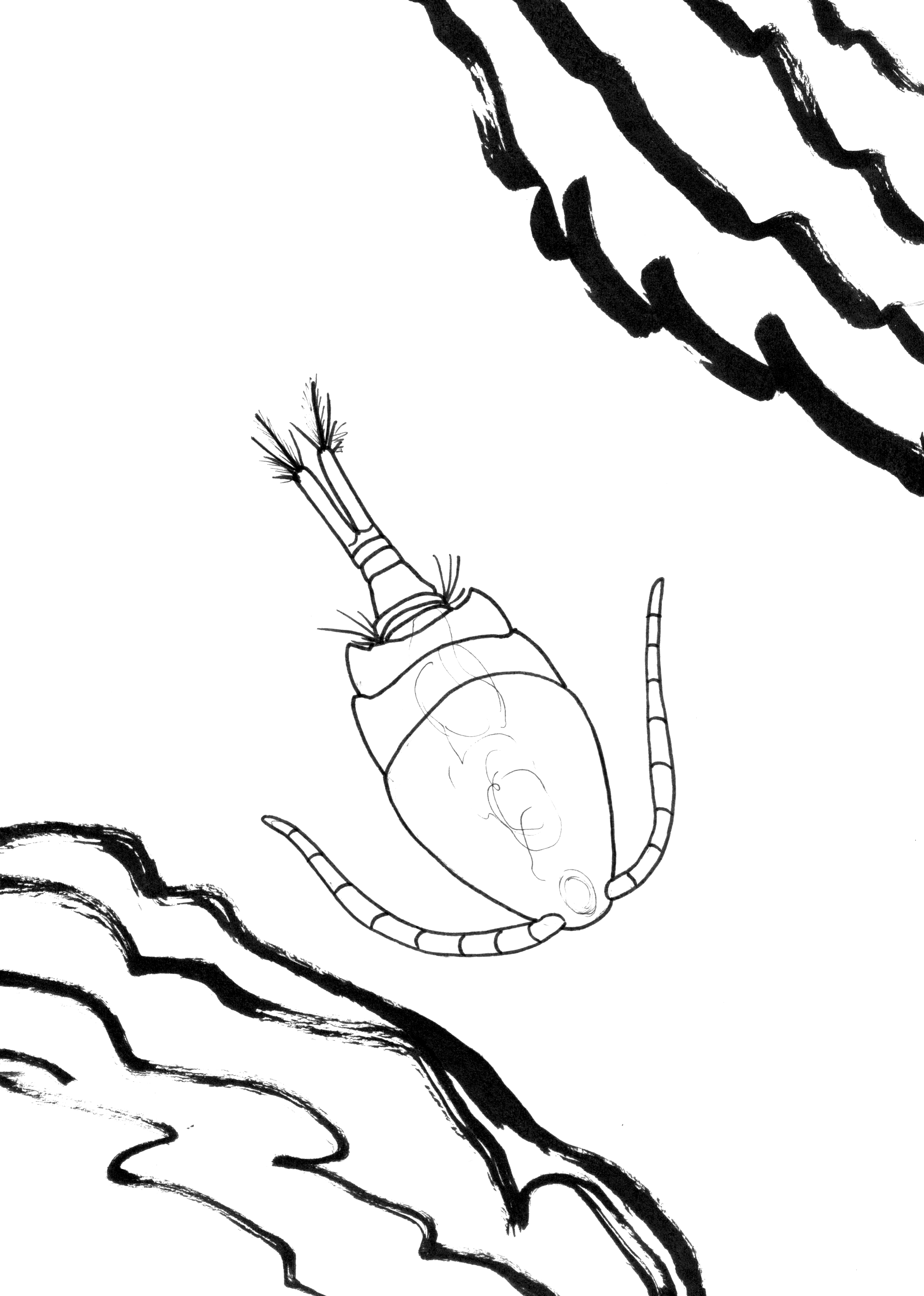
- Artist's reconstruction

Conservation status
- Extinct (IUCN 3.1)

Scientific classification
- Kingdom: Animalia
- Phylum: Arthropoda
- Class: Copepoda
- Order: Cyclopoida
- Family: Cyclopidae
- Genus: Afrocyclops
- Species: †A. pauliani

Binomial name
- †Afrocyclops pauliani Lindberg, 1951
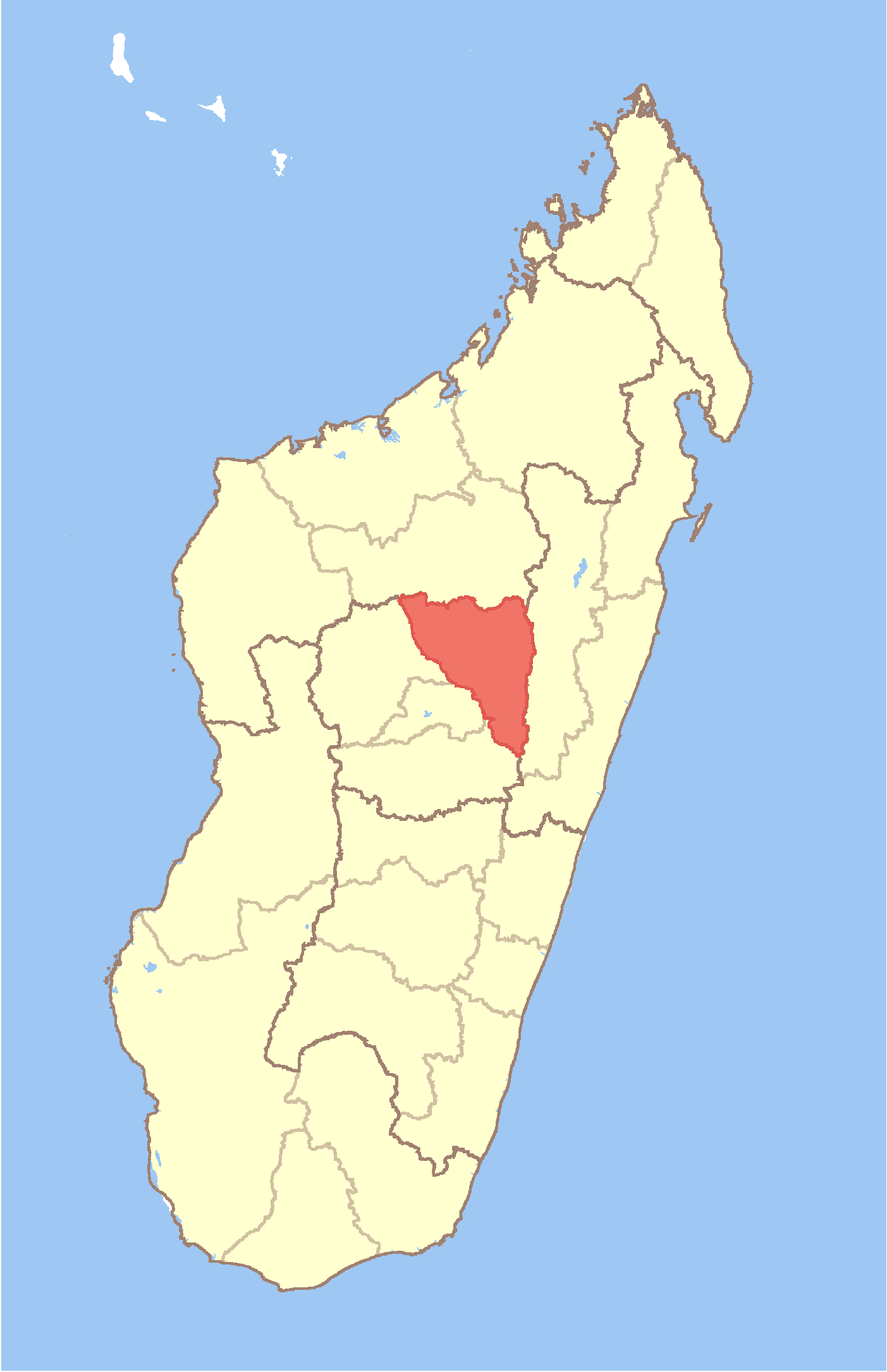
- Location of Analamanga Region, Madagascar

= Afrocyclops pauliani =

Extinct species of crustacean

Afrocyclops pauliani is an extinct species of copepod in the family Cyclopidae. A single specimen was discovered in 1949 in a small freshwater pool near Antananarivo, Madagascar, but the species has not been seen in collections since.
