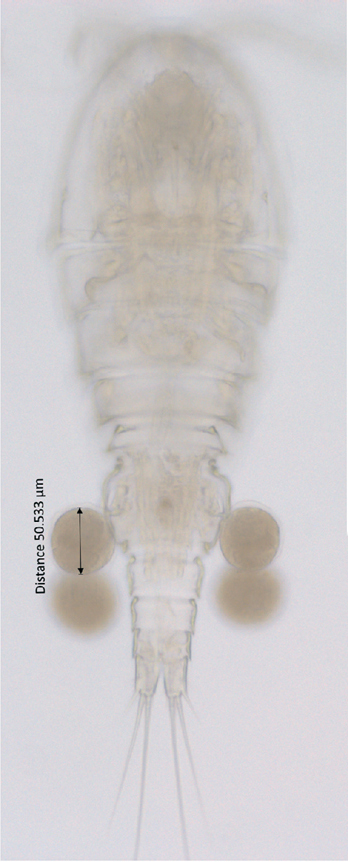
- Bryocyclops muscicola

Scientific classification
- Kingdom: Animalia
- Phylum: Arthropoda
- Class: Copepoda
- Order: Cyclopoida
- Family: Cyclopidae
- Genus: Bryocyclops; Kiefer, 1927

= Bryocyclops =

Genus of crustaceans

Bryocyclops is a genus of freshwater-dwelling cyclopoid copepods. The prefix Bryo- for Bryophyta (Mosses) refers to the fact that the first few species were described from mosses.

== Distribution ==
Species belonging to this genus are distributed in all major biogeographic realms except Antarctica, although there are only a handful of species from the Nearctic (B. muscicola) and Neotropical realm (B. campaneri and B. rochi). Researchers suspect that with increasing sampling efforts, more species will be discovered from these regions. Apart from continental habitats, some species occur on the oceanic islands of Guam, Fiji, Tonga, Samoa and Christmas Island. In recent years, five new species have been described from caves in Thailand.

== Habitat ==
As its name suggests, the type species was found in damp mosses. Apart from other microcrustaceans such as cladocerans, ostracods and harpacticoid copepods, only a few genera of cyclopoid copepods have managed to access semiterrestrial habitats like mosses, leaf litter, tree holes, leaf axils, bromeliads and other phytotelmata, or even man-made microhabitats (water-filled tin cans, car tires). These habitats pose serious challenges to fully aquatic organisms, especially since they rely on passive means of dispersal (phoresis). Species of the genus Bryocyclops also inhabit cave pools, groundwater and other freshwater bodies.

== Species ==
This genus currently contains 26 valid species:

- Bryocyclops (Palaeocyclops) jankowskajae Monchenko, 1972
- Bryocyclops absalomi Por, 1981
- Bryocyclops africanus Kiefer, 1932
- Bryocyclops ankaratranus Kiefer, 1954
- Bryocyclops anninae (Menzel, 1926)
- Bryocyclops apertus Kiefer, 1935
- Bryocyclops asetus Watiroyram, 2018
- Bryocyclops bogoriensis (Menzel, 1926)
- Bryocyclops campaneri Rocha & Bjornberg, 1987
- Bryocyclops caroli Bjornberg, 1985
- Bryocyclops chappuisi Kiefer, 1928
- Bryocyclops constrictus Lindberg, 1950
- Bryocyclops correctus Kiefer, 1960
- Bryocyclops difficilis Kiefer, 1935
- Bryocyclops elachistus Kiefer, 1935
- Bryocyclops fidjiensis Lindberg, 1954
- Bryocyclops jankowskajae Monchenko, 1972
- Bryocyclops maewaensis Watiroyram, Brancelj & Sanoamuang, 2012
- Bryocyclops maholarnensis Watiroyram, Brancelj & Sanoamuang, 2015
- Bryocyclops mandrakanus Kiefer, 1954
- Bryocyclops muscicola (Menzel, 1926)
- Bryocyclops muscicoloides Watiroyram, 2018
- Bryocyclops parvulus Kiefer, 1928
- Bryocyclops phyllopus Kiefer, 1935
- Bryocyclops trangensis Watiroyram, 2018
- Bryocyclops travancoricus Lindberg, 1947

== Gallery ==
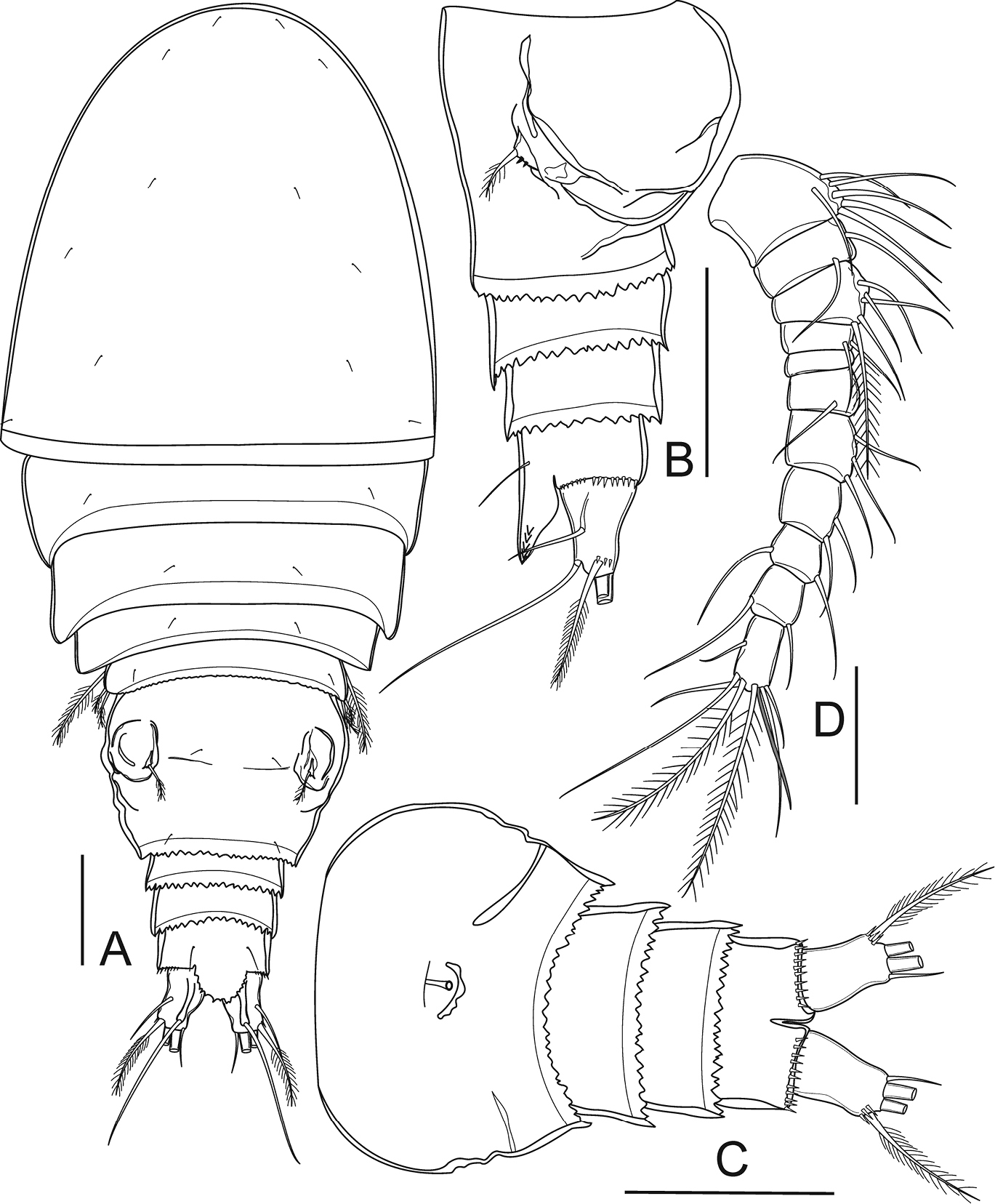
Bryocyclops asetus female

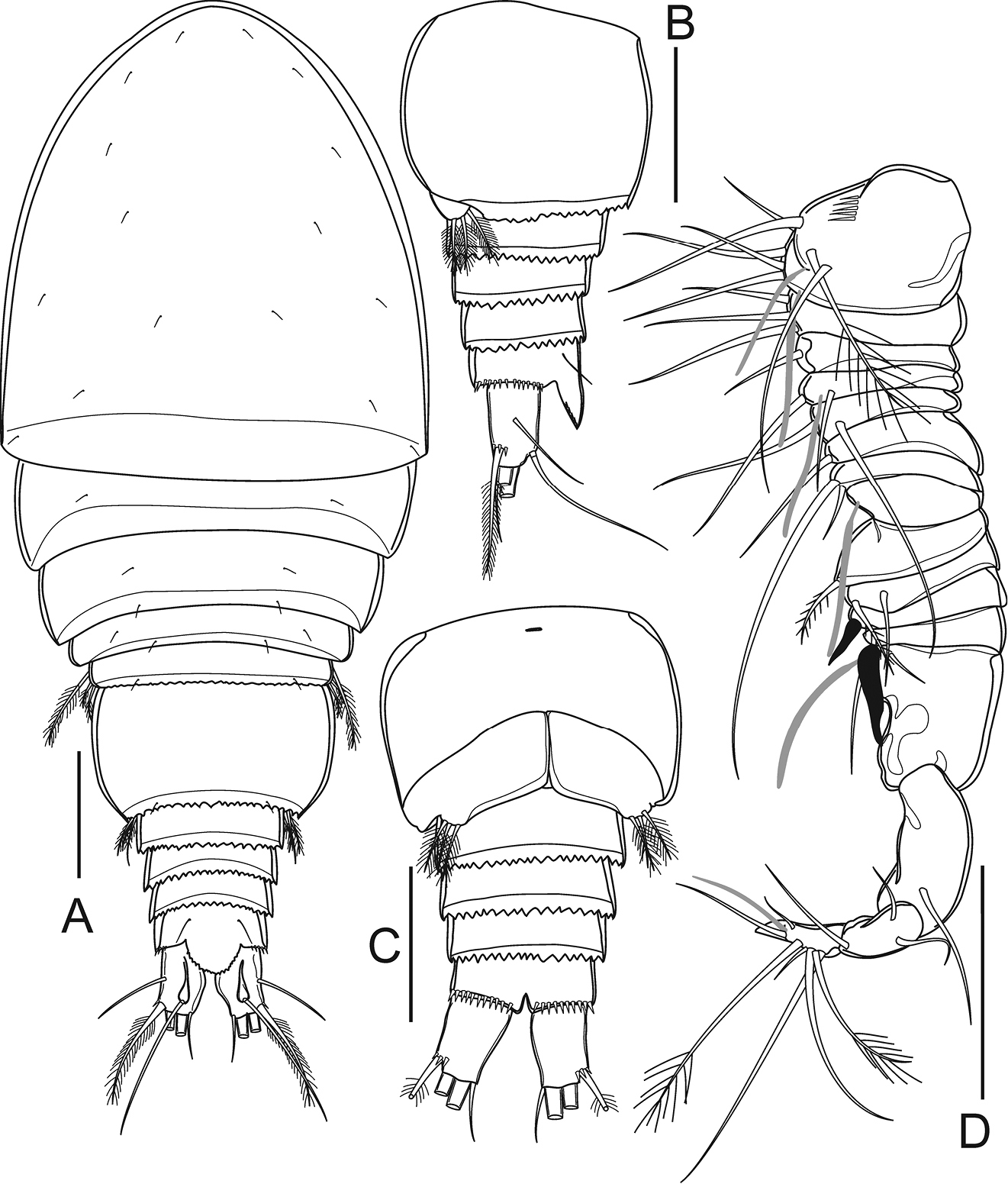
Bryocyclops asetus male

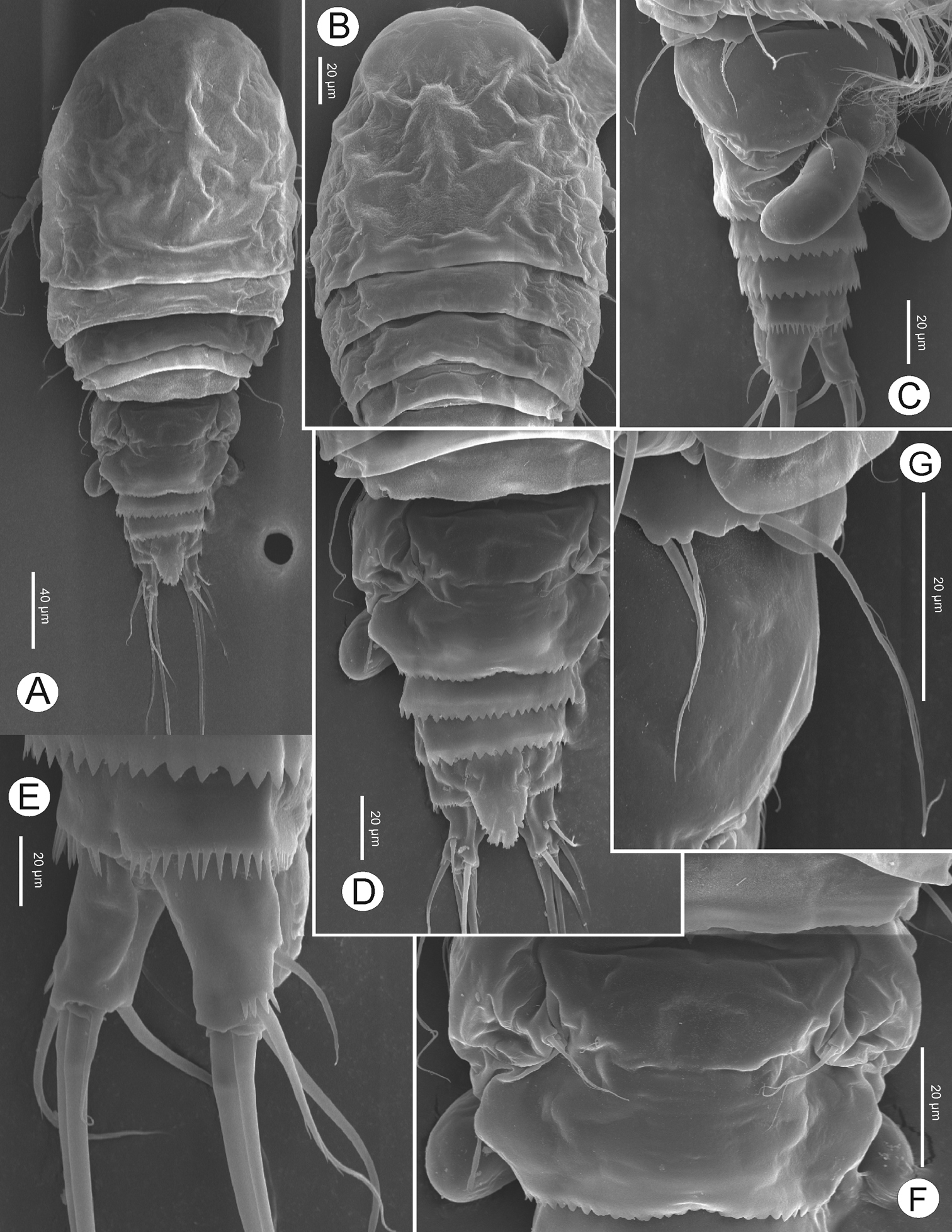
Bryocyclops asetus female

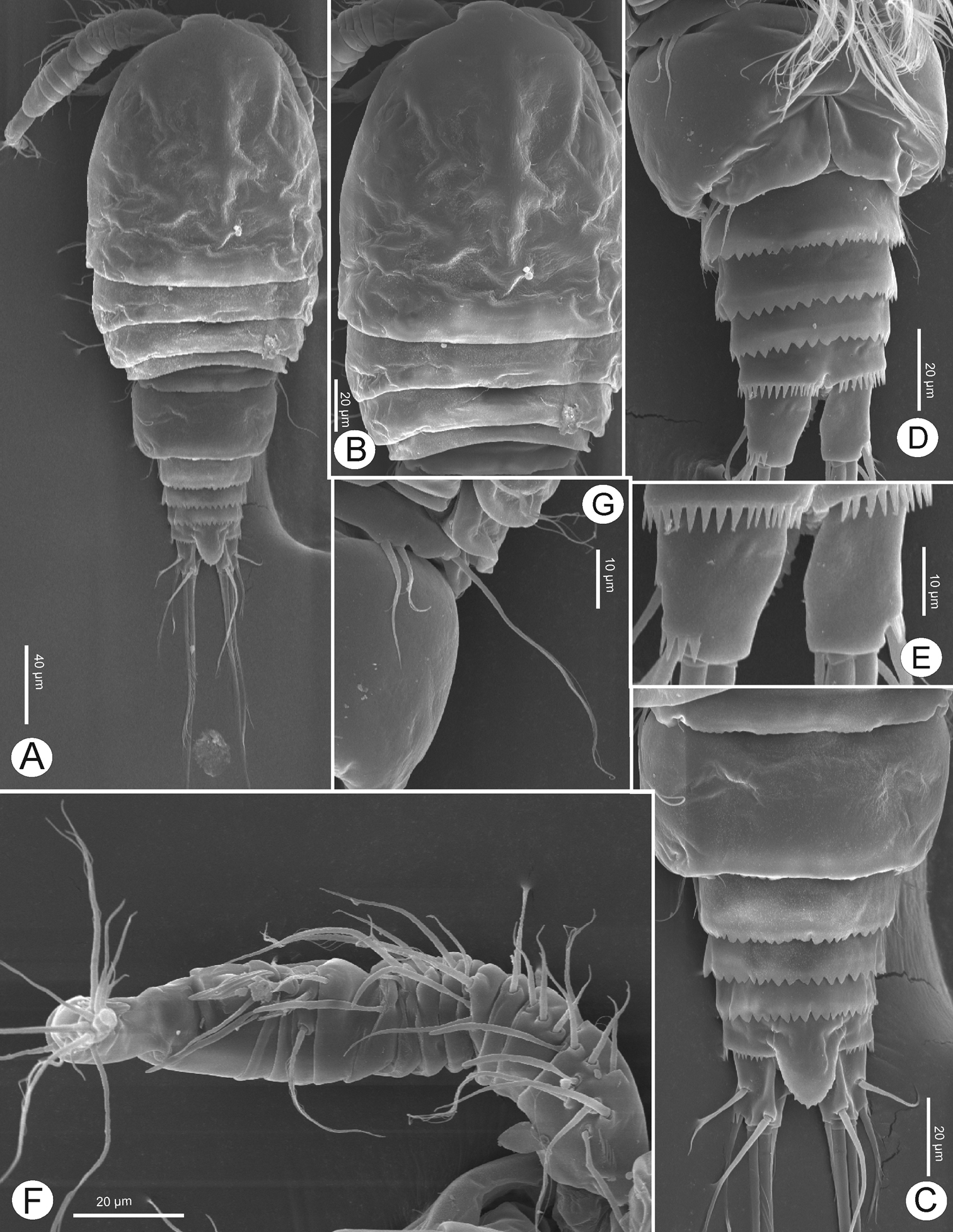
Bryocyclops asetus male

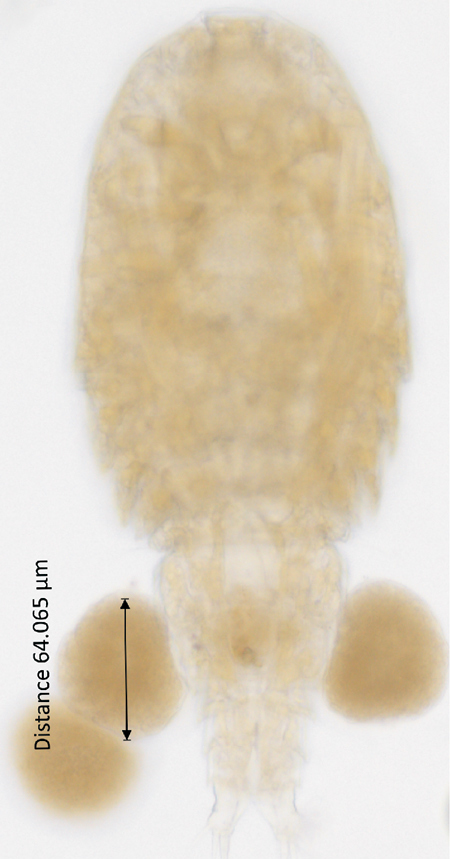
Bryocyclops asetus female with egg clutches

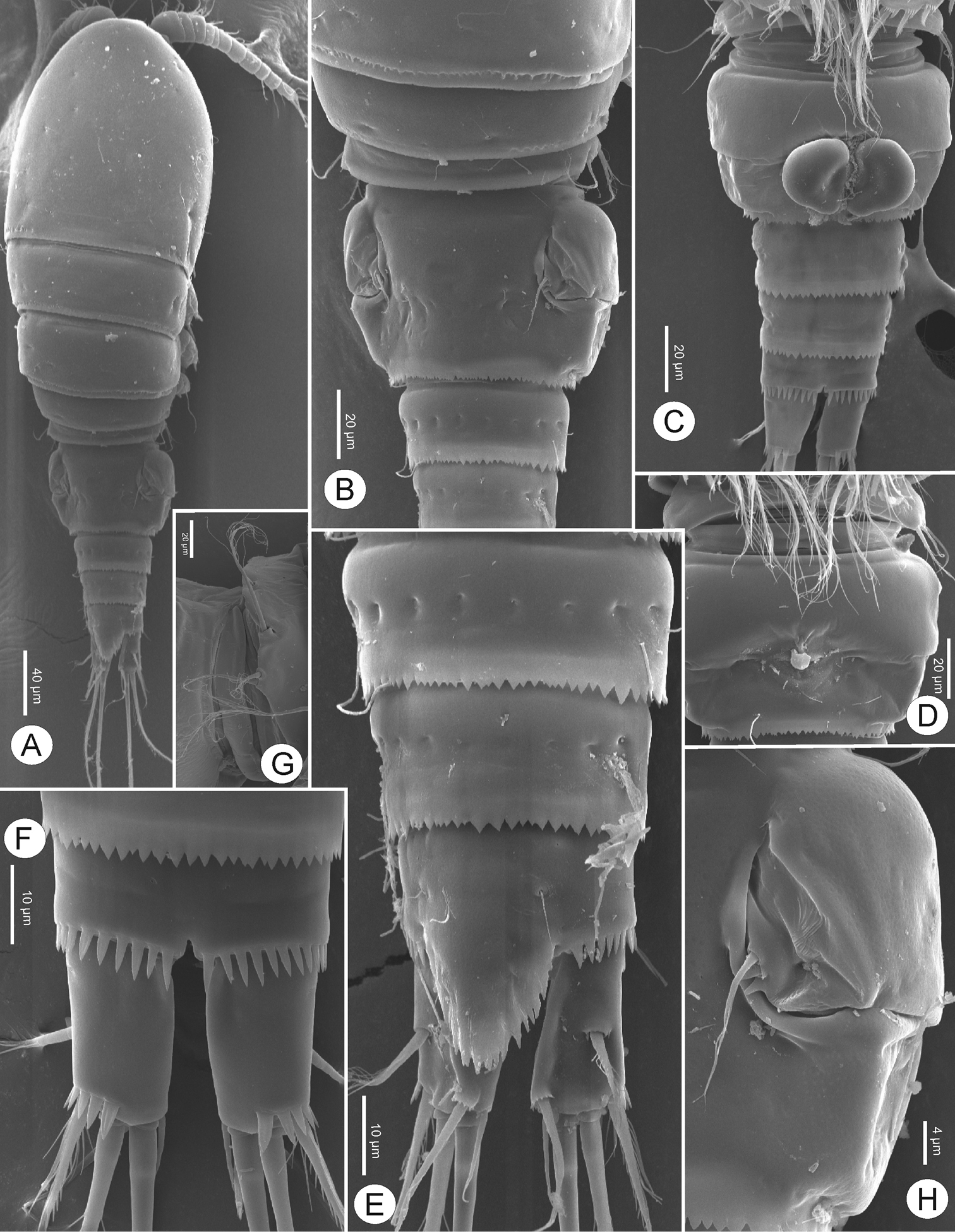
Bryocyclops muscicola female

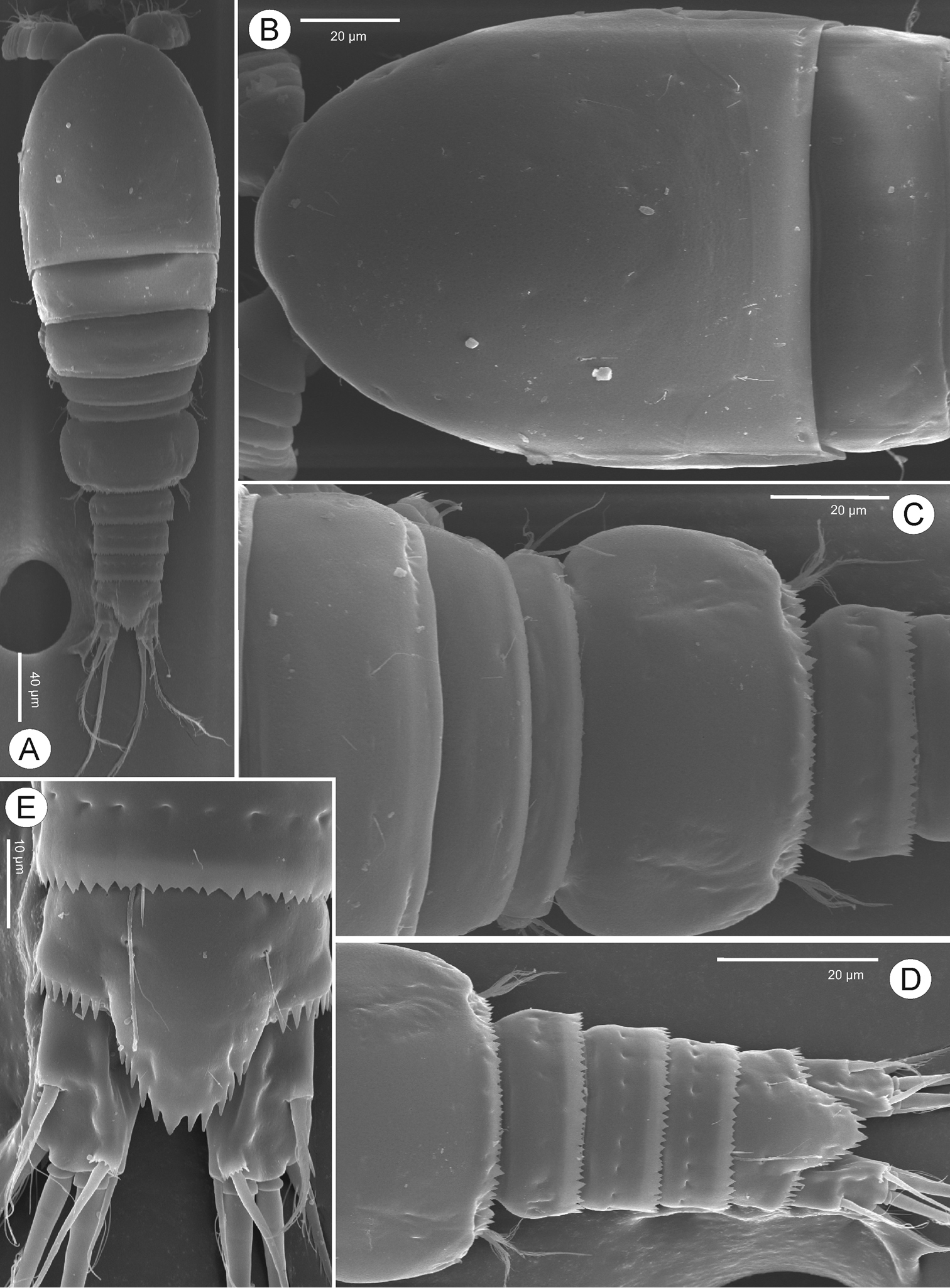
Bryocyclops muscicola male

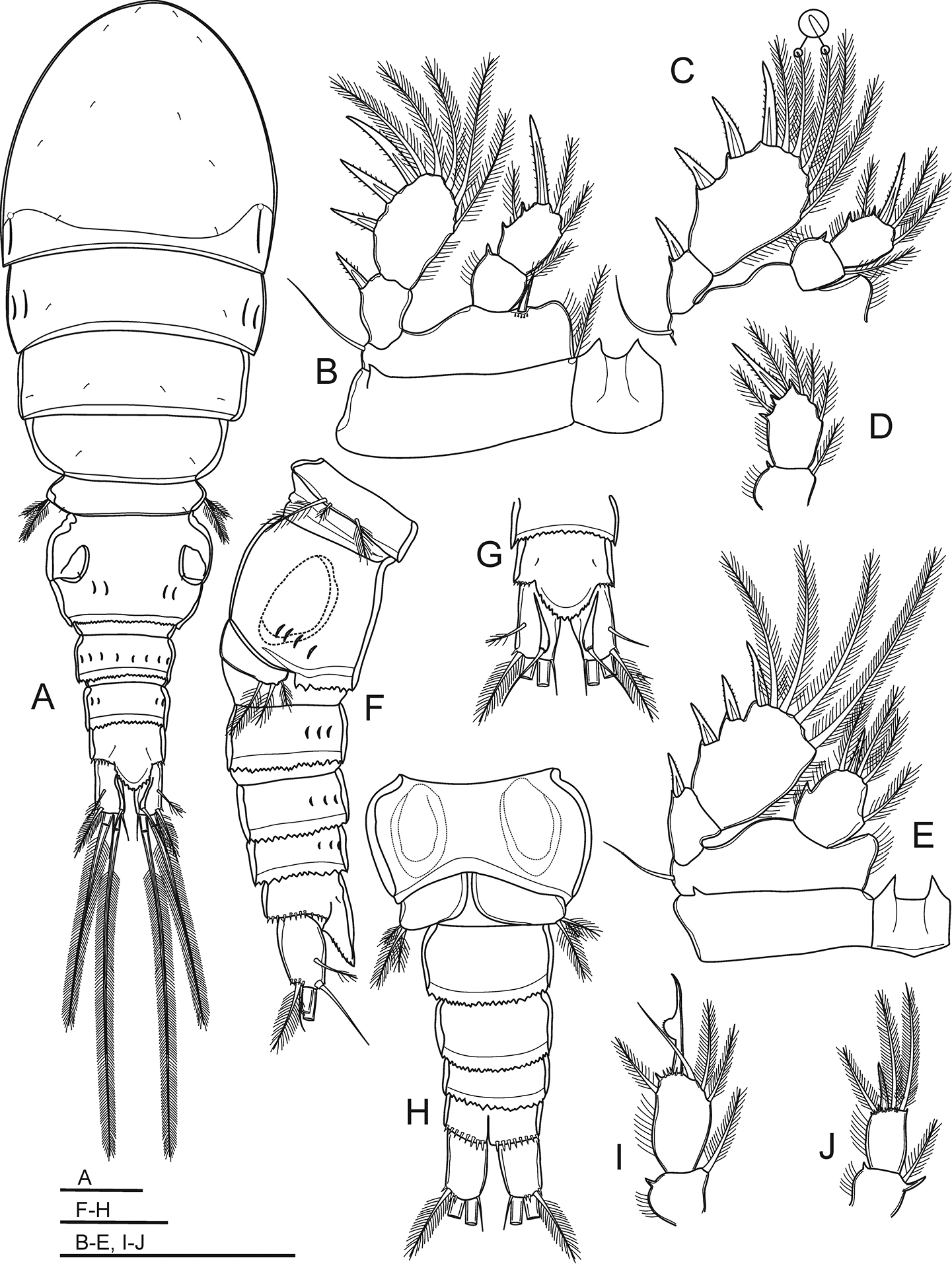
Bryocyclops muscicola female
