= Dussartcyclops =

Scientific classification
- Kingdom: Animalia
- Phylum: Arthropoda
- Clade: Pancrustacea
- Class: Copepoda
- Order: Cyclopoida
- Family: Cyclopidae
- Subfamily: Cyclopinae
- Genus: Dussartcyclops; Karanovic, Eberhard & Murdoch, 2011

Type species
- Dussartcyclops uniarticulatus (Karanovic, 2004)

Genus of crustaceans

Dussartcyclops is a genus of copepods in the family, Cyclopidae, and was first described in 2011 by Tomislav Karanovic, Stefan M. Eberhard, and A. Murdoch. The type species is Dussartcyclops uniarticulatus.

It is a freshwater copepod genus.

== Species & subgenera ==
Species and subgenera (according to WoRMS) are:

- Subgenus Dussartcyclops (Barrowcyclops) Karanovic, Eberhard & Murdoch, 2011
  - Species Dussartcyclops (Barrowcyclops) consensus (Karanovic, 2003)
- Subgenus Dussartcyclops (Dussartcyclops) Karanovic, Eberhard & Murdoch, 2011
  - Species Dussartcyclops (Dussartcyclops) mortoni (Karanovic, 2004)
  - Species Dussartcyclops (Dussartcyclops) uniarticulatus (Karanovic, 2004)
