= Phytotelma =

Small water-filled cavity in a terrestrial plant

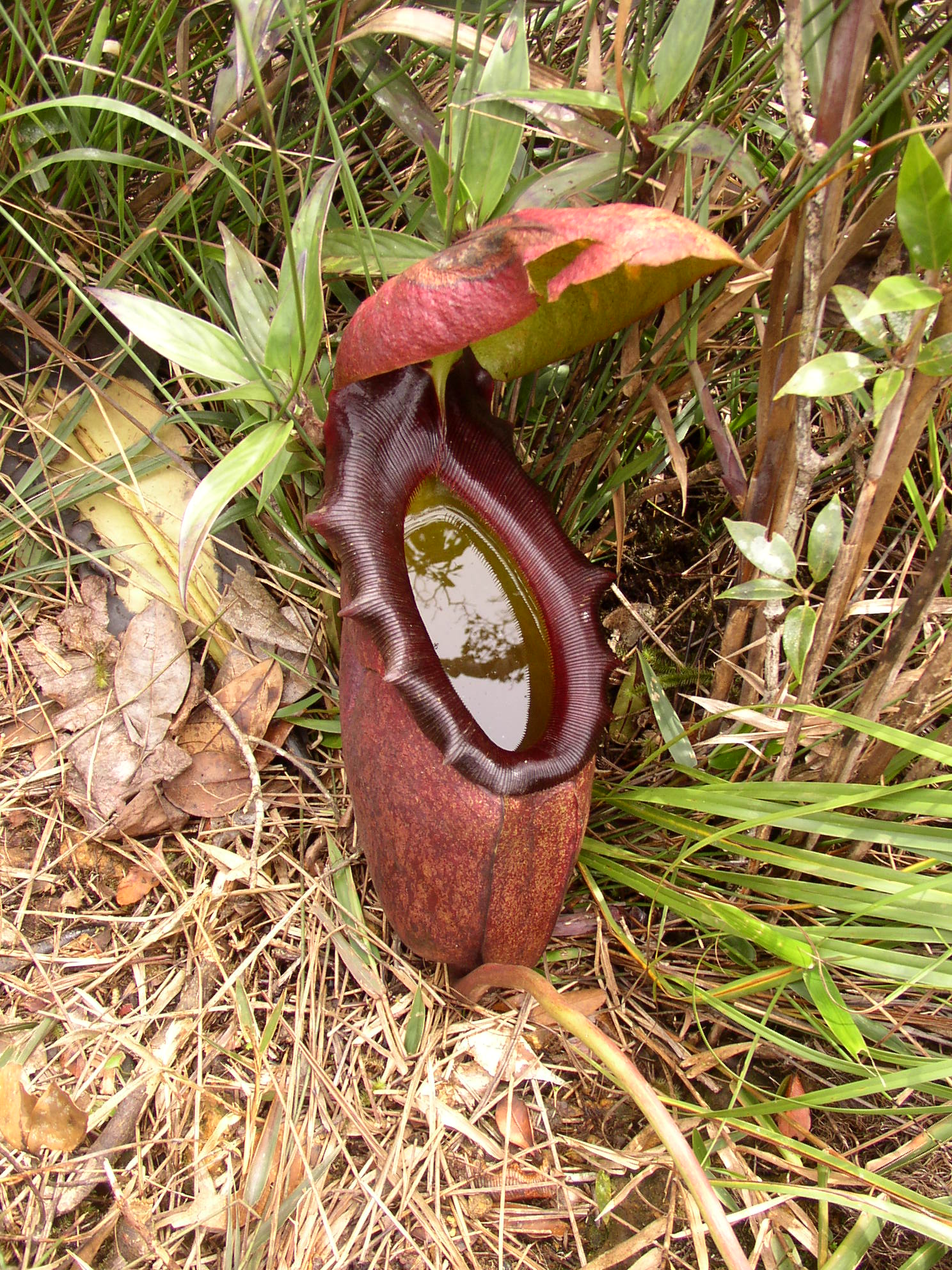
The giant pitchers of Nepenthes rajah act as phytotelmata

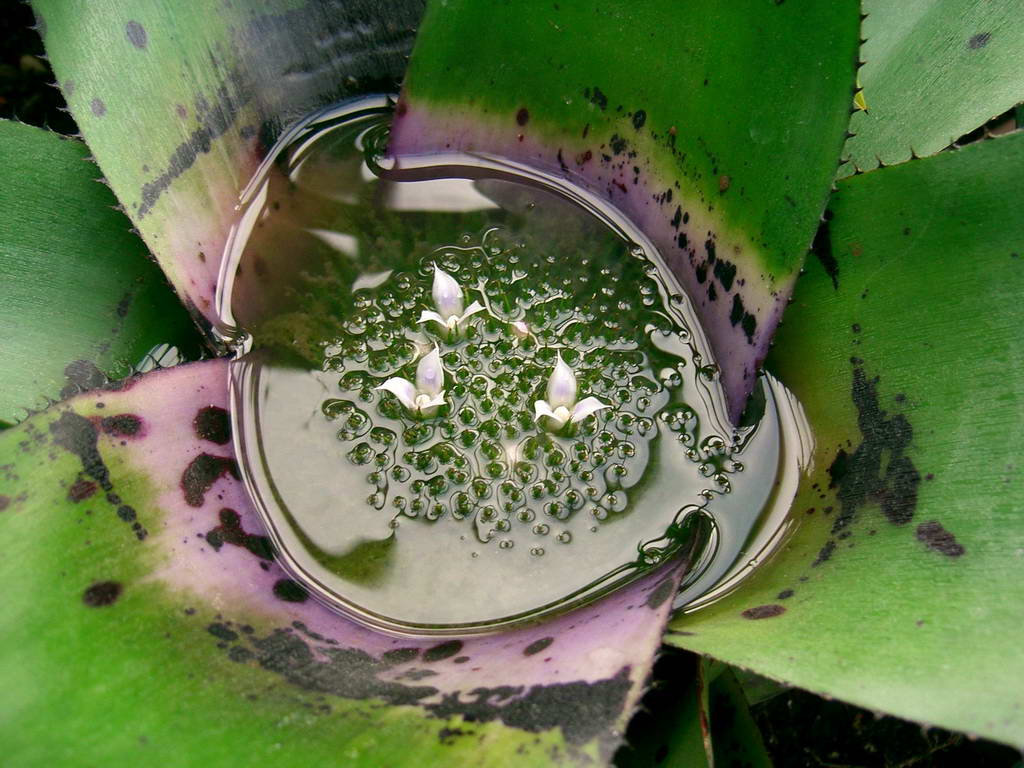
Bromeliad tank formed by Neoregelia concentrica var. plutonis

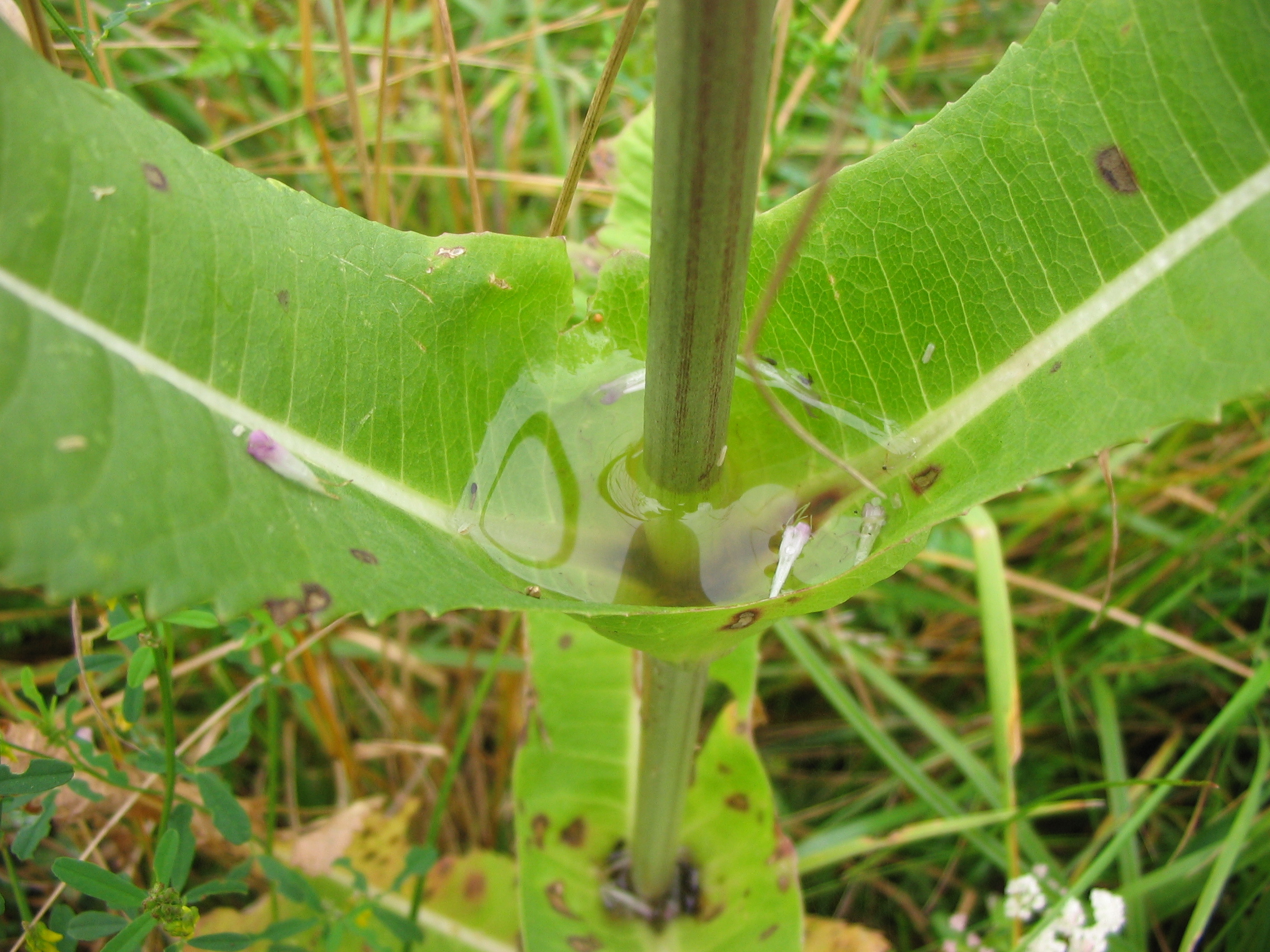
Phytotelma of connate-perfoliate leaves of the wild teasel

Dendrotelma of Sycamore specimen with co-dominant stems/twin trunks, created by early activation of paired buds caused by damage to leader, suppressing apical dominance

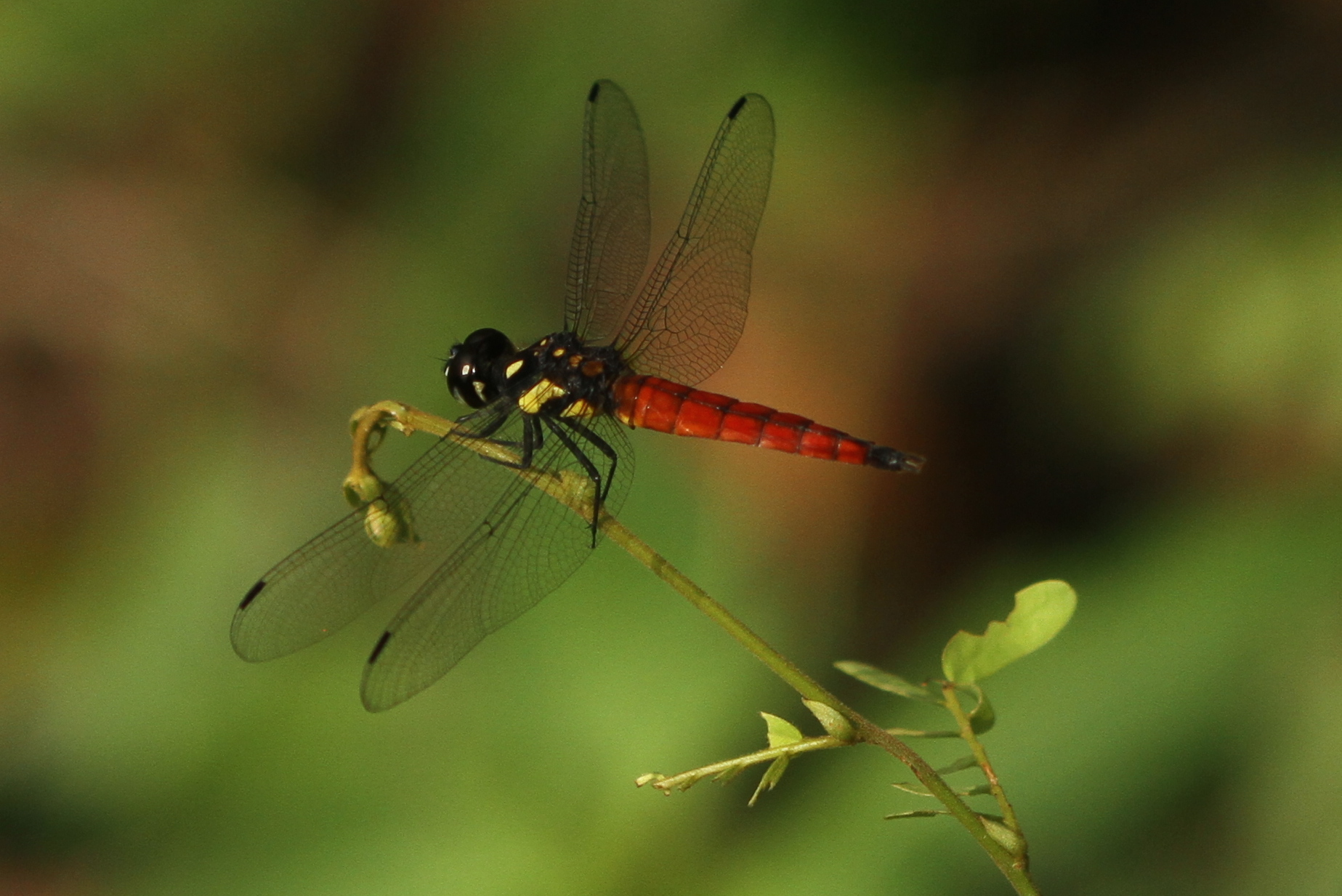
Lyriothemis tricolor is a species of dragonfly that breeds in phytotelmata

A phytotelma (plural phytotelmata) is a small water-filled cavity in a terrestrial plant. The water accumulated within these plants may serve as the habitat for associated fauna and flora.

A rich literature in German summarised by Thienemann (1954) developed many aspects of phytotelm biology. Reviews of the subject by Kitching (1971) and Maguire (1971) introduced the concept of phytotelmata to English-speaking readers. A multi-authored book edited by Frank and Lounibos (1983) dealt in 11 chapters with classification of phytotelmata, and with phytotelmata provided by bamboo internodes, banana leaf axils, bromeliad leaf axils, Nepenthes pitchers, Sarracenia pitchers, tree holes, and Heliconia flower bracts and leaf rolls.

A classification of phytotelmata by Kitching (2000) recognizes five principal types: bromeliad tanks, certain carnivorous plants such as pitcher plants, water-filled tree hollows (dendrotelmata), bamboo internodes, and axil water (collected at the base of leaves, petals or bracts); it concentrated on food webs. A review by Greeney (2001) identified seven forms: tree holes, leaf axils, flowers, modified leaves, fallen vegetative parts (e.g. leaves or bracts), fallen fruit husks, and stem rots.

== Etymology ==
The word "phytotelma" derives from the ancient Greek roots phyto-, meaning 'plant', and telma, meaning 'pond'. Thus, the correct singular is phytotelma.

The term was coined by L. Varga in 1928.

The correct pronunciation is "phytotēlma" and "phytotēlmata" because of the Greek origin (the stressed vowels are here written as ē).

== Ecology ==
Often the faunae associated with phytotelmata are unique: Different groups of microcrustaceans occur in phytotelmata, including ostracods (Elpidium spp. Metacypris bromeliarum), harpacticoid copepods (Bryocamptus spp, Moraria arboricola, Attheyella spp.) and cyclopoid copepods (Bryocyclops spp.,Tropocyclops jamaicensis).

In tropical and subtropical rainforest habitats, many species of frogs specialize on phytotelma as a readily available breeding ground, such as some microhylids (in pitcher plants), poison dart frogs and some tree frogs (in bromeliads).

Many insects use them for breeding and foraging, for instance odonates, water bugs, beetles and dipterans. Some species also are of great practical significance; for example, immature stages of some mosquitoes, such as some Anopheles and Aedes species that are important disease vectors, develop in phytotelmata.

As these are such small systems, there may be great risk of nitrogenous waste eventually putrefying phytotelmata, killing their inhabitants. Potentially relevant is that tadpoles of the species Kurixalus eiffingeri have been found to avoid defecation until after metamorphosis, when they have vacated phytotelmata. This may evidence selection for social sanitation, and the discoverers surmise this may be a selective pressure for other denizens of phytotelmata as well.

== See also ==
- Nepenthes infauna
- Bromeliaceae
