= Tropocyclops =

Scientific classification
- Kingdom: Animalia
- Phylum: Arthropoda
- Clade: Pancrustacea
- Class: Copepoda
- Order: Cyclopoida
- Family: Cyclopidae
- Genus: Tropocyclops; Kiefer, 1927

Genus of crustaceans

Tropocyclops is a genus of copepod crustaceans in the family Cyclopidae. It contains the following species:

- Tropocyclops affinis (G. O. Sars, 1863)
- Tropocyclops bopingi Dumont, 2006
- Tropocyclops breviramus Hsiao, 1950
- Tropocyclops brevis Dussart, 1972
- Tropocyclops brevispinus Shen & Tai, 1962
- Tropocyclops candidiusi (Harada, 1931)
- Tropocyclops chinei Dang, 1967
- Tropocyclops confinis (Kiefer, 1930)
- Tropocyclops extensus Kiefer, 1931
- Tropocyclops federensis Reid, 1991
- Tropocyclops frequens Kiefer, 1931
- Tropocyclops ishidai Lee & Chang, 2007
- Tropocyclops jamaicensis Reid & Janetzky, 1996
- Tropocyclops jerseyensis Kiefer, 1931
- Tropocyclops levequi Dumont, 1981
- Tropocyclops longiabdominalis Shen & Tai, 1962
- Tropocyclops matanoensis Defaye, 2007
- Tropocyclops mellanbyi Onabamiro, 1952
- Tropocyclops miser (Brehm, 1953)
- Tropocyclops nananae Reid, 1991
- Tropocyclops nigroviridis Harada, 1931
- Tropocyclops onabamiroi Lindberg, 1950
- Tropocyclops parvus Kiefer, 1931
- Tropocyclops piscinalis Dussart, 1984
- Tropocyclops polkianus Einsle, 1971
- Tropocyclops prasinus (Fischer, 1860)
- Tropocyclops pseudoparvus Dussart & Fernando, 1986
- Tropocyclops rarus Dussart, 1983
- Tropocyclops schubarti Kiefer, 1935
- Tropocyclops setulifer Lee & Chang, 2007
- Tropocyclops tenellus (G. O. Sars, 1909)
- Tropocyclops varicoides (Brady, 1908)
