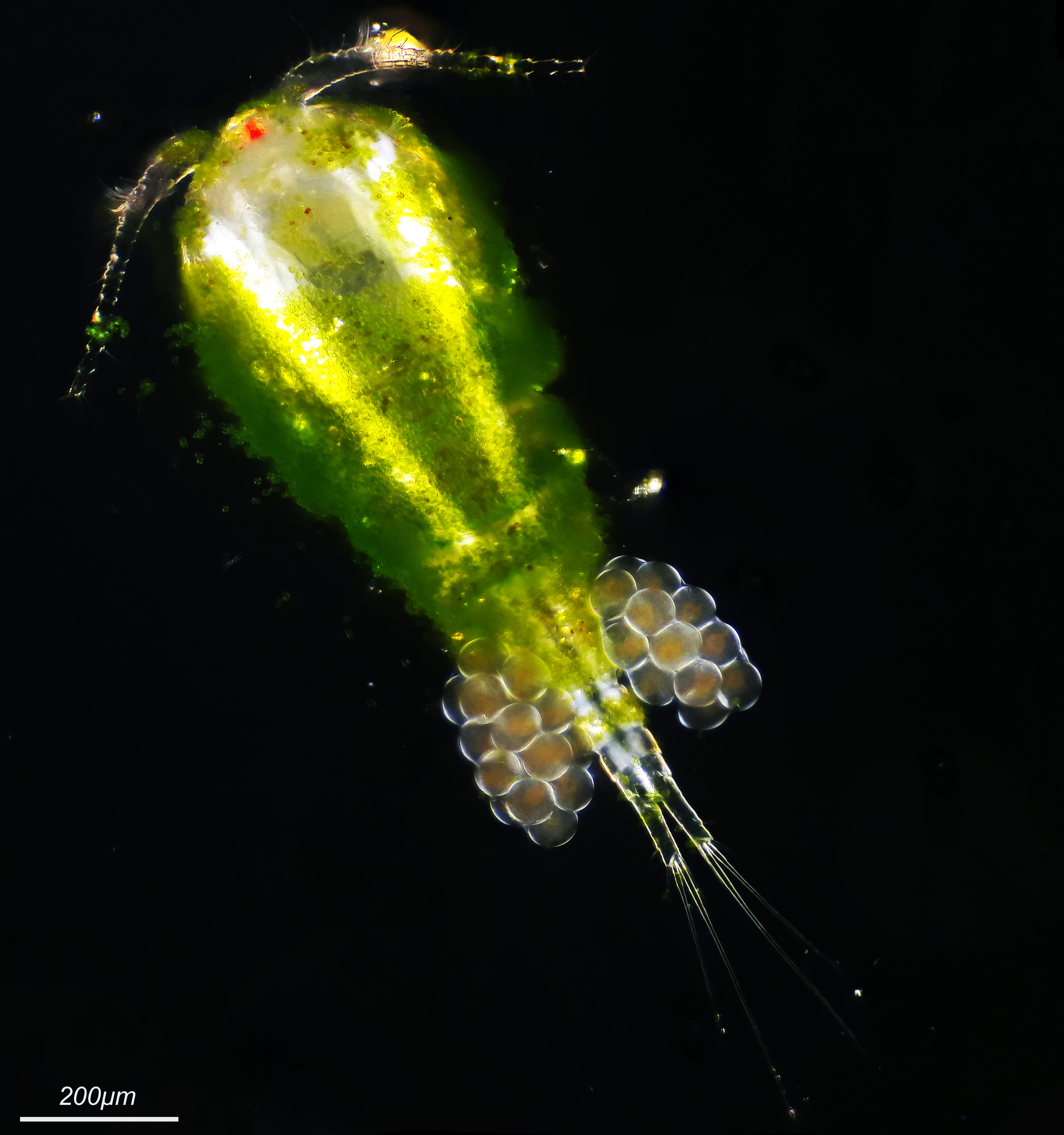

Scientific classification
- Kingdom: Animalia
- Phylum: Arthropoda
- Clade: Pancrustacea
- Class: Copepoda
- Order: Cyclopoida
- Family: Cyclopidae
- Genus: Acanthocyclops; Kiefer, 1927

= Acanthocyclops =

Genus of crustaceans

Acanthocyclops is a genus of copepod crustaceans in the family Cyclopidae. It was originally described by Friedrich Kiefer as a subgenus of Cyclops, and contains the following species:

- Acanthocyclops abyssicola (Lilljeborg, 1901)
- Acanthocyclops agamus Kiefer, 1938
- Acanthocyclops alticola (Kiefer, 1935)
- Acanthocyclops americanus (Marsh, 1893)
- Acanthocyclops arenosus Mazepova, 1950
- Acanthocyclops balcanicus Naidenov & Pandourski, 1992
- Acanthocyclops biarticulatus Monchenko, 1972
- Acanthocyclops bicuspidatus (Claus, 1857)
- Acanthocyclops bisetosus (Rehberg, 1880)
- Acanthocyclops brachypus (Kiefer, 1955)
- Acanthocyclops brevispinosus (Herrick, 1884)
- Acanthocyclops caesariatus Mercado-Salas & Suárez-Morales, 2009
- Acanthocyclops capillatus (Sars, 1863)
- Acanthocyclops carolinianus (Yeatman, 1944)
- Acanthocyclops cephallenus Pesce, 1978
- Acanthocyclops chappuisi (Naidenov & Pandourski, 1992)
- Acanthocyclops columbiensis Reid, 1990
- Acanthocyclops crassicaudis (Sars, 1863)
- Acanthocyclops crassicaudoides (Kiefer, 1928)
- Acanthocyclops crinitus (Graeter, 1910)
- Acanthocyclops deminutus (Sterba, 1954)
- Acanthocyclops denticornis Chislenko, 1977
- Acanthocyclops dussarti Pesce & Maggi, 1977
- Acanthocyclops einslei Mirabdullayev & Defaye, 2004
- Acanthocyclops ekmani Lindberg, 1950
- Acanthocyclops elegans Mazepova, 1962
- Acanthocyclops exilis (Coker, 1934)
- Acanthocyclops fonticulus Lee & Chang, 2007
- Acanthocyclops fontinalis Naidenov, 1969
- Acanthocyclops formosanus Harada, 1931
- Acanthocyclops galbinus Mazepova, 1962
- Acanthocyclops gigas (Claus, 1857)
- Acanthocyclops gmeineri Pospisil, 1989
- Acanthocyclops gordani Petkovski, 1971
- Acanthocyclops hispanicus Kiefer, 1937
- Acanthocyclops hypogeus (Kiefer, 1930)
- Acanthocyclops improcerus Mazepova, 1950
- Acanthocyclops incolotaenia Mazepova, 1950
- Acanthocyclops insectus (Forbes, 1882)
- Acanthocyclops intermedius Mazepova, 1952
- Acanthocyclops iskrecensis Pandourski, 1992
- Acanthocyclops jasnitskii Mazepova, 1950
- Acanthocyclops jeanneli (Chappuis, 1929)
- Acanthocyclops kagaensis ItoTak, 1964
- Acanthocyclops kieferi (Chappuis, 1925)
- Acanthocyclops konstantini Mazepova, 1962
- Acanthocyclops languidoides (Lilljeborg, 1901)
- Acanthocyclops languidus (Sars, 1863)
- Acanthocyclops latipes (Lowndes, 1927)
- Acanthocyclops lobulosus (Ekman, 1905)
- Acanthocyclops longifurcus Shen & Sung, 1963
- Acanthocyclops macedonicus (Petkovski, 1954)
- Acanthocyclops magnus (Marsh, 1920)
- Acanthocyclops marceloi Mercado-Salas & Suárez-Morales, 2009
- Acanthocyclops michaelseni (Mrázek, 1901)
- Acanthocyclops milotai Iepure & Defaye, 2008
- Acanthocyclops mirnyi Borutsky & Vinogradov, 1957
- Acanthocyclops miurai ItoTak, 1957
- Acanthocyclops montana Reid & Reed, 1991
- Acanthocyclops morimotoi ItoTak, 1952
- Acanthocyclops muscicola (Lastochkin, 1924)
- Acanthocyclops nanus (Sars, 1863)
- Acanthocyclops niceae Mann, 1940
- Acanthocyclops notabilis Mazepova, 1950
- Acanthocyclops orientalis Borutsky, 1966
- Acanthocyclops parasensitivus Reid, 1998
- Acanthocyclops parcus (Herrick, 1882)
- Acanthocyclops parvulus Strayer, 1989
- Acanthocyclops pennaki Reid, 1992
- Acanthocyclops petkovskii Pesce & Lattinger, 1983
- Acanthocyclops phreaticus (Chappuis, 1928)
- Acanthocyclops pilosus Kiefer, 1934
- Acanthocyclops plattensis Pennak & Ward, 1985
- Acanthocyclops plesai Iepure, 2001
- Acanthocyclops profundus Mazepova, 1950
- Acanthocyclops propinquus Plesa, 1957
- Acanthocyclops radevi Pandourski, 1993
- Acanthocyclops rebecae Fiers, Ghenne & Suárez-Morales, 2000
- Acanthocyclops reductus (Chappuis, 1925)
- Acanthocyclops rhenanus Kiefer, 1936
- Acanthocyclops robustus (Sars, 1863)
- Acanthocyclops rupestris Mazepova, 1950
- Acanthocyclops sambugarae Kiefer, 1981
- Acanthocyclops sensitivus (Graeter & Chappuis, 1914)
- Acanthocyclops serrani Braicovich & Timi, 2009
- Acanthocyclops signifer Mazepova, 1952
- Acanthocyclops similis Flössner, 1984
- Acanthocyclops skottsbergi Lindberg, 1949
- Acanthocyclops smithae Reid & Suárez-Morales, 1999
- Acanthocyclops spongicola Mazepova, 1962
- Acanthocyclops stammeri Kiefer, 1931
- Acanthocyclops strimonis (Pandourski, 1994)
- Acanthocyclops stygius (Chappuis, 1924)
- Acanthocyclops talievi Mazepova, 1970
- Acanthocyclops tenuispinalis Shen & Sung, 1963
- Acanthocyclops thomasi (Forbes, 1882)
- Acanthocyclops tokchokensis Kim & Chang, 1991
- Acanthocyclops trajani Mirabdullayev & Defaye, 2004
- Acanthocyclops troglophilus (Kiefer, 1932)
- Acanthocyclops venustoides (Coker, 1934)
- Acanthocyclops venustus (Norman & Scott, 1906)
- Acanthocyclops vernalis (Fischer, 1853)
- Acanthocyclops versutus Mazepova, 1961
- Acanthocyclops viridis (Jurine, 1820)
