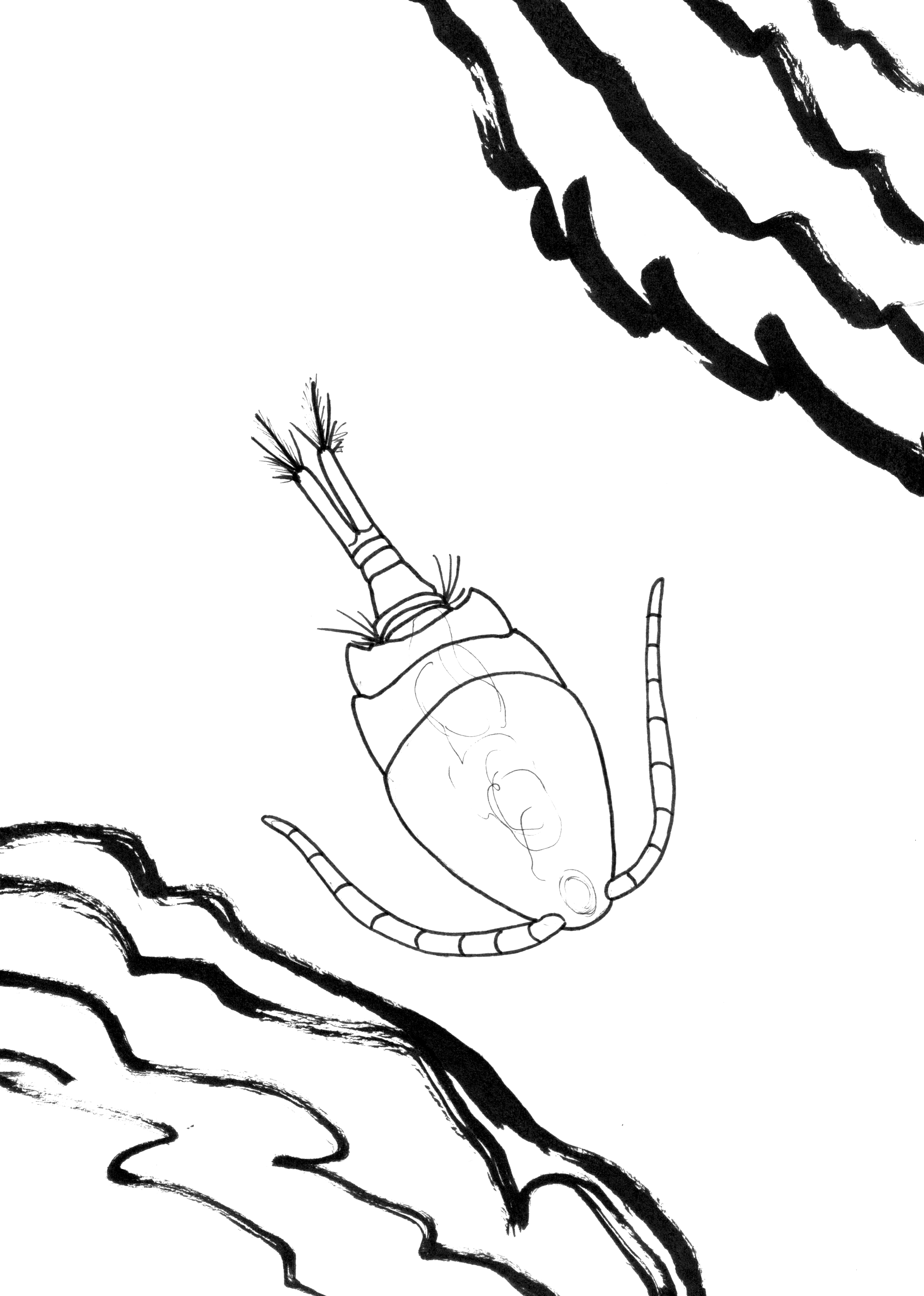
- Afrocyclops pauliani

Scientific classification
- Kingdom: Animalia
- Phylum: Arthropoda
- Clade: Pancrustacea
- Class: Copepoda
- Order: Cyclopoida
- Family: Cyclopidae
- Genus: Afrocyclops; G. O. Sars, 1927

= Afrocyclops =

Genus of crustaceans

Afrocyclops is a genus of copepod crustaceans in the family Cyclopidae, containing the following species:

- Afrocyclops alter Kiefer, 1935
- Afrocyclops curticornis (Kiefer, 1932)
- Afrocyclops doryphorus Kiefer, 1935
- Afrocyclops gibsoni (Brady, 1904)
- Afrocyclops herringi Alekseev & Sanoamuang, 2006
- Afrocyclops ikennus Onabamiro, 1957
- Afrocyclops lanceolatus Kiefer, 1935
- Afrocyclops nubicus (Chappuis, 1922)
- Afrocyclops pauliani Lindberg, 1951
- Afrocyclops propinquus (Kiefer, 1932)
- Afrocyclops sparus Dussart, 1974
