= Halicyclops =

Scientific classification
- Domain: Eukaryota
- Kingdom: Animalia
- Phylum: Arthropoda
- Class: Copepoda
- Order: Cyclopoida
- Family: Halicyclopidae
- Genus: Halicyclops; Norman, 1903

Species
- See text

Synonyms
- Hemicyclops Claus, 1893; Herouardia Labbé, 1927; Platycheiron Scott T., 1892; Tococheres Pelseneer, 1929

Genus of crustaceans

Halicyclops is a genus of copepods belonging to the family Cyclopidae. There are currently 94 described species found in brackish habitats throughout the world:

- Halicyclops aberrans C. E. F. Rocha, 1983
- Halicyclops aequoreus (Fischer, 1860)
- Halicyclops ambiguus Kiefer, 1967
- Halicyclops antiguaensis Herbst, 1983
- Halicyclops aquaesurgentis Bozic, 1964
- Halicyclops ariakensis Ueda & Nagai, 2009
- Halicyclops blachei Lindberg, 1952
- Halicyclops bowmani C. E. F. Rocha & Iliffe, 1993
- Halicyclops brevispinosus Herbst, 1952
- Halicyclops calm Karanovic, 2006
- Halicyclops caneki Fiers, 1995
- Halicyclops canuensis (Bourne, 1890)
- Halicyclops canui Lindberg, 1941
- Halicyclops caridophilus Humes, 1947
- Halicyclops cenoticola C. E. F. Rocha, Iliffe, Reid & Suárez-Morales, 1998
- Halicyclops clarkei Herbst, 1982
- Halicyclops continentalis Ueda & Nagai, 2009
- Halicyclops coulli Herbst, 1977
- Halicyclops crassicornis Herbst, 1955
- Halicyclops cryptus Monchenko, 1979
- Halicyclops dalmatinus Petkovski, 1955
- Halicyclops dedeckeri Brownell, 1983
- Halicyclops denticulatus Kiefer, 1960
- Halicyclops dussarti C. E. F. Rocha, 1995
- Halicyclops eberhardi De Laurentiis, Pesce & Humphreys, 2001
- Halicyclops electus Lindberg, 1943
- Halicyclops exiguus Kiefer, 1934
- Halicyclops fosteri M. S. Wilson, 1958
- Halicyclops gauldi Plesa, 1961
- Halicyclops gaviriai Suárez-Morales & Fuentes-Reinés, 2014
- Halicyclops glaber C. E. F. Rocha, 1983
- Halicyclops harpacticoides (Shmankevich, 1875)
- Halicyclops herbsti C. E. F. Rocha & Iliffe, 1993
- Halicyclops higoensis Itô, 1957
- Halicyclops hurlberti C. E. F. Rocha, 1991
- Halicyclops incognitus Herbst, 1962
- Halicyclops itohi Ueda & Nagai, 2012
- Halicyclops japonicus Itô, 1956
- Halicyclops kieferi Karanovic, 2004
- Halicyclops konkanensis Lindberg, 1949
- Halicyclops korodiensis Onabamiro, 1952
- Halicyclops laciniatus Herbst, 1987
- Halicyclops laminifer Herbst, 1982
- Halicyclops lanceolatus Chang & Lee, 2012
- Halicyclops latus Shen & Tai, 1964
- Halicyclops lindbergi C. E. F. Rocha, 1995
- Halicyclops longifurcatus Pesce, De Laurentiis & Humphreys, 1996
- Halicyclops lutum Karanovic, 2008
- Halicyclops maculatus C. E. F. Rocha & Hakenkamp, 1993
- Halicyclops magniceps (Lilljeborg, 1853)
- Halicyclops martinezi Totakura & Reddy, 2015
- Halicyclops neglectus Kiefer, 1935
- Halicyclops oblongus Lindberg, 1951
- Halicyclops oraeeburnensis Lindberg, 1957
- Halicyclops oryzanus Defaye & Dussart, 1988
- Halicyclops ovatus C. E. F. Rocha, 1984
- Halicyclops paradenticulatus C. E. F. Rocha, 1984
- Halicyclops pescei Karanovic, 2004
- Halicyclops pilifer Lindberg, 1949
- Halicyclops pilosus C. E. F. Rocha, 1984
- Halicyclops pondoensis Wooldridge, 1977
- Halicyclops propinquus G. O. Sars, 1905
- Halicyclops pumilus Chang & Lee, 2012
- Halicyclops pusillus Kiefer, 1954
- Halicyclops ramirezi Menu-Marque & Sorarrain, 2007
- Halicyclops reidae C. E. F. Rocha & Hakenkamp, 1993
- Halicyclops reunionensis Bozic, 1964
- Halicyclops reunionis Kiefer, 1960
- Halicyclops robustus Lindberg, 1951
- Halicyclops rochai De Laurentiis, Pesce & Humphreys, 1999
- Halicyclops rotundipes Kiefer, 1935
- Halicyclops ryukyuensis Itô, 1962
- Halicyclops sarsi Akatova, 1935
- Halicyclops septentrionalis Kiefer, 1935
- Halicyclops setifer Lindberg, 1950
- Halicyclops setiformis Ueda & Nagai, 2012
- Halicyclops similis Kiefer, 1935
- Halicyclops sinensis Kiefer, 1928
- Halicyclops soqotranus Baribwegure & Dumont, 2000
- Halicyclops souzacruzae C. E. F. Rocha, 1981
- Halicyclops spinifer Kiefer, 1935
- Halicyclops stocki Herbst, 1962
- Halicyclops tageae Lotufo & C. E. F. Rocha, 1993
- Halicyclops tenuispina Sewell, 1924
- Halicyclops tetracanthus C. E. F. Rocha, 1995
- Halicyclops thermophilus Kiefer, 1929
- Halicyclops thysanotus C. B. Wilson, 1935
- Halicyclops troglodytes Kiefer, 1954
- Halicyclops uncus Ueda & Nagai, 2009
- Halicyclops validus Monchenko, 1974
- Halicyclops venezuelaensis Lindberg, 1954
- Halicyclops verae C. E. F. Rocha, 1984
- Halicyclops wilsoni Mahoon & Zia, 1985
- Halicyclops ytororoma Lotufo & C. E. F. Rocha, 1993
