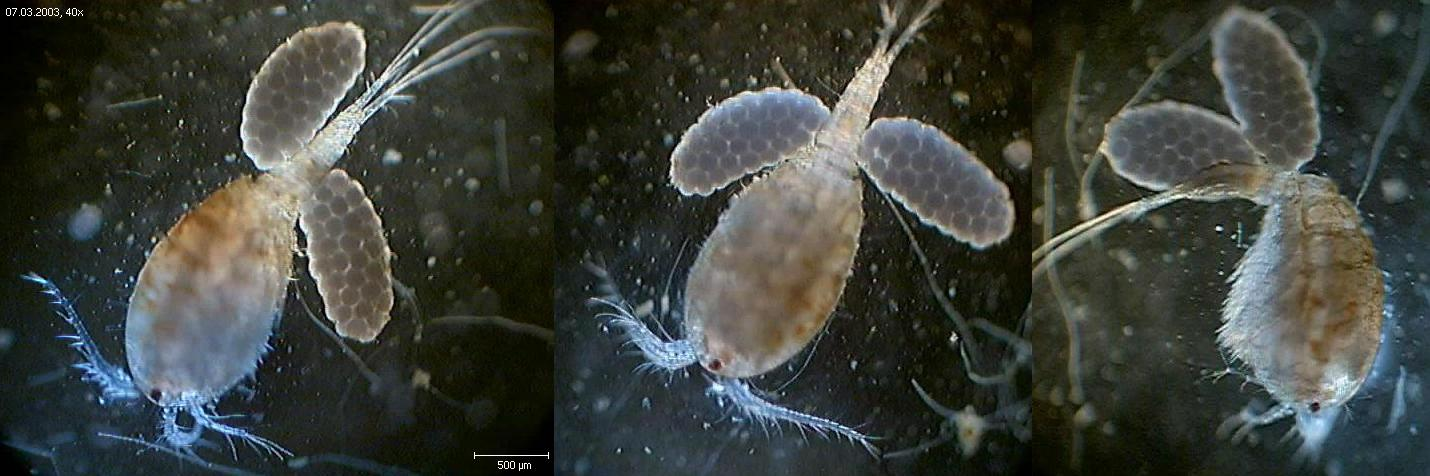
- Macrocyclops albidus

Scientific classification
- Domain: Eukaryota
- Kingdom: Animalia
- Phylum: Arthropoda
- Class: Copepoda
- Order: Cyclopoida
- Family: Cyclopidae
- Genus: Macrocyclops; Claus, 1893

Synonyms
- Pachycyclops Sars G.O., 1914

= Macrocyclops =

Genus of crustaceans

Macrocyclops is a genus of copepods belonging to the family Cyclopidae. There are currently 13 described species found in fresh water habitats throughout the world:

- Macrocyclops albicans G.W. Smith, 1909
- Macrocyclops albidus (Jurine, 1820)
- Macrocyclops annulicornis (Koch, 1838)
- Macrocyclops baicalensis Mazepova, 1962
- Macrocyclops bistriatus (Koch, 1838)
- Macrocyclops coronatus (Claus, 1857)
- Macrocyclops distinctus (Richard, 1887)
- Macrocyclops fuscus (Jurine, 1820)
- Macrocyclops monticola Ishida, 1994
- Macrocyclops neuter Kiefer, 1931
- Macrocyclops oithonoides Roen, 1957
- Macrocyclops oligolasius Kiefer, 1938
- Macrocyclops signatus (Koch, 1838)
