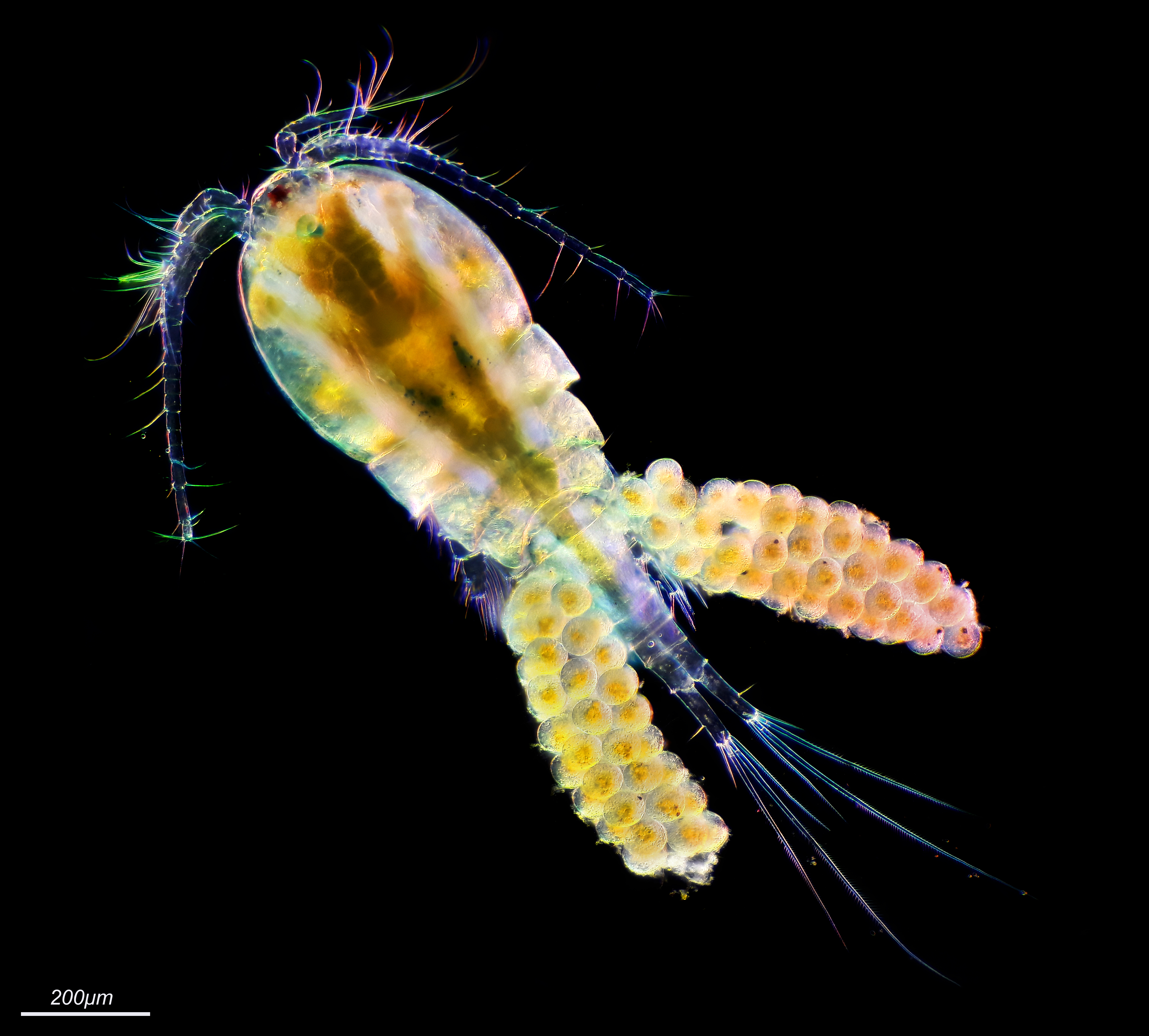

Scientific classification
- Kingdom: Animalia
- Phylum: Arthropoda
- Clade: Pancrustacea
- Class: Copepoda
- Order: Cyclopoida
- Family: Cyclopidae
- Genus: Megacyclops; Kiefer, 1927

= Megacyclops =

Genus of crustaceans

Megacyclops is a genus of copepods, containing the following species:

- Megacyclops brachypus Kiefer, 1955
- Megacyclops donnaldsoni (Chappuis, 1929)
- Megacyclops dussarti Pesce & Maggi, 1977
- Megacyclops formosanus (Harada, 1931)
- Megacyclops gigas (Claus, 1857)
- Megacyclops kieferi (Chappuis, 1925)
- Megacyclops languidoides (Lilljeborg, 1901)
- Megacyclops languidus (G. O. Sars, 1863)
- Megacyclops latipes (Lowndes, 1927)
- Megacyclops magnus (Marsh, 1920)
- Megacyclops minutus Claus, 1863
- Megacyclops viridis (Jurine, 1820)

- Megacyclops bicuspidatus (Claus, 1857) → Diacyclops bicuspidatus (Claus, 1857)
- Megacyclops bisetosus (Rehberg, 1880) → Diacyclops bisetosus (Rehberg, 1880)
- Megacyclops clandestinus (Kiefer, 1926) → Diacyclops clandestinus (Kiefer, 1926)
- Megacyclops niceae (Mann, 1940) → Megacyclops viridis (Jurine, 1820)
- Megacyclops robustus (G. O. Sars, 1863) → Acanthocyclops robustus (G. O. Sars, 1863)
