= Metacyclops postojnae =

Conservation status
- Vulnerable (IUCN 2.3)

Scientific classification
- Kingdom: Animalia
- Phylum: Arthropoda
- Class: Copepoda
- Order: Cyclopoida
- Family: Cyclopidae
- Genus: Metacyclops
- Species: M. postojnae

Binomial name
- Metacyclops postojnae Brancelj, 1987

Species of crustacean

Metacyclops postojnae is a species of copepod in the family Cyclopidae.

The IUCN conservation status of Metacyclops postojnae is "VU", vulnerable. The species faces a high risk of endangerment in the medium term. The IUCN status was reviewed in 1996.
