= Acanthocyclops hypogeus =

Conservation status
- Vulnerable (IUCN 2.3)

Scientific classification
- Kingdom: Animalia
- Phylum: Arthropoda
- Class: Copepoda
- Order: Cyclopoida
- Family: Cyclopidae
- Genus: Acanthocyclops
- Species: A. hypogeus

Binomial name
- Acanthocyclops hypogeus (Kiefer, 1930)

Synonyms
- Diacyclops hypogeus Kiefer, 1930

Species of crustacean

Acanthocyclops hypogeus is a species of copepod in the family Cyclopidae. It is endemic to Slovenia.
