= Muhaksan =

Mountain in South Korea

Coordinates: 45.2°N 128.533°E

- Hangul: 무학산
- Hanja: 舞鶴山
- RR: Muhaksan
- MR: Muhaksan

Muhaksan is a mountain in southern South Korea, lying in Changwon with a peak reaching 761.4 m (2,498 ft) above sea level.

== See also ==
- List of mountains in Korea
