= Apocyclops panamensis =

Scientific classification
- Kingdom: Animalia
- Phylum: Arthropoda
- Clade: Pancrustacea
- Class: Copepoda
- Order: Cyclopoida
- Family: Cyclopidae
- Genus: Apocyclops
- Species: A. panamensis

Binomial name
- Apocyclops panamensis (Marsh, 1913)

Synonyms
- Cyclops panamensis Marsh, 1913

Species of copepod

Apocyclops panamensis is a species of cyclopoid copepod in the family Cyclopidae. Originally described from Panama by Marsh in 1913, the species occurs in brackish and marine coastal waters across the tropics and subtropics, and has become one of several Apocyclops species cultured for use as live feed in marine finfish aquaculture.

== Description ==
Apocyclops panamensis is a small cyclopoid copepod, with adult females typically reaching around 0.8 to 1.1 mm in total length and males somewhat smaller. Like other members of the genus, it has a tear-drop shaped prosome, a narrower urosome, and paired egg sacs carried by the female.

== Taxonomy ==
The species was first described by C. Dwight Marsh in 1913 as Cyclops panamensis from material collected in Panama, and was later transferred to the genus Apocyclops Lindberg, 1942. It is one of roughly a dozen recognized species in the genus.

== Distribution and habitat ==
The species is reported from coastal lagoons, estuaries, mangrove systems, and inland saline waters across the Americas, the Caribbean, and parts of the Indo-Pacific. It tolerates a wide range of salinities, from near-freshwater conditions to full-strength seawater, and is generally associated with warm waters.

== Ecology ==
A. panamensis feeds on phytoplankton, microzooplankton, and detritus, and itself serves as prey for larval and juvenile fishes and invertebrates in coastal habitats. Like other cyclopoid copepods, it has a life cycle that includes six naupliar and five copepodite stages before reaching the adult stage.

== Use in aquaculture ==
The species has been investigated as a live feed for the larval rearing of marine fish, where the small size of its nauplii makes it suitable for species whose larvae cannot consume larger prey such as Artemia. Studies have examined its fatty acid composition, reproductive output, and tolerance to varying temperatures and salinities under culture conditions.
