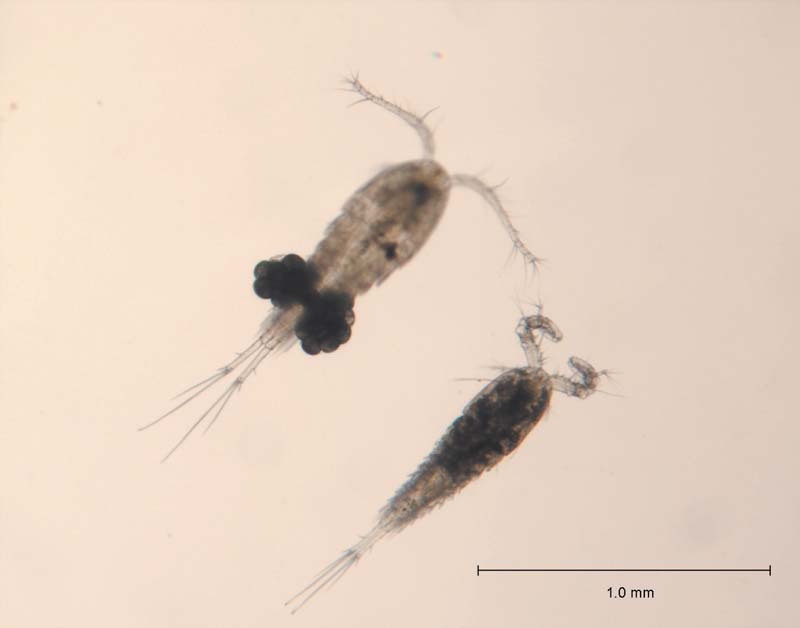
- Diacyclops bicuspidatus

Scientific classification
- Domain: Eukaryota
- Kingdom: Animalia
- Phylum: Arthropoda
- Class: Copepoda
- Order: Cyclopoida
- Family: Cyclopidae
- Genus: Diacyclops; Kiefer, 1927

Diversity
- At least 120 species

= Diacyclops =

Genus of arthropods

Diacyclops is a genus of cyclopoid copepods in the family Cyclopidae. There are more than 120 described species in Diacyclops.

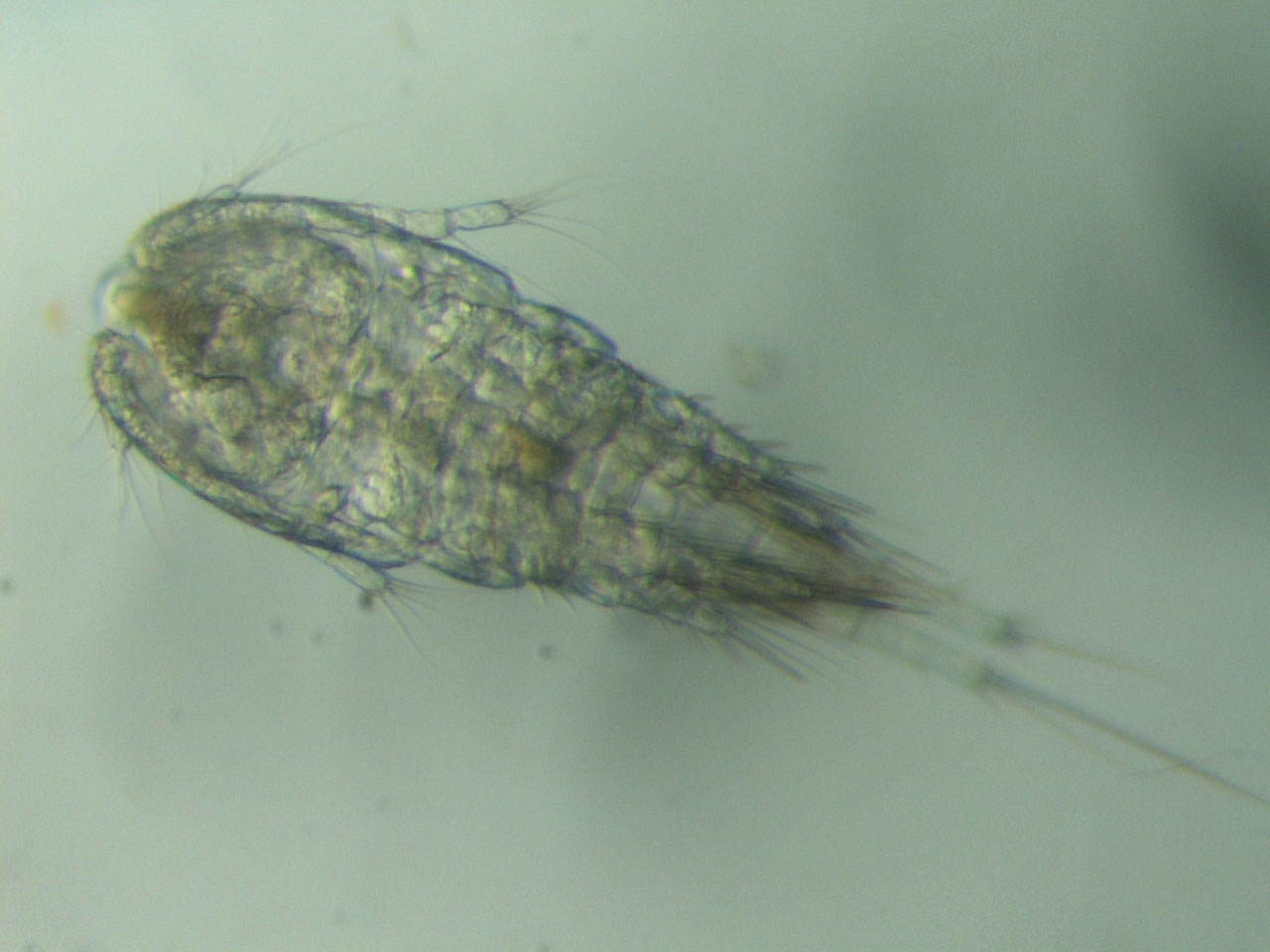
Diacyclops thomasi

== See also ==
- List of Diacyclops species
