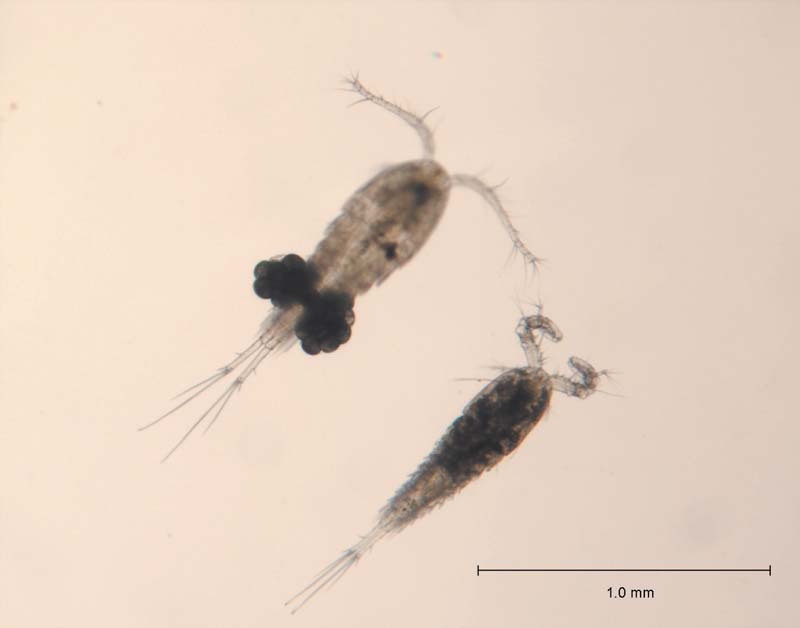
- Cyclops bicuspidatus male (below) and egg-bearing female. Scale bar is 1 millimetre.

Scientific classification
- Kingdom: Animalia
- Phylum: Arthropoda
- Clade: Pancrustacea
- Class: Copepoda
- Order: Cyclopoida
- Suborder: Cyclopida
- Family: Cyclopidae; Rafinesque, 1815

Synonyms
- Cyclopinae; Eucyclopinae

= Cyclopidae =

Family of crustaceans

Cyclopidae is a family of copepods containing more than half of the 1,200 species in the order Cyclopoida in over 70 genera.

== Genera ==
These genera are accepted as valid:

- Abdiacyclops Karanovic, 2005
- Acanthocyclops Kiefer, 1927
- Afrocyclops G. O. Sars, 1927
- Allocyclops Kiefer, 1932
- Ancheuryte Herbst, 1989
- Anzcyclops Karanovic, Eberhard & Murdoch, 2011
- Apocyclops Lindberg, 1942
- Australocyclops Morton, 1985
- Australoeucyclops Karanovic
- Austriocyclops Kiefer, 1964
- Bacillocyclops Lindberg, 1956
- Bryocyclops Kiefer, 1927
- Caspicyclops Monchenko, 1986
- Cochlacocyclops Kiefer, 1955
- Colpocyclops Monchenko, 1977
- Cyclops Müller, 1785
- Diacyclops Kiefer, 1927
- Dussartcyclops Karanovic, Eberhard & Murdoch, 2011
- Ectocyclops Brady, 1904
- Eucyclops Claus, 1893
- Euryte Philippi, 1843
- Faurea Labbé, 1927
- Fierscyclops Karanovic, 2004
- Fimbricyclops Reid, 1993
- Goniocyclops Kiefer, 1955
- Graeteriella Brehm, 1926
- Halicyclops Norman, 1903
- Haplocyclops Kiefer, 1952
- Hesperocyclops Herbst, 1984
- Heterocyclops Claus, 1893
- Idiocyclops Herbst, 1987
- Itocyclops Reid & Ishida, 2000
- Kieferiella Lescher-Moutoue, 1976
- Macrocyclops Claus, 1893
- Megacyclops Kiefer, 1927
- Menzeliella Lindberg, 1954
- Meridiecyclops Fiers, 2001
- Mesocyclops G. O. Sars, 1914
- Metacyclops Kiefer, 1927
- Microcyclops Claus, 1893
- Mixocyclops Kiefer, 1944
- Muscocyclops Kiefer, 1937
- Neocyclops Gurney, 1927
- Neutrocyclops Kiefer, 1936
- Ochridacyclops Kiefer, 1937
- Orbuscyclops Karanovic, 2006
- Orthocyclops Forbes, 1897
- Palaeocyclops Monchenko, 1972
- Paracyclops Claus, 1893
- Paragraeteriella Rylov, 1948
- Pareuryte Herbst, 1952
- Pescecyclops Karanovic, Eberhard & Murdoch, 2011
- Pilbaracyclops Karanovic, Eberhard & Murdoch, 2011
- Ponticyclops Reid, 1987
- Prehendocyclops C. E. F. Rocha, Iliffe, Reid & Suarez-Morales, 2000
- Protocyclops Lindberg, 1952
- Psammocyclops Kiefer, 1955
- Psammophilocyclops Fryer, 1956
- Reidcyclops Karanovich, 2000
- Rheocyclops Reid, Strayer, McArthur, Stibbe & J. Lewis, 1999
- Rybocyclops Reddy & DeFaye, 2008
- Smirnoviella Monchenko, 1977
- Speocyclops Kiefer, 1937
- Stolonicyclops Reid, 1998
- Teratocyclops Plesa, 1981
- Thaumasiocyclops Kiefer, 1933
- Thermocyclops Kiefer, 1927
- Troglocyclops C. E. F. Rocha & Iliffe, 1994
- Tropocyclops Kiefer, 1927
- Yansacyclops Reid, 1988
- Zealandcyclops Karanovic, 2005
