= Enteromyxum scophthalmi =

Scientific classification
- Kingdom: Animalia
- Phylum: Cnidaria
- Class: Myxozoa
- Order: Bivalvulida
- Family: Myxidiidae
- Genus: Enteromyxum
- Species: E. scophthalmi

Binomial name
- Enteromyxum scophthalmi Palenzuela, Redondo & Alvarez-Pellitero, 2002

Species of cnidarian

Enteromyxum scophthalmi is a species of parasitic myxozoan, a pathogen of fish. It is an intestinal parasite of the turbot (Scophthalmus maximus) and can cause outbreaks of disease in farmed fish. It causes a cachectic syndrome characterised by loss of weight, muscle atrophy, weakness and fatigue.

== Taxonomy ==
This parasite was first described in 2002 by Palenzuela, Redondo & Alvarez-Pellitero using material obtained from the gut of a turbot (Scophthalmus maximus). The fish were obtained from a farm in northwestern Spain. After examination with light and electron microscopy, and by comparing its ribosomal DNA with that of similar myxozoan species, it was established that this species was closely related to Myxidium leei, another enteric parasite of marine fish, but not to other members of the genus Myxidium. A combination of morphological data and data from molecular analysis resulted in the new genus Enteromyxum being created to include both the new species, E. scophthalmi, and the former species M. leei, which thus became Enteromyxum leei.

== Life cycle ==
The host fish becomes infected after swallowing the pathogen. In newly infected fish, the parasites quickly penetrate the gut epithelium and spread to other parts of the digestive tract, both through the lumen of the gut, whence they can be voided as infective agents into the open water, and through the connective tissue and small capillaries surrounding the gut. The parasites can also be found in the heart, muscular tissue and other organs, suggesting that there are other means of transmission through the body, including transport via the vascular system. The life cycle of the pathogen is not known; spores seldom develop inside the turbot, and it is possible that the fish is an accidental host, or that the parasite has a two-host life cycle. The condition causes wasting, with muscle atrophy and fatigue; it is very virulent, there is no known treatment and the mortality rate is high.
