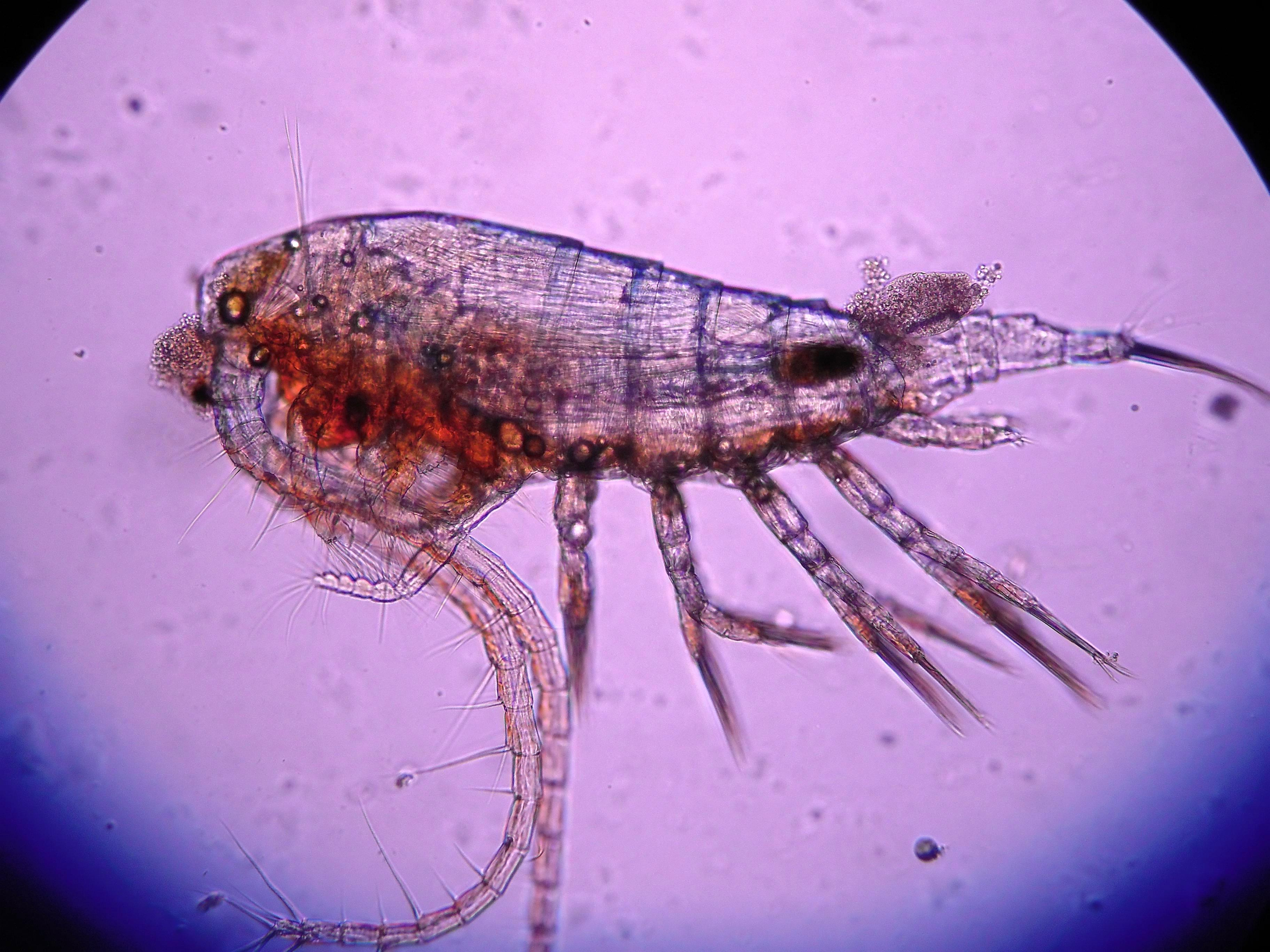
- Lateral view of Eudiaptomus vulgaris (Calanoida)

Scientific classification
- Domain: Eukaryota
- Kingdom: Animalia
- Phylum: Arthropoda
- Class: Copepoda
- Order: Calanoida
- Family: Diaptomidae
- Genus: Eudiaptomus; Kiefer, 1932

= Eudiaptomus =

Genus of crustaceans

Eudiaptomus is a genus of freshwater crustaceans in the family Diaptomidae. It contains the following species:

- Eudiaptomus aemilianus Brian, 1927
- Eudiaptomus amurensis (Rylov, 1918)
- Eudiaptomus anatolicus Gündüz, 1998
- Eudiaptomus angustilobus (Sars, 1898)
- Eudiaptomus arnoldi (Siewerth, 1928)
- Eudiaptomus atropatenus (Weisig, 1931)
- Eudiaptomus bilobatus Akatova, 1949
- Eudiaptomus birulai (Rylov, 1922)
- Eudiaptomus chappuisi (Kiefer, 1926)
- Eudiaptomus cinctus (Gurney, 1907)
- Eudiaptomus drieschi (Poppe & Mrázek, 1895)
- Eudiaptomus formosus (K. Kikuchi, 1928)
- Eudiaptomus gracilicauda Akatova, 1949
- Eudiaptomus gracilis (Sars, 1862)
- Eudiaptomus graciloides (Lilljeborg, 1888)
- Eudiaptomus hadzici (Brehm, 1933)
- Eudiaptomus herricki Streletskaya, 1986
- Eudiaptomus incongruens (Poppe, 1888)
- Eudiaptomus intermedius (Steuer, 1897)
- Eudiaptomus lobatus (Lilljeborg, 1889)
- Eudiaptomus mariadvigae (Brehm, 1922)
- Eudiaptomus pachypoditus (Rylov, 1925)
- Eudiaptomus padanus (Burckhardt, 1900)
- Eudiaptomus pusillus (Brady, 1913)
- Eudiaptomus siewerthi (Smirnov, 1936)
- Eudiaptomus vulgaris (Schmeil, 1896)
- Eudiaptomus yukonensis Reed, 1991
- Eudiaptomus zachariasi (Poppe, 1886)
- Eudiaptomus ziegelmayeri (Kiefer, 1924)
