= Paradiaptomus africanus =

Scientific classification
- Domain: Eukaryota
- Kingdom: Animalia
- Phylum: Arthropoda
- Class: Copepoda
- Order: Calanoida
- Family: Diaptomidae
- Genus: Paradiaptomus
- Species: P. africanus

Binomial name
- Paradiaptomus africanus (Daday, 1910)

Synonyms
- Lovenula africana Daday, 1910

Species of crustacean

Paradiaptomus africanus is a species of copepod in the family Diaptomidae. As an example occurrence, Lovenula africana is found within the Makgadikgadi Pans, a seasonal hypersaline wetland in Botswana.

== Related species ==
Other members of this genus are often found in certain African hypersaline lakes. For example, other species within this genus include:

- Paradiaptomus excellens
- Paradiaptomus simplex
