= Tropodiaptomus falcatus =

Conservation status
- Data Deficient (IUCN 2.3)

Scientific classification
- Kingdom: Animalia
- Phylum: Arthropoda
- Class: Copepoda
- Order: Calanoida
- Family: Diaptomidae
- Genus: Tropodiaptomus
- Species: T. falcatus

Binomial name
- Tropodiaptomus falcatus Kiefer, 1933

Species of crustacean

Tropodiaptomus falcatus is a species of calanoid copepod in the family Diaptomidae. Described by Friedrich Kiefer in 1933, it is endemic to Kenya.
