= Sinodiaptomus =

Scientific classification
- Domain: Eukaryota
- Kingdom: Animalia
- Phylum: Arthropoda
- Class: Copepoda
- Order: Calanoida
- Family: Diaptomidae
- Genus: Sinodiaptomus; Kiefer, 1932

Type species
- Diaptomus chaffanjoni Richard, 1897

Genus of crustaceans

Sinodiaptomus is a genus of freshwater copepods in the family Diaptomidae, found in Asia and Palaearctic regions. The Japanese Sinodiaptomus valkanovi has established non-indigenous populations in California, Bulgaria and New Zealand, although only the New Zealand population persists due to destruction of the habitat in California and Bulgaria. The genus was originally described as a subgenus of Diaptomus, containing only Sinodiaptomus chaffanjoni, but now contains five species:

- Sinodiaptomus chaffanjoni (Richard, 1897)
- Sinodiaptomus indicus Kiefer, 1936
- Sinodiaptomus mahanandiensis (Reddy & Rhadakrishna, 1980)
- Sinodiaptomus sarsi (Rylov, 1923)
- Sinodiaptomus valkanovi (Kiefer, 1938)
