= Eudiaptomus chappuisi =

Conservation status
- Data Deficient (IUCN 2.3)

Scientific classification
- Kingdom: Animalia
- Phylum: Arthropoda
- Class: Copepoda
- Order: Calanoida
- Family: Diaptomidae
- Genus: Eudiaptomus
- Species: E. chappuisi

Binomial name
- Eudiaptomus chappuisi (Kiefer, 1926)

Species of crustacean

Eudiaptomus chappuisi is a species of crustacean in the family Diaptomidae. It is endemic to Morocco.
