= Arctodiaptomus burduricus =

Conservation status
- Vulnerable (IUCN 2.3)

Scientific classification
- Kingdom: Animalia
- Phylum: Arthropoda
- Class: Copepoda
- Order: Calanoida
- Family: Diaptomidae
- Genus: Arctodiaptomus
- Species: A. burduricus

Binomial name
- Arctodiaptomus burduricus Kiefer, 1939

Species of crustacean

Arctodiaptomus burduricus is a species of crustacean in the family Diaptomidae. It is endemic to Lake Burdur, a saline lake in south-western Turkey.
