= Arctodiaptomus euacanthus =

Conservation status
- Vulnerable (IUCN 2.3)

Scientific classification
- Kingdom: Animalia
- Phylum: Arthropoda
- Class: Copepoda
- Order: Calanoida
- Family: Diaptomidae
- Genus: Arctodiaptomus
- Species: A. euacanthus

Binomial name
- Arctodiaptomus euacanthus Kiefer, 1935

Species of crustacean

Arctodiaptomus euacanthus is a species of copepod in the family Diaptomidae. It is endemic to India.
