= Eodiaptomus shihi =

Conservation status
- Vulnerable (IUCN 2.3)

Scientific classification
- Kingdom: Animalia
- Phylum: Arthropoda
- Class: Copepoda
- Order: Calanoida
- Family: Diaptomidae
- Genus: Eodiaptomus
- Species: E. shihi

Binomial name
- Eodiaptomus shihi Reddy, 1992

Species of crustacean

Eodiaptomus shihi is a species of crustacean in the family Diaptomidae. It is endemic to India, where it is found in the Gandhi Sagar reservoir, in the Narmada River and in a hill pool in Madhya Pradesh, and is listed as vulnerable on the IUCN Red List.
