= Dussartius =

Conservation status
- Vulnerable (IUCN 2.3)

Scientific classification
- Kingdom: Animalia
- Phylum: Arthropoda
- Class: Copepoda
- Order: Calanoida
- Family: Diaptomidae
- Genus: Dussartius; Kiefer, 1978
- Species: D. baeticus

Binomial name
- Dussartius baeticus (Dussart, 1967)

Genus of crustaceans

Dussartius baeticus is a species of crustacean in the family Diaptomidae. It is endemic to the Iberian Peninsula, having been found in south-eastern Spain, and in the waters of the Tagus estuary, the Caniçada reservoir (Cávado drainage basin), and four reservoirs in the Mondego system in Portugal.
