= Tropodiaptomus madagascariensis =

Conservation status
- Data Deficient (IUCN 2.3)

Scientific classification
- Kingdom: Animalia
- Phylum: Arthropoda
- Class: Copepoda
- Order: Calanoida
- Family: Diaptomidae
- Genus: Tropodiaptomus
- Species: T. madagascariensis

Binomial name
- Tropodiaptomus madagascariensis (Rylov, 1918)

Species of crustacean

Tropodiaptomus madagascariensis is a species of calanoid copepod in the family Diaptomidae.

The IUCN conservation status of Tropodiaptomus madagascariensis is "DD", data deficient, risk undetermined. The IUCN status was reviewed in 1996.

== Subspecies ==
These two subspecies belong to the species Tropodiaptomus madagascariensis:

- Tropodiaptomus madagascariensis madagascariensis
- Tropodiaptomus madagascariensis poseidon (Brehm, 1952)
