= Thermodiaptomus =

Scientific classification
- Kingdom: Animalia
- Phylum: Arthropoda
- Class: Copepoda
- Order: Calanoida
- Family: Diaptomidae
- Genus: Thermodiaptomus; Kiefer, 1932

Genus of crustaceans

Thermodiaptomus is a genus of copepods in the family Diaptomidae, containing the following species:

- Thermodiaptomus congruens (G. O. Sars, 1927)
- Thermodiaptomus galebi (Barrois, 1891)
- Thermodiaptomus galeboides (G. O. Sars, 1909)
- Thermodiaptomus mixtus (G. O. Sars, 1909)
- Thermodiaptomus syngenes (Kiefer, 1929)
- Thermodiaptomus yabensis (S. Wright & Tressler, 1928)

T. galeboides is restricted to Lake Victoria, and is listed as a vulnerable species on the IUCN Red List.
