= Heliodiaptomus pulcher =

Conservation status
- Vulnerable (IUCN 2.3)

Scientific classification
- Kingdom: Animalia
- Phylum: Arthropoda
- Class: Copepoda
- Order: Calanoida
- Family: Diaptomidae
- Genus: Heliodiaptomus
- Species: H. pulcher

Binomial name
- Heliodiaptomus pulcher (Gurney, 1907)

Synonyms
- Diaptomus pulcher Gurney, 1907

Species of crustacean

Heliodiaptomus pulcher is a species of copepod in the family Diaptomidae. It is endemic to India.
