= Diaptomus rostripes =

Conservation status
- Data Deficient (IUCN 2.3)

Scientific classification
- Kingdom: Animalia
- Phylum: Arthropoda
- Class: Copepoda
- Order: Calanoida
- Family: Diaptomidae
- Genus: Diaptomus
- Species: D. rostripes

Binomial name
- Diaptomus rostripes Herbst, 1955

Species of crustacean

Diaptomus rostripes is a species of calanoid copepod in the family Diaptomidae.
