= Odontodiaptomus =

Scientific classification
- Domain: Eukaryota
- Kingdom: Animalia
- Phylum: Arthropoda
- Class: Copepoda
- Order: Calanoida
- Family: Diaptomidae
- Genus: Odontodiaptomus; Kiefer, 1936

Genus of crustaceans

Odontodiaptomus is a genus of freshwater copepods in the family Diaptomidae. It includes the following species:

- Odontodiaptomus michaelseni (Mrázek, 1901)
- Odontodiaptomus paulistanus (S. Wright, 1936)
- Odontodiaptomus thomseni (Brehm, 1933)
