= Skistodiaptomus bogalusensis =

Conservation status
- Data Deficient (IUCN 2.3)

Scientific classification
- Kingdom: Animalia
- Phylum: Arthropoda
- Class: Copepoda
- Order: Calanoida
- Family: Diaptomidae
- Genus: Skistodiaptomus
- Species: S. bogalusensis

Binomial name
- Skistodiaptomus bogalusensis (Wilson M.S. & Moore, 1953)

Species of crustacean

Skistodiaptomus bogalusensis is a species of calanoid copepod in the family Diaptomidae.

The IUCN conservation status of Skistodiaptomus bogalusensis is "DD", data deficient, risk undetermined. The IUCN status was reviewed on 1st August 1996.

== Subspecies ==
These two subspecies belong to the species Skistodiaptomus bogalusensis:

- Skistodiaptomus bogalusensis bogalusensis (M. S. Wilson & W. G. Moore, 1953)
- Skistodiaptomus bogalusensis marii (Harris, 1978)
