= Heliodiaptomus =

Scientific classification
- Domain: Eukaryota
- Kingdom: Animalia
- Phylum: Arthropoda
- Class: Copepoda
- Order: Calanoida
- Family: Diaptomidae
- Genus: Heliodiaptomus; Kiefer, 1932

Genus of crustaceans

Heliodiaptomus is a genus of copepods in the family Diaptomidae, containing the following species:.

- Heliodiaptomus alikunhii Sehgal, 1960
- Heliodiaptomus cinctus (Gurney, 1907)
- Heliodiaptomus contortus (Gurney, 1907)
- Heliodiaptomus elegans Kiefer, 1935
- Heliodiaptomus falxus Shen & Tai, 1964
- Heliodiaptomus kieferi (Brehm & Chappuis, 1935)
- Heliodiaptomus kikuchii Kiefer, 1932
- Heliodiaptomus kolleruensis Reddy & Radhakrishna, 1981
- Heliodiaptomus lamellatus Sung, Shen, Sung, Li & Chen, 1975
- Heliodiaptomus nipponicus (Kokubo, 1914)
- Heliodiaptomus phuthaiorum Sanoamuang, 2004
- Heliodiaptomus pulcher (Gurney, 1907)
- Heliodiaptomus viduus (Gurney, 1916)
