= Notodiaptomus =

Scientific classification
- Kingdom: Animalia
- Phylum: Arthropoda
- Class: Copepoda
- Order: Calanoida
- Family: Diaptomidae
- Genus: Notodiaptomus; Kiefer, 1936

Type species
- Notodiaptomus deitersi (Poppe, 1891)

Genus of crustaceans

Notodiaptomus is a genus of copepods in the family Diaptomidae. It is the most widely distributed, most abundant and most species-rich genus of freshwater calanoid copepods in the Neotropics. The genus was erected in 1936 by Friedrich Kiefer for eleven species formerly placed in a wider Diaptomus. Notodiaptomus deitersi was chosen to be the type species by Raúl Adolfo Ringuelet in 1958.

The genus Notodiaptomus includes 34 valid species, and two species inquirenda. Its members include the Venezuelan endemic Notodiaptomus maracaibensis and the Brazilian endemic Notodiaptomus dubius, both of which are listed as vulnerable species on the IUCN Red List.

- Notodiaptomus amazonicus (S. Wright, 1935)
- Notodiaptomus anceps Brehm, 1958
- Notodiaptomus anisitsi (Daday, 1905)
- Notodiaptomus bidigitatus (Brehm, 1958)
- Notodiaptomus brandorffi Reid, 1987
- Notodiaptomus carteri (Lowndes, 1934)
- Notodiaptomus cearensis (S. Wright, 1936)
- Notodiaptomus conifer (G. O. Sars, 1901)
- Notodiaptomus coniferoides (S. Wright, 1927)
- Notodiaptomus dahli (S. Wright, 1936)
- Notodiaptomus deitersi (Poppe, 1891)
- Notodiaptomus dentatus Paggi, 2001
- Notodiaptomus difficilis Dussart & Frutos, 1987
- Notodiaptomus dilatatus Dussart, 1984
- Notodiaptomus dubius Dussart, 1986
- Notodiaptomus echinatus (Lowndes, 1934)
- Notodiaptomus gibber (Poppe, 1889)
- Notodiaptomus henseni (F. Dahl, 1894)
- Notodiaptomus iheringi (S. Wright, 1935)
- Notodiaptomus incompositus (Brian, 1925)
- Notodiaptomus inflatus (Kiefer, 1933)
- Notodiaptomus isabelae (S. Wright, 1936)
- Notodiaptomus jatobensis (S. Wright, 1936)
- Notodiaptomus lobifer (Pesta, 1927)
- Notodiaptomus maracaibensis Kiefer, 1954
- Notodiaptomus nordestinus (S. Wright, 1935)
- Notodiaptomus orellanai Dussart, 1979
- Notodiaptomus paraensis Dussart & B. A. Robertson, 1984
- Notodiaptomus pseudodubius Defaye & Dussart, 1989
- Notodiaptomus santaremensis (S. Wright, 1927)
- Notodiaptomus simillimus Cicchino, Santos-Silva & Robertson, 2001
- Notodiaptomus spinuliferus Dussart, 1986
- Notodiaptomus susanae (Paggi, 1976)
- Notodiaptomus transitans (Kiefer, 1929)
- Notodiaptomus ohlei (Brandorff, 1978) (species inquirenda)
- Notodiaptomus santafesinus Ringuelet & Ferrato, 1967 (species inquirenda)
