= L. africana =

L. africana may refer to:

- Loxodonta africana, the African bush elephant, a mammal species
- Lovenula africana, a crustacean species
- Lonchoptera africana, a spear-winged fly species in the genus Lonchoptera

== See also ==
- Africana (disambiguation)
