= Odontodiaptomus thomseni =

Conservation status
- Data Deficient (IUCN 2.3)

Scientific classification
- Kingdom: Animalia
- Phylum: Arthropoda
- Class: Copepoda
- Order: Calanoida
- Family: Diaptomidae
- Genus: Odontodiaptomus
- Species: O. thomseni

Binomial name
- Odontodiaptomus thomseni (Brehm, 1933)

Synonyms
- Diaptomus thomseni Brehm, 1933

Species of crustacean

Odontodiaptomus thomseni is a species of copepod in the family Diaptomidae. It is found in Uruguay and Venezuela.
