= Tropodiaptomus worthingtoni =

Conservation status
- Data Deficient (IUCN 2.3)

Scientific classification
- Kingdom: Animalia
- Phylum: Arthropoda
- Class: Copepoda
- Order: Calanoida
- Family: Diaptomidae
- Genus: Tropodiaptomus
- Species: T. worthingtoni

Binomial name
- Tropodiaptomus worthingtoni (Lowndes, 1936)

Species of crustacean

Tropodiaptomus worthingtoni is a species of calanoid copepod in the family Diaptomidae.

The IUCN conservation status of Tropodiaptomus worthingtoni is "DD", data deficient, risk undetermined. The IUCN status was reviewed in 1996.
