= Idiodiaptomus =

Conservation status
- Data Deficient (IUCN 2.3)

Scientific classification
- Kingdom: Animalia
- Phylum: Arthropoda
- Class: Copepoda
- Order: Calanoida
- Family: Diaptomidae
- Genus: Idiodiaptomus; Kiefer, 1936
- Species: I. gracilipes

Binomial name
- Idiodiaptomus gracilipes (Douwe, 1911)

Synonyms
- Diaptomus gracilipes Douwe, 1911

Genus of crustaceans

Idiodiaptomus gracilipes is a species of copepod in the family Diaptomidae. It is endemic to "a pool at Itapura", in São Paulo state, Brazil.
