= Eodiaptomus =

Scientific classification
- Domain: Eukaryota
- Kingdom: Animalia
- Phylum: Arthropoda
- Class: Copepoda
- Order: Calanoida
- Family: Diaptomidae
- Genus: Eodiaptomus; Kiefer, 1932

Genus of crustaceans

Eodiaptomus is a genus of copepods in the family Diaptomidae, containing the following species:

- Eodiaptomus draconisignivomi Brehm, 1952
- Eodiaptomus indawgyi Dumont & Green, 2005
- Eodiaptomus japonicus (Burckhardt, 1913)
- Eodiaptomus lumholtzi (G. O. Sars, 1889)
- Eodiaptomus phuphanensis Sanoamuang, 2001
- Eodiaptomus phuvongi Sanoamuang & Sivongxay, 2004
- Eodiaptomus sanoamuangae Reddy & Dumont, 1998
- Eodiaptomus shihi Reddy, 1992
- Eodiaptomus sinensis (Burckhardt, 1913)
- Eodiaptomus wolterecki (Brehm, 1933)
