= Argyrodiaptomus neglectus =

Conservation status
- Data Deficient (IUCN 2.3)

Scientific classification
- Kingdom: Animalia
- Phylum: Arthropoda
- Class: Copepoda
- Order: Calanoida
- Family: Diaptomidae
- Genus: Argyrodiaptomus
- Species: A. neglectus

Binomial name
- Argyrodiaptomus neglectus (S. Wright, 1938)

Synonyms
- Diaptomus neglectus Wright, 1937

Species of crustacean

Argyrodiaptomus neglectus is a species of crustacean in the family Diaptomidae. It is endemic to Brazil.
