= Neodiaptomus =

Scientific classification
- Kingdom: Animalia
- Phylum: Arthropoda
- Class: Copepoda
- Order: Calanoida
- Family: Diaptomidae
- Genus: Neodiaptomus; Kiefer, 1932

Genus of crustaceans

Neodiaptomus is a genus of freshwater copepods in the family Diaptomidae. It contains the following species, four of which are listed as vulnerable species on the IUCN Red List (marked "VU" below):

- Neodiaptomus curvispinosus Dang & Ho, 2001
- Neodiaptomus intermedius Flössner, 1984 (India)
- Neodiaptomus laii Kiefer, 1974 (Malaysia)
- Neodiaptomus lindbergi Brehm, 1951
- Neodiaptomus lymphatus (Brehm, 1933) (Indonesia)
- Neodiaptomus madrasensis Roy, 1999
- Neodiaptomus meggitti Kiefer, 1932
- Neodiaptomus physalipus Kiefer, 1935 (India)
- Neodiaptomus schmackeri (Poppe & Richard, 1892)
- Neodiaptomus siamensis Proongkiat & Sanoamuang, 2008
- Neodiaptomus songkhramensis Sanoamuang & Athibai, 2002
- Neodiaptomus vietnamensis Dang & Ho, 1998
- Neodiaptomus yangtsekiangensis Mashiko, 1951
