= Eodiaptomus lumholtzi =

Conservation status
- Vulnerable (IUCN 2.3)

Scientific classification
- Kingdom: Animalia
- Phylum: Arthropoda
- Class: Copepoda
- Order: Calanoida
- Family: Diaptomidae
- Genus: Eodiaptomus
- Species: E. lumholtzi

Binomial name
- Eodiaptomus lumholtzi (Sars, 1889)

Species of crustacean

Eodiaptomus lumholtzi is a species of copepod endemic to Australia. It is one of only two species in the family Diaptomidae to occur in Australia, the other being Tropodiaptomus australis. It is listed as a vulnerable species on the IUCN Red List.
