= Stygodiaptomus kieferi =

Conservation status
- Vulnerable (IUCN 2.3)

Scientific classification
- Kingdom: Animalia
- Phylum: Arthropoda
- Class: Copepoda
- Order: Calanoida
- Family: Diaptomidae
- Genus: Stygodiaptomus
- Species: S. kieferi

Binomial name
- Stygodiaptomus kieferi Petkovski, 1981

Species of crustacean

Stygodiaptomus kieferi is a species of crustacean in the family Diaptomidae. It is endemic to Bosnia and Herzegovina.

== See also ==
- Stygodiaptomus petkovskii
