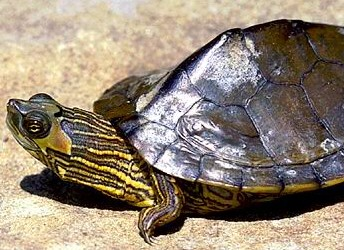
- Alabama map turtle basking on a rock

Conservation status
- Near Threatened (IUCN 3.1)
- CITES Appendix II

Scientific classification
- Kingdom: Animalia
- Phylum: Chordata
- Class: Reptilia
- Order: Testudines
- Suborder: Cryptodira
- Family: Emydidae
- Genus: Graptemys
- Species: G. pulchra

Binomial name
- Graptemys pulchra Baur, 1893
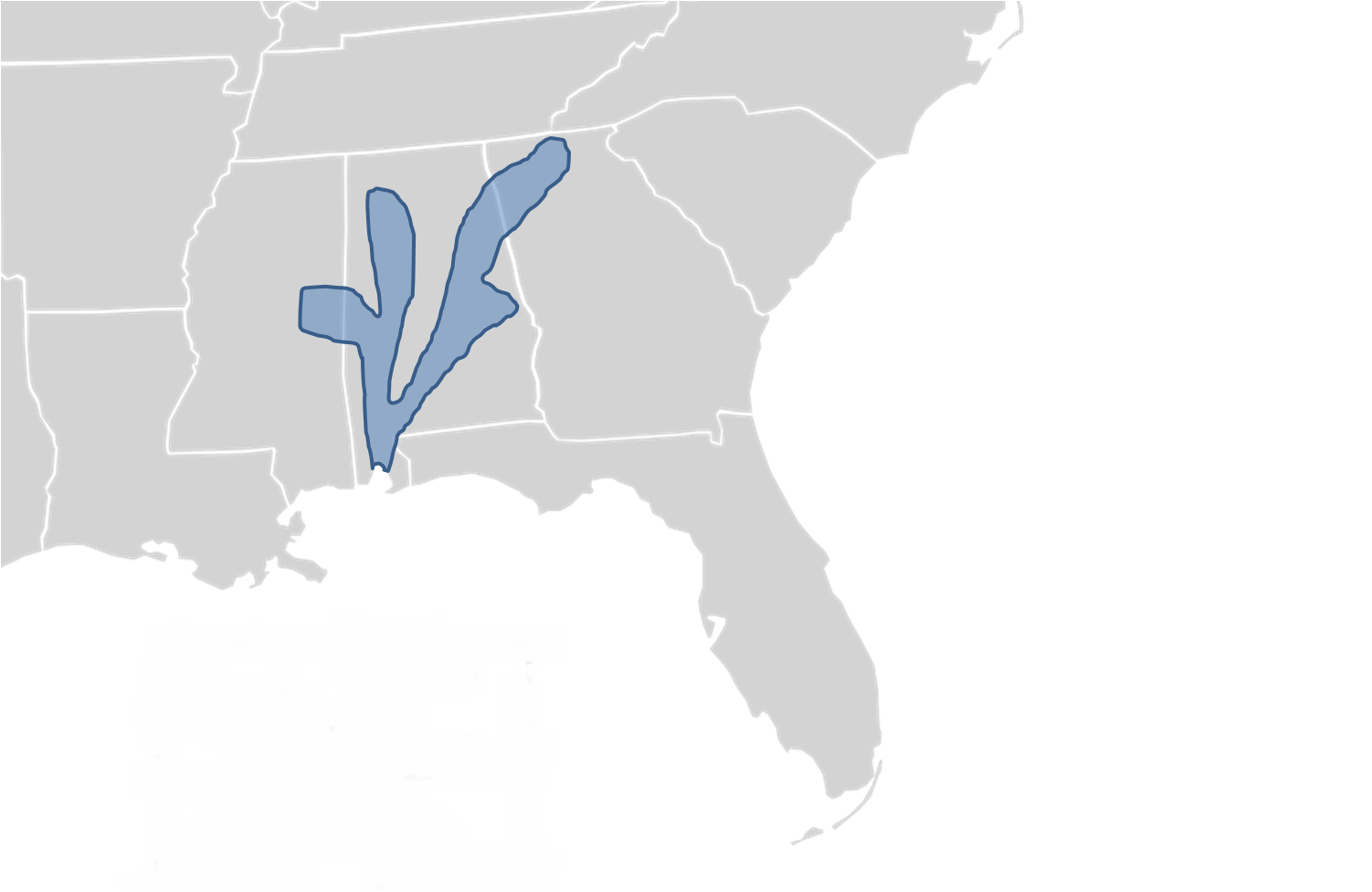
- Range map

Synonyms
- Graptemys pulchra Baur, 1893; Malacoclemmys pulchra — Ditmars, 1907; Malaclemys lesueurii pulchra — Siebenrock, 1909; Graptemys pulcra [sic] Chaney & C.L. Smith, 1950 (ex errore); Malaclemys pulchra — McDowell, 1964; Graptemys puchra [sic] Bertl & Killebrew, 1983 (ex errore); Graptemys pulchra pulchra — Artner, 2003

= Alabama map turtle =

Species of turtle

The Alabama map turtle (Graptemys pulchra) is a species of emydid turtle native to the southern United States. Differentiation from other turtle species includes a black stripe running down the center of its back with knobs extruding from it, but these projections wear down with age. T.H. Bean and L. Kumlen first collected the Alabama map turtle in July 1876 from a lake near Montgomery, Alabama. Type locality for this species is Montgomery County, Alabama. German zoologist Georg Baur described and named the Alabama map turtle in 1893. The genus Graptemys includes nine species of mostly aquatic turtles.

== Geographic distribution ==
The Alabama map turtle has a unique location to its habitat in the Southeast. It is endemic to the Mobile Bay drainage basin and inhabits the lotic (flowing water) areas of Alabama, Georgia, Florida, Mississippi, and possibly Louisiana. It ranges from the Pearl River in Mississippi and Louisiana eastward to the Yellow River in Florida and Alabama.

== Status ==
The IUCN lists the Alabama map turtle as near threatened. Alabama lists it as protected species, Georgia lists it as rare species, and Mississippi lists it as a species with special concern. The Alabama map turtle is at high risk of extirpation due to being secluded to specific river systems and human disturbances such as habitat destruction and fragmentation. In 2024, the U.S. Fish and Wildlife Service listed the Alabama map turtle as threatened on the basis of its similarity of appearance to the Pearl River map turtle.

== Description ==
Nine species of Graptemys turtles could allow confusion in distinguishing G. pulchra from other species in the same genus. A few key diagnostic features set the Alabama map turtle apart. The black stripe down the center of its back with knobs extruding from it is a diagnostic characteristic for this species that separates it from other turtle species. Adult males range from 9.0–12.7 cm (3.5–5.0 in) in straight-line carapace length and retain most coloration and pattern from its juvenile stage. Females range from 18.0–29.2 cm (7.1–11.5 in), have extremely large heads for crushing snails and mollusks, and lose a majority of their markings and patterns, becoming drabber than juveniles and males. Carapace (upper half of shell) color can be olive to dull green with a slightly visible black stripe in adults. Juveniles exhibit a dark stripe running down a more olive carapace. The outermost edge on the upper half of the shell usually contains light reticulate markings and the scutes (scale-like structure) contain a yellowish bar or semicircle. Dark rings are usually present on the lower surface of each outer scute. It contains a hingeless yellow plastron (bottom half of shell) notched in the back. A narrow black margin borders the edge of each scute. It has a brown to olive head with a large mark that ranges from light green to yellow located between and behind the eyes. The lateral and dorsal head stripes can be continuous or separated. Chin stripes are found transversally and/or longitudinally. The feet are webbed. The tail and limbs are striped. Growth rate is rapid in juveniles, but slows promptly at maturity. Females reach full size around 23 years old and can live 50 years or more in natural conditions. Females have significantly larger jaws, while males have a long and thick tail, with the vent past the edge of the carapace.

== Ecology and behavior ==
Water temperature, certain river characteristics such as prey items, variations of the species in different drainages, along with any known disease or parasite problems, is vital information to provide ideal habitat for the Alabama map turtle. Seasonal activity is determined mainly by water temperature. In one location, temperatures below 19 °C (66 °F) resulted in severe decline in feeding and activity, complete hibernation of the population did not occur, and no significant interspecific competition with other turtle species occurred. G. pulchra is found mainly in large coastal plains streams with large mollusks populations. Four geographical variants include one in the Pearl River drainage, a second in the Pascagoula drainage, a third in the Mobile Bay drainage, and a fourth in the Escambia and Yellow River drainages. No deleterious parasitism was found, but a single ectoparasite (Placobdella sp.) (leech) was on turtles during spring. The most common intestinal parasite was an acanthocephalan (Neoechinorhynchu), but was found in less than 25% of adult population. One adult female possessed a fluke (Telorchis sp.) in its small intestine. A sporozoan (Myxidium chelonarum) was noted in the bile duct and gall bladder of the Alabama map turtle.

== Habitat ==
The Alabama map turtle is endemic to the major drainage systems entering the Gulf of Mexico and has some interesting habitat qualities. The species ranges from the Pearl River in Mississippi and Louisiana eastward to the Yellow River in Florida and Alabama. Juveniles and males like shallow water with basking logs, while females prefer deeper water. Females also prefer a unique coarseness to their sandbar. Tinkle noticed the relationship of the abundance and distribution of this species to the fall line. Managers can provide optimal habitat for juveniles, adult males, and adult females by providing the necessary structure within the river system.

== Reproduction ==
Males of G. pulchra reach sexual maturity in three to four years. Females do not reach maturity until about 14 years old. Sperm may be stored in females due to sperm being present in males throughout the year and mating only occurring in autumn. Courtship sequence is similar to other species of aquatic emydines, except males use their snouts as the "titillation tools" rather than extended fore claws. Mature adult males lack fore claws altogether. Females lay an average of 29 eggs per season depending on size of female, with an average of four clutches laid per season per female. Nests are located 1–20 m (3.3–65.6 ft) from water's edge, primarily on exposed sandbars. Other Graptemys species nest up to 200 m (660 ft) from water's edge. Coarseness of sand seems to play a vital role in nest selection. Incubation averages 74 to 79 days at 29 °C (84 °F) with infertility of entire clutches common. Observed nest predators are fish crows during the day and raccoons at night. Major enemies of adult Alabama map turtles include humans and the alligator snapping turtle (Macroclemys temmincki).

== Diet ==
The Alabama map turtle feeds on an array of food items, including mollusks, insects, carrion, and vegetation, but prefers one in particular. A 1976 study found that the primary food item was the imported oriental mussel (Corbicula maniliensis), which was the most abundant macroinvertebrate in the study area. Smaller adults and juveniles feed primarily on insects, while larger adult females feed primarily on the imported oriental mussel. Feeding is between May and October, and food consumed in September and October likely was stored for winter since growth ceases in early September.
