= Mastigodiaptomus amatitlanensis =

Conservation status
- Data Deficient (IUCN 2.3)

Scientific classification
- Kingdom: Animalia
- Phylum: Arthropoda
- Class: Copepoda
- Order: Calanoida
- Family: Diaptomidae
- Genus: Mastigodiaptomus
- Species: M. amatitlanensis

Binomial name
- Mastigodiaptomus amatitlanensis (Wilson M.S., 1941)

Synonyms
- Diaptomus amatitlanensis Wilson M.S., 1941

Species of crustacean

Mastigodiaptomus amatitlanensis is a species of calanoid copepod in the family Diaptomidae. Endemic to Lake Amatitlán in Guatemala, it has not been observed since it was initially described, and may now be extinct.
