= Mastigodiaptomus galapagoensis =

Conservation status
- Extinct (2004) (IUCN 3.1)

Scientific classification
- Kingdom: Animalia
- Phylum: Arthropoda
- Class: Copepoda
- Order: Calanoida
- Family: Diaptomidae
- Genus: Mastigodiaptomus
- Species: †M. galapagoensis

Binomial name
- †Mastigodiaptomus galapagoensis Elías-Gutiérrez, Steinitz-Kannan, Suárez-Morales & López, 2023

Species of crustacean

Mastigodiaptomus galapagoensis was a species of calanoid copepod in the family Diaptomidae. The species was endemic to San Cristóbal Island, Galápagos islands. It has not been recorded since 2004 and is now thought to be extinct.
