= Arctodiaptomus =

Scientific classification
- Domain: Eukaryota
- Kingdom: Animalia
- Phylum: Arthropoda
- Class: Copepoda
- Order: Calanoida
- Family: Diaptomidae
- Genus: Arctodiaptomus; Kiefer, 1932

Genus of crustaceans

Arctodiaptomus is a genus of copepods in the family Diaptomidae.

== Species ==
The following species are recognised in genus Arctodiaptomus:

- Arctodiaptomus acutulus (Brian, 1927)
- Arctodiaptomus alpinus (Imhof, 1885)
- Arctodiaptomus altissimus Kiefer, 1936
- Arctodiaptomus anudarini Borutsky, 1959
- Arctodiaptomus arapahoensis (Dodds, 1915)
- Arctodiaptomus asymmetricus (Marsh, 1907)
- Arctodiaptomus bacillifer (Koelbel, 1885)
- Arctodiaptomus belgrati Mann, 1940
- Arctodiaptomus brevirostris Dussart, 1974
- Arctodiaptomus burduricus Kiefer, 1939
- Arctodiaptomus byzantius Mann, 1940
- Arctodiaptomus centetes Brehm, 1938
- Arctodiaptomus curdicus Brehm, 1938
- Arctodiaptomus dahuricus Borutsky, 1959
- Arctodiaptomus dentifer (Smirnov, 1928)
- Arctodiaptomus dorsalis (Marsh, 1907)
- Arctodiaptomus dudichi Kiefer, 1932
- Arctodiaptomus euacanthus Kiefer, 1935
- Arctodiaptomus fischeri (Rylov, 1918)
- Arctodiaptomus floridanus (Marsh, 1926)
- Arctodiaptomus hsichowensis Hsiao, 1950
- Arctodiaptomus jurisowitchi Löffler, 1968
- Arctodiaptomus kamtschaticus Borutsky, 1953
- Arctodiaptomus kerkyrensis Pesta, 1935
- Arctodiaptomus klebanovskyi Stepanova, 1999
- Arctodiaptomus kliei (Kiefer, 1933)
- Arctodiaptomus kurilensis Kiefer, 1937
- Arctodiaptomus laticeps (G. O. Sars, 1862)
- Arctodiaptomus lindbergi Brehm, 1959
- Arctodiaptomus lisichowensis Shen, 1956
- Arctodiaptomus lobulifer (Rylov, 1927)
- Arctodiaptomus michaeli Reddy, Balkhi & Yousuf, 1990
- Arctodiaptomus mildredi Streletskaya, 1986
- Arctodiaptomus naurzumensis Stepanova, 1994
- Arctodiaptomus nepalensis Uéno, 1966
- Arctodiaptomus novosibiricus Kiefer, 1971
- Arctodiaptomus omskensis Stepanova, 1999
- Arctodiaptomus osmanus Kiefer, 1974
- Arctodiaptomus parvispineus Kiefer, 1935
- Arctodiaptomus paulseni (G. O. Sars, 1903)
- Arctodiaptomus pectinicornis (Wierzejski, 1887)
- Arctodiaptomus salinus (Daday, 1885)
- Arctodiaptomus saltillinus (Brewer, 1898)
- Arctodiaptomus similis (Baird, 1859)
- Arctodiaptomus spectabilis Mann, 1940
- Arctodiaptomus spinosus (Daday, 1891)
- Arctodiaptomus spirulus Shen, 1956
- Arctodiaptomus steindachneri (Richard, 1897)
- Arctodiaptomus stewartianus (Brehm, 1925)
- Arctodiaptomus tianchiensis Chen & Hu, 1989
- Arctodiaptomus toni Brehm, 1937
- Arctodiaptomus ulomskyi Chechuro, 1960
- Arctodiaptomus walterianus (Brehm, 1925)
- Arctodiaptomus wierzejskii (Richard, 1888)
- Arctodiaptomus winbergi Stepanova, 2001

The species Limnocalanus johanseni was formerly included in this genus.
