= Stygodiaptomus petkovskii =

Conservation status
- Vulnerable (IUCN 2.3)

Scientific classification
- Kingdom: Animalia
- Phylum: Arthropoda
- Class: Copepoda
- Order: Calanoida
- Family: Diaptomidae
- Genus: Stygodiaptomus
- Species: S. petkovskii

Binomial name
- Stygodiaptomus petkovskii Brancelj, 1991

Species of crustacean

Stygodiaptomus petkovskii is a species of crustacean in the family Diaptomidae. It is found in Bosnia and Herzegovina and Croatia.

== See also ==
- Stygodiaptomus kieferi
