= Aglaodiaptomus marshianus =

Conservation status
- Vulnerable (IUCN 2.3)

Scientific classification
- Kingdom: Animalia
- Phylum: Arthropoda
- Class: Copepoda
- Order: Calanoida
- Family: Diaptomidae
- Genus: Aglaodiaptomus
- Species: A. marshianus

Binomial name
- Aglaodiaptomus marshianus Wilson M.S., 1953

Species of crustacean

Aglaodiaptomus marshianus is a species of calanoid copepod in the family Diaptomidae, described in 1953 by M.S. Wilson.

The IUCN conservation status of Aglaodiaptomus marshianus is "VU", vulnerable. The species faces a high risk of endangerment in the medium term. The IUCN status was reviewed in 1996.
