= Neutrodiaptomus =

Scientific classification
- Kingdom: Animalia
- Phylum: Arthropoda
- Class: Copepoda
- Order: Calanoida
- Family: Diaptomidae
- Genus: Neutrodiaptomus; Kiefer, 1937

Genus of crustaceans

Neutrodiaptomus is a genus of copepods in the family Diaptomidae. The Japanese endemic species N. formosus is listed as Data Deficient on the IUCN Red List. The genus Neutrodiaptomus contains the following species:

- Neutrodiaptomus alatus Hu, 1943
- Neutrodiaptomus amurensis (Rylov, 1918)
- Neutrodiaptomus formosus (K. Kikuchi, 1928)
- Neutrodiaptomus genogibbosus Shen, 1956
- Neutrodiaptomus incongruens (Poppe, 1888)
- Neutrodiaptomus lianshanensis Sung et al., 1975
- Neutrodiaptomus liaochengensis Chen et al., 1992
- Neutrodiaptomus lobatus (Lilljeborg, 1889)
- Neutrodiaptomus mariadvigae (Brehm, 1921)
- Neutrodiaptomus minutus (Lilljeborg in Guerne & Richard, 1889)
- Neutrodiaptomus nanaicus Borutsky, 1961
- Neutrodiaptomus okadai (Horasawa, 1934)
- Neutrodiaptomus ostroumovi (Stepanova, 1981)
- Neutrodiaptomus pachypoditus (Rylov, 1925)
- Neutrodiaptomus sklyarovae Markevich, 1985
- Neutrodiaptomus tumidus Kiefer, 1937
- Neutrodiaptomus tungkwanensis Shen & Song, 1962
