= Metadiaptomus purcelli =

Conservation status
- Vulnerable (IUCN 2.3)

Scientific classification
- Kingdom: Animalia
- Phylum: Arthropoda
- Class: Copepoda
- Order: Calanoida
- Family: Diaptomidae
- Genus: Metadiaptomus
- Species: M. purcelli

Binomial name
- Metadiaptomus purcelli (G. O. Sars, 1907)

Species of crustacean

Metadiaptomus purcelli is a species of crustacean in the family Diaptomidae. It is endemic to South Africa.
