= Tropodiaptomus ctenopus =

Conservation status
- Extinct (IUCN 2.3)

Scientific classification
- Kingdom: Animalia
- Phylum: Arthropoda
- Class: Copepoda
- Order: Calanoida
- Family: Diaptomidae
- Genus: Tropodiaptomus
- Species: †T. ctenopus

Binomial name
- †Tropodiaptomus ctenopus (Kiefer, 1930)

Extinct species of crustacean

Tropodiaptomus ctenopus is an extinct species of calanoid copepod in the family Diaptomidae.
