= Allodiaptomus =

Scientific classification
- Kingdom: Animalia
- Phylum: Arthropoda
- Class: Copepoda
- Order: Calanoida
- Family: Diaptomidae
- Genus: Allodiaptomus; Kiefer, 1936

Genus of crustaceans

Allodiaptomus is a genus of copepods in the family Diaptomidae, containing the following species:

- Allodiaptomus intermedius Reddy, 1987
- Allodiaptomus mieni Dang & Ho, 1985
- Allodiaptomus mirabilipes Kiefer, 1936
- Allodiaptomus raoi Kiefer, 1936
- Allodiaptomus rarus Reddy, Sanoamuang & Dumont, 1998
- Allodiaptomus satanas (Brehm, 1952) – endemic to India, and listed as a vulnerable species on the IUCN Red List
