= Heliodiaptomus kolleruensis =

Conservation status
- Vulnerable (IUCN 2.3)

Scientific classification
- Kingdom: Animalia
- Phylum: Arthropoda
- Class: Copepoda
- Order: Calanoida
- Family: Diaptomidae
- Genus: Heliodiaptomus
- Species: H. kolleruensis

Binomial name
- Heliodiaptomus kolleruensis Reddy & Radhakrishna, 1981

Species of crustacean

Heliodiaptomus kolleruensis is a species of copepod in the family Diaptomidae. It was described in 1981 from specimens collected in the Krishna River, Lake Kolleru and bodies of water in Guntur district, Andhra Pradesh, India. It is listed as a vulnerable species on the IUCN Red List.
