= Paradiaptomus simplex =

Conservation status
- Vulnerable (IUCN 2.3)

Scientific classification
- Kingdom: Animalia
- Phylum: Arthropoda
- Class: Copepoda
- Order: Calanoida
- Family: Diaptomidae
- Genus: Paradiaptomus
- Species: P. simplex

Binomial name
- Paradiaptomus simplex (Kiefer, 1929)

Synonyms
- Lovenula simplex Kiefer, 1929

Species of crustacean

Paradiaptomus simplex is a species of copepod in the family Diaptomidae. It is endemic to South Africa.
