= Tropodiaptomus =

Scientific classification
- Kingdom: Animalia
- Phylum: Arthropoda
- Class: Copepoda
- Order: Calanoida
- Family: Diaptomidae
- Genus: Tropodiaptomus; Kiefer, 1932

Synonyms
- Anadiaptomus Brehm, 1952

Genus of crustaceans

Tropodiaptomus is a genus of copepods in the family Diaptomidae. It includes the following species, many of which are narrow endemics and are included on the IUCN Red List (VU: vulnerable species; EX: extinct; DD: data deficient):

- Tropodiaptomus agegedensis (S. Wright & Tressler, 1928)
- Tropodiaptomus asimi Dumont & Maas, 1989
- Tropodiaptomus australis Kiefer, 1936
- Tropodiaptomus banforanus Kiefer, 1932
- Tropodiaptomus bhangazii Rayner, 1994
- Tropodiaptomus borutzkyi Stepanova in Borutsky, Stepanova & Kos, 1991
- Tropodiaptomus burundensis Dumont & Maas, 1988 (Burundi)
- Tropodiaptomus capriviensis Rayner, 1994
- Tropodiaptomus chauhani Roy, 1984
- Tropodiaptomus ctenopus (Kiefer, 1930) (Madagascar)
- Tropodiaptomus cunningtoni (G. O. Sars, 1909)
- Tropodiaptomus czekanowskii (Grochmalicki, 1913)
- Tropodiaptomus digitatus Dussart, 1981
- Tropodiaptomus doriai (Richard, 1894)
- Tropodiaptomus episcopus (Brehm, 1930)
- Tropodiaptomus euchaetus Kiefer, 1936
- Tropodiaptomus falcatus Kiefer, 1933 (Kenya)
- Tropodiaptomus femineus (Kiefer, 1930)
- Tropodiaptomus foresti Defaye, 2002
- Tropodiaptomus gemini Brehm, 1951
- Tropodiaptomus gigantoviger Brehm, 1933
- Tropodiaptomus hebereri (Kiefer, 1930)
- Tropodiaptomus hutchinsoni (Kiefer, 1927)
- Tropodiaptomus imitator Brehm, 1955
- Tropodiaptomus incognitus Dussart & Gras, 1966
- Tropodiaptomus kieferi Marquès, 1966
- Tropodiaptomus kilimensis (Daday, 1910) (Tanzania)
- Tropodiaptomus kissi Dussart, 1978 (Rwanda)
- Tropodiaptomus kraepelini (Poppe & Mrázek, 1895)
- Tropodiaptomus lakhimpurensis Reddiah, 1964
- Tropodiaptomus lanaonus Kiefer, 1982
- Tropodiaptomus lateralis Kiefer, 1932
- Tropodiaptomus laurentii Gauthier, 1951
- Tropodiaptomus loveni (Guerne & Richard, 1890)
- Tropodiaptomus madagascariensis (Rylov, 1918) (Madagascar)
- Tropodiaptomus magnus Kiefer, 1933
- Tropodiaptomus malaicus (Grochmalicki, 1915)
- Tropodiaptomus monardi Kiefer, 1937
- Tropodiaptomus mutatus Kiefer, 1936
- Tropodiaptomus neumanni (Douwe, 1912) (Kenya)
- Tropodiaptomus nielseni Brehm, 1952
- Tropodiaptomus njinei Chiambeng & Dumont, 2002
- Tropodiaptomus novaeguineae Brehm, 1959
- Tropodiaptomus orientalis (Brady, 1886)
- Tropodiaptomus oryzanus Kiefer, 1937
- Tropodiaptomus palustris (Kiss, 1960) (Democratic Republic of the Congo)
- Tropodiaptomus processifer (Kiefer, 1926)
- Tropodiaptomus ricardoae (Harding, 1942)
- Tropodiaptomus ruttneri (Brehm, 1923)
- Tropodiaptomus schmeili (Kiefer, 1926)
- Tropodiaptomus schubotzi (Douwe, 1914)
- Tropodiaptomus signatus Kiefer, 1982
- Tropodiaptomus simplex (G. O. Sars, 1909) (Lake Tanganyika)
- Tropodiaptomus spectabilis (Kiefer, 1929)
- Tropodiaptomus stuhlmanni (Mrázek, 1895) (Lake Victoria)
- Tropodiaptomus symoensi Einsle, 1971
- Tropodiaptomus turkanae Maas, Green & Dumont, 1995
- Tropodiaptomus vandouwei (Früchtl, 1924)
- Tropodiaptomus vicinus (Kiefer, 1930)
- Tropodiaptomus worthingtoni (Lowndes, 1936) (Democratic Republic of the Congo, Uganda)
- Tropodiaptomus zambeziensis Rayner, 1994
