= Onychodiaptomus louisianensis =

Conservation status
- Data Deficient (IUCN 2.3)

Scientific classification
- Kingdom: Animalia
- Phylum: Arthropoda
- Class: Copepoda
- Order: Calanoida
- Family: Diaptomidae
- Genus: Onychodiaptomus
- Species: O. louisianensis

Binomial name
- Onychodiaptomus louisianensis Wilson M.S. & Moore, 1953

Species of crustacean

Onychodiaptomus louisianensis is a species of calanoid copepod in the family Diaptomidae.
