= Paradiaptomus natalensis =

Conservation status
- Vulnerable (IUCN 2.3)

Scientific classification
- Kingdom: Animalia
- Phylum: Arthropoda
- Class: Copepoda
- Order: Calanoida
- Family: Diaptomidae
- Genus: Paradiaptomus
- Species: P. natalensis

Binomial name
- Paradiaptomus natalensis (Cooper, 1906)

Species of crustacean

Paradiaptomus natalensis is a species of crustacean in the family Diaptomidae. It is endemic to South Africa.
