= Arctodiaptomus michaeli =

Conservation status
- Vulnerable (IUCN 2.3)

Scientific classification
- Kingdom: Animalia
- Phylum: Arthropoda
- Class: Copepoda
- Order: Calanoida
- Family: Diaptomidae
- Genus: Arctodiaptomus
- Species: A. michaeli

Binomial name
- Arctodiaptomus michaeli Reddy, Balkhi & Yousuf, 1990

Species of crustacean

Arctodiaptomus michaeli is a species of copepod in the family Diaptomidae which is endemic to two lakes in Jammu and Kashmir, India.
