= Arctodiaptomus kamtschaticus =

Conservation status
- Vulnerable (IUCN 2.3)

Scientific classification
- Kingdom: Animalia
- Phylum: Arthropoda
- Class: Copepoda
- Order: Calanoida
- Family: Diaptomidae
- Genus: Arctodiaptomus
- Species: A. kamtschaticus

Binomial name
- Arctodiaptomus kamtschaticus Borutsky, 1953

Species of crustacean

Arctodiaptomus kamtschaticus is a species of crustacean in the family Diaptomidae. It is endemic to lakes in Kamchatka, eastern Russia, and is listed as a vulnerable species on the IUCN Red List.
