= Phyllodiaptomus =

Scientific classification
- Kingdom: Animalia
- Phylum: Arthropoda
- Class: Copepoda
- Order: Calanoida
- Family: Diaptomidae
- Genus: Phyllodiaptomus; Kiefer, 1936

Genus of crustaceans

Phyllodiaptomus is a genus of crustacean in the family Diaptomidae. It includes the following species:

- Phyllodiaptomus annae (Apstein, 1907)
- Phyllodiaptomus blanci (Guerne & Richard, 1896)
- Phyllodiaptomus christineae Dumont, Reddy & Sanoamuang, 1996
- Phyllodiaptomus irakiensis Khalaf, 2008
- Phyllodiaptomus javanus (Grochmalicki, 1915)
- Phyllodiaptomus longipes Kiefer, 1965
- Phyllodiaptomus praedictus Dumont & Reddy, 1994
- Phyllodiaptomus sasikumari Reddy & Venkateswarlu, 1989
- Phyllodiaptomus surinensis Orsri & Weera, 2001
- Phyllodiaptomus thailandicus Sanoamuang & Teeramaethee, 2006
- Phyllodiaptomus tunguidus Shen & Tai, 1964
- Phyllodiaptomus wellekensae Dumont & Reddy, 1993

P. wellekensae is an Indian endemic species which is listed as a vulnerable species on the IUCN Red List.
