= Zschokkella =

Scientific classification
- Kingdom: Animalia
- Phylum: Cnidaria
- Class: Myxosporea
- Order: Bivalvulida
- Family: Myxidiidae
- Genus: Zschokkella; Auerbach, 1909

Type species
- Zschokkella hildae Auerbach, 1909

Genus of cnidarians

Zschokkella are identified as parasitic organisms from the family Myxidiidae of the suborder Variisporina. The genus was first described in 1909 by Max Auerbach. The type species is Zschokkella hildae.

This genus of Myxozoa tend to inhabit common areas of their host and can be found around the globe in both marine to freshwater habitats. Zschokkella also have spore shapes and host specific parasitism that differentiates the genus from other Myxidiidae. Fish are the most common hosts, with most species of Zschokkella living in the gallbladder.

== Genus description ==
Zschokkella have features that differentiate it from other genera in Variisporina. One is that the genus seems exclusive to only infecting the host at a family level. It is suggested that due to their widespread nature, Zschokkella may parasitize on different host families based on the region or conditions they live in. Zschokkella are also able to alternate between their hosts given their morphologies. They are identified by their striations and spore size which vary between species.

Zschokkella are coelozoic, meaning they inhabit a part or parts of another organisms body. In this case, most Zschokkella inhabit parts of the excretory system in fish.

About 97 species of Zschokkella have been identified with a few species remaining unclassified.

== Reproduction ==
Zschokkella reproduce via sporogenesis. They start their lives as sporoplasms, a group of protoplasts forming the spore, that is then injected into or on the host. From sporoplasms, Zschokkella develop into trophozoites as they feed on the host. In this stage, they can develop to be either diasporic or polysporic. This means that, from the plasmodia, they are able to produce around 2-12 or more mature spores. Spores are released into the waters and latch on to fish, eventually making their way through the excretory system of the host whilst parasitizing from them and developing into new mature spores.

== Spore morphology ==
Between species of Zschokkella, there are differences in spore morphologies.

Most spores in their earlier stages are described as ellipsoidal from the sutural viewpoint and semicircular from the valvular viewpoint. Along the ends of the spores are a rounded edge. The valves of the shells are described as either smooth or having ridges, depending on the species. The sutures along the spores can be either straight, sinuous, or curved. In the spores, there are commonly two polar capsules, one on each side of the spore, both in a spherical shape. The sporoplasm which infects the host are binucleate: each cell or protoplast of the sporoplasm contains two nuclei. At maturation, spores can become elongated, spherical, reniform or other shapes depending on species. Other features such as spore size, the number of sutures on a spore, and the shape of the polar capsules also vary between species of Zschokkella.

== Common areas of infection ==
Fish are the most common hosts for Zschokkella. The area infected is dependent on the species of Zschokkella parasitizing on the fish. Most species of Zschokkella live in the gallbladder of fish. Some species live in the kidneys or renal tubules of fish while others live in the urinary tract and ureters of fish. Researchers found this as they identified Zschokkella in the urine and bile of fish.

== Species ==
- Zschokkella acheilognathi Kudo, 1916
- Zschokkella admiranda Yurakhno, 1993
- Zschokkella atlantica Gaevskaya, Kovaljova & Krasin, 1985
- Zschokkella auratis Rocha, Casal, Rangel, Severino, Castro, Azevedo & Santos, 2013
- Zschokkella australis Kovaleva, Rodjuk & Grudney, 2002
- Zschokkella balistoidi Heiniger & Adlard, 2014
- Zschokkella bicarinatis Heiniger & Adlard, 2014
- Zschokkella botia Ma, 1998
- Zschokkella candia Kalatzis, Kokkari & Katharios, 2015
- Zschokkella carassii Nie & Li, 1973
- Zschokkella cardinalis Heiniger & Adlard, 2014
- Zschokkella cascasiensis Sarkar, 1995
- Zschokkella channae Sarkar, 2004
- Zschokkella chiliensis Xiao & Feng, 1997
- Zschokkella chungshanensis Chen & Hsieh, 1984
- Zschokkella cirrhinae Sarkar, 2004
- Zschokkella coelatusae Sarkar, 2010
- Zschokkella compressis Heiniger & Adlard, 2014
- Zschokkella costata Kashkovski, 1966
- Zschokkella ctenopharyngodonis Chen, 1998
- Zschokkella cyprini Qadri, 1962
- Zschokkella dogieli Pogoreltseva, 1964
- Zschokkella donecae Ky, 1971
- Zschokkella egyptica Abdel-Baki & Abdel-Ghaffar, 2007
- Zschokkella embiotocidis Moser & Haldorson, 1976
- Zschokkella epinepheli Bouderbala, Rangel, Santos & Bahri, 2020
- Zschokkella flexuosasuturalis Evdokimova, 1977
- Zschokkella floridanae Rapacz, Iversen & Feigenbaum, 1973
- Zschokkella fossilae Chakravarty, 1943
- Zschokkella ganapatii Dorothy & Kalavati, 1995
- Zschokkella globulosa Davis, 1917
- Zschokkella glossogobii Kalavati & Vaidehi, 1991
- Zschokkella gobidiensis Sarkar & Ghosh, 1991
- Zschokkella gobii Zhao & Ma, 1994
- Zschokkella helmii Abdel-Ghaffar, Ali, Al Quraishy, Entzeroth, Abdel-Baki, Al Farraj & Bashtar, 2007
- Zschokkella heronensis Moser, Kent & Dennis, 1989
- Zschokkella hildae Auerbach, 1909
- Zschokkella labeonis Kumari, 1969
- Zschokkella leptatherinae Su & White, 1995
- Zschokkella linghuensis Chen & Hsieh, 1984
- Zschokkella lophii Freeman, Yokoyama & Ogawa, 2008
- Zschokkella lyssemisi Chakravarty, 1940
- Zschokkella macrocapsula Su & White, 1994
- Zschokkella macrouri Gaevskaya, Kovaljova & Krasin, 1985
- Zschokkella magna Chen & Hsieh, 1984
- Zschokkella mahseni El-Monem, Bayoumy & Hassanain, 2005
- Zschokkella meglitschi Moser & Noble, 1977
- Zschokkella melanosticti (Kalavati & Narasimhamurti, 1987)
- Zschokkella menopterusi Zhao & Ma, 1998
- Zschokkella microcapsula Moser & Noble, 1977
- Zschokkella minuta Nie & Li, 1973
- Zschokkella monopterusi Zhao & Ma, 1999
- Zschokkella mugili Chen & Hsieh, 1984
- Zschokkella mugilidae Kpatcha, Diebakate & Toguebaye, 1996
- Zschokkella mystae Sarkar, 2010
- Zschokkella nanhaiensis Chen & Hsieh, 1984
- Zschokkella nilei Abdel-Ghaffar, El-Toukhy, Al-Quraishy, Al-Rasheid, Abdel-Baki, Hegazy & Bashtar, 2008
- Zschokkella nova Klokačewa, 1914
- Zschokkella ohlalae Heiniger & Adlard, 2014
- Zschokkella ophicephali Lalitha Kumari, 1969
- Zschokkella ophiocephali Chen & Hsieh, 1973
- Zschokkella orientalis Konovalov & Shulman, 1966
- Zschokkella ovata (Dunkerly, 1920)
- Zschokkella oviformis Ma, Dong & Wang, 1982
- Zschokkella parasiluri Fujita, 1927
- Zschokkella platystomusi Sarkar, 1987
- Zschokkella pleomorpha Lom & Dyková, 1995
- Zschokkella pseudasciaena Sarkar, 1996
- Zschokkella pseudolaubuci Ma, 1998
- Zschokkella pulchella Kovaleva & Gaevskaya, 1982
- Zschokkella rhinogobides (Nie & Li, 1973)
- Zschokkella rovignensis Nemeczek, 1922
- Zschokkella russelli Tripathi, 1948
- Zschokkella salvelini Fantham, Porter & Richardson, 1939
- Zschokkella saurogobionis Gong, Lu & Wang, 2003
- Zschokkella schizothoraxi Ma & Zhao, 1996
- Zschokkella scomberosis Sarkar, 2012
- Zschokkella shulmani Gaevskaya, Kovaljova & Krasin, 1985
- Zschokkella sichuanensis Zhao & Ma, 1998
- Zschokkella sinocylochilusi Ma, 1998
- Zschokkella soleae Yemmen, Marton, Bahri & Eszterbauer, 2013
- Zschokkella stettinensis Wierzbicka, 1987
- Zschokkella striata Shulman, 1962
- Zschokkella sturionis Tripathi, 1948
- Zschokkella szechwanensis Zhao & Ma, 1999
- Zschokkella tetrafluvi Lom & Dyková, 1995
- Zschokkella tilapiae Chen & Hsieh, 1984
- Zschokkella trachini Azizi, Rangel, Castro, Santos & Bahri, 2016
- Zschokkella tunghuensis Chen & Hsieh, 1984
- Zschokkella variabile Kovaleva & Gaevskaya, 1982
- Zschokkella yangkiangensis Chen & Hsieh, 1984
