= Neodiaptomus lymphatus =

Conservation status
- Vulnerable (IUCN 2.3)

Scientific classification
- Kingdom: Animalia
- Phylum: Arthropoda
- Class: Copepoda
- Order: Calanoida
- Family: Diaptomidae
- Genus: Neodiaptomus
- Species: N. lymphatus

Binomial name
- Neodiaptomus lymphatus (Brehm, 1933)

Species of crustacean

Neodiaptomus lymphatus is a species of calanoid copepod in the family Diaptomidae.

The IUCN conservation status of Neodiaptomus lymphatus is "VU", vulnerable. The species faces a high risk of endangerment in the medium term. The IUCN status was reviewed in 1996.
