= Acanthodiaptomus =

Scientific classification
- Domain: Eukaryota
- Kingdom: Animalia
- Phylum: Arthropoda
- Class: Copepoda
- Order: Calanoida
- Family: Diaptomidae
- Genus: Acanthodiaptomus; Kiefer, 1932

Genus of small freshwater animals

Acanthodiaptomus is a genus of Diaptomidae.

The genus was described in 1932 by Friedrich Kiefer.

The genus has cosmopolitan distribution.

Species include:

- Acanthodiaptomus denticornis (Wierzejski, 1887)
- Acanthodiaptomus pacificus (Burckhardt, 1913)
- Acanthodiaptomus tibetanus (Daday, 1907)
