= Neodiaptomus laii =

Conservation status
- Vulnerable (IUCN 2.3)

Scientific classification
- Kingdom: Animalia
- Phylum: Arthropoda
- Class: Copepoda
- Order: Calanoida
- Family: Diaptomidae
- Genus: Neodiaptomus
- Species: N. laii

Binomial name
- Neodiaptomus laii Kiefer, 1974

Species of crustacean

Neodiaptomus laii is a species of calanoid copepod in the family Diaptomidae.

The IUCN conservation status of Neodiaptomus laii is "VU", vulnerable. The species faces a high risk of endangerment in the medium term. The IUCN status was reviewed in 1996.
