= Phyllodiaptomus wellekensae =

Conservation status
- Vulnerable (IUCN 2.3)

Scientific classification
- Kingdom: Animalia
- Phylum: Arthropoda
- Class: Copepoda
- Order: Calanoida
- Family: Diaptomidae
- Genus: Phyllodiaptomus
- Species: P. wellekensae

Binomial name
- Phyllodiaptomus wellekensae Dumont & Ranga Reddy, 1993

Species of crustacean

Phyllodiaptomus wellekensae is a species of calanoid copepod in the family Diaptomidae.

The IUCN conservation status of Phyllodiaptomus wellekensae is "VU", vulnerable. The species faces a high risk of endangerment in the medium term.
