= Neodiaptomus intermedius =

Conservation status
- Vulnerable (IUCN 2.3)

Scientific classification
- Kingdom: Animalia
- Phylum: Arthropoda
- Clade: Pancrustacea
- Class: Copepoda
- Order: Calanoida
- Family: Diaptomidae
- Genus: Neodiaptomus
- Species: N. intermedius

Binomial name
- Neodiaptomus intermedius Flössner, 1984

Species of crustacean

Neodiaptomus intermedius is a species of freshwater copepod, in the family Diaptomidae. It lives in South India's inland freshwater areas of the Nilgiri Hills, Tirmala Hills, Kaza, and at Shornur. It inhabits any bodies of water in plains or elevated hills.
