= Skistodiaptomus sinuatus =

Conservation status
- Data Deficient (IUCN 2.3)

Scientific classification
- Kingdom: Animalia
- Phylum: Arthropoda
- Class: Copepoda
- Order: Calanoida
- Family: Diaptomidae
- Genus: Skistodiaptomus
- Species: S. sinuatus

Binomial name
- Skistodiaptomus sinuatus (Kincaid, 1953)

Species of crustacean

Skistodiaptomus sinuatus is a species of calanoid copepod in the family Diaptomidae.

The IUCN conservation status of Skistodiaptomus sinuatus is "DD", data deficient, risk undetermined. The IUCN status was reviewed on 1st August 1996.
