= Metadiaptomus =

Scientific classification
- Domain: Eukaryota
- Kingdom: Animalia
- Phylum: Arthropoda
- Class: Copepoda
- Order: Calanoida
- Family: Diaptomidae
- Genus: Metadiaptomus; Methuen, 1910

Genus of crustaceans

Metadiaptomus is a genus of crustacean in the family Diaptomidae, containing the following species:

- Metadiaptomus aethiopicus (Daday, 1910)
- Metadiaptomus alluaudi (Guerne & Richard, 1890)
- Metadiaptomus asiaticus (Ulyanin, 1875)
- Metadiaptomus capensis (G. O. Sars, 1907)
- Metadiaptomus chevreuxi (Guerne & Richard, 1895)
- Metadiaptomus colonialis (Douwe, 1914)
- Metadiaptomus gauthieri Brehm, 1949
- Metadiaptomus lobulifer (Rylov, 1927)
- Metadiaptomus mauretanicus Kiefer & Roy, 1942
- Metadiaptomus meridianus (Douwe, 1912)
- Metadiaptomus purcelli (G. O. Sars, 1907)
- Metadiaptomus transvaalensis Methuen, 1910
- Metadiaptomus vandouwei (Kiefer, 1930)
