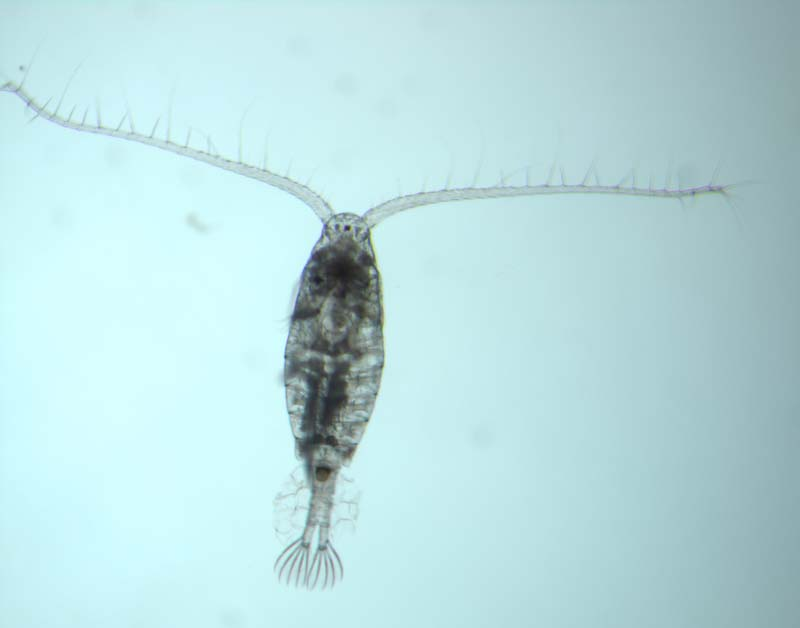

Scientific classification
- Kingdom: Animalia
- Phylum: Arthropoda
- Class: Copepoda
- Order: Calanoida
- Family: Diaptomidae
- Genus: Diaptomus; Westwood, 1836

= Diaptomus =

Genus of crustaceans

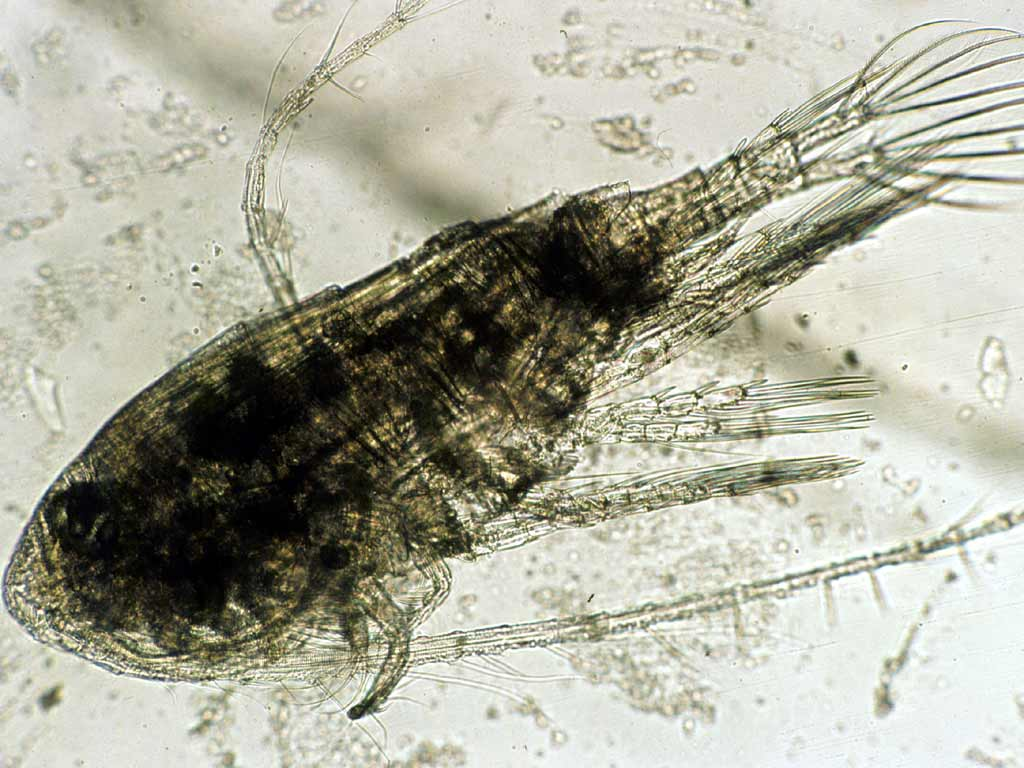
Unidentified species of Diaptomus from the Great Lakes

Diaptomus is a genus of copepods with a single eye spot. It is superficially similar in size and appearance to Cyclops. However it has characteristically very long first antennae that exceed the body length. In addition, the females carry the eggs in a single sac rather than the twin sacs seen in Cyclops. It is a copepod of larger freshwater ponds, lakes and still waters.

== Species ==
Diaptomus contains more than 60 species; many species formerly included in Diaptomus are now in separate genera such as Aglaodiaptomus and Notodiaptomus. One species, the German endemic D. rostripes, is included on the IUCN Red List as a Data Deficient species.

- Diaptomus affinis Ulyanin, 1875
- Diaptomus africanus Daday, 1910
- Diaptomus alpestris (Vogt, 1845)
- Diaptomus angustaensis Turner, 1910
- Diaptomus armatus Herrick, 1882
- Diaptomus azureus Reid, 1985
- Diaptomus barabinensis Stepanova, 2008
- Diaptomus bidens Brehm, 1924
- Diaptomus biseratus Gjorgjewic, 1907
- Diaptomus borealis (Fischer, 1851)
- Diaptomus caeruleus (Koch, 1844)
- Diaptomus caesius (Koch, 1844)
- Diaptomus carinifera Lowndes, 1934
- Diaptomus carnicus Senna, 1890
- Diaptomus castaneti Burckhardt, 1920
- Diaptomus castor (Jurine, 1820)
- Diaptomus claviger O. F. Müller, 1785
- Diaptomus cookii King, 1855
- Diaptomus cyaneus Gurney, 1909
- Diaptomus falcifer Daday, 1905
- Diaptomus falsomirus Kiefer, 1972
- Diaptomus flagellatus Ulyanin, 1874
- Diaptomus flagellifer Brehm, 1953
- Diaptomus fluminensis Reid, 1985
- Diaptomus fuscatus Brady, 1913
- Diaptomus ganesa (Brehm, 1950)
- Diaptomus gatunensis Marsh, 1913
- Diaptomus giganteus Herrick, 1881
- Diaptomus glacialis Lilljeborg, 1889
- Diaptomus guernei Imhof, 1891
- Diaptomus helveticus Imhof, 1885
- Diaptomus hyalinus (Koch, 1844)
- Diaptomus informis (Kiefer, 1936)
- Diaptomus innominatus Brady, 1907
- Diaptomus kenitraensis Kiefer, 1926
- Diaptomus kentuckyensis Chambers, 1881
- Diaptomus kincaidi Damkaer, 1988
- Diaptomus leoninicollinus Marsh, 1913
- Diaptomus ligericus Labbé, 1927
- Diaptomus lighti M. S. Wilson, 1941
- Diaptomus ligusticus Brian, 1927
- Diaptomus linus Brandorff, 1973
- Diaptomus longicornis Nicolet, 1848
- Diaptomus maria King, 1855
- Diaptomus meridionalis Kiefer, 1933
- Diaptomus mirus Lilljeborg in Guerne & Richard, 1889
- Diaptomus muelleri (Ferussac, 1806)
- Diaptomus negrensis Andrade & Brandorff, 1975
- Diaptomus nigerianus Brady, 1910
- Diaptomus ovatus (Koch, 1844)
- Diaptomus palustris Kiss, 1960
- Diaptomus pattersonii (Templeton, 1838)
- Diaptomus pictus Brady, 1913
- Diaptomus pollux King, 1855
- Diaptomus rehmanni Grochmalicki, 1913
- Diaptomus rostripes Herbst, 1955
- Diaptomus rubens (O. F. Müller, 1785)
- Diaptomus rubens (Koch, 1844)
- Diaptomus santafesinus Ringuelet & Ferrato, 1967
- Diaptomus silvaticus S. Wright, 1927
- Diaptomus staphylinus (Milne Edwards, 1840)
- Diaptomus tenuicornis (Dana, 1849)
- Diaptomus trybomi Lilljeborg in Guerne & Richard, 1889
- Diaptomus uxorius King, 1855
- Diaptomus vexillifer Brehm, 1933
- Diaptomus wolterecki (Brehm, 1933)
- Diaptomus zografi Kritchagin, 1887
