= Hesperodiaptomus =

Scientific classification
- Kingdom: Animalia
- Phylum: Arthropoda
- Class: Copepoda
- Order: Calanoida
- Family: Diaptomidae
- Genus: Hesperodiaptomus; Light, 1938

Genus of crustaceans

Hesperodiaptomus is a genus of copepods in the family Diaptomidae, containing 18 species. Two species – Hesperodiaptomus augustaensis and Hesperodiaptomus californiensis – are endemic to the United States and listed as vulnerable species on the IUCN Red List.

It is one of the most diverse genera of freshwater copepods in North and Central America, where its members live in alpine communities.

== Species ==
- Hesperodiaptomus arcticus (Marsh, 1920)
- Hesperodiaptomus augustaensis (Turner, 1910)
- Hesperodiaptomus breweri M. S. Wilson, 1958
- Hesperodiaptomus caducus Light, 1938
- Hesperodiaptomus californiensis Scanlin & Reid, 1996
- Hesperodiaptomus eiseni (Lilljeborg in Guerne & Richard, 1889)
- Hesperodiaptomus franciscanus (Lilljeborg in Guerne & Richard, 1889)
- Hesperodiaptomus hirsutus M. S. Wilson, 1953
- Hesperodiaptomus kenai M. S. Wilson, 1953
- Hesperodiaptomus kiseri (Kincaid, 1953)
- Hesperodiaptomus morelensis Granados-Ramírez & Suárez-Morales, 2003
- Hesperodiaptomus nevadensis Light, 1938
- Hesperodiaptomus novemdecimus M. S. Wilson, 1953
- Hesperodiaptomus schefferi M. S. Wilson, 1953
- Hesperodiaptomus shoshone (S. A. Forbes, 1893)
- Hesperodiaptomus victoriaensis (Reed, 1958)
- Hesperodiaptomus wardi (Pearse, 1905)
- Hesperodiaptomus wilsonae (Reed, 1958)
