= Argyrodiaptomus =

Scientific classification
- Domain: Eukaryota
- Kingdom: Animalia
- Phylum: Arthropoda
- Class: Copepoda
- Order: Calanoida
- Family: Diaptomidae
- Genus: Argyrodiaptomus; Brehm, 1933

Genus of crustaceans

Argyrodiaptomus is a genus of copepods in the family Diaptomidae, containing the following species:

- Argyrodiaptomus aculeatus (Douwe, 1911)
- Argyrodiaptomus argentinus (S. Wright, 1938)
- Argyrodiaptomus azevedoi (S. Wright, 1935)
- Argyrodiaptomus bergi (Richard, 1897)
- Argyrodiaptomus denticulatus (Pesta, 1927)
- Argyrodiaptomus exilis Dussart, 1985
- Argyrodiaptomus falcifer (Daday, 1905)
- Argyrodiaptomus furcatus (G. O. Sars, 1901)
- Argyrodiaptomus granulosus Brehm, 1933
- Argyrodiaptomus macrochaetus Brehm, 1937
- Argyrodiaptomus neglectus (S. Wright, 1937)
- Argyrodiaptomus nhumirim Reid, 1997
- Argyrodiaptomus paggi Previattelli & Santos-Silva, 2007
- Argyrodiaptomus robertsonae Dussart, 1985
- Argyrodiaptomus spiniger (Brehm, 1925)
