= Skistodiaptomus =

Scientific classification
- Kingdom: Animalia
- Phylum: Arthropoda
- Class: Copepoda
- Order: Calanoida
- Family: Diaptomidae
- Genus: Skistodiaptomus; Light, 1939

Synonyms
- Diaptomus (Skistodiaptomus) Light, 1939

Genus of crustaceans

Skistodiaptomus is a genus of freshwater copepods in the family Diaptomidae, found across North America. The genus contains eight species, three of which are endemic to the United States and are listed on the IUCN Red List as vulnerable species (VU) or Data Deficient (DD).

- Skistodiaptomus bogalusensis (M. S. Wilson & Moore, 1953)
- Skistodiaptomus carolinensis Yeatman, 1986
- Skistodiaptomus mississippiensis (Marsh, 1894)
- Skistodiaptomus oregonensis (Lilljeborg, 1889)
- Skistodiaptomus pallidus (Herrick, 1879)
- Skistodiaptomus pygmaeus (Pearse, 1906)
- Skistodiaptomus reighardi (Marsh, 1895)
- Skistodiaptomus sinuatus (Kincaid, 1953)
