= Onychodiaptomus =

Scientific classification
- Kingdom: Animalia
- Phylum: Arthropoda
- Class: Copepoda
- Order: Calanoida
- Family: Diaptomidae
- Genus: Onychodiaptomus; Light, 1939

Genus of crustaceans

Onychodiaptomus is a genus of copepods in the family Diaptomidae, containing the following species:

- Onychodiaptomus birgei (Marsh, 1894)
- Onychodiaptomus hesperus M. S. Wilson & Light, 1951
- Onychodiaptomus louisianensis M. S. Wilson & W. G. Moore, 1953
- Onychodiaptomus sanguineus (S. A. Forbes, 1876)
- Onychodiaptomus virginiensis (Marsh, 1915)

Onychodiaptomus louisianensis, a species endemic to the United States, is listed as Data Deficient on the IUCN Red List.
