= Neutrodiaptomus formosus =

Conservation status
- Data Deficient (IUCN 2.3)

Scientific classification
- Kingdom: Animalia
- Phylum: Arthropoda
- Class: Copepoda
- Order: Calanoida
- Family: Diaptomidae
- Genus: Neutrodiaptomus
- Species: N. formosus

Binomial name
- Neutrodiaptomus formosus (Kikuchi K., 1928)

Synonyms
- Diaptomus formosus Kikuchi K., 1928; Eudiaptomus formosus (Kikuchi K., 1928); Ligulodiaptomus formosus (Kikuchi K., 1928)

Species of crustacean

Neutrodiaptomus formosus is a species of calanoid copepod in the family Diaptomidae. It is found in freshwater ponds in Japan.
