= Enteromyxum leei =

Scientific classification
- Kingdom: Animalia
- Phylum: Cnidaria
- Class: Myxosporea
- Order: Bivalvulida
- Family: Myxidiidae
- Genus: Enteromyxum
- Species: E. leei

Binomial name
- Enteromyxum leei (Diamant, Lom & Dyková, 1994)

Synonyms
- Myxidium leei Diamant, Lom & Dyková, 1994

Species of marine parasite

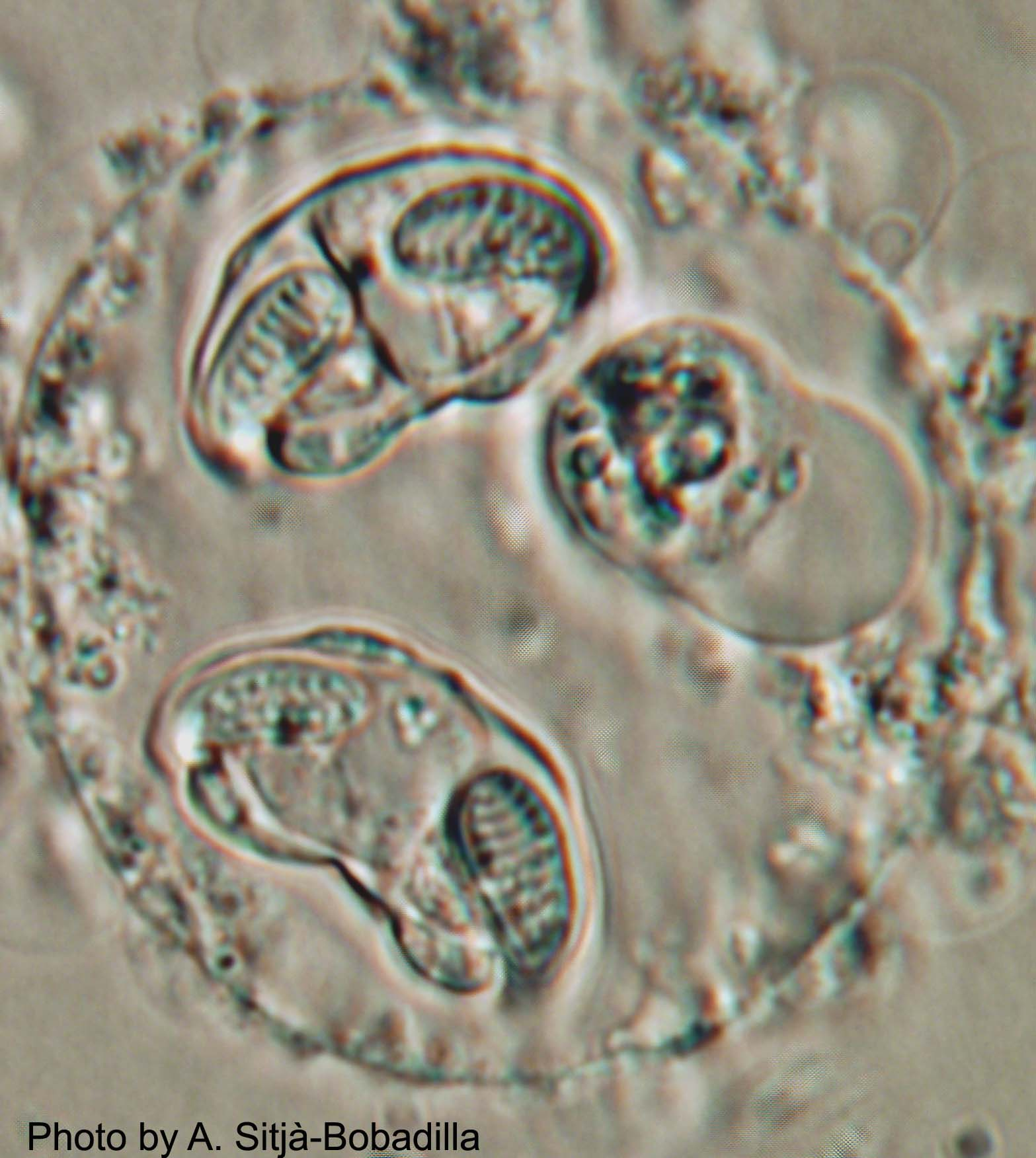
Enteromyxum leei

Enteromyxum leei is a species of myxozoan, histozoic parasite that infects the intestinal tract and sometimes associated organs, like gall bladder and liver, of several teleostean fish species. Myxozoans are microscopic metazoans, with an obligate parasitic life-style. The parasite stages of this species live in the paracellular space between fish enterocytes. It is the causative agent of enteromyxosis, or emaciative disease, also known as "razor blade syndrome" in sparid fish. E. leei has a wide host and geographical range within marine fish (at least 60 species from 22 different families, mainly Perciforms), and even freshwater fish have been infected experimentally. E. leei initially emerged in the Mediterranean in the late 1980s and it is believed to have been unintentionally introduced into the Red Sea. Its pathogenicity and economic impact depend on the host species. In the gilt-head seabream, it is manifested as a chronic disease that provokes anorexia, delayed growth with weight loss, cachexia, reduced marketability and increased mortality. In other species, it has no clinical signs. In sharpsnout seabream, infection results in very high mortality rates, which have pushed fish farmers to abandon the culture of this fish species.

== Taxonomy ==
Enteromyxum leei was formerly described as Myxidium leei, and initially reported in cultured gilthead sea bream (GSB) (Sparus aurata) from southern Cyprus. The morphology of the myxospores of this parasite differ slightly from others of the family Myxiidae: the polar capsules are located terminally and are elongated rather than subspherical (as in Myxidium), but they open to one side and their foramina are not located in the sutural plane (as in Zschokkella); the sutural line does not bisect the spore but is quite wavy, and does not reach the spore extremities (as in many Zschokkella). Subsequently, a new combination was formed when the genus Enteromyxum was erected based on molecular biology data as well as morphology. Today, the genus consists of only three intestinal species from marine fish hosts: E. leei, E. scopththalmi and E. fugu.

== Life cycle ==
The life cycle of myxosporeans generally involves two alternating hosts: fish and annelids. Myxospores are ingested by annelids, in which actinospores are produced. The actinospores released from the annelid to the water reach a fish, penetrate and the developmental stages migrate until they reach the final site of infection and develop into myxospores. In contrast to this complex life cycle, spontaneous, direct fish-to-fish transmission has been demonstrated for E. leei and other species belonging to the genus Enteromyxum in various marine fish. Horizontal transmission also occurs via effluent, cohabitation, oral and anal routes. All these trials depend on a source of infected fish, since continuous in vitro culture of this parasite, as with any other Myxozoa, has not been achieved.

Although it is possible that this myxosporean parasite also has an indirect life cycle involving an invertebrate host in the wild, such putative intermediate has never been found. Rangel et al. found an actinospore infecting the marine polychaete Diopatra neapolitana in the Aveiro Estuary (Portugal) with an 81% similarity with E. leei, but no gilthead sea bream has been found with E. leei in Portuguese waters thus far.

== Pathology and clinical signs ==
Common field observations include loss of appetite, poor food conversion rates and difficulties to reach commercial size. Clinical signs of enteromyxosis usually consist of severe emaciation with epaxial muscle atrophy. This emaciation can be noticed externally as a knife or razor-like aspect. The emaciation is best noticed in subchronic infections at mild temperatures, with dead fish usually appearing wasted (caquexic). Emaciation can be imperceptible in very susceptible species and/or at high temperatures (e.g. D. puntazzo infections with E. leei), because fish die before reaching a caquexic condition. At dissection, macroscopical signs include intestinal focal congestion and haemorrhages, and it can appear fragile and semi-transparent, often filled with mucous liquid with reduced perivisceral fat deposits, pale internal organs and occasionally green liver. Enlarged or abnormally coloured gall bladders are common in some hosts (e.g. D. puntazzo).

The histopathology shows the presence of myxozoan stages located between the enterocytes, or free in the lumen with debris in severe infections. Ribbons of epithelium containing parasite stages are detached. In advanced GSB infections with E. leei, the intestine displays hypertrophy of the lamina propria-submucosa and loss of the epithelial palisade structure, together with an intense local inflammatory response. These intestinal changes heavily impair nutrient absorption. The inflammatory response varies depending on the host. In general, more susceptible species present more marked inflammatory response and detachment of epithelium occurs earlier in the infection.

== Impact ==
The impact of enteromyxosis depends on the fish species, water temperature and the type of facilities involved in the aquaculture settings. This parasite has provoked the abandonment of the culture of sharpsnout sea bream (the most susceptible host) in some locations in Italy and Greece. E. leei constitutes a threat for many other cultured sparids, such as sharpsnout sea bream, Diplodus puntazzo; black spot sea bream, Pagellus bogaraveo, common sea bream, Pagrus pagrus, and red sea bream, Pagrus major. However, the economic impact on a global scale is unknown.

Water temperature is a critical risk factor in the transmission and onset of enteromyxosis. A clear relationship between infection and water temperature has been demonstrated. The onset of the disease is largely delayed or even suppressed at low temperatures (below 15 °C). However, the infection can remain latent during the cooler period within the fish and re-emerge when water temperature increases. This has important epizootiological consequences, since false negatives (during winter) are a source of the parasite when water temperatures rise.

The enteromyxosis has been described in all types of farming facilities (concrete/PVC tanks, earth ponds, sea cages). In gilthead sea bream land-based facilities other risk or aggravating factors include: (i) poor water exchange and/or re-intake of contaminated effluent water; (ii) recirculation systems; (iii) a prolonged culture period necessary for production of large fish; and (iv) age/size of fish at entering sea cages. Other authors considered enteromyxosis to be associated with overfeeding and the use of diets with a high fat content; a diet containing vegetable oils as the major source of lipids induced a worse disease outcome in GSB, and a change from herbivorous to carnivorous diets in exhibition aquaria. In all the cases, the unique mode of horizontal transmission favours the spread of enteromyxosis in cultured fish stocks.

== Diagnosis ==
Enteromyxosis cannot be diagnosed directly from the clinical signs, since these are nonspecific. Confirmatory diagnosis usually consists of the detection of Enteromyxum spores or other proliferative stages in smears of the intestine, either fresh or stained with diff-quick or May-Grunwald Giemsa. Detection of developmental stages in fresh smears is difficult and requires considerable experience. The examination of histological sections of intestine is the standard procedure, with the help of some stainings, such as periodic acid-Schiff (PAS), Giemsa or toluidine blue, or some lectins. However, when the parasite is in low numbers or with a patchy distribution, the infection may be missed.

More recently, oligonucleotide probes have been used for the diagnosis of enteromyxosis using PCR and in situ hybridization (ISH). A non-lethal sampling procedure has been developed for PCR detection of E. leei by probing the rectum with a cotton swab. This procedure has been validated against a gold standard (histological observation of the whole digestive tract), with a high sensitivity (0.96) and specificity (Palenzuela, unpublished data).

== Treatments ==
There are currently no approved therapies for E. leei.

== Other control strategies ==
Prevention is the main focus for managing E. leei. Once the parasite becomes established, they are generally eradicated only with aggressive actions that include eliminating infected fish, disinfecting tanks, sea cages, drying ponds, etc.

As this parasite cannot survive in freshwater, hyposalinity treatment has been suggested to control the infection in anemone fish. Some dietary additives have been proven to reduce the infections levels and/or some disease signs, such as weight loss.

== Research ==
Most of the research conducted on this parasite has been focused on gilthead sea bream and, more recently, in olive flounder (Paralichthys olivaceus). Recent efforts in the framework of the EU funded Horizon2020 Project ParaFishControl have been focused on obtaining transcriptomic data to find vaccine candidates and therapeutic targets, deciphering the host immune response and finding possible nutraceutical solutions. In addition, epidemiological studies are being conducted in the Mediterranean basin to determine the true impact of enteromyxosis and the host/farm factors that enhance or mitigate its extension. A protocol for the standard procedure to transmit this enteromyxosis under experimental conditions will be part of a guide to be published by 5M Publishing.

In regard to the immune response in GSB enteromyxosis, serum immunoglobulins, lysozyme, peroxidases and complement are enrolled in the humoral response, and B cells, T cells, mast cells and melanomacrophages act locally and systemically during the inflammatory response. Mucin composition and expression, and mucus-secreting goblet cell distribution are also modulated during enteromyxosis. Chronic exposure to the parasite stimulates gene expression related to interferon signalling and antigen processing and presentation in the intestine of exposed non-parasitized fish, which may point to the local triggering of immune resistance mechanisms against the infection. An increase in the splenic melanomacrophage centres during GSB enteromyxosis may also indicate the onset of an acquired immune response. Interleukin (IL) expression during GSB enteromyxosis is modulated from a pro-inflammatory to an anti-inflammatory profile, and this shift is apparently driven by the up-regulation of il10. More recently, the involvement of cytotoxic T cells in the clearance of the parasite has been suggested from the higher expression of cd8 in exposed but non-parasitized fish intestines.
