= Spelaeodiaptomus =

Conservation status
- Data Deficient (IUCN 2.3)

Scientific classification
- Kingdom: Animalia
- Phylum: Arthropoda
- Class: Copepoda
- Order: Calanoida
- Family: Diaptomidae
- Genus: Spelaeodiaptomus; Dussart, 1970
- Species: S. rouchi

Binomial name
- Spelaeodiaptomus rouchi Dussart, 1970

Genus of crustaceans

Spelaeodiaptomus is a genus of copepods in the family Diaptomidae. It is monotypic, being represented by the single species, Spelaeodiaptomus rouchi. It is endemic to France.
