= Enteromyxum =

Scientific classification
- Kingdom: Animalia
- Phylum: Cnidaria
- Class: Myxozoa
- Order: Bivalvulida
- Family: Myxidiidae
- Genus: Enteromyxum; Palenzuela, Redondo & Alvarez-Pellitero, 2002

Genus of marine parasites

Enteromyxum is a genus of myxozoans.

== Species ==
The World Register of Marine Species includes the following species in the genus:

- Enteromyxum fugu (Tun, Yokoyama, Ogawa & Wakayabashi, 2002)
- Enteromyxum leei (Diamant, Lom & Dyková, 1994)
- Enteromyxum scophthalmi Palenzuela, Redondo & Alvarez-Pellitero, 2002
