= Stygodiaptomus =

Scientific classification
- Domain: Eukaryota
- Kingdom: Animalia
- Phylum: Arthropoda
- Class: Copepoda
- Order: Calanoida
- Family: Diaptomidae
- Genus: Stygodiaptomus; Petkovski, 1981

Genus of crustaceans

Stygodiaptomus is a genus of copepods in the family Diaptomidae, containing the following species:

- Stygodiaptomus ferus Karanovic, 1999
- Stygodiaptomus kieferi Petkovski, 1981
- Stygodiaptomus petkovskii Brancelj, 1991
