= Mastigodiaptomus =

Scientific classification
- Kingdom: Animalia
- Phylum: Arthropoda
- Class: Copepoda
- Order: Calanoida
- Family: Diaptomidae
- Genus: Mastigodiaptomus; Light, 1939

Genus of crustaceans

Mastigodiaptomus is a genus of Neotropical copepods in the family Diaptomidae. Two of the eight species in the genus are listed as Data Deficient (DD) on the IUCN Red List, and one is listed as a vulnerable species (VU):

- Mastigodiaptomus albuquerquensis (Herrick, 1895) – Mexico, United States
- Mastigodiaptomus amatitlanensis (M. S. Wilson, 1941) – Guatemala
- Mastigodiaptomus galapagoensis – Galápagos islands
- Mastigodiaptomus nesus Bowman, 1986 – southeastern Mexico
- Mastigodiaptomus purpureus (Marsh, 1907) – Cuba, Haiti
- Mastigodiaptomus reidae Suárez-Morales & Elías-Gutiérrez, 2000 – Campeche
- Mastigodiaptomus texensis M. S. Wilson, 1953 – Tamaulipas, Yucatán Peninsula
