= Paradiaptomus =

Scientific classification
- Domain: Eukaryota
- Kingdom: Animalia
- Phylum: Arthropoda
- Class: Copepoda
- Order: Calanoida
- Family: Diaptomidae
- Genus: Paradiaptomus; Daday, 1910

Genus of crustaceans

Paradiaptomus is a genus of crustacean in the family Diaptomidae. It includes the following species:

- Paradiaptomus africanus (Daday, 1910)
- Paradiaptomus alluaudi (Guerne & Richard, 1890)
- Paradiaptomus barnardi (G. O. Sars, 1927)
- Paradiaptomus biramata Lowndes, 1930
- Paradiaptomus desertorum Manuilova, 1951
- Paradiaptomus excellens (Kiefer, 1929)
- Paradiaptomus falcifer (Lovén, 1846)
- Paradiaptomus furcata (Brehm, 1958)
- Paradiaptomus greeni (Gurney, 1906)
- Paradiaptomus hameri Rayner, 1999
- Paradiaptomus lamellatus G. O. Sars, 1895
- Paradiaptomus meus (Gurney, 1905)
- Paradiaptomus natalensis (Cooper, 1906)
- Paradiaptomus peninsularis Rayner, 1999
- Paradiaptomus rex Gauthier, 1951
- Paradiaptomus schultzei Douwe, 1912
- Paradiaptomus similis Douwe, 1912
- Paradiaptomus simplex (Kiefer, 1929)
- Paradiaptomus warreni Rayner, 1999
