= Hemidiaptomus =

Scientific classification
- Domain: Eukaryota
- Kingdom: Animalia
- Phylum: Arthropoda
- Class: Copepoda
- Order: Calanoida
- Family: Diaptomidae
- Genus: Hemidiaptomus; G. O. Sars, 1903

Genus of crustaceans

Hemidiaptomus is a genus of freshwater copepods in the family Diaptomidae, containing the following species:

- Hemidiaptomus ignatovi G. O. Sars, 1903
- Hemidiaptomus monticola Weisig & Ali-Zade, 1938
- Hemidiaptomus rylovi Charin, 1928
- Hemidiaptomus tarnogradskii Rylov, 1926
