= Aglaodiaptomus =

Scientific classification
- Kingdom: Animalia
- Phylum: Arthropoda
- Class: Copepoda
- Order: Calanoida
- Family: Diaptomidae
- Genus: Aglaodiaptomus; Light, 1938

Genus of crustaceans

Aglaodiaptomus is a genus of copepods in the family Diaptomidae. They are often bright red or blue due to carotenoid pigments.

== Conservation status ==
Species distributions are known very imprecisely, and two species are listed as vulnerable species on the IUCN Red List (marked VU below); both are endemic to the United States. A. kingsburyae was described from "a roadside ditch in Oklahoma and a pool and a pond in Texas", while A. marshianus was described from Lake Jackson, Florida.

== Species ==
The genus Aglaodiaptomus contains 15 species.

- Aglaodiaptomus atomicus DeBiase & Taylor, 1997
- Aglaodiaptomus clavipes (Schacht, 1897)
- Aglaodiaptomus clavipoides M. S. Wilson, 1955
- Aglaodiaptomus conipedatus (Marsh, 1907)
- Aglaodiaptomus dilobatus M. S. Wilson, 1958
- Aglaodiaptomus forbesi Light, 1938
- Aglaodiaptomus kingsburyae A. Robertson, 1975
- Aglaodiaptomus leptopus (S. A. Forbes, 1882)
- Aglaodiaptomus lintoni (S. A. Forbes, 1893)
- Aglaodiaptomus marshianus M. S. Wilson, 1953
- Aglaodiaptomus pseudosanguineus (Turner, 1921)
- Aglaodiaptomus saskatchewanensis M. S. Wilson, 1958
- Aglaodiaptomus savagei DeBiase & Taylor, 2000
- Aglaodiaptomus spatulocrenatus (Pearse, 1906)
- Aglaodiaptomus stagnalis (S. A. Forbes, 1882)
