= Cnidospora =

Parasite with spores for attracting the host

Cnidospora is a defunct subphylum of microscopic spore-forming parasites in the defunct phylum Protozoa. The subphylum was divided into two classes, the Myxosporidea (now classified as higher-animals, i.e. Metazoa) and the Microsporidea (now classified as fungi).
