= Max Auerbach =

German zoologist

- Born: January 26, 1879; Elberfeld
- Died: November 21, 1968
- Education: University of Basel
- Known for: Research of Cnidospora
- Scientific career
- Fields: Zoology, Anthropology

Max Auerbach (26 January 1879 in Elberfeld – 21 November 1968 in Karlsruhe-Durlach) was a German zoologist known for his research of Cnidospora.

From 1897 to 1902, he studied medicine and zoology at the University of Basel, where following graduation, he served as an assistant to Friedrich Zschokke (1860–1936). Soon afterwards, he obtained his habilitation in zoology and anthropology at the Technischen Hochschule Karlsruhe (1904). In Karlsruhe, he gave lectures at the technical school (until 1934) and also at the Hochschule der Bildenden Künste Karlsruhe (1926–1945).

In 1918 he was named director of the Badische Landessammlungen für Naturkunde (Baden State Collections of Natural History), and during the following year, founded the Anstalt für Bodenseeforschung der Stadt Konstanz (Max Auerbach Institute) in Konstanz.

== Selected works ==
- Bemerkungen über Myxosporidien, 1909 – Comments on Myxosporidia.
- Die Cnidosporidien (Myxosporidien, Actinomyxidien, Microsporidien), 1910 – Cnidospora (Myxosporidia, Actinomyxidia, Microsporidia).
- Fischereibiologische Untersuchungen am Bodensee, 1920 – Ichthyo-biological investigations at Lake Constance.
