= Myxidiidae =

Scientific classification
- Kingdom: Animalia
- Phylum: Cnidaria
- Class: Myxosporea
- Order: Bivalvulida
- Family: Myxidiidae; Thélohan, 1892

Family of marine parasites

Myxidiidae is a family of myxozoans.

== Genera ==
The World Register of Marine Species includes the following genera in the family:

- Enteromyxum Palenzuela, Redondo & Alvarez-Pellitero, 2002
- Myxidium Buetschli, 1882
- Sigmomyxa Karlsbakk & Køie, 2012
- Zschokkella Auerbach, 1909
