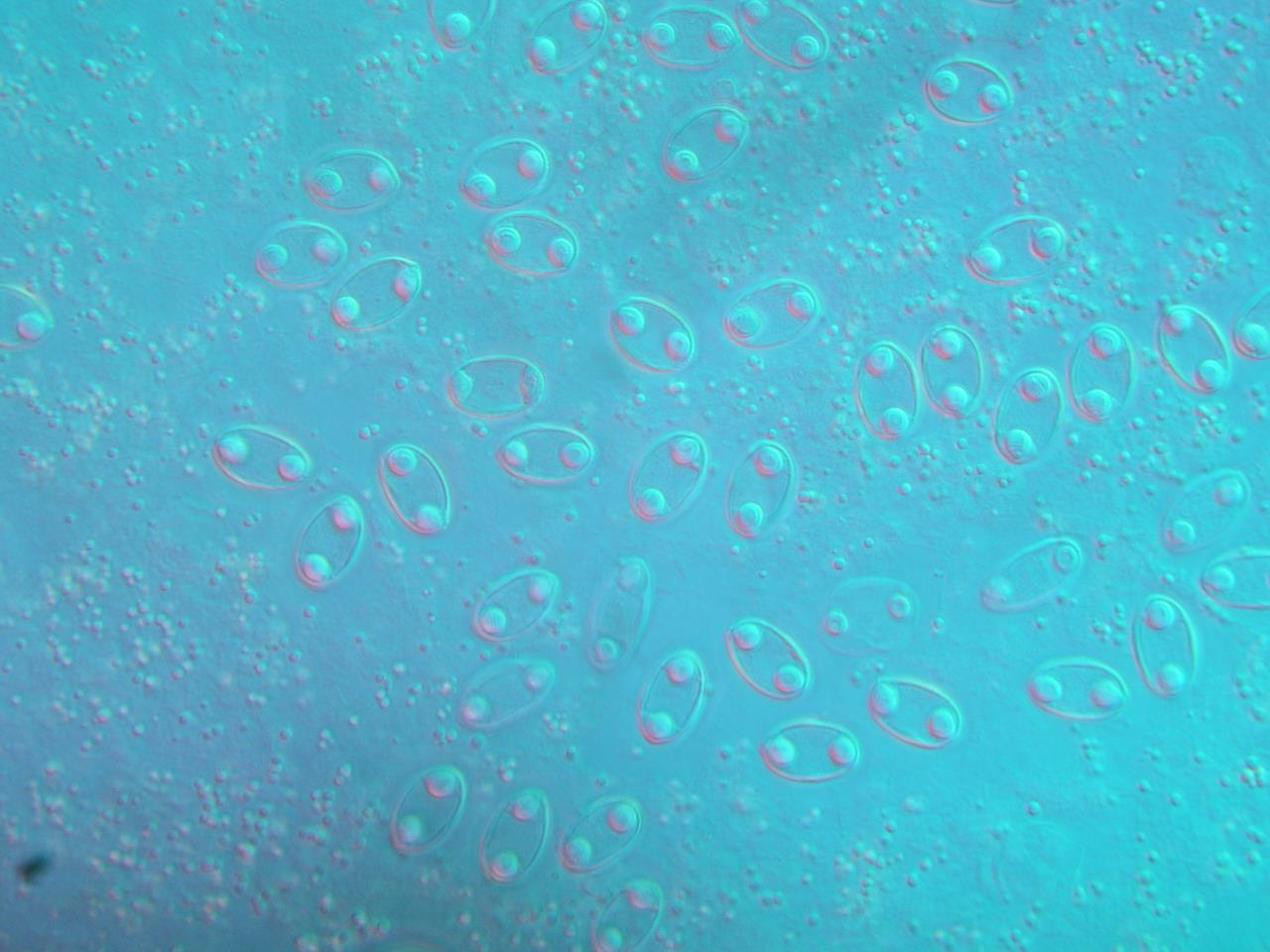
- Myxidium oviforme

Scientific classification
- Kingdom: Animalia
- Phylum: Cnidaria
- Class: Myxosporea
- Order: Bivalvulida
- Family: Myxidiidae
- Genus: Myxidium; Butschli, 1882

= Myxidium =

Genus of marine invertebrates

Myxidium is a genus of parasitic cnidarians belonging to the family Myxidiidae.

The genus has cosmopolitan distribution.

Species:

- Myxidium acinum Hine, 1975
- Myxidium adriaticum Lubat, Radujkovic, Marques & Bouix, 1989
- Myxidium rhodei Léger, 1905
