= Friedrich Kiefer =

German zoologist

Professor Friedrich Kiefer (9 September 1897 – 18 April 1985) was a German zoologist, specialising in freshwater copepods. For over 60 years, he was "the preeminent morphological taxonomist of continental free-living copepods".

Kiefer was born in Karlsruhe on September 6, 1897. He became honorary director of the Anstalt für Bodenseeforschung (Institute for Research on Lake Constance) in 1963, following the retirement of Max Auerbach. He is commemorated in the scientific names Cyclopinula kieferi and Eurytemora kieferi.
