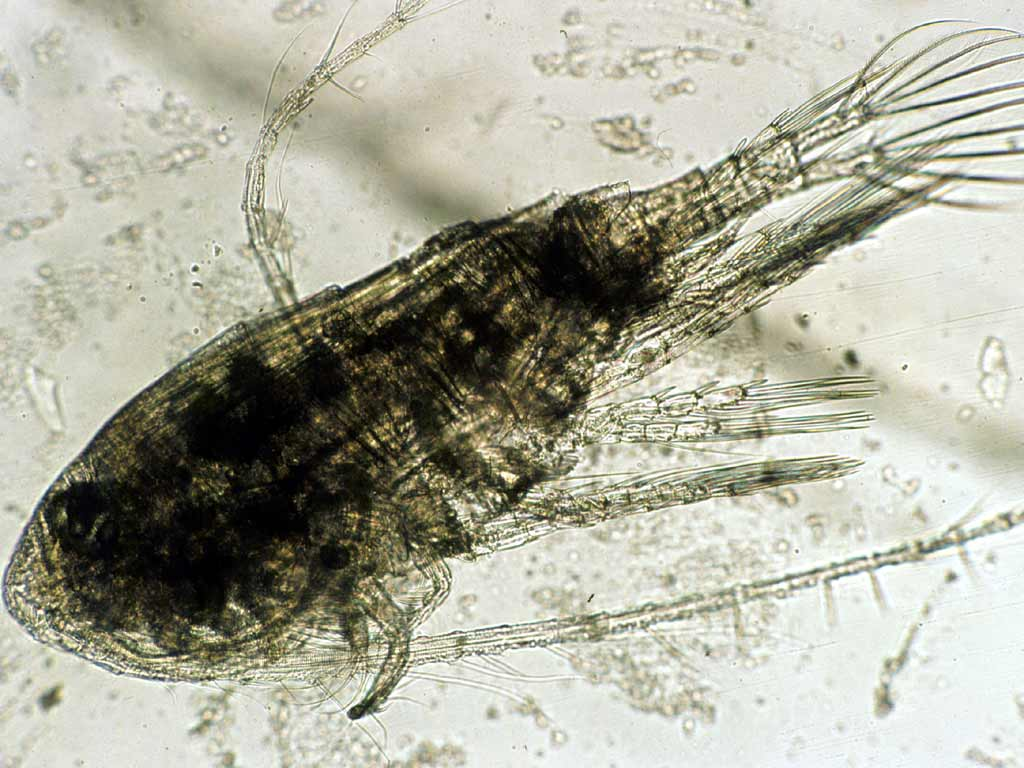

Scientific classification
- Kingdom: Animalia
- Phylum: Arthropoda
- Clade: Pancrustacea
- Class: Copepoda
- Order: Calanoida
- Family: Diaptomidae; Baird, 1850

Genera
- See text

= Diaptomidae =

Family of crustaceans

Diaptomidae is a family of freshwater pelagic copepods. It includes around 50 genera:

- Acanthodiaptomus Kiefer, 1932
- Aglaodiaptomus Light, 1938
- Allodiaptomus Kiefer, 1936
- Arctodiaptomus Kiefer, 1932
- Argyrodiaptomus Brehm, 1933
- Aspinus Brandorff, 1973
- Austrinodiaptomus Reid, 1997
- Calchas Brehm, 1949
- Calodiaptomus Kiefer, 1936
- Camerundiaptomus Dumont & Chiambeng, 2002
- Colombodiaptomus Gaviria, 1989
- Copidodiaptomus Kiefer, 1968
- Dactylodiaptomus Kiefer, 1936
- Dasydiaptomus Defaye & Dussart, 1993
- Dentodiaptomus Shen & Tai, 1964
- Diaptomus Westwood, 1836
- Dolodiaptomus Shen & Tai, 1964
- Dussartius Kiefer, 1978
- Eodiaptomus Kiefer, 1932
- Eudiaptomus Kiefer, 1932
- Filipinodiaptomus Mamaril & Fernando, 1978
- Gigantodiaptomus Kiefer, 1932
- Hadodiaptomus Brancelj, 2005
- Heliodiaptomus Kiefer, 1932
- Hemidiaptomus G. O. Sars, 1903
- Hesperodiaptomus Light, 1938
- Idiodiaptomus Kiefer, 1936
- Keraladiaptomus Santos Silva, Kakkassery, Mass & Dumont, 1994
- Leptodiaptomus Light, 1938
- Ligulodiaptomus Shen & Tai, 1962
- Mastigodiaptomus Light, 1939
- Megadiaptomus Kiefer, 1936
- Metadiaptomus Methuen, 1910
- Microdiaptomus Osorio-Tafall, 1942
- Mixodiaptomus Kiefer, 1932
- Mongolodiaptomus Kiefer, 1937
- Nannodiaptomus Dang & Ho, 2001
- Natrodiaptomus Stella, 1984
- Neodiaptomus Kiefer, 1932
- Neutrodiaptomus Kiefer, 1937
- Nordodiaptomus M. S. Wilson, 1951
- Notodiaptomus Kiefer, 1936
- Occidodiaptomus Borutzky in Borutsky, Stepanova & Kos, 1991
- Odontodiaptomus Kiefer, 1936
- Onychodiaptomus Light, 1939
- Paradiaptominae Kiefer, 1932
- Paradiaptomus Daday, 1910
- Phyllodiaptomus Kiefer, 1936
- Prionodiaptomus Light, 1939
- Pseudolovenula Marukawa, 1921
- Rhacodiaptomus Kiefer, 1936
- Scolodiaptomus Reid, 1987
- Sinodiaptomus Kiefer, 1932
- Skistodiaptomus Light, 1939
- Spelaeodiaptomus Dussart, 1970
- Speodiaptomus Borutzky, 1962
- Spicodiaptomus Rajendran, 1973
- Stygodiaptomus Petkovski, 1981
- Thermodiaptomus Kiefer, 1932
- Troglodiaptomus Petkovski, 1978
- Tropodiaptomus Kiefer, 1932
- Tumeodiaptomus Dussart, 1979
- Vietodiaptomus Dang, 1977
