= B. spinosa =

B. spinosa may refer to:

- Bolama spinosa, a spider in the family Assamiidae
- Bossiaea spinosa, a pea species
- Branchinella spinosa, a species of fairy shrimp
- Bursaria spinosa, a small shrub species

== See also ==
- Spinosa (disambiguation)
