= Branchinella apophysata =

Conservation status
- Vulnerable (IUCN 2.3)

Scientific classification
- Kingdom: Animalia
- Phylum: Arthropoda
- Clade: Pancrustacea
- Class: Branchiopoda
- Order: Anostraca
- Family: Thamnocephalidae
- Genus: Branchinella
- Species: B. apophysata

Binomial name
- Branchinella apophysata Linder, 1941

Species of small freshwater animal

Branchinella apophysata is a species of crustacean in the family Thamnocephalidae. It is endemic to Australia, where it is known only from its type locality, a shallow pool on Mount Margaret, near Laverton, Western Australia. It is most closely related to other Australian species, including B. affinis, B. denticulata, B. latzi, B. longirostris and B. probiscida.
