= List of Assamiidae species =

This is a list of the described species of the harvestman family Assamiidae. The data is taken from WCOlite (World Catalogue of Opiliones), reflected in iNaturalist. An earlier version of this listing was generated by Joel Hallan's Biology Catalog.

Many of Roewer's subfamilies are poorly justified, and further restudy of the relationships within this family await further research.

== Aburistinae ==
Aburistinae — Roewer, 1935

- Aburista — Roewer, 1935

- Aburista termitarum — Roewer, 1935 — Ghana

- Aburistella — Lawrence, 1947

- Aburistella flava — Lawrence, 1947

- Bancoella — Lawrence, 1947

- Bancoella bimaculata — Lawrence, 1947

- Banconyx — Lawrence, 1947

- Banconyx dentichelis — Lawrence, 1947

- Sokodea — Roewer, 1935

- Sokodea caeca — Roewer, 1935

- Typhlobunellus — Roewer, 1927

- Typhlobunellus formicarum — Roewer, 1927
- Typhlobunellus platypalpis — Lawrence, 1947

- Typhloburista — Lawrence, 1947

- Typhloburista pusilla — Lawrence, 1947

== Acacinae ==
Acacinae — Roewer, 1935

- Acaca — Roewer, 1935

- Acaca albatra — Roewer, 1935
- Acaca liobuniformis — (Caporiacco, 1949) — Ethiopia

- Acanthacaca — Roewer, 1952

- Acanthacaca katumbea — Roewer, 1961
- Acanthacaca upembensis — Roewer, 1952

== Assamiinae ==
Assamiinae — Sørensen, 1884

- Afroassamia — Caporiacco, 1940

- Afroassamia laevipes — Caporiacco, 1940

- Anassamia — Roewer, 1935
- Assamia — Sørensen, 1884

- Assamia aborensis — Roewer, 1913 — India (Assam)
- Assamia bituberculata — Thorell, 1889 — Burma
- Assamia gravelyi — Roewer, 1911 — Sri Lanka
- Assamia pectinata — Roewer, 1912 — Burma
- Assamia rufa — Roewer, 1927
- Assamia westermanni — Sørensen, 1884 — India (Assam)

- Assamiella — Roewer, 1923

- Assamiella marginata — (Roewer, 1912) — Burma

- Assaphalla — Martens, 1977

- Assaphalla peralata — Martens, 1977
- Assaphalla arunensis Martens, 2021 (!added post Hallan)

- Dawnabius — Roewer, 1935

- Dawnabius pectinatus —

- Gomezyta — Roewer, 1935

- Gomezyta africana — Roewer, 1935

- Gudalura — Roewer, 1927

- Gudalura biseriata — Roewer, 1927

- Metassamia — Roewer, 1923

- Metassamia bihemisphaerica — Thailand
- Metassamia bituberculata — (Roewer, 1912) — Darjiling
- Metassamia furcidens — Roewer, 1935 — Assam
- Metassamia nepalica — Martens, 1977
- Metassamia reticulata — (Simon, 1887) — Burma
- Metassamia septemdentata — Roewer, 1923 — Assam
- Metassamia sexdentata — (Thorell, 1889) — Burma
- Metassamia soerensenii — (Thorell, 1889) — Burma
- Metassamia spinifrons — (Roewer, 1915) — Sikkim
- Metassamia variata — Sørensen, 1932 — India

- Micrassamula — Martens, 1977

- Micrassamula thak — Martens, 1977
- Micrassamula jumlensis — Martens, 1977

- Neassamia — Roewer, 1935

- Neassamia siamensis — Roewer, 1935 — Thailand

- Nepalsia — Martens, 1977

- Nepalsia rhododendron — Martens, 1977
- Nepalsia betula — Martens, 1977
- Nepalsia picea — Martens, 1977

- Nepalsioides — Martens, 1977

- Nepalsioides thodunga — Martens, 1977
- Nepalsioides angusta — Martens, 1977

- Parassamia — Roewer, 1935

- Parassamia sexdentata — Roewer, 1935 — India
- Parassamia albimarginata — Roewer, 1940 — Burma

- Pechota — Roewer, 1935

- Pechota marginalis — Roewer, 1935 — Malacca

- Popassamia — Roewer, 1940

- Popassamia heinrichi — Roewer, 1940 — Burma

- Puria — Roewer, 1923

- Puria dorsalis — (Roewer, 1914) — India (Maharashtra)

- Tavoybia — Roewer, 1935

- Tavoybia quadrispina — Roewer, 1935 — Malacca

- Umtaliella — Lawrence, 1934

- Umtaliella rhodesiensis — Lawrence, 1934 — Zimbabwe

== Dampetrinae ==
Dampetrinae — Sørensen, in L. Koch 1886

- Apygoplus — Roewer, 1912

- Apygoplus longipes — (Roewer, 1911) — New Guinea
- Apygoplus bulbigerus — Roewer, 1913 — New Guinea
- Apygoplus marginatus — Roewer, 1915 — New Guinea

- Cadomea — Roewer, 1940

- Cadomea longitudinalis — Roewer, 1940 - Malaysia

- Cardwella — Roewer, 1935

- Cardwella atar — (Sørensen, 1932) — Australia

(Note: Cardwella was under Erecinae per Roewer, 1935 [reflected in Hallan catalog], but reclassified as Dampetrinae in Forster, 1955: 368, per WCO, 2023).

- Dampetrellus — Roewer, 1927

- Dampetrellus scaber — Roewer, 1927

- Dampetrus — Karsch, 1880

- Dampetrus australis — Karsch, 1880 — Australia (various)
- Dampetrus geniculatus — Sørensen, 1886 — Australia (Queensland) (See synonym Dampetrus cristatus in Forster, 1955)
- Dampetrus gracilis — Forster, 1949 — Australia (Victoria)
- Dampetrus granulatus — Sørensen, 1886 — Australia (Queensland)
- Dampetrus isolatus — Shear, 2001 — Australia (Western Australia)
- Dampetrus soerenseni — Forster, 1955 - Australia (Queensland)

- Dongmolla — Roewer, 1927

- Dongmolla silvestrii — Roewer, 1927

- Dunkeriana — Roewer, 1912

- Dunkeriana neoguinensis — Roewer, 1912 — New Guinea
- Dunkeriana borneensis — Roewer, 1935 — Borneo

- Euwintonius — Roewer, 1923

- Euwintonius continentalis — Roewer, 1923 — Australia
- Euwintonius insulanus — Roewer, 1940 — Bismarck Archipelago?, New Guinea
- Euwintonius thaiensis — S. Suzuki, 1985 — Thailand

- Granobunus — Roewer, 1912

- Granobunus ferruguineus — Roewer, 1912 — New Guinea

- Heteropygoplus — Roewer, 1923

- Heteropygoplus sublaevis — (Roewer, 1915) — New Guinea

- Hyamus — Thorell, 1891

- Hyamus formosus — Thorell, 1891 — Sumatra

- Macrodampetrus — Roewer, 1915

- Macrodampetrus bicoloripes — Roewer, 1915 — New Guinea
- Macrodampetrus unicoloripes — Roewer, 1915 — New Guinea

- Mermerus — Thorell, 1876

- Mermerus beccari — Thorell, 1876 — Java
- Mermerus thorelli — Banks, 1931 — Borneo

- Metadampetrus — Roewer, 1915

- Metadampetrus sublaevis — Roewer, 1915 — New Guinea

- Metahyamus — Roewer, 1923

- Metahyamus jacobsoni — Roewer, 1923 — Simalur Island
- Metahyamus amoensis — Suzuki, 1969
- Metahyamus bicolor — Roewer, 1935 — Borneo
- Metahyamus sutepensis — S. Suzuki, 1985 — Thailand
- Metahyamus variedentatus — Suzuki, 1976

- Metamermerus — Roewer, 1920

- Metamermerus speculator — Roewer, 1920 — Queensland

- Metamosoia — Roewer, 1915

- Metamosoia echinata — Roewer, 1915 — New Guinea

- Metanothippus — Giltay, 1930

- Metanothippus bicolor — Giltay, 1930

- Mosoia — Roewer, 1912

- Mosoia albiceps — (Loman, 1906) — New Guinea
- Mosoia biarmata — Roewer, 1940 — New Guinea
- Mosoia bulbigera — Roewer, 1915 — New Guinea
- Mosoia gracillipes — Roewer, 1912 — New Guinea
- Mosoia saylori — Goodnight & Goodnight, 1947 — New Guinea

- Neonothippus — Roewer, 1912

- Neonothippus marginalis — Roewer, 1912 — New Guinea

- Nothippulus — Roewer, 1923

- Nothippulus atroluteus — (Roewer, 1912) — Vietnam

- Nothippus — Thorell, 1890

- Nothippus affinis — Loman, in Weber 1892 — Sumatra
- Nothippus limbatus — Thorell, 1890 — Sumatra
- Nothippus tigrinus — Roewer, 1935 — Malacca

- Octobunus — Roewer, 1923

- Octobunus singularis — Roewer, 1923 — Australia

- Pahangius — Roewer, 1935

- Pahangius fasciatus — Roewer, 1935 — Malacca

- Paradampetrus — Giltay, 1930

- Paradampetrus leopoldi — Giltay, 1930

- Paranothippus — Roewer, 1912

- Paranothippus singularis — Roewer, 1912 — New Guinea

- Sermowaius — Roewer, 1923

- Sermowaius neoguinensis — (Roewer, 1913) — New Guinea

- Simalurius — Roewer, 1923

- Simalurius jacobsoni — Roewer, 1923 — Indonesia
- Simalurius palawanensis — Suzuki, 1977

- Sudaria — Roewer, 1923

- Sudaria atrolutea — Roewer, 1935 — Sumatra
- Sudaria jacobsoni — Roewer, 1923 — Sumatra
- Sudaria sarasinorum — (Roewer, 1913) — Sulawesi
- Sudaria simaluris — Roewer, 1923 — Simalur Island

== Erecinae ==
Erecinae Roewer, 1935

- Aberdereca — Goodnight & Goodnight, 1959

- Aberdereca parva — Goodnight & Goodnight, 1959 — Kenya

- Acanthophrysella — Strand, 1911

- Acanthophrysella pectinata — (Loman, 1902) — Tanzania

- Allereca — Roewer, 1961

- Allereca ruandana — Roewer, 1961

- Angolyppa — Lawrence, 1957

- Angolyppa scabra — Lawrence, 1957

- Angopygoplus — Lawrence, 1951

- Angopygoplus dentichelis — Lawrence, 1951

- Anjolus — Goodnight & Goodnight, 1948

- Anjolus malkini — Goodnight & Goodnight, 1948

- Bambereca — Kauri, 1985

- Bambereca spinifrons — Kauri, 1985 — Zaire

- Bibundina — Roewer, 1935

- Bibundina pectinata — Roewer, 1935

- Binderia — Roewer, 1935

- Binderia spinarmata — Roewer, 1935

- Boeorix — Thorell, 1889 (contra "Baeorix" in Hallan catalog, per Roewer, 1923: 246).

- Boeorix manducus — Thorell, 1889 — Myanmar

- Bolama — Roewer, 1927

- Bolama spinosa — Roewer, 1927

- Buemba — Roewer, 1935

- Buemba filipes — Roewer, 1935

- Bulobana — Roewer, 1935

- Bulobana infuscata — Roewer, 1940 — Tanzania
- Bulobana octopunctata — Roewer, 1935 — Zaire

- Bundukia — Lawrence, 1962

- Bundukia nigra — Lawrence, 1962

- Buniabia — Roewer, 1961

- Buniabia filipes — Roewer, 1961

- Callereca — Roewer, 1940

- Callereca angolensis — Lawrence, 1949 — Angola
- Callereca gracilis — Roewer, 1940 — Eastern Africa, Moshi
- Callereca teteana — Roewer, 1954

- Cerea — Sørensen, 1896

- Cerea feae — Roewer, 1927 — Bioko, "French Congo" (note 'feai' is an unjustified amendment by Staręga 1992)
- Cerea lugubris — Sørensen, 1896 — Cameroon

- Cereatta — Roewer, 1935

- Cereatta celeripes — (Loman, 1910) — Cameroon
- Cereatta elegans — Roewer, 1935 — Cameroon
- Cereatta kivuensis — Roewer, 1961

- Cereipes — Roewer, 1935

- Cereipes angustus — (Roewer, 1912) — Cameroon

- Cereodiscus — Roewer, 1940

- Cereodiscus lesserti — Roewer, 1940

- Cereoides — Roewer, 1935

- Cereoides nebulosus — (Sørensen, 1896) — Cameroon

- Chilon — Sørensen, 1896

- Chilon albatra — (Roewer, 1935) — Cameroon
- Chilon cinctus — Sørensen, 1896 — Cameroon
- Chilon horridus — (Roewer, 1912) — Cameroon
- Chilon laevituber — (Roewer, 1953)
- Chilon robustus — Sørensen, 1896 — Cameroon
- Chilon royi — (Roewer, 1961)
- Chilon salebrosus — (Karsch, 1879) — Western Africa
- Chilon scaber — Sørensen, 1896 — Cameroon
- Chilon villersi — (Roewer, 1953)

- Coleutus — Roewer, 1940

- Coleutus longipalpis — Roewer, 1940

- Comereca — Roewer, 1961

- Comereca rectipes — Roewer, 1961

- Cryptopygoplus — Staręga, 1992 (! authorship contra Hallan listing)

- Cryptopygoplus africanus — Lawrence, 1931 — South Africa
- Cryptopygoplus capriviensis — Lotz, 2011 — Namibia (! after Hallan)
- Cryptopygoplus coronatus — Staręga & Snegovaya, 2009 — Zimbabwe (! after Hallan)
- Cryptopygoplus damaranus — Lawrence, 1931 — South Africa
- Cryptopygoplus rhodesianus — Lawrence, 1931 — South Africa

- Djemia — Roewer, 1935

- Djemia cooperi — Roewer, 1935

- Dodabetta — Roewer, 1929

- Dodabetta conigera — Roewer, 1929

- Ereala — Roewer, 1950

- Ereala armata — Roewer, 1950

- Erebalda — Roewer, 1940

- Erebalda cryptostigma — Roewer, 1940

- Ereca — Sørensen, 1910

- Ereca affinis — Sørensen, 1910 — Eastern Africa
- Ereca bengtsoni — H. Kauri, 1985 — Zaire
- Ereca calcanifera — H. Kauri, 1985 — Zaire
- Ereca fusca — H. Kauri, 1985 — Zaire
- Ereca imitatrix — H. Kauri, 1985 — Zaire
- Ereca itombwensis — H. Kauri, 1985 — Zaire
- Ereca kalimabengana — H. Kauri, 1985 — Zaire
- Ereca lata — Sørensen, 1910 — Eastern Africa
- Ereca lawrencei — H. Kauri, 1985 — Zaire
- Ereca loekenae — H. Kauri, 1985 — Zaire
- Ereca lyrifera — H. Kauri, 1985 — Zaire
- Ereca maculata — Roewer, 1913 — Eastern Africa
- Ereca modesta — Sørensen, 1910 — Eastern Africa
- Ereca mwengana — H. Kauri, 1985 — Zaire
- Ereca robusta — H. Kauri, 1985 — Zaire
- Ereca rufa — Sørensen, 1910 — Eastern Africa
- Ereca sangensis — H. Kauri, 1985 — Zaire
- Ereca silvatica — H. Kauri, 1985 — Zaire
- Ereca simulator — Sørensen, 1910 — Eastern Africa
- Ereca soerenseni — Lawrence, 1962
- Ereca triareolata — Roewer, 1961
- Ereca undulata — Sørensen, 1910 — Eastern Africa
- Ereca unicolor — Roewer, 1961

- Erecabia — Roewer, 1940

- Erecabia hartmanni — Roewer, 1940
- Erecabia pluridens — Lawrence, 1962

- Erecella — Roewer, 1935

- Erecella transversalis — Roewer, 1961
- Erecella walikaleana — H. Kauri, 1985 — Zaire
- Erecella basilewskyi — Lawrence, 1962
- Erecella biseriata — Roewer, 1961
- Erecella brunnea — Roewer, 1940 — Ruanda
- Erecella flava — Roewer, 1935
- Erecella lutea — Roewer, 1935
- Erecella nigropicta — Roewer, 1961
- Erecella signata — Roewer, 1950

- Erecomma — Roewer, 1940

- Erecomma laurenti — Roewer, 1961
- Erecomma montanum — Roewer, 1940 (note: original spelling as montana subsequently altered to neuter)

- Erecongoa — Roewer, 1950

- Erecongoa gracilis — Roewer, 1950
- Erecongoa granulata — Roewer, 1952

- Erecops — Roewer, 1940

- Erecops multispina — Roewer, 1940

- Erecula — Roewer, 1935

- Erecula cincta — Roewer, 1961
- Erecula crassipes — H. Kauri, 1985 — Zaire
- Erecula leleupi — Lawrence, 1962
- Erecula marmorata — Roewer, 1940 — Tanzania
- Erecula novemdentata — Roewer, 1961
- Erecula pachypes — Roewer, 1935 — Zaire
- Erecula septemdentata — Lawrence, 1957

- Eregonda — Roewer, 1950

- Eregonda tenuis — Roewer, 1950

- Eubaeorix — Roewer, 1912

- Eubaeorix gravelyi — Roewer, 1912 — Burma

- Eupygoplus — Roewer, 1915

- Eupygoplus armatus — Roewer, 1915 — India
- Eupygoplus birmanicus — Roewer, 1936
- Eupygoplus gracilis — Roewer, 1927 — Bengal

- Fakoa — Roewer, 1923

- Fakoa spinulata — (Roewer, 1915) — Cameroon

- Gapotus — Roewer, 1935

- Gapotus frontalis — Roewer, 1935 — Malacca

- Irnia — Roewer, 1935

- Irnia scabra — Roewer, 1935

- Ivocoryphus — Lawrence, 1965

- Ivocoryphus jezequeli — Lawrence, 1965

- Izea — Roewer, 1927

- Izea armata — Roewer, 1935 — Cameroon
- Izea pectinata — Roewer, 1927 — São Tomé

- Kakontwea — Roewer, 1951

- Kakontwea leleupi — Roewer, 1951

- Kasaina — Lawrence, 1957

- Kasaina scabra — Lawrence, 1957

- Kukkala — Roewer, 1929

- Kukkala trispinifrons — Roewer, 1929 — India

- Kungwea — Roewer, 1961

- Kungwea scabra — Roewer, 1961

- Lawrenciola — Roewer, 1935

- Lawrenciola damarana — (Lawrence, 1931)
- Lawrenciola rhodesiana — (Lawrence, 1931)

- Lepchana — Roewer, 1927

- Lepchana spinipalpis — Roewer, 1927

- Lubudia — Roewer, 1951

- Lubudia leleupi — Roewer, 1951

- Lygippulus — Roewer, 1954

- Lygippulus major — Roewer, 1954
- Lygippulus nigrescens — Roewer, 1961
- Lygippulus parvulus — Roewer, 1954
- Lygippulus scaber — Roewer, 1954
- Lygippulus setipes — Roewer, 1961

- Lygippus — Roewer, 1940

- Lygippus abdominalis — Roewer, 1940
- Lygippus machadoi — Lawrence, 1951

- Maccabeesa — Roewer, 1936

- Maccabeesa lawrencei — Roewer, 1936

- Mandaria — Roewer, 1935

- Mandaria caeca — Roewer, 1935 - Cameroon

- Mbinia — Santos & Prieto, 2010 (! after Hallan catalog)

- Mbinia xenophora — Santos & Prieto, 2010 - Equatorial Guinea

- Merucola — Roewer, 1935

- Merucola granulata — Roewer, 1935 - Tanzania

- Metapygoplus — Roewer, 1923

- Metapygoplus intermedius — (Loman, 1892) — Indonesia
- Metapygoplus spinicoxa — Roewer, 1940 — Myanmar

- Metereca — Roewer, 1923

- Metereca abnormis — (Roewer, 1912) — Tanzania
- Metereca aspersa — Roewer, 1935 — Uganda
- Metereca concolor — Roewer, 1961
- Metereca differens — (Lawrence, 1957)
- Metereca katangana — H. Kauri, 1985 — Zaire
- Metereca kivuana — (Roewer, 1961)
- Metereca kivuna — Roewer, 1961
- Metereca leleupae — H. Kauri, 1985 — Zaire
- Metereca longipes — H. Kauri, 1985 — Zaire
- Metereca minuta — Roewer, 1954
- Metereca montana — (Roewer, 1912) — Eastern Africa
- Metereca papillata — Roewer, 1935 — East Africa
- Metereca paradoxa — H. Kauri, 1985 — Zaire
- Metereca ripensis — H. Kauri, 1985 — Zaire
- Metereca simples — (Roewer, 1952)

- Montereca — Lawrence, 1962

- Montereca paucidens — Lawrence, 1962

- Neobaeorix — Lawrence, 1962

- Neobaeorix cornuta — Lawrence, 1962

- Neocoryphus — Lawrence, 1965

- Neocoryphus niger — Lawrence, 1965

- Neopygoplus — Roewer, 1923

- Neopygoplus jacobsoni — Roewer, 1923 — Sumatra
- Neopygoplus siamensis — S. Suzuki, 1985 — Thailand

- Parapygoplus — Roewer, 1912

- Parapygoplus variatus — (Thorell, 1889) — Burma

- Propygoplus — Roewer, 1923

- Propygoplus maculatus — (Roewer, 1912) — Nepal
- Propygoplus siwalik — Martens, 1977
- Propygoplus rugosa — (Roewer, 1940) — Sikkim
- Propygoplus scabrisoma — (Roewer, 1940) — Sikkim
- Propygoplus tenuipes — (Roewer, 1927) — Sikkim

- Pygoplus — Thorell, 1889

- Pygoplus obscurus — Thorell, 1889 — India (Assam)
- Pygoplus ferrugineus — Thorell, 1889 — India (Assam)
- Pygoplus trifasciatus — Thorell, 1889 — India (Assam)

- Roewereca — Lawrence, 1962

- Roewereca tenebrosa — Lawrence, 1962

- Sacesphorus — Thorell, 1889

- Sacesphorus maculatus — Thorell, 1889 — Burma

- Sijucavernicus — Roewer, 1923

- Sijucavernicus kempi — Roewer, 1923 — cave, India (Assam)

- Simienatus — Roewer, 1956

- Simienatus scotti — Roewer, 1956

- Tarnus — Suzuki, 1969

- Tarnus pulcer — Suzuki, 1969. (Note: in Hallan, etc. this is often given respelling pulcher)

- Termitereca — Roewer, 1940

- Termitereca singularis — Roewer, 1940

- Tetecus — Roewer, 1935

- Tetecus tenuis — Roewer, 1935 - Mozambique

- Thobala — Roewer, 1940

- Thobala lesserti — Roewer, 1940 - Myanmar

- Tubereca — Kauri, 1985

- Tubereca biharaguana — Kauri, 1985 — Rwanda

- Tundabia — Roewer, 1935

- Tundabia semicaeca — Roewer, 1935 - Tanzania (?)
- Tundabia ugandensis — Goodnight & Goodnight, 1959 - Uganda

- Valpara — Roewer, 1929

- Valpara albitarsus — Roewer, 1929

- Vandarawella — Roewer, 1935

- Vandarawella bicolor — Roewer, 1935

- Wintonia — Roewer, 1923

- Wintonia scabra — Roewer, 1923 — Australia

== Eupodaucheniinae ==
Eupodaucheniinae — Roewer, 1935

- Eupodauchenius — Roewer, 1912

- Eupodauchenius luteocruciatus — (Loman, 1910) — Cameroon, "French Guinea"

== Filopalpinae ==
Filopalpinae — Martens, 2022

- Filopalpus — Martens, 2022

- Filopalpus altomontanus — Martens, 2022 — Ethiopia
- Filopalpus bale — Martens, 2022 — Ethiopia
- Filopalpus joschmidti — Martens, 2022 — Ethiopia
- Filopalpus kakaensis — Martens, 2022 — Ethiopia
- Filopalpus niger — Martens, 2022 — Ethiopia

== Hypoxestinae ==
Hypoxestinae — Roewer, 1935

- Adamauna — Roewer, 1935

- Adamauna maculatipes — Roewer, 1935

- Bandona — Roewer, 1927

- Bandona palpalis — Roewer, 1927 — cave, Thailand
- Bandona boninensis — Gruber, 1974

- Bwitonatus — Roewer, 1950

- Bwitonatus marlieri — Roewer, 1950

- Cleoxestus — Roewer, 1954

- Cleoxestus luteipictus — Roewer, 1954

- Congonella — Roewer, 1935

- Congonella frontalis — Roewer, 1935

- Dicoryphus — Loman, 1902

- Dicoryphus ater — (Lawrence, 1962)
- Dicoryphus furvus — Loman, 1902 — "German East Africa"
- Dicoryphus jeanneli — (Roewer, 1913)
- Dicoryphus melanacanthus — (Loman, 1902) — Eastern Africa

- Doloressus — Roewer, 1935

- Doloressus cippatus — Roewer, 1935
- Doloressus filipes — Lawrence, 1949 — Angola
- Doloressus ghesquierei — (Roewer, 1950)
- Doloressus palmgreni — H. Kauri, 1985 — Zaire

- Dongila — Roewer, 1927

- Dongila silvatica — Roewer, 1927
- Dongila spinosa — Roewer, 1927

- Findia — Roewer, 1915

- Findia atrolutea — Roewer, 1915 — "French Congo", Zaire

- Hypoxestinus — Roewer, 1927

- Hypoxestinus frontalis — Roewer, 1935 — Cameroon
- Hypoxestinus nkogoi — Roewer, 1927 — "French Congo"

- Hypoxestus — Loman, 1902

- Hypoxestus bituberculatus — Lawrence, 1962
- Hypoxestus coxicornis — Roewer, 1940 — Ruanda
- Hypoxestus levis — Loman, 1902
- Hypoxestus patellaris — (Sørensen, 1910) — Kilimanjaro
- Hypoxestus planus — Goodnight & Goodnight, 1959
- Hypoxestus roeweri — Starega, 1992
- Hypoxestus trituberculatus — Lawrence, 1962
- Hypoxestus ealanus — H. Kauri, 1985 — Zaire
- Hypoxestus glaber — H. Kauri, 1985 — Zaire
- Hypoxestus scaphoides — H. Kauri, 1985 — Zaire

- Leleupiolus — Roewer, 1951

- Leleupiolus marmoratus — Roewer, 1951

- Lossida — Roewer, 1935

- Lossida rugosa — Roewer, 1935

- Lossidacola — Roewer, 1935

- Lossidacola pachytarsus — Roewer, 1935

- Mabwella — Roewer, 1952

- Mabwella trochanteralis — Roewer, 1954
- Mabwella wittei — Roewer, 1952

- Mecutina — Roewer, 1935

- Mecutina filipes — Roewer, 1935 — Mozambique
- Mecutina moshinia — Roewer, 1940 — Tanzania

- Metasesostris — Roewer, 1915

- Metasesostris armatus — Roewer, 1915 — Tanzania

- Musola — Roewer, 1927

- Musola longipes — Roewer, 1927 — Bioko

- Nkogoa — Roewer, 1927

- Nkogoa feai — Roewer, 1927

- Parasesostris — Roewer, 1915

- Parasesostris granulatus — Roewer, 1915 — Tanzania

- Parazalmoxis — Roewer, 1913

- Parazalmoxis africanus — Roewer, 1913 — Kenya

- Passula — Roewer, 1927

- Passula scabricula — Roewer, 1927 — Malaysia, Pinang Islands

- Podaucheniellus — Roewer, 1927

- Podaucheniellus bipalaris — Roewer, 1927 — Cameroon

- Podauchenius — Sørensen, 1896

- Podauchenius longipes — Sørensen, 1896 — Cameroon

- Randilea — Roewer, 1935

- Randilea scabricula — Roewer, 1935

- Rhabdopygata — Roewer, 1954

- Rhabdopygata mossambica — Roewer, 1954

- Rhabdopygella — Roewer, 1935

- Rhabdopygella ferruginea — Roewer, 1935
- Rhabdopygella laevis — Roewer, 1935

- Rhabdopygus — Roewer, 1912

- Rhabdopygus benoiti — H. Kauri, 1985 — Zaire
- Rhabdopygus fuscus — Roewer, 1912
- Rhabdopygus maculatus — Roewer, 1935 — East Africa
- Rhabdopygus robustus — Lawrence, 1957
- Rhabdopygus rugipalpis — Roewer, 1952
- Rhabdopygus termitarum — Roewer, 1951

- Scabrobunus — Roewer, 1912

- Scabrobunus filipes — Roewer, 1912 — India (Maharashtra)

- Sesostranus — Roewer, 1935

- Sesostranus longipes — Roewer, 1950
- Sesostranus niger — Roewer, 1935

- Sesostrellus — Roewer, 1935

- Sesostrellus gibbosus — H. Kauri, 1985 — Zaire
- Sesostrellus robustus — Roewer, 1935
- Sesostrellus umbonatus — (Roewer, 1935) — Uganda

- Sesostris — Sørensen, 1910

- Sesostris brevipes — H. Kauri, 1985 — Burundi
- Sesostris gracilis — Sørensen, 1910 — Kilimandjaro
- Sesostris insulanus — Roewer, 1912 — Eastern Africa
- Sesostris maculatus — Roewer, 1915 — Eastern Africa
- Sesostris maculifer — H. Kauri, 1985 — Zaire

- Spinixestus — Roewer, 1952

- Spinixestus armatus — Roewer, 1952
- Spinixestus benderanus — H. Kauri, 1985 — Zaire
- Spinixestus leleupi — H. Kauri, 1985 — Zaire
- Spinixestus polycuspidatus — H. Kauri, 1985 — Zaire
- Spinixestus rufus — Roewer, 1952
- Spinixestus siteteus — Roewer, 1961

- Talaspus — Roewer, 1935

- Talaspus spinimanus — Roewer, 1935

- Tusipulla — Roewer, 1935

- Tusipulla coxalis — Roewer, 1935 — Tanzania

- Viglua — Roewer, 1940

- Viglua brunnipes — Roewer, 1940
- Viglua machadoi — Lawrence, 1949

- Viglua machadoi machadoi — Lawrence, 1949
- Viglua machadoi granulosa — Lawrence, 1957
- Viglua machadoi majora — Lawrence, 1949

== Irumuinae ==
Irumuinae — Kauri, 1985

- Irumua — Roewer, 1961

- Irumua caeca — Roewer, 1961 — Zaire
- Irumua bifurcata — [Kauri 1989 ref]

- Machadoessa — Lawrence, 1951

- Machadoessa inops — Lawrence, 1951 — Angola

- Mutadia — Kauri, 1985

- Mutadia bifurcata — H. Kauri, 1985 — Zaire

- Numipedia — Kauri, 1985

- Numipedia subterranea — H. Kauri, 1985 — Zaire

- Typhlobunus — Roewer, 1915

- Typhlobunus troglodytes — Roewer, 1915 — Kenya

== Maruinae ==
Maruinae — Roewer, 1935

- Abanatus — Roewer, 1950

- Abanatus beloti — Roewer, 1950 — Zaire

- Celimba — Roewer, 1940

- Celimba parvula — Roewer, 1940 — Tanzania

- Congonia — Roewer, 1935

- Congonia spinifrons — Roewer, 1935 — Zaire

- Katangania — H. Kauri, 1985

- Katangania monticola — H. Kauri, 1985 — Zaire

- Kituvia — Kauri, 1985

- Kituvia spinifera — H. Kauri, 1985 — Zaire

- Marua — Roewer, 1935

- Marua schenkeli — Roewer, 1935 — Zaire
- Marua spinosa — Roewer, 1935 — Cameroon

- Mwenga — Kauri, 1985

- Mwenga setosa — H. Kauri, 1985 — Zaire

== Polycoryphinae ==
Polycoryphinae — Roewer, 1935

- Anaimalus — Roewer, 1929

- Anaimalus gibbulus — Roewer, 1929 — India (Anaimalai Hills)

- Binderella — Roewer, 1935

- Binderella bistriata — Roewer, 1935 (including synonym of Tengelinia paradoxa Roewer, 1935 which is listed in some online sources as Binderella paradoxa) — Chad, Cameroon

- Bueana — Roewer, 1927

- Bueana ephippiata — Roewer, 1927 — Cameroon

- Gulufia — Roewer, 1935

- Gulufia frontalis — Roewer, 1935 — Ethiopia

- Harpenna — Roewer, 1935 (note, misspelling 'Harpeuna' by Hallan catalog)

- Harpenna denticulata — Roewer, 1935 — India (Bombay)

- Henriquea — Roewer, 1927

- Henriquea spinigera — Roewer, 1927 — Principe

- Karalaica — Roewer, 1927

- Karalaica atroscutata — Roewer, 1927 — India (Kerala)

- Kodaika — Roewer, 1929

- Kodaika escheri — Roewer, 1929 — India (Upper Palnis)

- Koyna — Roewer, 1915

- Koyna spinulata — Roewer, 1915 — India

- Maracandellus — Roewer, 1923

- Maracandellus rhinoceros — (Thorell, 1889) — Burma
- Maracandellus bidentatus — S. Suzuki, 1985 — Thailand

- Maracandinus — Roewer, 1912

- Maracandinus rubrofemoratus — (Pavesi, 1895) — Ethiopia

- Maracandus — Simon, 1879

- Maracandus macei — Simon, 1879 — Bangladesh
- Maracandus monhoti — Simon, 1879 — Cambodia

- Mormuga — Roewer, 1927

- Mormuga uncifrons — Roewer, 1927 — India (Mormugao Bay)

- Mudumalus — Roewer, 1929

- Mudumalus partialis — Roewer, 1929 — India (Nilgiris)

- Oppalnia — Roewer, 1927

- Oppalnia brevipes — Roewer, 1927 — India (Nilgiri Palni)

- Paktongius — Suzuki, 1969

- Paktongius distinctus — Suzuki, 1969 — Thailand

- Palmanella — Roewer, 1927

- Palmanella tigrina — Roewer, 1927

- Panchganius — Roewer, 1935

- Panchganius blatteri — Roewer, 1935 — India (Satara)

- Parakodaika — Goodnight & Goodnight, 1944

- Parakodaika angolae — Goodnight & Goodnight, 1944 — Angola

- Paramaracandus — Suzuki, 1976

- Paramaracandus fuscus — Suzuki, 1976
- Paramaracandus sexdentatus — S. Suzuki, 1985 — Thailand

- Pashokia — Roewer, 1927

- Pashokia laeviscutum — Roewer, 1927 — eastern Himalaya
- Pashokia maxima — Martens, 1977
- Pashokia mutatrix — Martens, 1977
- Pashokia rufa — Roewer, 1935 — Burma
- Pashokia silhavyi — Martens, 1977
- Pashokia yamadai — Suzuki, 1970

- Phalcochina — Roewer, 1927

- Phalcochina albistriata — Roewer, 1927 — India (Kerala)

- Polycoryphus — Loman, 1902

- Polycoryphus asper — Loman, 1902 — Namibia, South Africa

- Procoryphus — Roewer, 1950

- Procoryphus multispinatus — Roewer, 1950
- Procoryphus straeleni — Roewer, 1952

- Pulchrandus — H. Kauri, 1985

- Pulchrandus longimanus — H. Kauri, 1985 — Zaire

- Pykara — Roewer, 1929

- Pykara coxalis — Roewer, 1929

- Santhomea — Roewer, 1927

- Santhomea scabra — Roewer, 1927

- Senarba — Roewer, 1927

- Senarba rudicoxa — Roewer, 1927
- Senarba acanthicoxa — Roewer, 1927

- Sonega — Roewer, 1935

- Sonega scutata — Roewer, 1935

- Thomecola — Roewer, 1935

- Thomecola quadrispina — (Roewer, 1927)

- Uviranus — Kauri, 1985

- Uviranus echinops — H. Kauri, 1985 — Zaire

- Yadoa — Roewer, 1936

- Yadoa feae — Roewer, 1936

- Zirolana — Roewer, 1940

- Zirolana lutea — Roewer, 1940

== Selencinae ==
Selencinae — Roewer, 1935

- Cassifluminia — Kury, 2017

- Cassifluminia macrochelis — (Roewer, 1927)

- Euselenca — Roewer, 1923

- Euselenca feai — Roewer, 1927 — Fr.Congo
- Euselenca gracilis — (Sørensen, 1896) — Cameroon

- Humbea — Roewer, 1935

- Humbea bimaculata — Roewer, 1935

- Jaundea — Roewer, 1935

- Jaundea spinulata — (Roewer, 1912) — Cameroon

- Metaselenca — Roewer, 1912

- Metaselenca halbum — (Loman, 1910) — Cameroon

- Paraselenca — Roewer, 1923

- Paraselenca aculeata — (Roewer, 1912) — Togo, Cameroon
- Paraselenca hispida — (Roewer, 1912) — Togo, Cameroon
- Paraselenca marginata — Roewer, 1935 — Cameroon
- Paraselenca simonis — Sørensen, 1932 — West Africa

- Sassandria — Roewer, 1912

- Sassandria bicolor — Roewer, 1912 — Ivory Coast
- Sassandria tenuipes — Lawrence, 1965

- Selenca — Sørensen, 1896

- Selenca maculata — Sørensen, 1896 — Cameroon, Togo

- Selencasta — Roewer, 1935

- Selencasta minuscula — (Roewer, 1927) — Bioko

- Selencula — Roewer, 1935

- Selencula filipes — (Roewer, 1927) — Bioko

- Seuthesplus — Roewer, 1935

- Seuthesplus nigeriensis — Roewer, 1935 — Nigeria
- Seuthesplus perarmatus — Lawrence, 1965

- Seuthessus — Kauri, 1985

- Seuthessus pustulatus — H. Kauri, 1985 — Zaire

- Umbonimba — Roewer, 1953

- Umbonimba acanthops — Roewer, 1953

== Sidaminae ==
Sidaminae — Roewer, 1935

- Amhara — Pavesi, 1897

- Amhara grata — Pavesi, 1897 — Somali
- Amhara nigrescens — (Roewer, 1935) — Ethiopia

- Blantyrea — Roewer, 1912

- Blantyrea armata — Roewer, 1912 — Malawi

- Bundelkhandia — Turk, 1945

- Bundelkhandia cavernicola — Turk, 1945

- Congolla — Roewer, 1935

- Congolla hispidipalpus — Roewer, 1935

- Edeala — Roewer, 1927

- Edeala palpiplus — Roewer, 1927

- Eusidama — Roewer, 1913

- Eusidama minima — Roewer, 1913 — Kilimandjaro, Tanzania

- Fizibius — Roewer, 1961

- Fizibius proprius — Roewer, 1961

- Indosidama — Turk, 1945

- Indosidama moila — Turk, 1945 — cave

- Lisposidama — Lawrence, 1962

- Lisposidama filipes — Lawrence, 1962

- Lukundamila — Roewer, 1961

- Lukundamila cookei — Roewer, 1961

- Metasidama — Roewer, 1915

- Metasidama ephippiata — Roewer, 1915 — Tanzania
- Metasidama gracilis — Lawrence, 1962

- Neosidama — Roewer, 1915

- Neosidama longipes — Roewer, 1915 — Tanzania

- Orsimonia — Roewer, 1935

- Orsimonia filipes — Roewer, 1935
- Orsimonia gracillimus — (Roewer, 1935)

- Scabrosidama — Lawrence, 1962

- Scabrosidama serratichelis — Lawrence, 1962

- Sidama — Pavesi, 1895

- Sidama moesta — Pavesi, 1895 — East Africa
- Sidama abessinica — Roewer, 1912 — Ethiopia
- Sidama spinger — (Roewer, 1935) — Ethiopia

- Vilhena — Lawrence, 1949

- Vilhena delicata — Lawrence, 1949
