= Dongmolla =

Scientific classification
- Kingdom: Animalia
- Phylum: Arthropoda
- Subphylum: Chelicerata
- Class: Arachnida
- Order: Opiliones
- Family: Assamiidae
- Subfamily: Dampetrinae
- Genus: Dongmolla; Roewer, 1927
- Species: D. silvestrii

Binomial name
- Dongmolla silvestrii Roewer, 1927

Genus of harvestmen/daddy longlegs

Dongmolla is a harvestman genus in the family Assamiidae, with only 1 described species - Dongmolla silvestrii.

== See also ==
- List of Assamiidae species
