= Cereatta =

Scientific classification
- Kingdom: Animalia
- Phylum: Arthropoda
- Subphylum: Chelicerata
- Class: Arachnida
- Order: Opiliones
- Family: Assamiidae
- Subfamily: Erecinae
- Genus: Cereatta; Roewer, 1935

Species
- See text

Genus of harvestmen

Cereatta is a harvestman genus in the family Assamiidae.

== Species ==
- Cereatta celeripes (Loman, 1910) - Cameroon
- Cereatta elegans Roewer, 1935 - Cameroon
- Cereatta kivuensis Roewer, 1961

== See also ==
- List of Assamiidae species
