= Branchinella ornata =

Scientific classification
- Domain: Eukaryota
- Kingdom: Animalia
- Phylum: Arthropoda
- Class: Branchiopoda
- Order: Anostraca
- Family: Thamnocephalidae
- Genus: Branchinella
- Species: B. ornata

Binomial name
- Branchinella ornata Daday, 1910

Species of small freshwater animal

Branchinella ornata is a species within the family Thamnocephalidae. This fairy shrimp species is found in parts of Southern Africa, notably the Sua and Nwetwe Pans of the Makgadikgadi Pans in Botswana.
