= Branchinella basispina =

Conservation status
- Vulnerable (IUCN 2.3)

Scientific classification
- Kingdom: Animalia
- Phylum: Arthropoda
- Class: Branchiopoda
- Order: Anostraca
- Family: Thamnocephalidae
- Genus: Branchinella
- Species: B. basispina

Binomial name
- Branchinella basispina Geddes, 1981

Species of small freshwater animal

Branchinella basispina is a species of crustacean in the family Thamnocephalidae. It is endemic to Australia.
