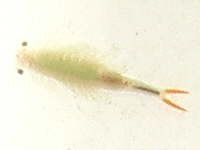
- Branchinella sp. from a rice paddy in Hyōgo Prefecture, Japan

Scientific classification
- Kingdom: Animalia
- Phylum: Arthropoda
- Clade: Pancrustacea
- Class: Branchiopoda
- Order: Anostraca
- Family: Thamnocephalidae
- Genus: Branchinella; Sayce, 1903

Type species
- Branchipus australiensis Richters, 1976

= Branchinella =

Genus of small freshwater animals

Branchinella is a genus of crustaceans in the family Thamnocephalidae. This fairy shrimp genus is found across many parts of the world, but especially western Australia and southern Africa.

Several species have small ranges and are threatened by habitat destruction. For example, B. latzi is only known from south Northern Territory and southwest Queensland, but it has been extirpated from the Uluru region due to pollution from urine and faeces of tourists.

The species Branchinella kugenumaensis are known as "Honen shrimp" (ホウネンエビ) in Japan, and are commonly found in rice fields during the early summer.

== Selected species ==
Branchinella includes the following species:

- Branchinella acacioidea Belk & Sissom, 1992
- Branchinella affinis Linder, 1941
- Branchinella alachua Dexter, 1953
- Branchinella apophysata Linder, 1941
- Branchinella arborea Geddes, 1981
- Branchinella australiensis (Richters, 1876)
- Branchinella basispina Geddes, 1981
- Branchinella buchananensis Geddes, 1981
- Branchinella chudeaui (Daday, 1910)
- Branchinella compacta Linder, 1941
- Branchinella complexidigitata Timms, 2003
- Branchinella denticulata Linder, 1941
- Branchinella dubia (Schwartz, 1917)
- Branchinella frondosa Henry, 1924
- Branchinella halsei Timms, 2003
- Branchinella hardingi (Qadri & Baqai, 1956)
- Branchinella hattahensis Geddes, 1981
- Branchinella kadjikadji Timms, 2003
- Branchinella kugenumaensis (Ishikawa, 1895)
- Branchinella latzi Geddes, 1981
- Branchinella lithaca (Creaser, 1940)
- Branchinella longirostris Wolf, 1911
- Branchinella lyrifera Linder, 1941
- Branchinella madurai Raj, 1951
- Branchinella mcraeae Timms, 2005
- Branchinella minuta Rœn, 1952
- Branchinella multidigitata Timms, 2008
- Branchinella nana Timms, 2003
- Branchinella nichollsi Linder, 1941
- Branchinella occidentalis Dakin, 1914
- Branchinella ondonguae (Barnard, 1924)
- Branchinella ornata Daday, 1910
- Branchinella papillata Timms, 2008
- Branchinella pinderi Timms, 2008
- Branchinella pinnata Geddes, 1981
- Branchinella proboscida Henry, 1924
- Branchinella simplex Linder, 1941
- Branchinella spinosa (Milne-Edwards, 1840)
- Branchinella sublettei Sissom, 1976
- Branchinella thailandensis Sanoamuang, Saengphan & Murugan, 2002
- Branchinella vosperi Timms, 2008
- Branchinella wellardi Milner, 1929

Some related fairy shrimp, such as Phallocryptus wrighti, were formerly placed in Branchinella.
