= Phallocryptus fahimii =

Scientific classification
- Kingdom: Animalia
- Phylum: Arthropoda
- Class: Branchiopoda
- Order: Anostraca
- Family: Thamnocephalidae
- Genus: Phallocryptus
- Species: P. fahimii

Binomial name
- Phallocryptus fahimii Schwentner, Rodov & Rajaei, 2020

Species of fresh water crustacean

Phallocryptus fahimii, is a fresh water anostracan crustacean discovered in 2017 from a seasonal lake in the Lut Desert in southeast Iran. This heat-resistant fairy shrimp lives in a lake with water temperatures reaching 87 °F (31 °C). It is the fifth described species in the genus Phallocryptus. The specific epithet commemorates the late Hadi Fahimii, a conservationist who took part in the expedition of the Lut Desert and died in 2018 from an airplane crash. Morphologically, this newly discovered species shows minimal differences from its relatives in the Phallocryptus genus. A distinguishing characteristic of this fairy shrimp is that it can lay its eggs in desert sand for decades while they await the rare presence of water. P. fahimii developed these unique characteristics due to its harsh environmental conditions throughout the Lut Desert, which in Persian, translates into “desert of emptiness.” Dr.Hossein Rajaei, one of the researchers that made the shrimp discovery, suggested, “they gave it this name because many people believed there was no life in this desert.”

== Description ==
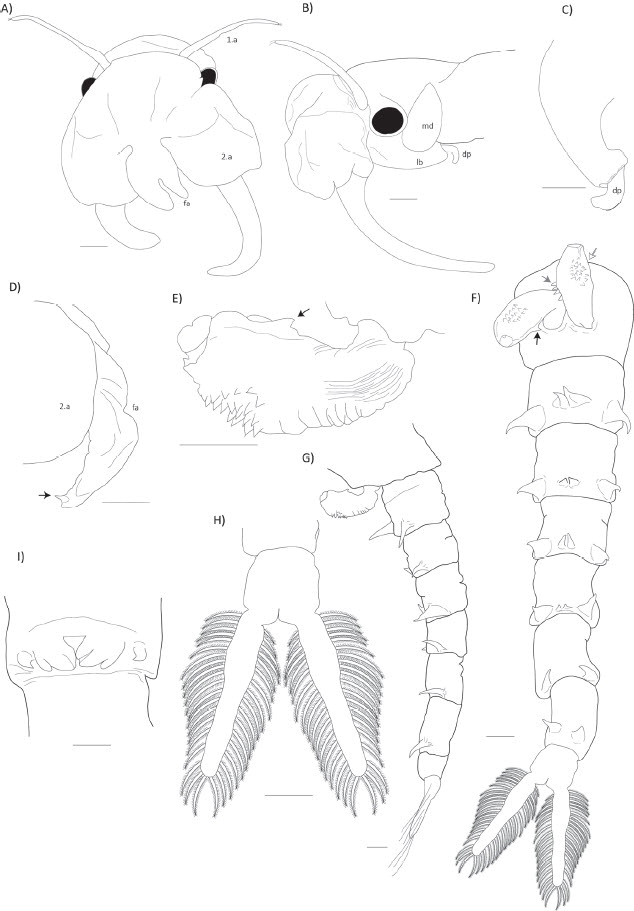
Anatomical structures of P. fahimii (male)

=== Size ===
The female shrimp is around 3 cm (1.2 in) long and the male shrimp is around 2.25 cm (0.89 in) long.

=== Morphology ===
Phallocryptus fahimii is most closely related to the Mongolian P. tserensodnomi. Males can be differentiated based on the relatively long frontal organ, the strong curvature of the labral distal process and the usual lack of a ventrolateral spine of the genital segment. The morphological differences between the new shrimp and the Mongolian fairy shrimp, P. tserensodnomi, were slight: a longer frontal organ, and curvier antennae. For about 1–2 months, the fairy shrimp swim upside down around their lakes, laying eggs before they die or the pool dries up. Eggs can last decades, even when the lakes have been completely dried up. When water begins to come back due to rainfall, the eggs drink the water and begin to hatch.

== Distribution ==
Phallocryptus fahimii was discovered within an evaporating lake in the hottest desert in the world. The Phallocryptus genus has been known to consist of highly restrictive geographic distributions. One reason why its distributions are highly restrictive is because they rely on seasonal pond formation. Although P. fahimii hasn't been discovered anywhere else, its Phallocryptus relatives have been found in other environments such as P. tserensodnomi being found in Mongolia and P. spinosa being found elsewhere in Iran.

== Habitat and ecology ==
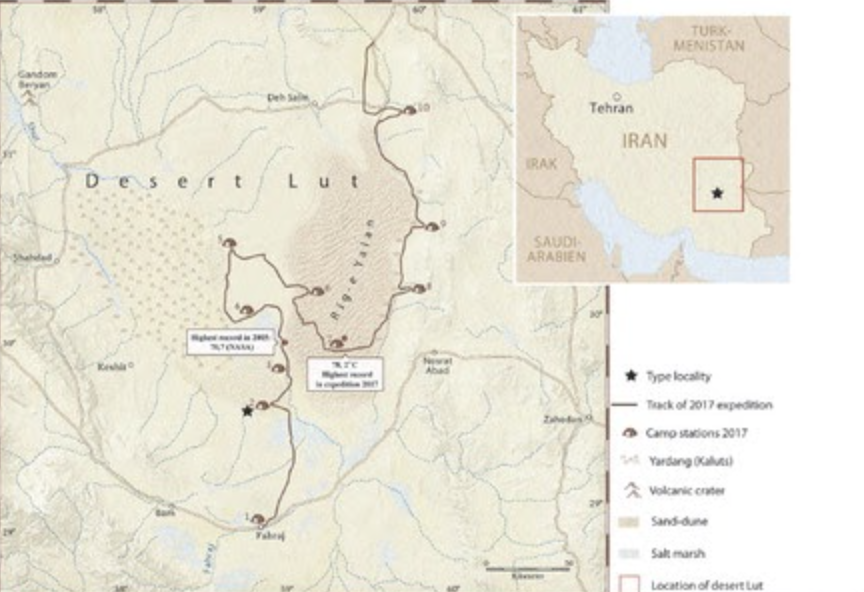
Precise location where P. fahimii was discovered

Phallocryptus fahimii is located in the Lut Desert, known as the “thermal pole of the Earth” where temperatures reach up to 78.2 °C (172.8 °F). Located between 33° and 28° parallels, this desert holds the current record for the highest ever-recorded surface temperature. The Lut desert is the second largest desert in Iran, at around 51,800 km^{2} (20,000 sq mi). It harbors diverse animal and archaeal life, but no permanent aquatic biotopes, such as ponds. The ephemeral pools are filled by seasonal floods which are derived from spring precipitation. Ephemeral pools are basins that remain flooded periodically throughout the year, but won't hold water if rainfall is insufficient. Temperatures can range from 122 °F (50 °C) during the day to 35 °F (2 °C) at night. Sabrina Imbler in The New York Times, September 21, 2020, described the living environment for this species when she wrote, “For a month or two, the fairy shrimp frolic, swimming upside-down in their ephemeral lakes and laying their eggs before they die or the pool dries up, whichever comes first.”
