= Branchinella alachua =

Conservation status
- Endangered (IUCN 2.3)

Scientific classification
- Kingdom: Animalia
- Phylum: Arthropoda
- Clade: Pancrustacea
- Class: Branchiopoda
- Order: Anostraca
- Family: Thamnocephalidae
- Genus: Branchinella
- Species: B. alachua

Binomial name
- Branchinella alachua Dexter, 1953

Species of small freshwater animal

Branchinella alachua is a species of crustacean in the family Thamnocephalidae. It was described in 1953 by Ralph W. Dexter based on material collected in 1947 by I. J. Cantrall; 11 male individuals of the new species were discovered among Cantrall's collection of Streptocephalus seali. B. alachua is only known from the type locality, a temporary pool in Alachua County, Florida, from which its specific epithet derives. It is listed as an endangered species on the IUCN Red List.
