= Branchinella lithaca =

Conservation status
- Critically Endangered (IUCN 2.3)

Scientific classification
- Kingdom: Animalia
- Phylum: Arthropoda
- Class: Branchiopoda
- Order: Anostraca
- Family: Thamnocephalidae
- Genus: Branchinella
- Species: B. lithaca

Binomial name
- Branchinella lithaca (Creaser, 1940)

Species of small freshwater animal

Branchinella lithaca, the Stone Mountain fairy shrimp, is a species of crustacean in the family Thamnocephalidae. It was collected on Stone Mountain, DeKalb County, Georgia in 1940, and has not been seen since. It is listed as Critically Endangered on the IUCN Red List.
