= Cereatta elegans =

Scientific classification
- Kingdom: Animalia
- Phylum: Arthropoda
- Subphylum: Chelicerata
- Class: Arachnida
- Order: Opiliones
- Family: Assamiidae
- Genus: Cereatta
- Species: C. elegans

Binomial name
- Cereatta elegans Roewer, 1935

Species of harvestman/daddy longlegs

Cereatta elegans is a harvestman species in the genus Cereatta found in Cameroon.

== See also ==
- List of Assamiidae species
