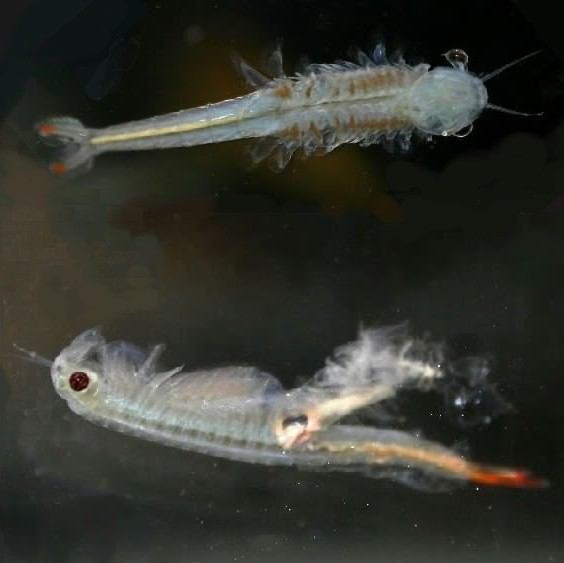
- Dendrocephalus geayi

Scientific classification
- Kingdom: Animalia
- Phylum: Arthropoda
- Class: Branchiopoda
- Order: Anostraca
- Family: Thamnocephalidae
- Genus: Dendrocephalus; Daday, 1908

Subgenera
- Dendrocephalus Daday, 1908; Dendrocephalinus Rogers, 2006

= Dendrocephalus =

Genus of small freshwater animals

Dendrocephalus is a genus of fairy shrimp found in South and North America. It is characterised by the presence of an antenna-like appendage arising between the second antennae and the eyestalks. The genus comprises 17 species in two subgenera:

Dendrocephalus Daday, 1908

- Dendrocephalus affinis Pereira, 1984 – Venezuela
- Dendrocephalus argentinus Pereira & Belk, 1987 – Paraguay
- Dendrocephalus brasiliensis Pesta, 1921 – Argentina, Brazil
- Dendrocephalus cervicornis (Weltner, 1890) – Argentina
- Dendrocephalus conosurius Pereira & Ruiz, 1995
- Dendrocephalus cornutus Pereira & Belk, 1987 – Costa Rica
- Dendrocephalus geayi Daday, 1908 – Venezuela
- Dendrocephalus goiasensis Rabet & Thiéry, 1996 – Brazil
- Dendrocephalus orientalis Rabet & Thiéry, 1996 – Brazil
- Dendrocephalus sarmentosus Pereira & Belk, 1987 – Galápagos Islands
- Dendrocephalus spartaenovae Margalef, 1967 – Venezuela
- Dendrocephalus thieryi Rabet, 2006 – Brazil
- Dendrocephalus venezolanus Pereira, 1984 – Venezuela

Dendrocephalinus Rogers, 2006

- Dendrocephalus acacioidea (Belk & Sissom, 1992) – United States
- Dendrocephalus alachua (Dexter, 1953) – United States
- Dendrocephalus lithaca Creaser, 1940 – United States
- Dendrocephalus proeliator Rogers, Dunn and Price, 2019 - United States
