= Euwintonius =

Scientific classification
- Kingdom: Animalia
- Phylum: Arthropoda
- Subphylum: Chelicerata
- Class: Arachnida
- Order: Opiliones
- Family: Nemastomatidae
- Subfamily: Nemastomatinae
- Genus: Euwintonius; Roewer, 1923

Species
- Euwintonius bismarckensis Ponting, 2015; Euwintonius continentalis Roewer, 1923; Euwintonius insulanus Roewer, 1940; Euwintonius thaiensis Suzuki, 1985

Genus of harvestmen/daddy longlegs

Euwintonius is a harvestman genus in the family Assamiidae, subfamily Dampetrinae. Members of this genus have an unarmoured eye pedicel, scutal areas 1-5 and the first three tergites also being unarmoured. The first scutal area is without a longitudinal groove and the palpal femur has one medial-apical spine.

== Etymology ==
This genus is named after the town of Winton in central west Queensland, Australia, where the first specimen was found. The type species is Euwintonius continentalis.

== List of species ==
Four species are currently accepted as being members of this genus

- Euwintonius bismarckensis Ponting, 2015 from the Bismarck Archipelago
- Euwintonius continentalis Roewer, 1923 from Australia
- Euwintonius insulanus Roewer, 1940 from New Guinea
- Euwintonius thaiensis Suzuki, 1985 from Thailand
