= Sassandria =

Scientific classification
- Domain: Eukaryota
- Kingdom: Animalia
- Phylum: Arthropoda
- Subphylum: Chelicerata
- Class: Arachnida
- Order: Opiliones
- Family: Assamiidae
- Subfamily: Selencinae
- Genus: Sassandria; Roewer, 1912

Synonyms
- Aburitus Roewer, 1935; Assiniana Roewer, 1915

Genus of arachnids

Sassandria is a genus of harvestmen belonging to the family Assamiidae.

Species:

- Sassandria bicolor Roewer, 1912
- Sassandria tenuipes Lawrence, 1965
