= Phallocryptus =

Scientific classification
- Domain: Eukaryota
- Kingdom: Animalia
- Phylum: Arthropoda
- Class: Branchiopoda
- Order: Anostraca
- Family: Thamnocephalidae
- Genus: Phallocryptus; Birabén, 1951

Species
- Phallocryptus fahimii; Phallocryptus spinosus; Phallocryptus sublettei; Phallocryptus tserensodnomi; Phallocryptus wrighti

Genus of crustaceans

Phallocryptus is a genus of crustaceans within the family Thamnocephalidae.
