= Cassifluminia =

Scientific classification
- Kingdom: Animalia
- Phylum: Arthropoda
- Subphylum: Chelicerata
- Class: Arachnida
- Order: Opiliones
- Family: Assamiidae
- Subfamily: Selencinae
- Genus: Cassifluminia; Kury, 2017
- Species: C. macrochelis

Binomial name
- Cassifluminia macrochelis (Roewer, 1927)

Synonyms
- Genus : Cassinia Roewer, 1927 Species : Cassinia macrochelis Roewer, 1927

Genus of arachnids

Cassifluminia macrochelis is a species of harvestman known from Guinea-Bissau. It is the only species in the genus Cassifluminia. The genus was originally described under the name Cassinia, which turned out to be preoccupied.
