= Branchinella denticulata =

Conservation status
- Vulnerable (IUCN 2.3)

Scientific classification
- Kingdom: Animalia
- Phylum: Arthropoda
- Class: Branchiopoda
- Order: Anostraca
- Family: Thamnocephalidae
- Genus: Branchinella
- Species: B. denticulata

Binomial name
- Branchinella denticulata Linder, 1941

Species of small freshwater animal

Branchinella denticulata is a species of crustacean in the family Thamnocephalidae. It is endemic to Australia.
