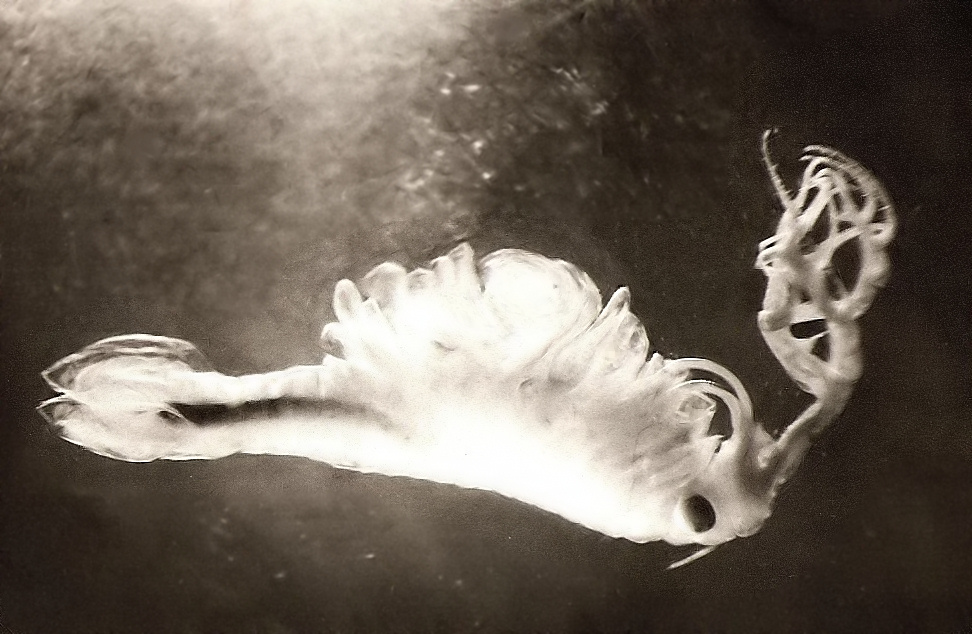
- Thamnocephalus venezuelensis

Scientific classification
- Domain: Eukaryota
- Kingdom: Animalia
- Phylum: Arthropoda
- Class: Branchiopoda
- Order: Anostraca
- Family: Thamnocephalidae
- Genus: Thamnocephalus; Packard, 1877

= Thamnocephalus =

Genus of crustaceans

Thamnocephalus is a genus of fairy shrimp within the family Thamnocephalidae. There are currently 5 species assigned to the genus, along with 2 subgenera.

== Species ==
=== Subgenus Simplicephalus ===
- Thamnocephalus salinarum Cohen, 2002

=== Subgenus Thamnocephalus ===
- Thamnocephalus chacosaltensis Cohen, 2016
- Thamnocephalus mexicanus Linder, 1941
- Thamnocephalus platyurus Packard, 1877
- Thamnocephalus venezuelensis Belk & Pereira, 1982
