= Phallocryptus spinosus =

Scientific classification
- Kingdom: Animalia
- Phylum: Arthropoda
- Clade: Pancrustacea
- Class: Branchiopoda
- Order: Anostraca
- Family: Thamnocephalidae
- Genus: Phallocryptus
- Species: P. spinosus

Binomial name
- Phallocryptus spinosus (H.Milne-Edwards, 1840)

Synonyms
- Branchinella spinosa

Species of crustacean

Phallocryptus spinosus, the halophilic fairy shrimp, is a species of fairy shrimp within the family Thamnocephalidae. The species of previously recorded from a shallow salty pond in Tabriz, occurring in the same area as Branchinecta orientalis. More locations were reported in similar habitats in central and south Iran from Bafq and Lar, and a 4th population was found 200 kilometers south to the original locality. It occurs in parts of Southern Africa, notably the Makgadikgadi Pans of Botswana. Other crustacean species found in this region of Botswana in co-existence with B. spinosa include Moina belli.
