= Bossiaea spinosa =

Conservation status
- Priority Three — Poorly Known Taxa (DEC)

Scientific classification
- Kingdom: Plantae
- Clade: Tracheophytes
- Clade: Angiosperms
- Clade: Eudicots
- Clade: Rosids
- Order: Fabales
- Family: Fabaceae
- Subfamily: Faboideae
- Genus: Bossiaea
- Species: B. spinosa

Binomial name
- Bossiaea spinosa (Turcz.) Domin
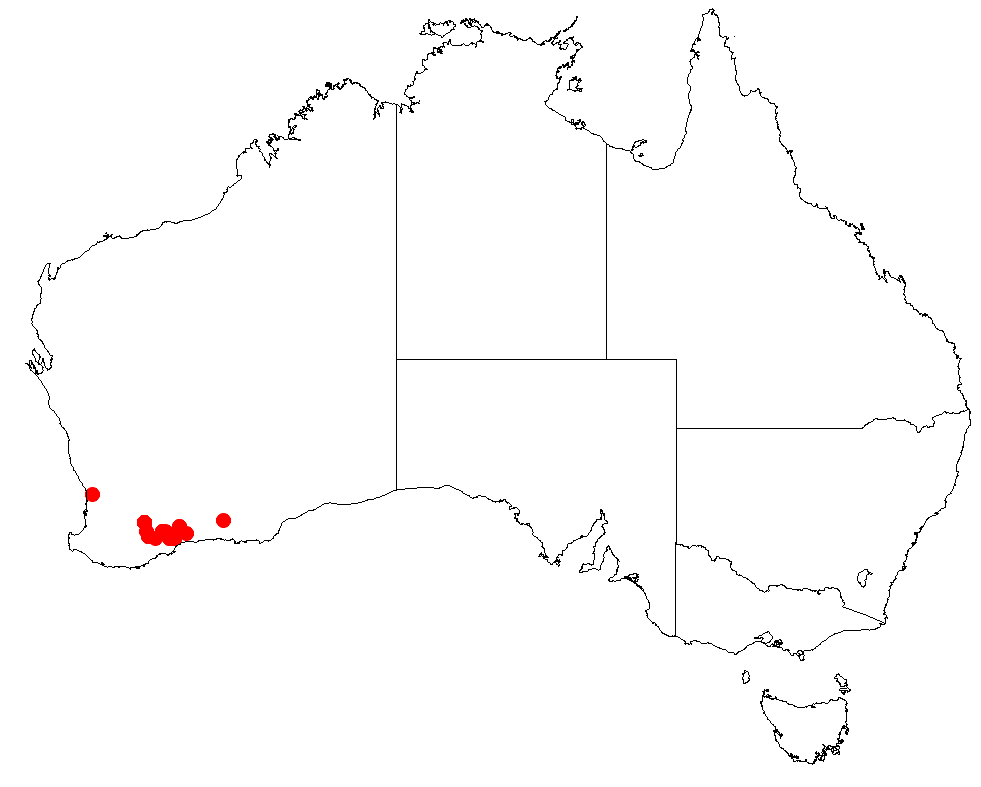
- Occurrence data from AVH

Synonyms
- Platylobium spinosum Turcz.; Bossiaea calycina Benth. nom. illeg.

Species of legume

Bossiaea spinosa is a species of flowering plant in the family Fabaceae and is endemic to the south-west of Western Australia. It is a low, dense prostrate or rounded, twiggy shrub with egg-shaped to elliptic leaves and deep yellow to orange and pinkish-red, pea-like flowers.

== Description ==
Bossiaea spinosa is a dense, prostrate or rounded, twiggy shrub that typically grows to a height of 15–50 cm (5.9–19.7 in) with its young branches whitish and side branches often ending with a sharp point. The leaves are egg-shaped or elliptic, 2.3–6.0 mm (0.091–0.236 in) long and 1.5–3.0 mm (0.059–0.118 in) wide on a petiole 0.5–2.0 mm (0.020–0.079 in) long with narrow egg-shaped stipules 1.2–2.6 mm (0.047–0.102 in) long at the base. The flowers are arranged singly, each flower on a pedicel up to 3.5 mm (0.14 in) long, with egg-shaped or elliptic bracts 1.5–2.9 mm (0.059–0.114 in) long at the base. There are egg-shaped bracteoles 1.8–3.5 mm (0.071–0.138 in) long on the pedicels. The five sepals are green with a pink to purplish tinge and joined at the base, forming a tube 1.6–3.0 mm (0.063–0.118 in) long, the two upper lobes 7.0–9.5 mm (0.28–0.37 in) long and the lower lobes 5.0–6.5 mm (0.20–0.26 in) long. The standard petal is deep yellow to orange with a pinkish-red and yellow base, 8.7–10.2 mm (0.34–0.40 in) long and 10.3–12.5 mm (0.41–0.49 in) wide, the wings are 7.5–9.0 mm (0.30–0.35 in) long, and the keel dark red and 7.4–8.8 mm (0.29–0.35 in) long. Flowering occurs from August to October and the fruit is a flattened pod 8–16 mm (0.31–0.63 in) long.

== Taxonomy and naming ==
This species was first formally described in 1853 by Nikolai Turczaninow who gave it the name Platylobium spinosum in the Bulletin de la Société impériale des naturalistes de Moscou from specimens collected by James Drummond. In 1923, Karel Domin changed the name to Bossiaea spinosa. The specific epithet (spinosa) means "spiny".

== Distribution and habitat ==
This species of pea grows in mallee and heathland between Lake Grace, Ongerup and Ravensthorpe in the Avon Wheatbelt, Esperance Plains and Mallee biogeographic regions of south-western Western Australia.

== Conservation status ==
Bossiaea spinosa is classified as "Priority Three" by the Government of Western Australia Department of Biodiversity, Conservation and Attractions, meaning that it is poorly known and known from only a few locations but is not under imminent threat.
