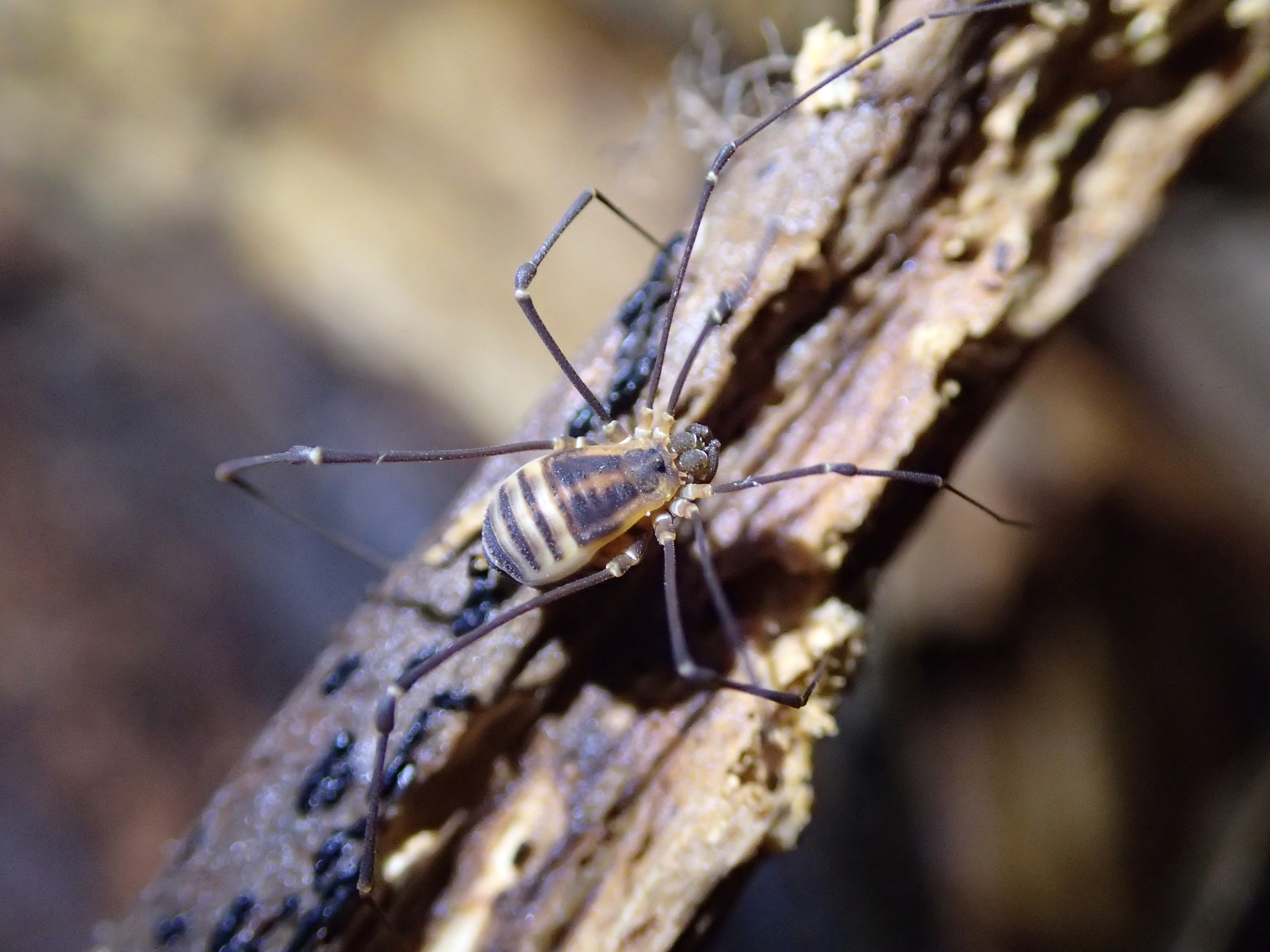
- Bandona boninensis

Scientific classification
- Kingdom: Animalia
- Phylum: Arthropoda
- Subphylum: Chelicerata
- Class: Arachnida
- Order: Opiliones
- Suborder: Laniatores
- Infraorder: Grassatores
- Superfamily: Assamioidea
- Family: Assamiidae; Sørensen, 1884

Subfamilies
- See text

Diversity
- c. 250 genera, > 440 species

= Assamiidae =

Family of harvestmen/daddy longlegs

Assamiidae are a family of harvestmen with more than 400 described species. It is the third most diverse family of the suborder Laniatores.

== Name ==
The family name is derived from the Indian province Assam, where the type species of the type genus (Assamia westermanni) was collected.

== Description ==
These harvestmen range in body length from two to eight millimeters. The length of their legs ranges from four to forty millimeters, though they are usually long. Assamiidae are usually reddish brown to yellow with black mottling and reticulation. Some species have white drawings on the dorsal scutum.

== Distribution ==
Assamiidae only occur in the Old World, and are completely absent from Madagascar and Europe, with most species found in Africa and southern Asia. Although they are also not found on the Pacific islands, the subfamily Dampetrinae has radiated in Australia, New Guinea, and somewhat in Indonesia.

== Subtaxa ==
A list of included species is here

Although Roewer established numerous subfamilies for this group, most of these are unsupported. There are at least five great groups, whose boundaries do not coincide with these subfamilies.

The Dampetrinae are endemic to Australia and New Guinea.
The Assamiinae occur mostly in India and Nepal.
The Trionyxellinae have a pseudonychium (a median tarsal claw on the third and fourth leg tarsi) and are found in India and Sri Lanka.
The Erecinae live in central Africa.
The small, blind Irumuinae dwell in caves and soil.

For a list of currently described species with the traditional groupings into subfamilies, see the List of Assamiidae species.

== Relationships ==
The Assamidae are possibly the sister group to the Gonyleptoidea. The spiny funnel on the penis is very similar to those of Stygnopsidae from Mexico. Mello-Leitão erected the Trionyxellidae for four subfamilies of Assamiidae in 1949, but this was ignored by later authors.
