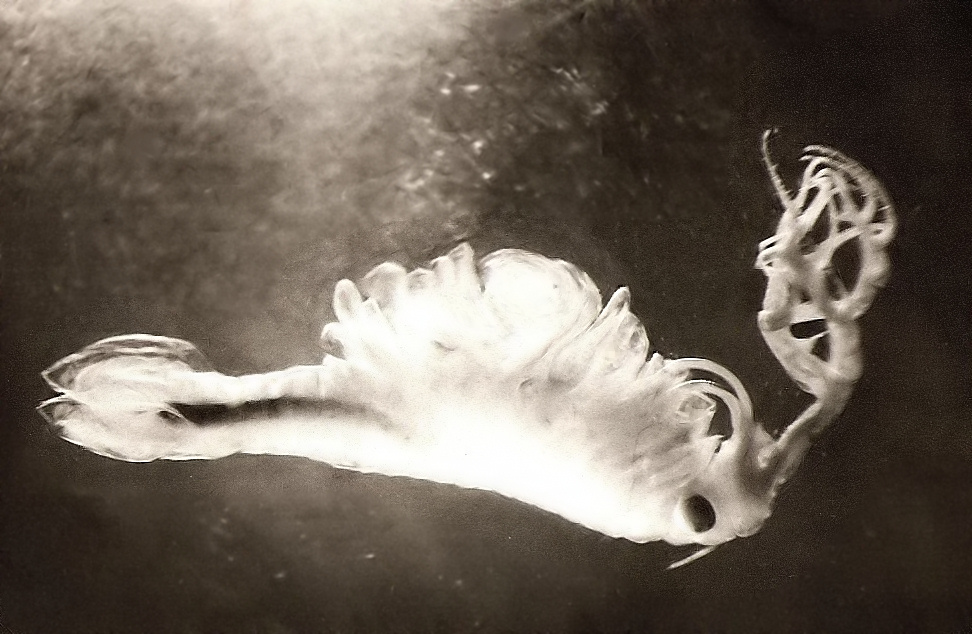
- Male Thamnocephalus venezuelensis

Scientific classification
- Kingdom: Animalia
- Phylum: Arthropoda
- Clade: Pancrustacea
- Class: Branchiopoda
- Order: Anostraca
- Suborder: Anostracina
- Family: Thamnocephalidae; Packard, 1883

= Thamnocephalidae =

Family of fairy shrimps

Thamnocephalidae is a family of anostracan branchiopod crustaceans with wide distribution including Western Australia, Southern Africa and South America. It was originally described as a subfamily of Branchipodidae by Alpheus Spring Packard in 1883, and elevated to the rank of family by Simon in 1886. Six genera are recognised, in two subfamilies:

Branchinellinae

- Branchinella Sayce, 1903
- Dendrocephalus Daday, 1908
- Phallocryptus Birabén, 1951
- Spiralifrons Dixon, 2010

Thamnocephalinae

- Carinophallus Rogers, 2006
- Thamnocephalus Packard, 1879
