= Otopharynx ovatus =

Conservation status
- Least Concern (IUCN 3.1)

Scientific classification
- Kingdom: Animalia
- Phylum: Chordata
- Class: Actinopterygii
- Order: Cichliformes
- Family: Cichlidae
- Genus: Otopharynx
- Species: O. ovatus

Binomial name
- Otopharynx ovatus (Trewavas, 1935)

Synonyms
- Haplochromis ovatus Trewavas, 1935; Cyrtocara ovata (Trewavas, 1935); Cyrtocara ovatus (Trewavas, 1935)

Species of fish

Otopharynx ovatus is a species of cichlid endemic to Lake Malawi. This species can reach a length of 20 centimetres (7.9 in) TL. It can also be found in the aquarium trade.
