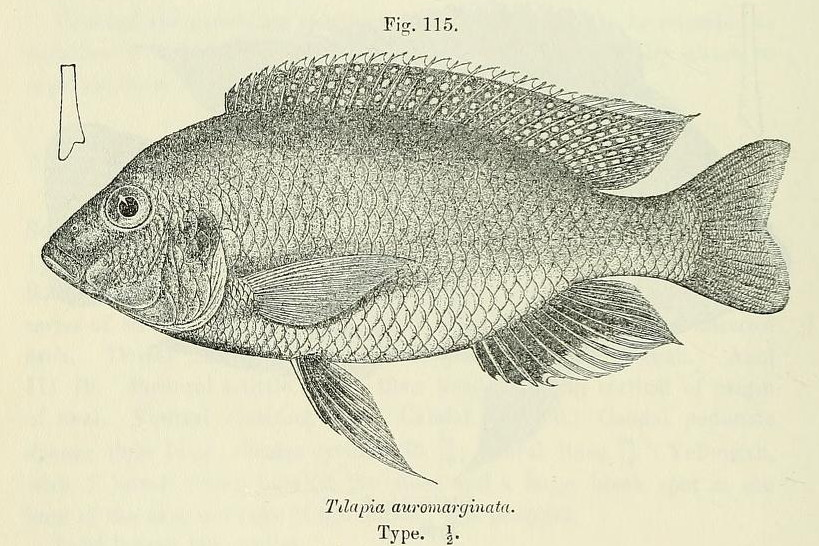

Conservation status
- Least Concern (IUCN 3.1)

Scientific classification
- Kingdom: Animalia
- Phylum: Chordata
- Class: Actinopterygii
- Order: Cichliformes
- Family: Cichlidae
- Genus: Otopharynx
- Species: O. auromarginatus

Binomial name
- Otopharynx auromarginatus (Boulenger, 1908)

Synonyms
- Tilapia auromarginata Boulenger, 1908; Cyrtocara auromarginata (Boulenger, 1908); Haplochromis auromarginatus (Boulenger, 1908)

= Golden-margined hap =

Species of fish

The golden-margined hap (Otopharynx auromarginatus) is a species of cichlid native to Lake Malawi as well as the upper Shire River. This species can reach a length of 24.5 centimetres (9.6 in) TL. This species can also be found in the aquarium trade.
