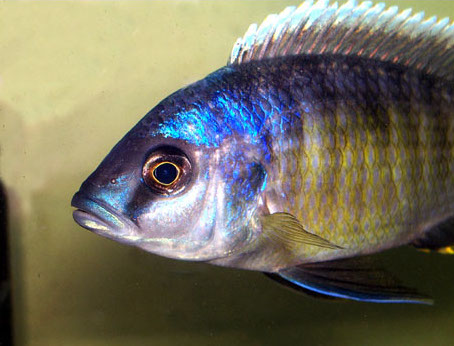

Conservation status
- Least Concern (IUCN 3.1)

Scientific classification
- Kingdom: Animalia
- Phylum: Chordata
- Class: Actinopterygii
- Order: Cichliformes
- Family: Cichlidae
- Genus: Otopharynx
- Species: O. tetraspilus

Binomial name
- Otopharynx tetraspilus (Trewavas, 1935)

Synonyms
- Haplochromis tetraspilus Trewavas, 1935; Cyrtocara tetraspilus (Trewavas, 1935)

= Otopharynx tetraspilus =

Species of fish

Otopharynx tetraspilus is a species of cichlid endemic to Lake Malawi, where it is only known from the southern end of the lake. This species can reach a length of 15.6 centimetres (6.1 in) TL. It can also be found in the aquarium trade.
