= Royal blue hap =

Conservation status
- Least Concern (IUCN 3.1)

Scientific classification
- Kingdom: Animalia
- Phylum: Chordata
- Class: Actinopterygii
- Order: Cichliformes
- Family: Cichlidae
- Genus: Otopharynx
- Species: O. heterodon

Binomial name
- Otopharynx heterodon (Trewavas, 1935)

Synonyms
- Haplochromis heterodon Trewavas, 1935; Cyrtocara heterodon (Trewavas, 1935)

Species of fish

The royal blue hap (Otopharynx heterodon) is a species of cichlid endemic to Lake Malawi. This species can reach a length of 12.8 centimetres (5.0 in) TL. It can also be found in the aquarium trade.
