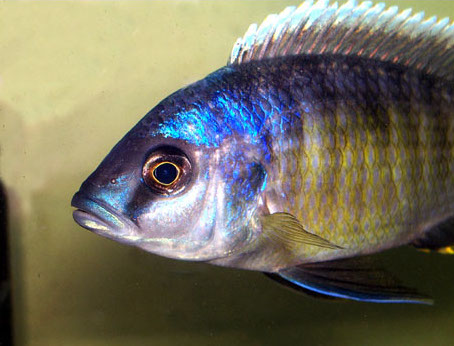
- O. tetraspilus

Scientific classification
- Kingdom: Animalia
- Phylum: Chordata
- Class: Actinopterygii
- Order: Cichliformes
- Family: Cichlidae
- Tribe: Haplochromini
- Genus: Otopharynx; Regan, 1920

Type species
- Tilapia auromarginata Boulenger, 1908

= Otopharynx =

Genus of fishes

Otopharynx is a genus of haplochromine cichlids endemic to Lake Malawi in Eastern Africa.

== Species ==
There are currently 20 recognized species in this genus:

- Otopharynx aletes Oliver, 2018
- Otopharynx alpha Oliver, 2018
- Otopharynx antron Cleaver, Konings & Stauffer, 2009
- Otopharynx argyrosoma (Regan, 1922)
- Otopharynx auromarginatus (Boulenger, 1908) (Golden-margined hap)
- Otopharynx brooksi M. K. Oliver, 1989
- Otopharynx decorus (Trewavas, 1935)
- Otopharynx heterodon (Trewavas, 1935) (Royal blue hap)
- Otopharynx lithobates M. K. Oliver, 1989
- Otopharynx mumboensis Oliver, 2018
- Otopharynx ovatus (Trewavas, 1935)
- Otopharynx pachycheilus Arnegard & Snoeks, 2001
- Otopharynx panniculus Oliver, 2018
- Otopharynx peridodeka Oliver, 2018
- Otopharynx selenurus Regan, 1922
- Otopharynx speciosus (Trewavas, 1935)
- Otopharynx spelaeotes Cleaver, Konings & Stauffer, 2009
- Otopharynx styrax Oliver, 2018
- Otopharynx tetraspilus (Trewavas, 1935)
- Otopharynx tetrastigma (Günther, 1894)
