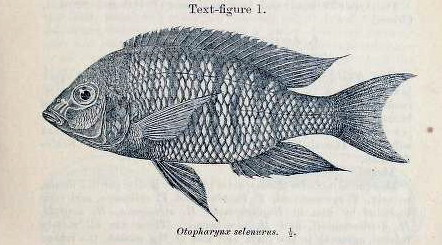

Conservation status
- Data Deficient (IUCN 3.1)

Scientific classification
- Kingdom: Animalia
- Phylum: Chordata
- Class: Actinopterygii
- Order: Cichliformes
- Family: Cichlidae
- Genus: Otopharynx
- Species: O. selenurus

Binomial name
- Otopharynx selenurus Regan, 1922

Synonyms
- Cyrtocara selenura (Regan, 1922); Haplochromis selenurus (Regan, 1922)

= Otopharynx selenurus =

Species of fish

Otopharynx selenurus is a species of cichlid endemic to Lake Malawi, an African Great Lake. This species can reach a length of 17.5 centimetres (6.9 in) total length (TL). It can be found in the aquarium trade.
