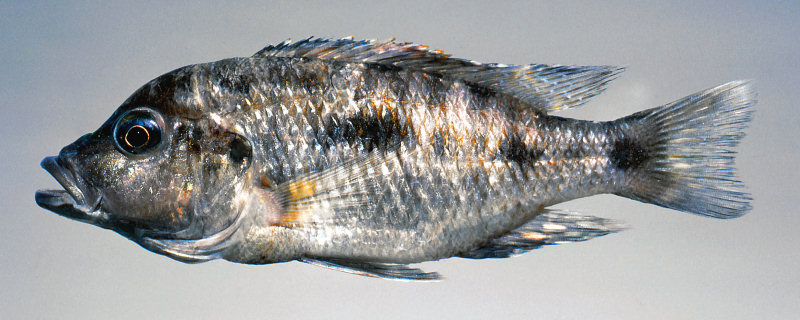

Conservation status
- Least Concern (IUCN 3.1)

Scientific classification
- Kingdom: Animalia
- Phylum: Chordata
- Class: Actinopterygii
- Order: Cichliformes
- Family: Cichlidae
- Genus: Otopharynx
- Species: O. brooksi

Binomial name
- Otopharynx brooksi M. K. Oliver, 1989

Synonyms
- Cyrtocara brooksi M. K. Oliver, 1984 (ambiguous)

= Otopharynx brooksi =

Species of fish

Otopharynx brooksi is a species of cichlid endemic to Lake Malawi. This species can reach a length of 15 centimetres (5.9 in) TL. This species can also be found in the aquarium trade. The specific name of this fish honours John Langdon Brooks (1920–2000), an evolutionary biologist at Yale University.
