= Otopharynx pachycheilus =

Conservation status
- Vulnerable (IUCN 3.1)

Scientific classification
- Kingdom: Animalia
- Phylum: Chordata
- Class: Actinopterygii
- Order: Cichliformes
- Family: Cichlidae
- Genus: Otopharynx
- Species: O. pachycheilus

Binomial name
- Otopharynx pachycheilus Arnegard & Snoeks, 2001

Species of fish

Otopharynx pachycheilus (rubberlip hap) is a cichlid endemic to Lake Malawi. This species can reach a length of 16.5 centimetres (6.5 in) TL.
