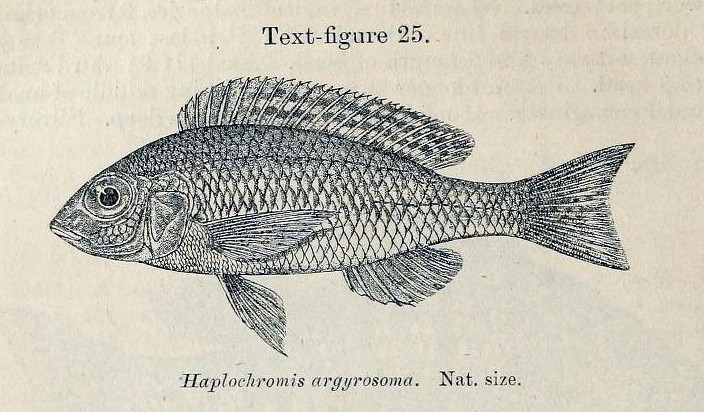

Conservation status
- Least Concern (IUCN 3.1)

Scientific classification
- Kingdom: Animalia
- Phylum: Chordata
- Class: Actinopterygii
- Order: Cichliformes
- Family: Cichlidae
- Genus: Otopharynx
- Species: O. argyrosoma

Binomial name
- Otopharynx argyrosoma (Regan, 1922)

Synonyms
- Haplochromis argyrosoma Regan, 1922; Cyrtocara argyrosoma (Regan, 1922)

= Otopharynx argyrosoma =

Species of fish

Otopharynx argyrosoma is a species of cichlid endemic to Lake Malawi. This species can reach a length of 15.2 centimetres (6.0 in) TL. This species can also be found in the aquarium trade.
