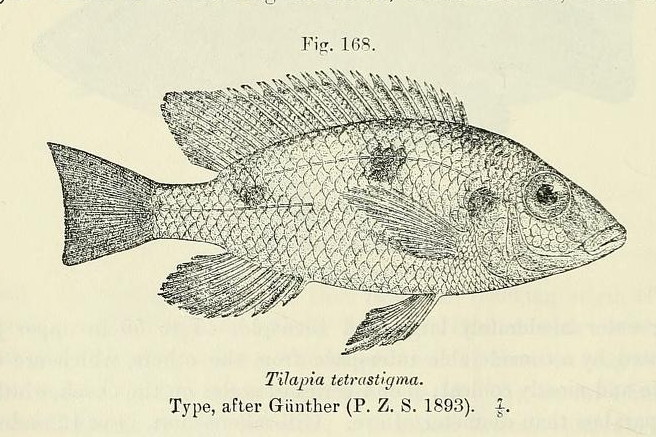

Conservation status
- Least Concern (IUCN 3.1)

Scientific classification
- Kingdom: Animalia
- Phylum: Chordata
- Class: Actinopterygii
- Order: Cichliformes
- Family: Cichlidae
- Genus: Otopharynx
- Species: O. tetrastigma

Binomial name
- Otopharynx tetrastigma (Günther, 1894)

Synonyms
- Chromis tetrastigma Günther, 1894; Cyrtocara tetrastigma (Günther, 1894); Haplochromis tetrastigma (Günther, 1894); Tilapia tetrastigma (Günther, 1894)

= Otopharynx tetrastigma =

Species of fish

Otopharynx tetrastigma is a species of cichlid native to Lake Malawi, Lake Malombe and the upper reaches of the Shire River. This species can reach a length of 16 centimetres (6.3 in) TL. It can also be found in the aquarium trade.
