= Otopharynx speciosus =

Conservation status
- Least Concern (IUCN 3.1)

Scientific classification
- Kingdom: Animalia
- Phylum: Chordata
- Class: Actinopterygii
- Order: Cichliformes
- Family: Cichlidae
- Genus: Otopharynx
- Species: O. speciosus

Binomial name
- Otopharynx speciosus (Trewavas, 1935)

Synonyms
- Haplochromis speciosus Trewavas, 1935; Cyrtocara speciosa (Trewavas, 1935)

Species of fish

Otopharynx speciosus is a species of cichlid endemic to Lake Malawi. This species can reach a length of 25.2 centimetres (9.9 in) TL. It has not yet been collected and exported for the aquarium trade.
