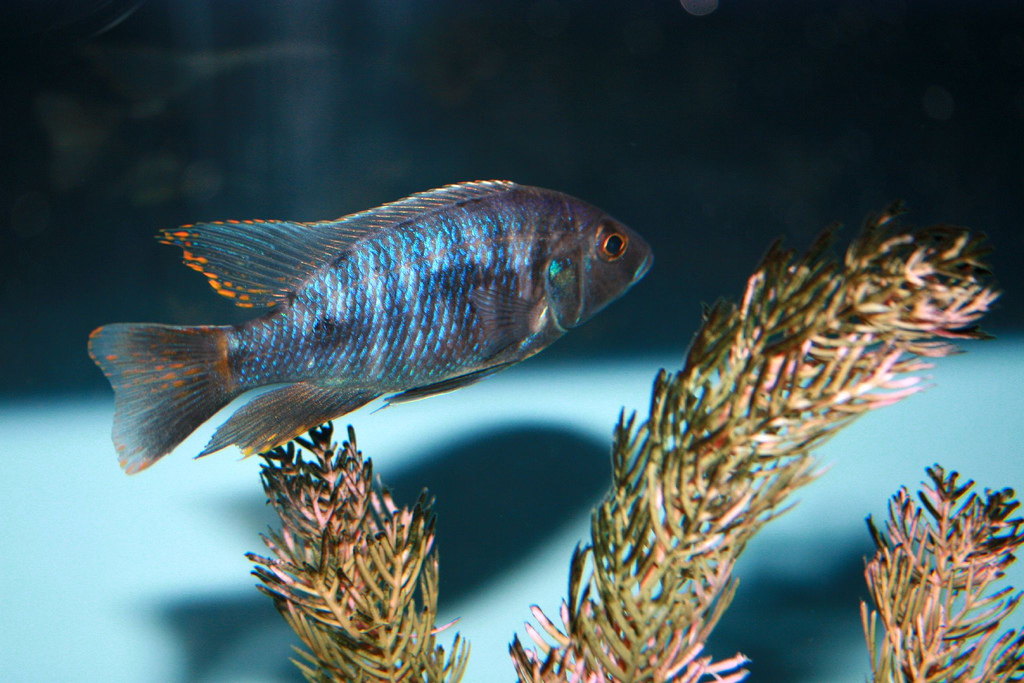

Conservation status
- Least Concern (IUCN 3.1)

Scientific classification
- Kingdom: Animalia
- Phylum: Chordata
- Class: Actinopterygii
- Order: Cichliformes
- Family: Cichlidae
- Genus: Otopharynx
- Species: O. lithobates

Binomial name
- Otopharynx lithobates M. K. Oliver, 1989

Synonyms
- Otopharynx lithobates M. K. Oliver, 1984 (ambiguous); Otopharynx walteri Konings, 1990

= Otopharynx lithobates =

Species of fish

Otopharynx lithobates is a species of cichlid endemic to Lake Malawi. This species can reach a length of 16 centimetres (6.3 in) TL. This species can also be found in the aquarium trade. As O. walteri this species was known as Aristochromis deep in the aquarium trade.
