= John Langdon Brooks =

John Langdon Brooks (1920-2000) was an American evolutionary biologist, ecologist and limnologist.

Brooks was born in 1920, probably in Hamden, Connecticut, his father was John Alexander Brooks and his mother was Grace Evelyn Langdon, he had a sister Helen and a brother Richard.

Brooks attended Yale University, where he studied under the guidance of G. Evelyn Hutchinson. He remained at Yale, at the Osborn Zoological Laboratory, until 1969 where he worked on the ecology and evolution of freshwater biota. During this period he co-authored an article with Stanley Dodson entitled Predation, Body Size and Composition of Plankton which was published in Science in October 1965. This article discussed the effect of an introduced predator, the alewife, on the planktonic fauna of lakes in New England and has been widely cited. He was the first editor of the journal Systematic Zoology, his tenure lasting from 1952 to 1957.

Brooks joined the National Science Foundation in 1969 and in 1981 he became Director of the Division of Environmental Biology with responsibility for the programs of the Foundation on Ecology, Population Biology and Physiological Ecology, Ecosystem Studies, Systematic Biology, and Biological Research Resources. Brooks was also interested in the history of the understanding of evolution and in 1981–82 he took a sabbatical from the NSF to write Just Before the Origin: Alfred Russel Wallace's Theory of Evolution which was published in 1984. In this book Brooks sets out Alfred Russel Wallace's development of his concepts on evolution using Wallace's essays written from 1848 to 1858 as well as inferences in both published and unpublished papers written by Wallace. A large part of the information used by Brooks in this book had not been accessible to authors before this. The closing chapters of the book recount the events leading up to 1 July 1858 when the paper co-authored by Wallace and Charles Darwin was read to the Linnean Society in London. One aspect of this book which generated some controversy was Brooks' findings that Darwin may have plagiarized some of Wallace's work for On the Origin of Species, particularly the "principle of divergence", and this has not found support among other scholars in this field. Brooks retired from the NSF in June 1989. Brooks played an important in the development of the NSF's Long Term Ecological Research Program which studies the changes in ecosystems in a number of nature reserves over extended periods.

== Selected bibliography ==
The following is a selected bibliography of works authored or co-authored by Brooks:

- 1946 Cyclomorphosis in Daphnia: I. An Analysis of D. retrocurva and D. galeata Ecological Monographs 16 (4) 409-447
- 1950 Speciation in Ancient Lakes, The Quarterly Review of Biology 25 (1) 30-60
- 1950 Review: Recent Advances in Limnology Ecology Vol. 31 (4) 659-660
- 1957 The Systematics of North American Daphnia Connecticut Academy of Arts and Sciences, Yale University
- 1963 Predation, Body Size and Composition of Plankton with Stanley Dodson Science 150:28-35
- 1972 Extinction and the origin of organic diversity New Haven : Connecticut Academy of Arts and Science
- 1984 Just Before the Origin: Alfred Russel Wallace's Theory of Evolution Columbia University Press, New York, ISBN 0231056761

== Legacy ==
A haplochromine cichlid endemic to Lake Malawi was named Otopharynx brooksi in his honor in 1989 by M.K. Oliver.
