= Otopharynx decorus =

Conservation status
- Least Concern (IUCN 3.1)

Scientific classification
- Kingdom: Animalia
- Phylum: Chordata
- Class: Actinopterygii
- Order: Cichliformes
- Family: Cichlidae
- Genus: Otopharynx
- Species: O. decorus

Binomial name
- Otopharynx decorus (Trewavas, 1935)

Synonyms
- Haplochromis decorus Trewavas, 1935; Cyrtocara decora (Trewavas, 1935)

Species of fish

Otopharynx decorus is a species of cichlid endemic to Lake Malawi. This species can reach a length of 18 centimetres (7.1 in) TL. It can also be found in the aquarium trade.
