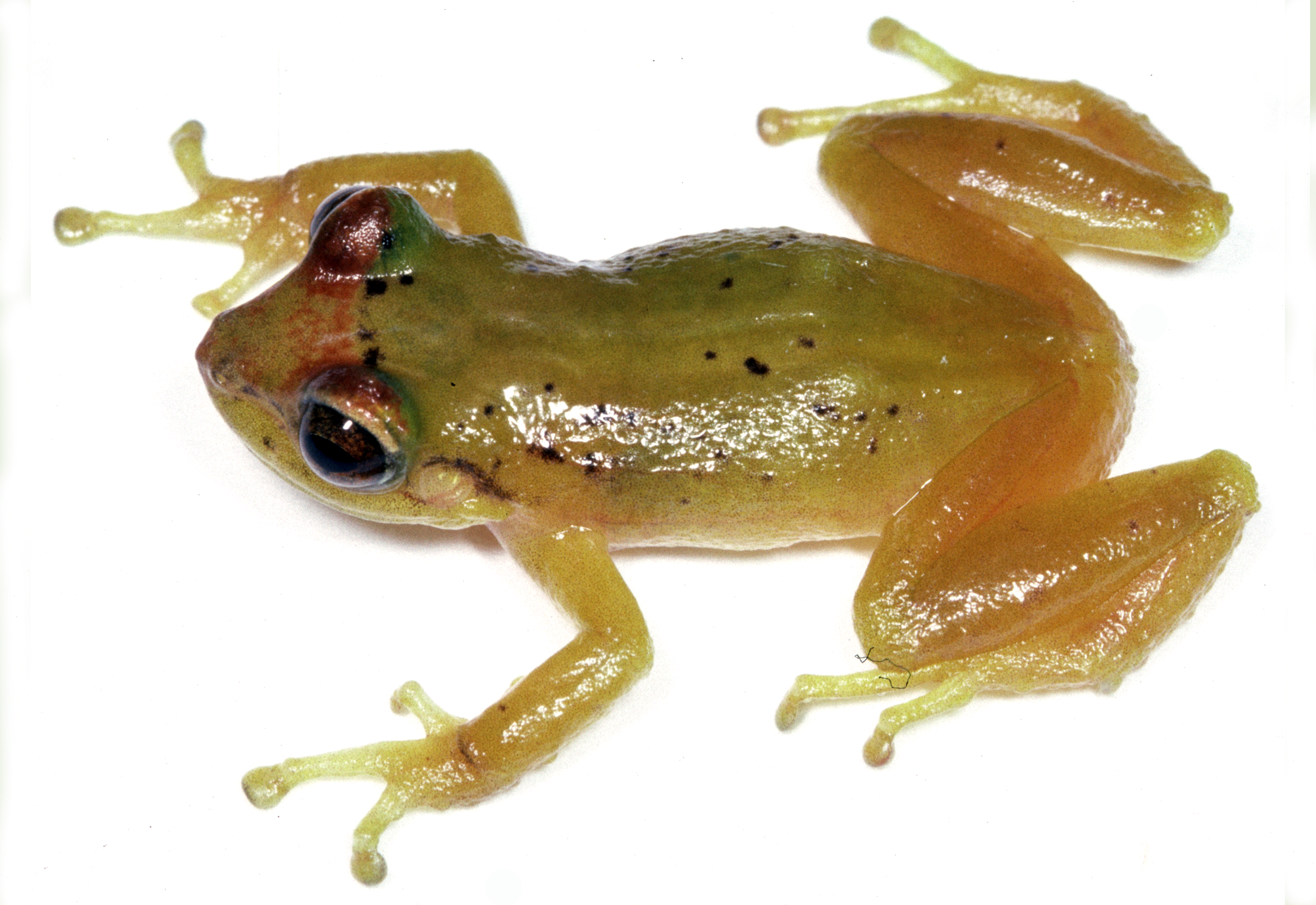

Conservation status
- Least Concern (IUCN 3.1)

Scientific classification
- Kingdom: Animalia
- Phylum: Chordata
- Class: Amphibia
- Order: Anura
- Clade: Brachycephaloidea
- Family: Craugastoridae
- Genus: Pristimantis
- Species: P. bromeliaceus

Binomial name
- Pristimantis bromeliaceus Lynch, 1979

Synonyms
- Eleutherodactylus bromeliaceus Lynch, 1979

= Pristimantis bromeliaceus =

Species of frog

Pristimantis bromeliaceus is a species of frog in the family Strabomantidae. It is found in Ecuador and Peru. Its natural habitat is tropical moist montane forests. It is threatened by habitat loss.
