= List of vulnerable molluscs =

- Extinct in the wild (EW): 12 species
- Critically endangered (CR): 785 species
- Endangered (EN): 708 species
- Vulnerable (VU): 1,123 species
- Near threatened (NT, LR/cd): 823 species
- Least concern (LC): 3,526 species
- Data deficient (DD): 2,229 species
Mollusc species (IUCN, 2025.2)
- 9,502 extant species have been evaluated
- 7,273 of those are fully assessed (Note: excludes data deficient evaluations.)
- 4,358 are not threatened at present
- 2,915 to 5,144 are threatened (Note: Threatened comprises CR, EN and VU. Upper estimate additionally includes DD.)
- 308 to 476 are extinct or extinct in the wild:
  - 296 extinct (EX) species (Note: Chart omits extinct (EX) species)
  - 12 extinct in the wild (EW)
  - 167 possibly extinct [CR(PE)]
  - 1 possibly extinct in the wild [CR(PEW)]

Vulnerable (VU) species are considered to be facing a high risk of extinction in the wild.

In September 2016, the International Union for Conservation of Nature (IUCN) listed 879 vulnerable mollusc species. Of all evaluated mollusc species, 12% are listed as vulnerable. The IUCN also lists 18 mollusc subspecies as vulnerable.

No subpopulations of molluscs have been evaluated by the IUCN.

For a species to be assessed as vulnerable to extinction the best available evidence must meet quantitative criteria set by the IUCN designed to reflect "a high risk of extinction in the wild". Endangered and critically endangered species also meet the quantitative criteria of vulnerable species, and are listed separately. See: List of endangered molluscs, List of critically endangered molluscs. Vulnerable, endangered and critically endangered species are collectively referred to as threatened species by the IUCN.

Additionally 1988 mollusc species (27% of those evaluated) are listed as data deficient, meaning there is insufficient information for a full assessment of conservation status. As these species typically have small distributions and/or populations, they are intrinsically likely to be threatened, according to the IUCN. While the category of data deficient indicates that no assessment of extinction risk has been made for the taxa, the IUCN notes that it may be appropriate to give them "the same degree of attention as threatened taxa, at least until their status can be assessed".

This is a complete list of vulnerable mollusc species and subspecies evaluated by the IUCN.

== Gastropods ==
There are 828 species and 16 subspecies of gastropod assessed as vulnerable.

=== Stylommatophora ===
Stylommatophora includes the majority of land snails and slugs. There are 339 species and six subspecies in the order Stylommatophora assessed as vulnerable.

==== Charopids ====
- Allocharopa erskinensis
- Cralopa colliveri
- Dupucharopa millestriata
- Geminoropa scindocataracta
- Hedleyoconcha ailaketoae
- Lagivala minusculus
- Lagivala vivus
- Microcharopa mimula
- Norfolcioconch iota
- Norfolcioconch norfolkensis
- Oreomava otwayensis
- Penescosta mathewsi
- Penescosta sororcula
- Pernagera gatliffi
- Pilsbrycharopa tumida
- Pilula praetumida
- Radiodiscus compactus
- Rhysoconcha atanuiensis
- Roblinella agnewi
- Ruatara oparica
- Sinployea adposita
- Sinployea godeffroyana
- Sinployea inermis
- Sinployea lauenis
- Sinployea monstrosa
- Sinployea pitcairnensis
- Sinployea recursa

==== Helicarionids ====
- Buffetia retinaculum
- Diastole tenuistriata
- Harmogenanina argentea
- Helicarion leopardina
- Helicarion porrectus
- Burgundy snail (Helicarion rubicundus)
- Iredaleoconcha caporaphe
- Kaliella hongkongensis
- Philonesia filiceti
- Philonesia pitcairnensis
- Pittoconcha concinna
- Theskelomensor creon
- Tubuaia fosbergi

==== Orthalicids ====
- Bothriembryon bradshaweri
- Bothriembryon brazieri
- Bothriembryon glauerti
- Bothriembryon irvineanus
- Bothriembryon spenceri
- Bothriembryon whitleyi
- Bulimulus akamatus
- Bulimulus alethorhytidus
- Bulimulus amastroides
- Bulimulus blombergi
- Bulimulus calvus
- Bulimulus cavagnaroi
- Bulimulus darwini
- Bulimulus hoodensis
- Bulimulus jervisensis
- Bulimulus nesioticus
- Bulimulus perrus
- Bulimulus rabidensis
- Bulimulus tortuganus
- Bulimulus unifasciatus
- Bulimulus ustulatus
- Drymaeus acervatus
- Drymaeus henseli
- Placostylus ambagiosus
- New Zealand flax snail (Placostylus bollonsi)
- Placostylus eddystonensis
- Placostylus elobatus
- Placostylus fibratus
- Pupuharakeke or flax snail (Placostylus hongii)
- Placostylus malleatus
- Placostylus porphyrostomus

==== Euconulids ====
- Caldwellia imperfecta
- Ctenophila vorticella
- Dupontia levis
- Dupontia nitella
- Dupontia poweri
- Liardetia boninensis
- Plegma caelatura

==== Streptaxids ====
- Acanthennea erinacea
- Augustula braueri
- Gonidomus sulcatus
- Gonospira cylindrella
- Gonospira holostoma
- Gonospira madgei
- Gonospira striaticostus
- Gonospira teres
- Gonospira turgidula
- Gulella amboniensis
- Microstrophia nana
- Priodiscus costatus
- Priodiscus serratus
- Silhouettia silhouettae

==== Ferussaciids ====
- Amphorella cimensis
- Amphorella hypselia
- Amphorella iridescens
- Amphorella melampoides
- Cecilioides connollyi
- Cylichnidia ovuliformis

==== Helminthoglyptids ====
- White desert snail (Eremarionta immaculata)
- Thousand Palms desert snail (Eremarionta millepalmarum)
- Allyn Smith's banded snail (Helminthoglypta allynsmithi)
- Mesa shoulderband (Helminthoglypta coelata)
- Concentrated snail (Micrarionta facta)
- Gabb's snail (Micrarionta gabbii)
- Prickly Pear Island snail (Micrarionta opuntia)
- Keeled sideband (Monadenia circumcarinata)
- Trinity bristle snail (Monadenia setosa)
- Plain cactus snail (Xerarionta intercisa)
- Wreathed cactus snail (Xerarionta redimita)
- Bicolor cactus snail (Xerarionta tryoni)

==== Oxychilids ====
- Oxychilus oglasicola

==== Camaenids ====
- Carinotrachia carsoniana
- Cristilabrum isolatum
- Cristilabrum monodon
- Cristilabrum primum
- Cristilabrum rectum
- Cristilabrum simplex
- Cupedora nottensis
- Divellomelon hillieri
- Glyptorhagada bordaensis
- Glyptorhagada euglypta
- Glyptorhagada kooringensis
- Glyptorhagada tattawuppana
- Kimboraga koolanensis
- Kimboraga micromphala
- Kimboraga yammerana
- Mouldingia occidentalis
- Ningbingia australis
- Ningbingia bulla
- Ningbingia dentiens
- Ningbingia laurina
- Ningbingia octava
- Ningbingia res
- Mount Dryander scaly snail (Offachloritis dryanderensis)
- Ordtrachia elegans
- Bennett's woodland snail (Pallidelix bennetti)
- Pleuroxia hinsbyi
- Jenolan Caves woodland snail (Pommerhelix depressa)
- Prototrachia sedula
- Rhagada gibbensis
- Rhagada harti
- Semotrachia euzyga
- Setobaudinia spina
- Sinumelon bednalli
- Tolgachloritis campbelli
- Torresitrachia thedana
- Turgenitubulus aslini
- Turgenitubulus costus
- Turgenitubulus depressus
- Turgenitubulus foramenus
- Turgenitubulus opiranus
- Turgenitubulus pagodula
- Turgenitubulus tanmurrana
- Vidumelon wattii
- Westraltrachia alterna
- Westraltrachia inopinata
- Westraltrachia lievreana
- Westraltrachia porcata
- Westraltrachia recta
- Westraltrachia subtila
- Westraltrachia turbinata
- Youwanjela wilsoni

==== Lauriids ====
- Leiostyla arborea
- Leiostyla colvillei
- Leiostyla corneocostata
- Leiostyla ferraria
- Leiostyla filicum
- Leiostyla heterodon
- Leiostyla laurinea
- Leiostyla macilenta

==== Vertiginids ====
Species

- Acinolaemus carcharodon
- Anauchen informis
- Gastrocopta boninensis
- Hypselostoma megaphonum
- Hypselostoma perigyra
- Truncatellina lussinensis
- Desmoulin's whorl snail (Vertigo moulinsiana)
- Vertigo parcedentata

Subspecies

- Anauchen informis informis
- Anauchen informis parcedentata

==== Trissexodontids ====
- Hatumia cobosi
- Oestophora granesae
- Oestophora mariae
- Suboestophora altamirai
- Suboestophora hispanica
- Suboestophora jeresae

==== Helicids ====
Species

- Arianta xatartii
- Chilostoma adelozona
- Codringtonia elisabethae
- Codringtonia eucineta
- Codringtonia gittenbergeri
- Codringtonia helenae
- Codringtonia intusplicata
- Codringtonia neocrassa
- Codringtonia parnassia
- Hemicycla eurythyra
- Hemicycla inutilis
- Hemicycla pouchet
- Iberus campesinus
- Iberus ortizi
- Macularia saintivesi
- Tacheocampylaea carotii
- Tacheocampylaea raspailii
- Theba impugnata
- Tyrrheniberus ridens
- Tyrrheniberus villicus
- Vidovicia coerulans

Subspecies

- Hemicycla glyceia silensis

==== Hygromiids ====
Species

- Actinella actinophora
- Actinella armitageana
- Actinella giramica
- Actinella laciniosa
- Actinella littorinella
- Canariella bimbachensis
- Canariella fortunata
- Canariella hispidula
- Canariella leprosa
- Canariella pontelirae
- Canariella pthonera
- Candidula fiorii
- Candidula spadae
- Caseolus baixoensis
- Caseolus calculus
- Caseolus leptostictus
- Cernuellopsis ghisottii
- Ciliellopsis oglasae
- Cryptosaccus asturiensis
- Disculella spirulina
- Ganula gadirana
- Helicella valdeona
- Hygromia golasi
- Hygromia odeca
- Hygromia tassyi
- Hystricella leacockiana
- Cima discula (Hystricella turricula)
- Ichnusomunda usticensis
- Leptaxis furva
- Monacha rizzae
- Monacha ruffoi
- Monachoides fallax
- Moreletina obruta
- Nienhuisiella antonellae
- Polloneria contermina
- Pyrenaearia cotiellae
- Pyrenaearia daanidentata
- Pyrenaearia navasi
- Pyrenaearia parva
- Pyrenaearia velascoi
- Schileykiella bodoni
- Spirorbula squalida
- Xerocrassa cardonae
- Xerocrassa gharlapsi
- Xerocrassa roblesi
- Xerocrassa zaharensis
- Xerotricha bierzona

Subspecies

- Leptaxis simia portosancti

==== Vitrinids ====
- Oligolimax musignani
- Phenacolimax blanci
- Plutonia albopalliata
- Plutonia dianae
- Sardovitrina polloneriana

==== Chondrinids ====
- Abida ateni
- Chondrina centralis
- Chondrina gasulli
- Chondrina gerhardi
- Chondrina maginensis
- Chondrina oligodonta
- Rupestrella homala
- Rupestrella jaeckeli
- Rupestrella occulta
- Solatopupa cianensis
- Solatopupa psarolena

==== Enids ====
- Mastus amenazada
- Mastus claudia
- Napaeus boucheti
- Napaeus elegans
- Napaeus esbeltus
- Napaeus lichenicola
- Napaeus ornamentatus
- Napaeus roccellicola
- Napaeus rupicola
- Napaeus tagamichensis
- Napaeus taguluchensis

==== Other Stylommatophora ====
Species

- Agardhiella tunde
- Tight coin (Ammonitella yatesii)
- Ampelita soulaiana
- Archachatina bicarinata
- Argna bourguignatiana
- Argna valsabina
- Boettgeria obesiuscula
- Bofilliella subarcuata
- Boninosuccinea ogasawarae
- Boninosuccinea punctulispira
- Burnup's hunter slug (Chlamydephorus burnupi)
- Snake skin hunter slug (Chlamydephorus dimidius)
- Christianoconcha quintalia
- Clavator moreleti
- Cryptazeca elongata
- Cryptazeca monodonta
- Cryptazeca spelaea
- Cryptazeca subcylindrica
- Mission Creek Oregonian (Cryptomastix magnidentata)
- Deroceras tarraceuse
- Marbled disc (Discus marmorensis)
- Elasmias cernicum
- Elasmias kitaiwojimanum
- Falkneria camerani
- Gonyostomus insularis
- Lamellidea biplicata
- Lamellidea ogasawarana
- Microcystina sp. 'Ba Tai'
- Tongaland cannibal snail (Natalina wesseliana)
- Nesokaliella intermedia
- Nesokaliella minuta
- Nesokaliella subturritula
- Nesopupa madgei
- Obelus despreauxii
- Obelus moratus
- Orcula zilchi
- Boulder pile mountain snail (Oreohelix jugalis)
- Vortex banded mountain snail (Oreohelix vortex)
- Lava rock mountain snail (Oreohelix waltoni)
- Pachnodus lionneti
- Pachnodus praslinus
- Partula hyalina
- Cataract gorge snail (Pasmaditta jungermanniae)
- Ptychalaea dedecora
- Punctum seychellarum
- Samoana margaritae
- Sheldonia puzeyi
- Speleodentorcula beroni
- Stylodonta unidentata
- Thaumatodon laddi
- Trochomorpha abrochroa
- Trochomorpha accurata
- Videna electra
- Vitrea pseudotrolli
- Zyzzyxdonta alata

Subspecies

- Chlorilis hungerfordiana rufopila
- Spelaeodiscus triarius tatricus

=== Littorinimorpha ===
There are 324 species and seven subspecies in the order Littorinimorpha assessed as vulnerable.

==== Hydrobiids ====
Species

- Akiyoshia kobayashii
- Alzoniella cornucopia
- Alzoniella elliptica
- Alzoniella fabrianensis
- Alzoniella feneriensis
- Alzoniella haicabia
- Alzoniella junqua
- Alzoniella lunensis
- Alzoniella navarrensis
- Alzoniella perrisii
- Alzoniella somiedoensis
- Antrobia breweri
- Blue spring aphaostracon (Aphaostracon asthenes)
- Freemouth hydrobe snail (Aphaostracon chalarogyrus)
- Wekiwa hydrobe (Aphaostracon monas)
- Dense hydrobe (Aphaostracon pycnus)
- Arganiella wolfi
- Beddomeia angulata
- Beddomeia averni
- Beddomeia bellii
- Beddomeia bowryensis
- Beddomeia briansmithi
- Beddomeia camensis
- Beddomeia forthensis
- Beddomeia franklandensis
- Beddomeia fromensis
- Beddomeia fultoni
- Beddomeia gibba
- Beddomeia hallae
- Beddomeia hullii
- Beddomeia inflata
- Beddomeia kershawi
- Beddomeia kessneri
- Beddomeia krybetes
- Beddomeia launcestonensis
- Beddomeia lodderae
- Beddomeia mesibovi
- Beddomeia minima
- Beddomeia petterdi
- Beddomeia phasianella
- Beddomeia protuberata
- Beddomeia ronaldi
- Beddomeia salmonis
- Beddomeia tasmanica
- Beddomeia topsiae
- Beddomeia turnerae
- Beddomeia waterhouseae
- Beddomeia wilmotensis
- Beddomeia wiseae
- Beddomeia zeehanensis
- Belgrandia gfrast
- Belgrandia gibberula
- Belgrandia latina
- Belgrandia silviae
- Belgrandia sp. 'wiwanensis'
- Dalmatian belgrande (Belgrandia torifera)
- Belgrandiella angelovi
- Belgrandiella bulgarica
- Belgrandiella bureschi
- Belgrandiella croatica
- Belgrandiella crucis
- Belgrandiella dobrostanica
- Belgrandiella edessana
- Belgrandiella fuchsi
- Belgrandiella globulosa
- Belgrandiella hershleri
- Belgrandiella hessei
- Belgrandiella pusilla
- Belgrandiella schleschi
- Belgrandiella substricta
- Belgrandiella superior
- Belgrandiella zagoraensis
- Belgrandiella zermanica
- Boetersiella davisi
- Boleana umbilicata
- Bythinella angelitae
- Bythinella cebennensis
- Bythinella eurystoma
- Bythinella geisserti
- Bythinella ginolensis
- Bythinella isolata
- Bythinella jourdei
- Bythinella kapelana
- Bythinella kazdaghensis
- Bythinella micherdzinskii
- Bythinella molcsany
- Bythinella occasiuncula
- Bythinella padiraci
- Bythinella robiciana
- Bythinella rondelaudi
- Bythinella roubionensis
- Bythinella rubiginosa
- Bythinella vimperei
- Bythinella wawrzineki
- Bythiospeum acicula
- Bythiospeum drouetianum
- Bythiospeum exiguum
- Bythiospeum geyeri
- Bythiospeum haessleini
- Bythiospeum heldii
- Bythiospeum helveticum
- Hungarian blind snail (Bythiospeum hungaricum)
- Danubial blind snail (Bythiospeum oshanovae)
- Bythiospeum rasini
- Bythiospeum reisalpense
- Bythiospeum saxigenum
- Bythiospeum suevicum
- Bythiospeum waegelei
- Caledoconcha mariapetrae
- Catapyrgus sororius
- Cavernisa zaschevi
- Phantom cave snail (Cochliopa texana)
- Miller's snail (Cochliopina milleri)
- Harney Basin duskysnail (Colligyrus depressus)
- Durangonella de Coahuila snail (Durangonella coahuilae)
- Crystal siltsnail (Floridobia helicogyra)
- Ichetucknee siltsnail (Floridobia mica)
- Enterprise siltsnail (Floridobia monroensis)
- Pygmy siltsnail (Floridobia parva)
- Ponderous siltsnail (Floridobia ponderosa)
- Seminole siltsnail (Floridobia vanhyningi)
- Wekiwa siltsnail (Floridobia wekiwae)
- North Pine River freshwater snail (Fluvidona anodonta)
- Fluvidona dyeriana
- Fonscochlea accepta
- Fonscochlea conica
- Missouri cavesnail (Fontigens antroecetes)
- Ginaia munda
- Graecoanatolica kocapinarica
- Graziana quadrifoglio
- Graziana slavonica
- Guadiella andalucesis
- Guadiella arconadae
- Guadiella ramosae
- Hadopyrgus rawhiti
- Hadziella deminuta
- Hadziella krkae
- Hadziella sketi
- Hauffenia danubialis
- Hauffenia media
- Hauffenia sp.
- Hauffenia wagneri
- Hemistomia flexicolumella
- Hemistomia napaia
- Heraultiella exilis
- Horatia macedonica
- Horatia novoselensis
- Hydrobia djerbaensis
- Hydrobia luvilana
- Iberhoratia gatoa
- Iberhoratia morenoi
- Iglica acicularis
- Iglica elongata
- Iglica gracilis
- Iglica kleinzellensis
- Iglica langhofferi
- Iglica sidariensis
- Iglica tellinii
- Insignia macrostoma
- Islamia azarum
- Islamia bomangiana
- Islamia bosniaca
- Islamia cianensis
- Islamia epirana
- Islamia lagari
- Islamia spirata
- Jardinella coreena
- Jardinella corrugata
- Jardinella edgbastonensis
- Jardinella eulo
- Jardinella isolata
- Kerkia brezicensis
- Lanzaia kotlusae
- Lanzaia vjetrenicae
- Lanzaiopsis savinica
- Leiorhagium cathartes
- Leiorhagium orokau
- Leiorhagium supernum
- Leptopyrgus melbourni
- Flat pebblesnail (Lepyrium showalteri)
- Marstoniopsis croatica
- Mercuria bayonnensis
- Micropyrgula stankovici
- Nanocochlea monticola
- Nanocochlea pupoidea
- Neofossarulus stankovici
- Ohridohoratia polinskii
- Opacuincola caeca
- Opacuincola cervicesmadentes
- Opacuincola dulcinella
- Opacuincola eduardstraussi
- Opacuincola johannstraussi
- Opacuincola josefstraussi
- Opacuincola lentesferens
- Opacuincola ngatapuna
- Opacuincola ovata
- Opacuincola permutata
- Palacanthilhiopsis margritae
- Palacanthilhiopsis vervierii
- Paladilhiopsis buresi
- Paladilhiopsis grobbeni
- Paladilhiopsis thessalica
- Paludiscala de oro snail (Paludiscala caramba)
- Paraprososthenia lynnei
- Phrantela annamurrayae
- Phrantela conica
- Phrantela kutikina
- Mimic cavesnail (Phreatodrobia imitata)
- Plagigeyeria gladilini
- Plagigeyeria stochi
- Pontobelgrandiella nitida
- Potamopyrgus doci
- Potamopyrgus kaitunuparaoa
- Pseudamnicola anteisensis
- Pseudamnicola bacescui
- Pseudamnicola chia
- Pseudamnicola gasulli
- Pseudamnicola hydrobiopsis
- Pseudamnicola intranodosa
- Pseudamnicola malickyi
- Pseudamnicola meluzzii
- Pseudamnicola pieperi
- Pseudamnicola pisolinus
- Pseudohoratia brusinae
- Pseudohoratia lacustris
- Pseudohoratia ochridana
- Pyrgohydrobia grochmalickii
- Pyrgohydrobia sanctinaumi
- Amargosa springsnail (Pyrgulopsis amargosae)
- Pyrgulopsis avernalis
- Grand Wash springsnail (Pyrgulopsis bacchus)
- Kingman springsnail (Pyrgulopsis conica)
- Diablo range pyrg (Pyrgulopsis diablensis)
- Gila springsnail (Pyrgulopsis gilae)
- South Sierra Nevada springsnail (Pyrgulopsis giuliani)
- Verde Rim springsnail (Pyrgulopsis glandulosa)
- Kern River pyrg (Pyrgulopsis greggi)
- Montezuma Well springsnail (Pyrgulopsis montezumensis)
- Roswell springsnail (Pyrgulopsis roswellensis)
- Radomaniola callosa
- Radomaniola rhodopensis
- Rhamphopoma magnum
- Sadleriana supercarinata
- Saxurinator brandti
- Stankovicia pavlovici
- Stankovicia wagneri
- Sculpin snail (Stiobia nana)
- Strugia ohridana
- Bliss Rapids snail (Taylorconcha serpenticola)
- Tefennia tefennica
- Tongapyrgus kohitatea
- Trochidrobia minuta
- Trochidrobia smithi
- Turcorientalia anatolica
- Turcorientalia hohenackeri
- Turricaspia ismailensis
- Victodrobia millerae
- Xestopyrgula dybowskii

Subspecies

- Mexipyrgus de carranza snail (Mexipyrgus churinceanus carranzae)
- Mexipyrgus churinceanus churinceanus
- Mexipyrgus de escobeda snail (Mexipyrgus churinceanus escobedae)
- Mexipyrgus de lugo snail (Mexipyrgus churinceanus lugoi)
- Mexipyrgus de west el Mojarral snail (Mexipyrgus churinceanus mojarralis)
- Mexipyrgus de east el Mojarral snail (Mexipyrgus churinceanus multilineatus)
- Mexithauma de cienegas snail (Mexipyrgus churinceanus quadripaludium)

==== Cochliopids ====
- Heleobia andecola
- Heleobia aperta
- Heleobia aponensis
- Heleobia galilaea
- Heleobia ortoni

==== Bithyniids ====
- Bithynia badiella
- Bithynia cettinensis
- Bithynia graeca
- Bithynia kobialkai
- Bithynia pseudemmericia
- Bithynia quintanai
- Bithynia yildirimii
- Congodoma zairensis
- Gabbia pallidula
- Pseudobithynia ambrakis
- Pseudobithynia kirka
- Sierraia expansilabrum
- Sierraia leonensis

==== Moitessieriids ====
- Moitessieria calloti
- Moitessieria foui
- Moitessieria guadelopensis
- Moitessieria juvenisanguis
- Moitessieria lludrigaensis
- Moitessieria massoti
- Moitessieria mugae
- Moitessieria nezi
- Paladilhia jamblussensis
- Paladilhia roselloi
- Paladilhia umbilicata
- Palaospeum bessoni
- Spiralix gloriae
- Spiralix pequenoensis

==== Assimineids ====
- Acmella sp. 'Ba Tai'
- Badwater snail (Assiminea infirma)
- Fijianella calciphila
- Fijianella cornucopia
- Fijianella laddi
- Omphalotropis costulata
- Omphalotropis longula
- Omphalotropis rosea

==== Pomatiopsids ====
- Hubendickia pellucida
- Hydrorissoia munensis
- Jullienia albaobscura
- Jullienia costata
- Jullienia flava
- Jullienia minima
- Jullienia prasongi
- Lacunopsis deiecta
- Lacunopsis globosa
- Lacunopsis minutarpiettei
- Lacunopsis munensis
- Oncomelania nosophora
- Pachydrobia bertini
- Pachydrobia levayi
- Tricula conica
- Tricula mahadevensis

==== Amnicolids ====
- Amnicola cora
- Stygian amnicola (Amnicola stygius)
- Emmericia expansilabris
- Emmericia ventricosa

==== Other Littorinimorpha species ====
- Cremnoconchus conicus
- Modoc pebblesnail (Fluminicola modoci)
- Pseudobenedictia michnoi
- Stenothyra decollata
- Stenothyra laotiensis

=== Sorbeoconcha ===
There are 55 species in the order Sorbeoconcha assessed as vulnerable.

==== Pleurocerids ====
- Anthony's riversnail (Athearnia anthonyi)
- Acute elimia (Elimia acuta)
- Mud elimia (Elimia alabamensis)
- Coal elimia (Elimia aterina)
- Flaxen elimia (Elimia boykiniana)
- Spindle elimia (Elimia capillaris)
- Lacy elimia (Elimia crenatella)
- Silt elimia (Elimia haysiana)
- Gladiator elimia (Elimia hydei)
- Knotty elimia (Elimia interrupta)
- Round-rib elimia (Elimia nassula)
- Caper elimia (Elimia olivula)
- Nymph elimia (Elimia porrecta)
- Spring elimia (Elimia pybasi)
- Brook elimia (Elimia strigosa)
- Elegant elimia (Elimia teres)
- Puzzle elimia (Elimia varians)
- Leptoxis ampla
- Knob mudalia (Leptoxis minor)
- Spotted rocksnail (Leptoxis picta)
- Mainstream river snail (Leptoxis praerosa)
- Smooth rocksnail (Leptoxis virgata)
- Armigerous river snail (Lithasia armigera)
- Dutton's river snail (Lithasia duttoniana)
- Muddy rocksnail (Lithasia salebrosa)
- Rugged hornsnail (Pleurocera alveare)
- Ringed hornsnail (Pleurocera annulifera)
- Spiral hornsnail (Pleurocera brumbyi)
- Shortspire hornsnail (Pleurocera curta)
- Upland hornsnail (Pleurocera showalteri)
- Telescope hornsnail (Pleurocera walkeri)

==== Melanopsids ====
- Esperiana sangarica
- Melanopsis subgraellsiana

==== Thiarids ====
- Melanoides depravata
- Melanoides dupuisi
- Melanoides mweruensis
- Semisulcospira decipiens
- Semisulcospira niponica
- Semisulcospira ourense

==== Pachychilids ====
- Brotia annamita
- Brotia citrina
- Brotia hoabinhensis
- Brotia laodelectata
- Brotia paludiformis
- Brotia solemiana
- Brotia subgloriosa
- Brotia wykoffi
- Potadoma alutacea
- Potadoma vogeli

==== Paludomids ====
- Cleopatra cridlandi
- Cleopatra exarata
- Cleopatra obscura
- Reymondia tanganyicensis
- Tanganyicia michelae

=== Architaenioglossa ===
Species

- Acicula benoiti
- Acicula multilineata
- Acicula norrisi
- Acicula palaestinensis
- Amphicyclotulus liratus
- Amphicyclotulus perplexus
- Boucardicus albocinctus
- Boucardicus antiquus
- Boucardicus rakotoarisoni
- Boucardicus tridentatus
- Slender campeloma (Campeloma decampi)
- Cochlostoma acutum
- Cochlostoma affine
- Cochlostoma canestrinii
- Cochlostoma erika
- Cochlostoma fuchsi
- Cochlostoma paladilhianum
- Craspedopoma lyonnetianum
- Cyathopoma randalana
- Diancta macrostoma
- Ditropis whitei
- Fijiopoma diatreta
- Hedleya macleayi
- Lanistes ciliatus
- Lanistes farleri
- Cylindrical lioplax (Lioplax cyclostomaformis)
- Opisthostoma bihamulatum
- Opisthostoma michaelis
- Palaina godeffroyana
- Palaina strigata
- Palaina subregularis
- Platyla foliniana
- Platyla jankowskiana
- Platyla lusitanica
- Platyla maasseni
- Platyla peloponnesica
- Platyla procax
- Platyrhaphe sp. 1
- Plectostoma senex
- Pomacea palmeri
- Pomacea quinindensis
- Renea gentilei
- Renea gormonti
- Renea paillona
- Suavocallia splendens

Subspecies

- Renea moutonii moutonii
- Renea moutonii singularis

=== Lower Heterobranchia species ===
- Glacidorbis occidentalis
- Valvata hirsutecostata
- Valvata relicta
- Utah roundmouth snail (Valvata utahensis)
- Emerald valvata (Valvata virens)

=== Cycloneritimorpha ===
- Georissa laseroni
- Monterissa gowerensis
- Neritina granosa
- Theodoxus marteli
- Theodoxus numidicus

=== Hygrophila ===
Species

- Rocky Mountain capshell (Acroloxus coloradensis)
- Acroloxus egirdirensis
- Acroloxus improvisus
- Acroloxus tetensi
- Ancylus scalariformis
- Bulinus mutandensis
- Bulinus obtusus
- Chilina angusta
- Newcomb's snail (Erinna newcombi)
- Gyraulus albidus
- Gyraulus argaeicus
- Gyraulus bakeri
- Gyraulus bekaensis
- Gyraulus nedyalkovi
- Gyraulus pamphylicus
- Kutikina hispida
- Lymnaea ovalior
- Miratesta celebensis
- Wet wall snail (Physa zionis)
- Cave physa (Physella spelunca)
- Utah physa (Physella utahensis)
- Wet rock physa (Physella zionis)
- Magnificent ramshorn (Planorbella magnifica)
- Lamb ramshorn (Planorbella oregonensis)
- Planorbis presbensis
- Domed ancylid (Rhodacmea elatior)

Subspecies

- Gyraulus connollyi exilis

=== Neogastropoda ===
==== Conids ====
- Conus allaryi
- Florida cone (Conus anabathrum)
- Conus ardisiaceus
- Conus cacao
- Conus cepasi
- Conus compressus
- Conus cuvieri
- Conus decoratus
- Conus duffyi
- Conus felitae
- Conus fontonae
- Conus guinaicus
- Conus henckesi
- Conus hennequini
- Hieroglyphic cone (Conus hieroglyphus)
- Conus immelmani
- Conus jeanmartini
- Conus julii
- Conus melvilli
- Conus rawaiensis
- Conus regonae
- Richard's cone (Conus richardbinghami)
- Conus stearnsii
- Conus tacomae
- Conus teodorae
- Conus thevenardensis
- Conus xicoi

=== Eupulmonata ===
- Zospeum biscaiense
- Zospeum exiguum

== Bivalvia ==
There are 49 species and two subspecies in the class Bivalvia assessed as vulnerable.

=== Unionida ===
There are 37 species and two subspecies in the order Unionoida assessed as vulnerable.

==== Margaritiferids ====
- Middendorff's freshwater pearl mussel (Margaritifera middendorffi)

==== Unionids ====
Species

- Dwarf wedgemussel (Alasmidonta heterodon)
- Brazzaea anceyi
- Coelatura lobensis
- Coelatura rotula
- Cuneopsis rufescens
- Roanoke slabshell (Elliptio roanokensis)
- Purple bankclimber (Elliptoideus sloatianus)
- Long solid mussel (Fusconaia subrotunda)
- Lamprotula blaisei
- Lamprotula polysticta
- Lamprotula rochechouartii
- Lamprotula scripta
- Lamprotula tortuosa
- Pink mucket (Lampsilis abrupta)
- Lampsilis dolabraeformis
- Microcondylaea bonellii
- Mweruella mweruensis
- Southern hickorynut (Obovaria jacksoniana)
- Parreysia khadakvaslaensis
- Tennessee clubshell (Pleurobema oviforme)
- Fuzzy pigtoe (Pleurobema strodeanum)
- Fat pocketbook pearly mussel (Potamilus capax)
- Depressed river mussel (Pseudanodonta complanata)
- Savannah lilliput (Toxolasma pullus)
- Unio terminalis
- Unio tumidiformis

Subspecies

- Lampsilis reeviana reeviana

==== Hyriids ====
- Castalia martensi
- Diplodon expansus
- Diplodon pfeifferi
- Carter's freshwater mussel (Westralunio carteri)

==== Iridinids ====
Species

- Aspatharia divaricata
- Chambardia nyassaensis
- Mutela alata
- Mutela franci
- Mutela legumen

Subspecies

- Chambardia wahlbergi guillaini

==== Mycetopodids ====
- Diplodontites olssoni

=== Cardiida ===
- Bear paw clam (Hippopus hippopus)
- Southern giant clam (Tridacna derasa)
- Giant clam (Tridacna gigas)
- Tevoro clam (Tridacna mbalavuana)
- Tridacna rosewateri

=== Arcida ===
- Scaphula nagarjunai

=== Venerida ===
- Congeria kusceri
- Dreissena blanci
- Pisidium artifex
- Pisidium centrale
- Pisidium sanguinichristi
- Montane peaclam (Pisidium ultramontanum)
- River orb mussel (Sphaerium rivicola)

== Cephalopods ==
- Opisthoteuthis calypso
- Opisthoteuthis massyae

== See also ==
- Lists of IUCN Red List vulnerable species
- List of least concern molluscs
- List of near threatened molluscs
- List of endangered molluscs
- List of critically endangered molluscs
- List of recently extinct molluscs
- List of data deficient molluscs
