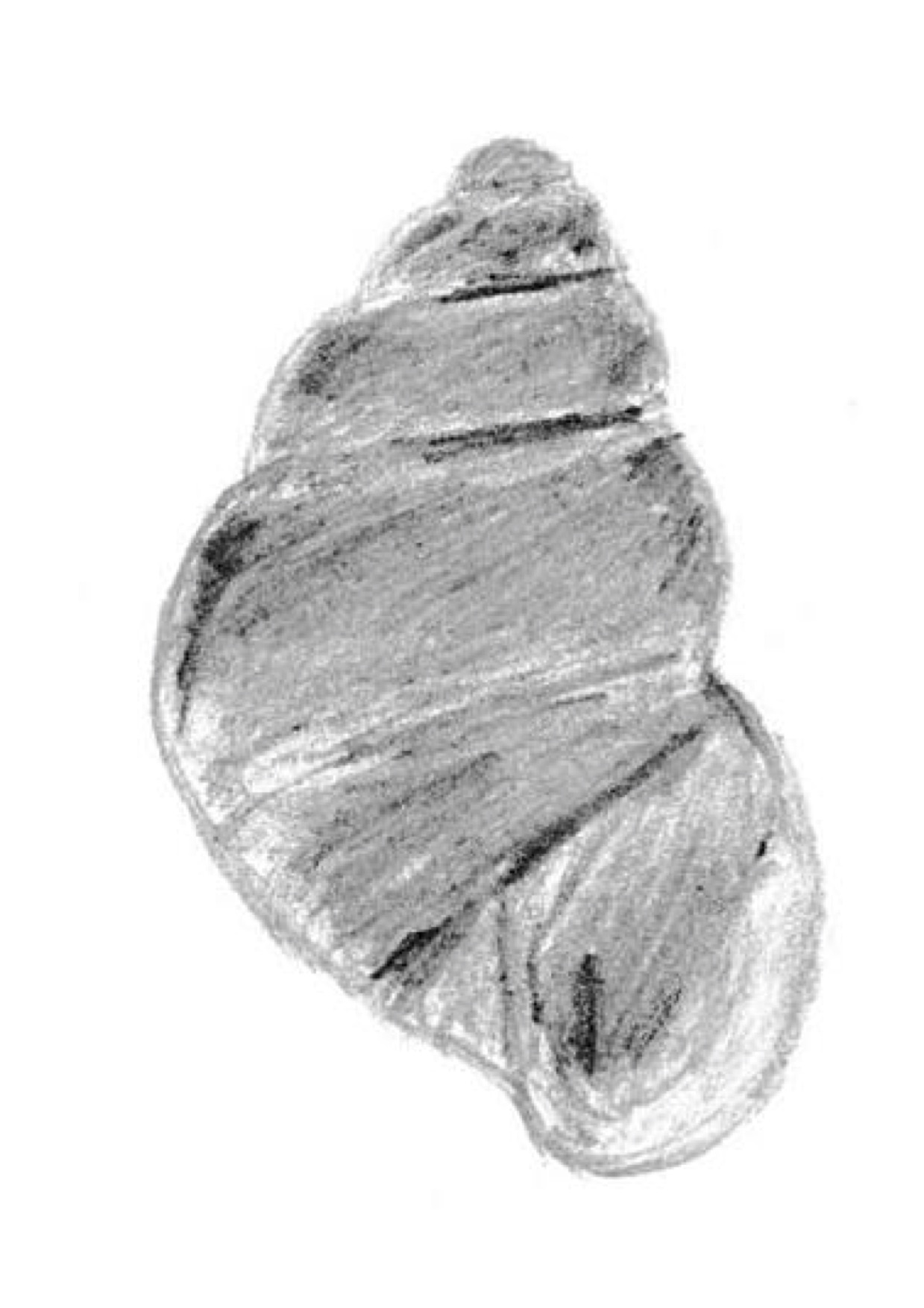
- Sketch of Beddomeia hallae

Conservation status
- Vulnerable (IUCN 3.1)

Scientific classification
- Kingdom: Animalia
- Phylum: Mollusca
- Class: Gastropoda
- Subclass: Caenogastropoda
- Order: Littorinimorpha
- Family: Tateidae
- Genus: Beddomeia
- Species: B. hallae

Binomial name
- Beddomeia hallae Ponder & Clark, 1993

= Beddomeia hallae =

Species of gastropod

Beddomeia hallae, also known as Buttons Rivulet hydrobiid snail, is a species of small freshwater snail that is endemic to Australia. The species is an aquatic operculate gastropod mollusk in the family Hydrobiidae. Beddomeia hallae belongs to the genus Beddomeia, which is the largest group in the family Hydrobiidae, consisting of 47 species. In the Threatened Species Protection Act 1995, this species is one of the 37 Beddomeia species listed as endangered, however, on the International Union for Conservation of Nature Red List, the species is listed as vulnerable. Found in Tasmania, in the streams of Buttons Rivulet and Castra Rivulet, Beddomeia hallae is sighted in its natural habitat amongst wood, leaves and under stones. Nonetheless, the Beddomeia species including Beddomeia hallae are geographically isolated, existing within restricted ranges.

Beddomeia hallae's survival as a species is threatened by agricultural clearing, forestry practices, mining and impoundment construction, resulting in habitat degradation or modification. However, for Beddomeia hallae, the main limiting factors are agricultural land practices and production forestry. To manage the threatened status of the Beddomeia hallae species, management objectives use the precautionary principle in preventing the degradation or loss of habitat containing existing populations, as well as identifying where new subpopulations occur, improving the reservation status and increasing public awareness of this species. Freshwater hydrobiid snails depend on their habitat for survival, therefore the protection of the habitat in the long-term is important to the survival of this species. Beddomeia hallae may experience difficulty in dispersing outside their immediate habitat, which can affect the survival of this species.

== Etymology ==
Mollusca means "soft-bodied" and it is one of the largest animal phyla. Mollusc is derived from the Latin word "mollis," meaning "soft." The term Gastropoda means "stomach-foot", where Greek root words gastro means stomach and pod means foot. This name was given because a sea slug's stomach is in its foot. Beddomeia hallae's name is honours Jane Hall, for her extensive contributions as a research assistant in fieldwork for a study conducted in Tasmania.

== Taxonomy ==
Freshwater snails belong to the phylum Mollusca, the second-largest animal phylum consisting of over 100 species including clams, snails, slugs and squid and lesser known animals like tusk shells and chitons. As Beddomeia hallae is a snail, it belongs to the class Gastropoda, which is the most diverse class in phylum Mollusca with 60,000 to 80,000 existing species. Beddomeia hallae belongs to the family Hydrobiidae, which is distributed across the world, including in Australia and New Zealand. Around 200 species are found in Australia, mostly from south-eastern region, including Tasmania. Howe Island and the artesian springs of northern South Australia and southern Queensland are also places where Hydrobiidae species can be found. The Beddomeia complex, which totals 67 species, can be separated into four distinct genera: Beddomeia, Phrantela, Nanocochlea, which are endemic to Tasmania, and the fourth genus, Victodrobia, which only occurs in eastern Victoria. However, the distributions of Tasmania's hydrobiid genera, especially between Beddomeia and Phrantela which are closely related demonstrate a level of separation. Beddomeia hallae belongs to the genera Beddomeia, the largest group in the family Hydrobiidae, totalling 47 species, which are found mostly across the northern third of the Tasmanian state.

== Anatomy ==
Beddomeia and Phrantela, another genus of snails in the family Hydrobiidae can be identified by their shell or anatomical characteristics. Beddomeia snails have a small elongate, upwardly spiralling and tapering shell, usually 1 – 7 mm, with 5 to 8 whorls. In line with Beddomeia characteristics, Beddomeia hallae has a protoconch of about two smooth whorls except for a few spirally arranged wrinkles and thicker inner lip with a conical shell, ranging from 3.09 – 3.47 mm in length and 1.96 – 2.37 mm in width. The shell ranges from ovate to broadly conic and has no columella swelling. The periphery of the last whorl of the shell is evenly rounded with a closed umbilicus, indicated by a chink with width of 0.09 – 0.35 mm. Located on top of the tail, Beddomeia snails including Beddomeia hallae have an operculum, a horny or calcareous structure that seals the shell opening when it contracts. The only differences between genera Phrantela and Beddomeia are microscopic anatomical differences in the male and female reproductive organs. Beddomeia hallae differs to other Beddomeia in northern central Tasmania, excluding Beddomeia waterhouseae and Beddomeia lodderae for having a protoconch of two smooth whorls in relation to the shell and a thicker inner lip respectively.

== Distribution and Habitat ==
Map of Tasmania identifying distribution of Beddomeia hallae

Beddomeia hallae is known to exist in central, northern Tasmania in the tributaries of Buttons Rivulet, on South Preston Road, Nietta and the headwater streams of Castra Rivulet including Deep Gully Creek. They can be found on submerged wood, leaves, on weed and beneath stones, often feeding on periphyton, where they are sheltered and inaccessible. Although Beddomeia hallae exists within a relatively narrow range in an area of 20 km^{2} in only streams, the total length of stream where the species is found is unknown. Within the streams, the topography including large streams and inhospitable environments such as Eucalyptus nitens and Pinus radiata plantation and agricultural land clearing, split the subpopulations of this species. Beddomeia species including Beddomeia hallae have a narrow tolerance to changes in pH, water temperature, water flow, dissolved oxygen and conductivity in the environment, occurring only in stable situations. Freshwater hydrobiid snails rely on their habitat for survival including the local hydrological conditions such as rainfall, geology and non-aquatic environmental structure, so this demonstrates the importance of maintaining Beddomeia hallae's natural habitat in the long-term. Outside their immediate habitat, there is minimal ability for them to disperse and only limited instances for accidental dispersal to occur. Habitat, especially factors such as size of wetland vegetation and canopy near streams, the intrinsic behaviour of snails and proximity to other snail populations all influence dispersal success.

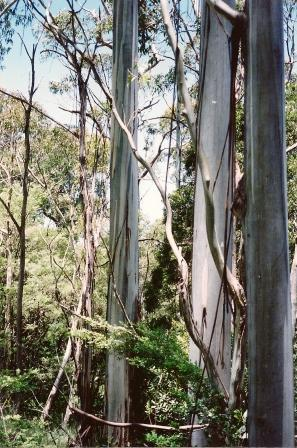
Eucalyptus nitens affecting Beddomeia hallae's habitat

Table 1. Population summary for Beddomeia hallae
	Location	Tenure	NRM region*	1:25 000 Map sheet	Year first seen	Year/(s) last seen	Extent of Subpopulation (ha)	Abundance
1	Buttons Rivulet	Private property	Cradle Coast	Castra	1982	2005, 2011	Unknown	Low
2	Tributary of Castra Rivulet	State forest	Cradle Coast	Castra	2001	2001 - 2004	Unknown	Medium
3	Tributary of Castra Rivulet	State forest	Cradle Coast	Castra	2001	2001 - 2004, 2012	Unknown	High
4	Tributary of Deep Gully Creek	State forest	Cradle Coast	Castra	2001	2001 - 2004	Unknown	Medium

* NRM region = Natural Resource Management region

== Ecology and Behaviour ==
=== Feeding ===
Gastropods are diverse feeders, in terms of the breadth of prey types they consume. Beddomeia hallae, like most freshwater gastropods, is micro-herbivorous, micro-omnivorous or possibly both. However, because of the small size and cryptic nature of this species, there is little known about the ecology and biology of hydrobiid snails even though their habitats and life-histories have been studied by scientists all over the world. Beddomeia hallae feeds by grazing on bacterial films, algae and diatoms. They feed on algae, detritus and periphyton off the surfaces of rocks using their teeth. Like most gastropods, Beddomeia hallae feeds using a variable sequence of food-finding movements, and then a succession of rhythmic movements, where the food is consumed. Movements in detecting food can often be affected by head and foot muscles, producing movements independent of feeding. During the feeding process, the olfactory system is important for snails in locating food, returning to their territory and in assessing the risks of predators.

=== Reproduction and Development ===
Beddomeia hallae can breed throughout the year, with no reproductive seasonal peak. The species slowly develops and reaches sexual maturity after 2 – 3 years and is believed to live for at least 5 years. Beddomeia hallae has separate female and male sexes. The female lays eggs into a dome-shaped capsule with a broad attachment base made of mainly white sand grains secreted together to the underside of rocks or wood, with each capsule containing a single egg. The young after birth undergo direct development, in which they forego metamorphosis and from the eggs, they develop as small crawling juveniles. In contrast to other aquatic molluscs with a free-swimming larval stage, this method of reproduction, taking into consideration their limited fertility and habitat requirements, results in the inability for this species to disperse widely. The inability for Beddomeia hallae to disperse into new habitat threatens the survival of this species.

== Conservation status ==
The Threatened Species Protection Act 1995 lists Beddomeia hallae to be one of the 37 Beddomeia species that are endangered, but on the International Union for Conservation of Nature (IUCN) Red List, the species is listed as vulnerable. However, this change to record Beddomeia hallae as endangered was only made in 2009 and in 1995, in the Threatened Species Protection Act 1995, it was recorded as rare. This occurred after a review, where Beddomeia hallae was found to meet the criteria for listing criterion B, specifically B1, being severely fragmented or existing at no more than 5 locations, and B2, continuing decline inferred, observed or projected and quality of habitat. In response to its threatened status as a species, a series of parliamentary Acts have been put forth to manage the protection of this species. This includes the Tasmania's Threatened Species Protection Act, 1995, which classifies more than 600 species of threatened plants and animals in Tasmania as either endangered, vulnerable or rare. Related to the Acts are strategic plans highlighting strategies and policies to be implemented such as Tasmania's Threatened Species Strategy, which was prepared in 2000. Although there are conservation measures such as the rules outlined in the Forest Practices Code, the effectiveness of species management is reduced because of a lack of knowledge surrounding species' life history attributes, habitat preferences and responses to disturbance.

== Threats to the Species ==
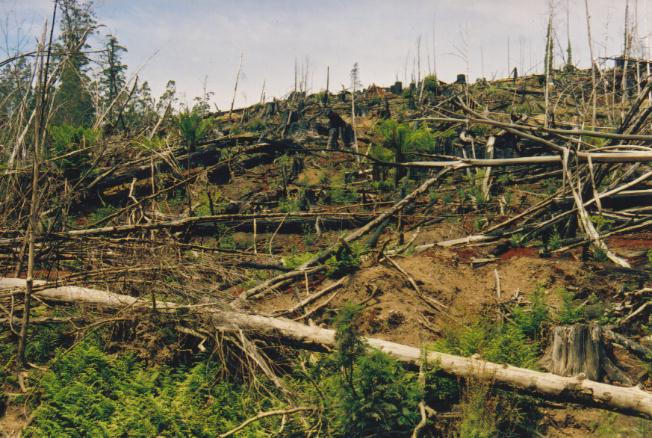
Forestry practices in Tasmania

Agricultural clearing, forestry practices, mining and impoundment construction threaten Beddomeia hallae's survival as a species, since this can result in habitat degradation or modification. For Beddomeia hallae, the main limiting factors are agricultural land practices and production forestry. Despite this, interspecific competition from introduced hydrobiids and climate change also affect the survival of Beddomeia hallae.

=== Habitat Disturbance ===
Pollution and modification to the natural system were found to be the most common threats affecting freshwater molluscs globally, ranking in the top two major threats for all biogeographical regions except for the Afrotropics. Building dams and other forms of construction are also a major threat to freshwater species like Beddomeia hallae. Chemicals can also have a large impact on freshwater molluscs, which are among most sensitive freshwater species to several chemicals. The habitat of Beddomeia hallae mainly consists of small order streams in unreserved environments, so they are at higher risk of exposure to habitat degradation and modification. Its habitat exists in remaining native riparian vegetation on cleared agricultural land, where access to domestic stock has a major impact on the surrounding environment. Beddomeia hallae exists in areas where anthropogenic disturbances occur such as over-exploitation of natural resources and habitat loss due to agricultural land use and production forestry, and for this reason, the species is vulnerable to habitat destruction and modification. Habitat conditions for Beddomeia hallae are further reduced in quality when riparian vegetation is removed, since this increases stream temperatures and siltation.

=== Interspecific Competition ===
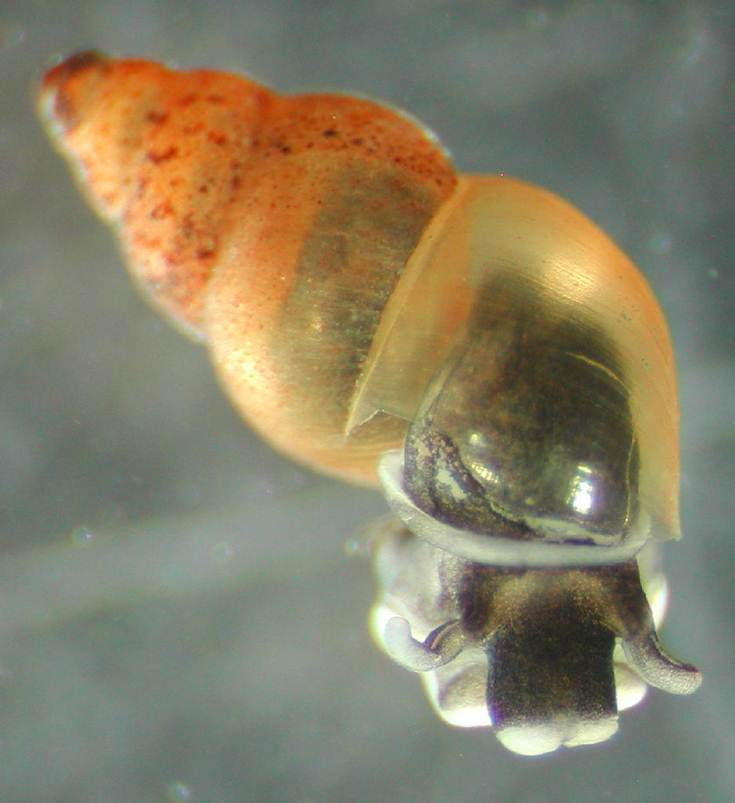
Potamopyrgus antipodarum: New Zealand hydrobiid snail

Beddomeia hallae consists of restricted subpopulations, so they are vulnerable to interspecific competition and displacement from Potamopyrgus antipodarum, a New Zealand hydrobiid, known to be an exotic introduced species. Potamopyrgus antipodarum has broad tolerances to environmental changes, an extensive diet and can efficiently disperse in lakes and streams. Beddomeia hallae exists in areas with water quality degradation, which the exotic species favours, hence the survival of Beddomeia hallae can be affected. Theoretically, it has been suggested that interspecific competition can affect the expansion of this species, in terms of speed and shape of range boundaries. Nonetheless, when predicting speed or success of expansion, competitive interactions are seldom taken into account. One of the reasons is that there is a lack of direct experimental evidence to demonstrate that competition affects speed or boundary shape of this expansion.

=== Climate Change ===
As the climate increasingly becomes warmer and precipitation fluctuates, this can impact on the Beddomeia hallae's habitat availability since it can reduce stream flow and affect riparian vegetation surroundings. Greenhouse gas emissions, as a result of human activities, catalyse climate change, threatening the survival and resilience of natural ecosystems and the biodiversity in those environments. Climate change will impact runoff regimes, water availability and average temperature in freshwater habitats due to increasing air temperatures resulting in warmer water temperatures. This is likely to affect the reproduction and growth rate of aquatic organisms including Beddomeia hallae. Warmer water contains less dissolved oxygen, reducing water quality, impacting organisms like Beddomeia hallae, which have a narrow tolerance to changes in water temperature and dissolved oxygen in the environment.

== Management of the Species ==
Management objectives use the precautionary principle in preventing the degradation or loss of habitat containing existing populations to manage the threatened status of the Beddomeia hallae species. These objectives include identifying where new subpopulations occur, improving the reservation status and increasing public awareness of this species. The precautionary principle has been used in management decisions made to protect this species where there is uncertainty or a lack of information on possible adverse effects. In practice, the precautionary principle suggests that where there is uncertainty in information available relating to possible adverse environmental effects, the environment should be favoured in the decision. The Listing Statement for Beddomeia hallae uses the precautionary principle, where the main objective for the management of the species is to reduce the risk of extinction, by protecting the habitat at known sites with existing populations, through adequate land management methods. Under the management objective of protecting the species' habitat, identifying where new subpopulations occur, by increasing the amount of information and data on the location, size and the state of known subpopulations is considered. To address reservation status, forming management agreements with land managers can reduce the deterioration of subpopulations. In protecting this species, raising awareness of Beddomeia hallae, by implementing hygiene practices for equipment used in and around waterways in local communities, can limit the movement of exotic snail species such as the Potamopyrgus antipodarum.

== See also ==
- List of non-marine molluscs of Australia
