= Beddomeia tumida =

Conservation status
- Critically endangered, possibly extinct (IUCN 3.1)

Scientific classification
- Kingdom: Animalia
- Phylum: Mollusca
- Class: Gastropoda
- Subclass: Caenogastropoda
- Order: Littorinimorpha
- Family: Tateidae
- Genus: Beddomeia
- Species: B. tumida

Binomial name
- Beddomeia tumida Petterd, 1889

Species of gastropod

Beddomeia tumida is a species of very small (4 4 mm (0.16 in)) freshwater snail that has a gill and an operculum. It is an aquatic operculate gastropod mollusc in the family Hydrobiidae, and is endemic to Australia.

It had not been spotted for 120 years and was listed by the IUCN as "critically endangered but possibly extinct", when in late 2021 one was found by researchers in yingina/Great Lake in the Central Plateau of Tasmania. A survey found 15 further snails.

== See also ==
- List of non-marine molluscs of Australia
