= Beddomeia =

Scientific classification
- Domain: Eukaryota
- Kingdom: Animalia
- Phylum: Mollusca
- Class: Gastropoda
- Subclass: Caenogastropoda
- Order: Littorinimorpha
- Superfamily: Truncatelloidea
- Family: Tateidae
- Genus: Beddomeia; Petterd, 1889

Type species
- Amnicola launcestonensis R. M. Johnston, 1879

Synonyms
- Petterdiana Brazier, 1896 (a junior synonym); Tasmaniella Ancey, 1898 (unnecessary nom. nov. pro Beddomeia Petterd, 1889, by Ancey believed to be preoccupied by Beddomea Nevill, 1878)

Genus of gastropods

Beddomeia is a genus of very small freshwater snails that have a gill and an operculum, aquatic operculate gastropod mollusks in the family Tateidae.

== Species ==
Species within the genus Beddomeia include:

- Beddomeia acheronensis
  - Beddomeia acheronensis absona
  - Beddomeia acheronensis acheronensis
- Beddomeia angulata Ponder & Clark, 1993
- Beddomeia averni Ponder & Clark, 1993
- Beddomeia bellii Petterd, 1889
- Beddomeia bowryensis Ponder & Clark, 1993
- Beddomeia briansmithi Ponder & Clark, 1993
- Beddomeia camensis Ponder & Clark, 1993
- Beddomeia capensis Ponder & Clark, 1993
- Beddomeia fallax Ponder & Clark, 1993
- Beddomeia forthensis Ponder & Clark, 1993
- Beddomeia franklandensis Ponder & Clark, 1993
- Beddomeia franklinensis Ponder & Clark, 1993
- Beddomeia fromensis Ponder & Clark, 1993
- Beddomeia fultoni Ponder & Clark, 1993
- Beddomeia gibba Ponder & Clark, 1993
- Beddomeia hallae Petterd, 1889
- Beddomeia hermansi Ponder & Clark, 1993
- Beddomeia hullii Petterd, 1889
- Beddomeia inflata Ponder & Clark, 1993
- Beddomeia kershawi Ponder & Clark, 1993
- Beddomeia kessneri Ponder & Clark, 1993
- Beddomeia krybetes Ponder & Clark, 1993
- Beddomeia launcestonensis (Johnston, 1879)
- Beddomeia lodderae Petterd, 1889
- Beddomeia mesibovi Ponder & Clark, 1993
- Beddomeia minima Petterd, 1889
- Beddomeia petterdi Ponder & Clark, 1993
- Beddomeia pallida Ponder & Clark, 1993
- Beddomeia paludinella Reeve, 1857
  - Beddomeia paludinella levenensis Ponder & Clark, 1993
  - Beddomeia paludinella paludinella Reeve, 1857
- Beddomeia phasianella Ponder & Clark, 1993
- Beddomeia protuberata Ponder & Clark, 1993
- Beddomeia ronaldi Ponder & Clark, 1993
- Beddomeia salmonis Ponder & Clark, 1993
- Beddomeia tasmanica (Tenison-Woods, 1876)
- Beddomeia topsiae Ponder & Clark, 1993
- Beddomeia trochiformis Ponder & Clark, 1993
- Beddomeia tumida Petterd, 1889
- Beddomeia turnerae Ponder & Clark, 1993
- Beddomeia waterhouseae Ponder & Clark, 1993
- Beddomeia wilmotensis Ponder & Clark, 1993
- Beddomeia wiseae Ponder & Clark, 1993
- Beddomeia zeehanensis Ponder & Clark, 1993
