= Posticobia norfolkensis =

Conservation status
- Extinct (IUCN 2.3)

Scientific classification
- Kingdom: Animalia
- Phylum: Mollusca
- Class: Gastropoda
- Subclass: Caenogastropoda
- Order: Littorinimorpha
- Family: Tateidae
- Genus: Posticobia
- Species: †P. norfolkensis

Binomial name
- †Posticobia norfolkensis (Sykes, 1900)

Extinct species of gastropod

Posticobia norfolkensis is an extinct species of freshwater snail, an aquatic gastropod mollusc in the family Tateidae. This species was endemic to Norfolk Island.
