= Beddomeia minima =

Conservation status
- Vulnerable (IUCN 3.1)

Scientific classification
- Kingdom: Animalia
- Phylum: Mollusca
- Class: Gastropoda
- Subclass: Caenogastropoda
- Order: Littorinimorpha
- Family: Tateidae
- Genus: Beddomeia
- Species: B. minima

Binomial name
- Beddomeia minima Petterd, 1889

Synonyms
- Beddomeia launcestonensis subsp. minima Petterd, 1889; Beddomeia minima Smith, 1992; Tasmaniella minima Iredale, 1943

Species of gastropod

Beddomeia minima is a population of freshwater snails that are endemic to Australia. It is commonly classified as a hydrobiid snail. This population was listed as Vulnerable on the IUCN Red List in 2011 due to its distribution being restricted to a single location and range of possible threats present in Tasmania. Beddomeia minima is one of a few fresh water snail species belonging to the same genus Beddomeia that survive in Tasmania, Australia, specifically a single location in the Scottsdale area.

== Taxonomy ==
The taxonomy of Beddomeia minima is not entirely clear because its original locality is not precise.

The relationship between Beddomeia minima and others of the same genus, Beddomeia, is not clear as its locality is not specific and material of this species have not been dissected.

In comparing the DNA of Beddomeia minima with others in the same family, some taxonomical uncertainty was revealed. It was found that a specimen with the genus Phrantela is the closest relative to this Beddomeia species.

Beddomeia minima share similar anatomical features with others in its taxonomical group. The coiled oviduct is oriented obliquely backwards and its bursal duct originates from the ventral side. The species have a small number of ctenidial filaments (usually less than 20) with a slightly arched rectum and a simple penis.

== Description ==
Beddomeia minima have small shells (1.7 - 3.7 mm in length), with a simple ovate-conic to broadly-conic and a thin inner lip and no columellar bulge. Their shells' periphery of the last whorl can be rounded, sub angled or angled. They are an aquatic operculate gastropod mollusc, meaning that they have a gill and an operculum. The width of the shell umbilicus of Beddomeia minima is variable (ranging from wide to small, or closed) and represented by a chink, and its aperture shape is typically ovate. The shell shape can range from compressed trochiform to conic, or subpupiform.

It is assumed that Beddomeia minima's egg capsules have a similar dome-shaped appearance, covered in grains of sand and other fragments, with a broad attachment base to other species of Beddomeia.

In this species of Beddomeia, the pallial vas deferens opens at the anterior end of the prostate gland. Additionally, the posterior part of the bursa copulatrix is adjacent to the seminal receptacle. The periostracumis thin and its colour ranges from colourless to yellow. The teleoconch of convex whorls ranged from 2.30 to 2.35, with a convexity ratio ranging from 0.18 to 0.24. The teleconch on Beddomeia minima have faint prosocline growth lines. The inner lip is thin with a medium width and absent columellar swelling. The outer lip have prosocline, with a medium umbilicus (width ranging between 0.25 – 0.35 mm).

In Beddomeia minima, the pallial tentacle is absent, with a narrow ctenidium that extends to almost the entire length of the pallial cavity and 13 to 17 filaments on the right of the central. The hypobranchial gland ranges from moderately developed to rather thick in some specimens and has a smooth surface. The rectum has a slight prominent arch and has faecal pellets that are longitudinally oriented. The renal organ doesn't extend into the pallial roof and the renal gland is circular and oriented with the long axis across its body. The pericardium is found with a short branchial vessel at the posterior end of the ctenidium.

The testis of Beddomeia minima take up 1.3 – 1.5 whorls and the seminal vesicle lies beneath the first whorl of testis behind the stomach. It is coiled over the stomach with some coils on the digestive gland. The prostate gland can be found on the 112 to 213 whorl in the pallial roof that can be broadly oval or compressed. The vas deferens ovens anteriorly and has few distinct undulations. The penis has a short distal end and simple, without a papilla. The medial section is close to parallel sided, short and broad. The penial duct is straight in the medial and basal sections with weak folds.

The ovaries of Beddomeia minima are simple and occupies 0.5 to 0.8 whorls. The coiled oviduct has a simple U shape with an initial bend that is obliquely backwards, with some connective tissue and a soft glandular appearance. It extends to the bursa copulatrix and the distal portion is straight. The bursa complex is a medium size and does not extend to the posterior pallial wall. The seminal receptacle pyriform is located at the posterior to the ventral edge. The capsule gland is of intermediate thickness and the genital opening is small and anterior to the capsule gland.

== Distribution and Habit ==
The known distribution of Beddomeia minima have been found to inhabit a singular small area on the north eastern part of Tasmania, specifically St. Patricks River in Scottsdale, and potentially in similar surrounding habitats (within a 170 km^{2} (66 sq mi) range). They are found in and around small streams and also under stones, pieces of wood, leaves and roots.

Beddomeia minima survive along with a variety of other hydrobiid species in a range of habitats including warm springs, rivers, streams, seepages and estuarine environments. The survival of the population is dependent on the maintenance of water quality and retention of protective vegetation.

== Ecology and Conservation ==
The species Beddomeia minima can only survive within a small margin of water quality. Due to their localised distribution, any changes in water quality in the St. Patricks River in Scottsdale, Tasmania, can pose a huge threat to this species. Hence, in the future, this species may experience a severe decline in population.

No behavioural traits have been found for this species.

The species is threatened by industrial agriculture and aquaculture (wood and pulp plantations), mining and quarrying, modifications to natural systems (Dams and water use) and pollution (urban and domestic waste water and industrial, military, agricultural and forestry effluents).

There is no species-specific conservation actions for this species.

== See also ==
- List of non-marine molluscs of Australia
