= Beddomeia hullii =

Conservation status
- Vulnerable (IUCN 2.3)

Scientific classification
- Kingdom: Animalia
- Phylum: Mollusca
- Class: Gastropoda
- Subclass: Caenogastropoda
- Order: Littorinimorpha
- Family: Tateidae
- Genus: Beddomeia
- Species: B. hullii

Binomial name
- Beddomeia hullii Petterd, 1889

Species of gastropod

Beddomeia hullii is a species of very small freshwater snail that has a gill and an operculum, an aquatic operculate gastropod mollusc in the family Hydrobiidae. This species is endemic to Australia.

== See also ==
- List of non-marine molluscs of Australia
