= Gibberula subbulbosa =

Scientific classification
- Kingdom: Animalia
- Phylum: Mollusca
- Class: Gastropoda
- Subclass: Caenogastropoda
- Order: Neogastropoda
- Family: Cystiscidae
- Subfamily: Cystiscinae
- Genus: Gibberula
- Species: G. subbulbosa

Binomial name
- Gibberula subbulbosa (Tate, 1878)

Synonyms
- Marginella subbulbosa Tate, 1878; Marginella beddomei Petterd, 1884; Phyloginella simplex Laseron, C. 1957

Species of gastropod

Gibberula subbulbosa, common name the toothed margin shell, is a species of sea snail, a marine gastropod mollusk, in the family Cystiscidae.

== Distribution ==
This marine species is endemic to Australia and occurs off New South Wales, Queensland, South Australia, Tasmania, Victoria, and Western Australia
