= Beddomeia waterhouseae =

Conservation status
- Vulnerable (IUCN 3.1)

Scientific classification
- Kingdom: Animalia
- Phylum: Mollusca
- Class: Gastropoda
- Subclass: Caenogastropoda
- Order: Littorinimorpha
- Family: Tateidae
- Genus: Beddomeia
- Species: B. waterhouseae

Binomial name
- Beddomeia waterhouseae Ponder & Clark, 1993

Species of gastropod

Beddomeia waterhouseae, also known as Claytons Rivulet freshwater snail, is a species of freshwater snail in the family Tateidae. This species is endemic to northern Tasmania in Australia. The holotype specimen was found in a very small tributary of Little Clayton's Rivulet and is held at the Australian Museum. B. waterhouseae is small and as an adult has a shell measuring between 1.7 and 3.7 mm in length. The shell shape is ovate-conic to broadly conic and has a thin inner lip and no columellar bulge. This species feeds on algae and detritus on rocks. The female of the species lay single eggs in capsules made of sand grains and attached to the underside of rocks or wood. B. waterhouseae is considered vulnerable by the IUCN as it has a very small range and is sensitive to water quality and so may be threatened by disturbances of its habitat. Other threats include habitat loss. Conservation activities such as assessment of the aquatic ecosystem and vegetal surveys are being undertaken in an attempt to preserve this species.

== Description ==
B. waterhouseae belongs to the family Tateidae (previously to the family Hydrobiidae) and is endemic to Australia and northern Tasmania in particular. Although its habitat and physical appearance are similar to those of the hundreds of other freshwater snail species, specific aspects of its morphology and ecology distinguish B. waterhouseae from other species in the Beddomeia genus of freshwater snails.

Distinguishing features include its small shells. Adult individuals measure 1.7 to 3.7 millimetres (0.067 to 0.146 in) in length, most shorter than 3.5 millimetres (0.14 in). Its shell is simple, ovate-conic to broadly conic. B. waterhouseae's shell appears with a thin inner lip and no columellar bulge. Although it has a thin shell, the outer lip evenly curves into the suture. Peripheral elements of their shell morphology include the rounded shell of the last whorl, subangled or angled.

As with all other species of Beddomeia, B. waterhouseae is geographically isolated. It does not appear in any other habitat than their original natural environment in northern Tasmania, limiting their range. In fact, B. waterhouseae's distribution does not extend much further than a small tributary of Little Clayton's Rivulet. Due to their restricted ranges, their conservation, protection and survival are prioritized under Australian Terrestrial and Freshwater Mollusca conservation practices.

Some of the differences in shell characters between B. waterhouseae and similar species including B. lodderae and B. forthensis is that B. lodderae is slightly shouldered at the suture. Its umbilicus is narrowly open and the chink less distinct than that of B. waterhouseae, which has a thinner and narrower inner lip. B. forthensis is generally smaller, even thinner and has fewer whorls.

== Taxonomy ==
This species was described by Winston Ponder and G.A. Clark in 1993. The holotype specimen was collected in a small tributary of Little Clayton's Rivulet. It is held at the Australian Museum.

Beddomeia is the largest genus in Tateidae with 42 species that occur mainly across the northern third of Tasmania. Many species, including B. waterhouseae, are threatened because of their very small geographic ranges, usually a single site like a small stream or seep. Many species may have evolved in different areas because each is very selective in their habitat and has no means of dispersal, by physical vectors or a structural sense. They remain cryptic in their habits and shelter in areas relatively inaccessible to humans, such as under rock slabs.

B. waterhouseae is highly intolerant to disturbances, so human factors contribute to its vulnerable conservation status. It feeds on algae and detritus on rock surfaces by rasping using radula. This species is separated into male and female sexes. Female individuals only lay single eggs into a capsule usually made of sand grains that are attached under rocks or wood. Small crawling juveniles then emerge from these eggs and later turn into freshwater snail.

== Identification and ecology ==
As with most freshwater molluscs (including slugs, snails, and mussels), B. waterhouseae can be identified by their proximity to water, as they live around streams. Due to their small range, B. waterhouseae can be identified to be close to others snails, surrounding small streams, mostly but not fully inside water, such as lakes. In fact, only one species of freshwater snails in Australia, B. tumida, survives exclusively in lakes.

Many Beddomeia species are endangered. Their survival relies on the maintenance of good water quality. Human interaction contributes to the threat against B. waterhouseae and other freshwater snails. In addition to water pollution, habitat degradation, whether anthropogenic or natural, also contributes its population decline.

== Conservation status ==
Different levels of conservation status for organisms and wildlife are in place to ensure the needed attention and care for endangered or threatened species. B. waterhouseae falls under the "endangered" status, meaning a recovery plan is in process with discussions taking place based on the reservation of the species.

B. waterhouseae is endangered due to habitat loss from factors including the short range of their habitat (ranging only a few kilometres) and too frequent encounters with humans, as development continues to bring humans into their habitat. Although governments and organizations have discussed and are aware of the conservation of this species, no active processes of interference and conduction of reservation plans has happened. Many species are situated on a level of "emergency" in their conservation status, and as resources and funding are scarce, no simultaneous action can be taken for all endangered species in Australia.

== Conservation ==
With funding from the Australian government and as listed in the Commonwealth Environment Protection and Biodiversity Conservation Act 1999, protection and conservation of Australian flora and fauna, including all Beddomeia species, are a statewide priority. Single and multi-species Recovery Plans have been formulated. The Conservation Act 1999 lists over 600 species. Yet, the lack of resources and funding means that action cannot be taken to protect all of these species simultaneously.

The conservation of B. waterhouseae has been questioned, speculated and brought to attention of all local, state governments and other organizations. Although no specific actions are stipulated, it is expected that implementation of the Recovery Plan will take place through the three NRM Tasmanian Regions amongst other governments and organizations.

The NRMs have discussed three methods of approach when it comes to the preservation of such species. These include:

- a consistent approach, whereby it is necessary for all regions to continually acknowledge the variety of approaches of reservation depending on each species
- transparency, involving being aware of the need for justification and accountability for the decisions made, including the prioritization of a specific Beddomeia species based on their level of extinction, always being aware of the possibility of extinction
- being up-to-date, meaning a lot of species still lack recovery plans, while others have been overlooked, or have too many resources and time spent on them

== Aquatic ecosystems ==
Proposed development and human influences are the main threats to B. waterhouseae. Aquatic ecosystems have been initially assessed with the aim of identifying any significant ecosystem values (species, communities and habitat) that may be impacted by proposed development, both within the reservoir areas and downstream. A safe native environment is key to the survival of organisms, so studying the natural features that sustain life and in turn debating how human influence will alter those is key to ensuring the survival of these species.

The Tasmanian Government has provided a consolidating legislation for the protection of native Tasmanian species. In this legislation, some of the main natural environments are studied and outlined. Native environments need to have fairly good sustainability conditions. Most contain a high diversity of native fauna and some exotic species, including B. waterhouseae. Specific attributes that formulate a sustainable environment for the survival of natural organisms such as B. waterhouseae include aquatic fauna and habitats not containing any threatened species. This suggests that overall the natural environment can sustain life and contributes to the safety of native organisms such as freshwater snail species.

The Boobyalla and Tomahawk Rivers are both native Tasmanian environments that are home so hundreds of species, and these are in fairly good condition in terms of their contribution to the high survival rate of organisms. B. waterhouseae is found in this area of Tasmania. An endangered species choosing to make this part of natural Tasmania their home further proves the sustainability of it. The Boobyalla and Tomahawk Rivers have an elevation of 7 metres (23 ft). They are engulfed in green, brown and natural sounds coming from the thousands of organisms located there. These rivers are open to the public, meaning anyone can visit these at any time, which tends to often be a threat to the survival of the natural organisms there. However, overall, there have been minimal direct negative interactions between fauna and humans so far.

== Vegetation assessments ==
Vegetation assessments have taken place in areas that do not foster B. waterhouseae or any other organisms to determine the reasons for these environments' inability to house to living organisms. This has taken place through incorporating a review of relevant literature, databases and vegetation maps, aerial photograph interpretation and a field survey. The purpose of these environment assessments is to identify if B. waterhouseae or any other significant species or communities might be impacted by any proposed development.

Fauna assessment was able to assess the structure and quality of life including conditions of habitats of B. waterhouseae. Fauna assessments results concluded that vegetation in the study areas is potential habitat for only four species listed as threatened on the Environmental Protection and Biodiversity Act 1999. It is not possible to determine the actual significance of project impacts on the ability of organisms such as B. waterhouseae to survive, particularly long term. Further surveys are underway to see if these proposed human influences directly affect missing species from these habitats.

== See also ==
- List of non-marine molluscs of Australia
