= Bonhamaropa tarravillensis =

Conservation status
- Near Threatened (IUCN 2.3)

Scientific classification
- Kingdom: Animalia
- Phylum: Mollusca
- Class: Gastropoda
- Order: Stylommatophora
- Family: Charopidae
- Genus: Bonhamaropa
- Species: B. tarravillensis

Binomial name
- Bonhamaropa tarravillensis (Gabriel, 1930)

Synonyms
- Allocharopa tarravillensis (Gabriel, 1930); Charopa tarravillensis Gabriel, 1930

Species of gastropod

Bonhamaropa tarravillensis is a species of very small air-breathing land snails, terrestrial pulmonate gastropod mollusks in the family Charopidae. This species is endemic to Australia.
