= Alvania limensis =

Scientific classification
- Kingdom: Animalia
- Phylum: Mollusca
- Class: Gastropoda
- Subclass: Caenogastropoda
- Order: Littorinimorpha
- Superfamily: Rissooidea
- Family: Rissoidae
- Genus: Alvania
- Species: A. limensis

Binomial name
- Alvania limensis (Ponder & Worsfold, 1994)

Synonyms
- Manzonia (Alvinia) limensis Ponder & Worsfold, 1994 (basionym)

Species of gastropod

Alvania limensis is a species of small sea snail, a marine gastropod mollusk or micromollusk in the family Rissoidae.

== Description ==
The length of the shell attains 2 mm.

== Distribution ==
This species occurs in the Pacific Ocean off Peru and Southern Chile.
