= Beddomeia mesibovi =

Conservation status
- Vulnerable (IUCN 3.1)

Scientific classification
- Kingdom: Animalia
- Phylum: Mollusca
- Class: Gastropoda
- Subclass: Caenogastropoda
- Order: Littorinimorpha
- Family: Tateidae
- Genus: Beddomeia
- Species: B. mesibovi

Binomial name
- Beddomeia mesibovi Ponder & Clark, 1993

Species of gastropod

Holotype (AM C165847)site: near Kanunnah Bridge, Tasmania

Beddomeia mesibovi is a species of very small freshwater snail that has a gill and an operculum, an aquatic operculate gastropod mollusk in the family Tateidae. It was first described in 1993.

This species is endemic to Tasmania, where it is known only from its type locality.

== See also ==
- List of non-marine molluscs of Australia
