= Beddomeia krybetes =

Conservation status
- Vulnerable (IUCN 2.3)

Scientific classification
- Kingdom: Animalia
- Phylum: Mollusca
- Class: Gastropoda
- Subclass: Caenogastropoda
- Order: Littorinimorpha
- Family: Tateidae
- Genus: Beddomeia
- Species: B. krybetes

Binomial name
- Beddomeia krybetes Ponder & Clark, 1993

Species of gastropod

Beddomeia krybetes is a species of very small freshwater snail that has a gill and an operculum, an aquatic operculate gastropod mollusk in the family Tateidae. It was first described in 1993 by Winston Ponder, G.A. Clark, Alison Miller and A Toluzzi.

This species is endemic to Tasmania, and known only from its type locality, where it is found in freshwater under large, stable rocks where the stream has a strong flow.

== See also ==
- List of non-marine molluscs of Australia
