= Beddomeia camensis =

Conservation status
- Vulnerable (IUCN 3.1)

Scientific classification
- Kingdom: Animalia
- Phylum: Mollusca
- Class: Gastropoda
- Subclass: Caenogastropoda
- Order: Littorinimorpha
- Family: Tateidae
- Genus: Beddomeia
- Species: B. camensis

Binomial name
- Beddomeia camensis Ponder & Clark, 1993

Species of gastropod

Beddomeia camensis is a species of very small freshwater snail that is endemic to Australia. The invertebrate is 2–4 mm in size, it is a gastropod mollusk and belongs to the Hydrobiidae family, a large family of freshwater snails recognised by their small size and cosmopolitan distribution. Beddomeia camensis is one of the least populated species within its family distributed across only 5 small to medium-sized streams that flow into the Cam River catchment in North-West Tasmania.

Due to its minute declining population, Beddomeia camensis is listed as endangered under the Threatened Species Act 1995 and vulnerable under the IUCN Red List. The population has struggled historically due to its limited fecundity and specific habitat requirements which, in turn, have limited the species ability to disperse into new habitats and establish a growing population. Furthermore, in more recent years, the negative impacts of agricultural clearing, forestry, mining and impoundment construction have further impended on the population of the endangered species.

== Classification ==
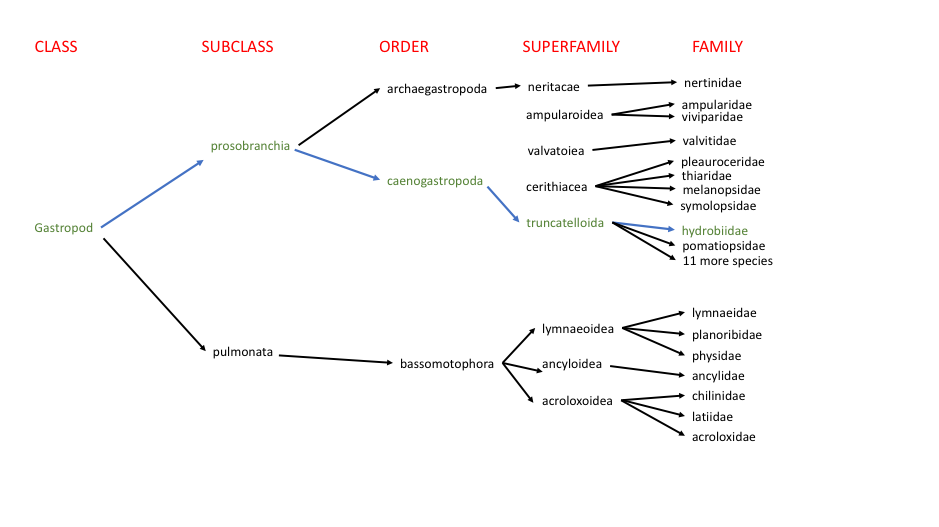
Family Tree of Beddomeia Camensis

Beddomeia Camensis is a gastropod, belonging to the Prosobranchia subclass, Caenogastropoda order, Truncatelloidea superfamily and the Hydrobiidae family, a family of freshwater snails that consists of over 100 genera. The Hydrobiid is one of the largest families belonging to the truncatelloidea superfamily of small sized aquatic snails, containing an extensive fossil record dating back to the Early Carboniferous. Hydrobiid species can be found all over the world, making their distribution cosmopolitan. Hydrobiids are distributed worldwide most notably in southern parts of Europe, Africa, America and New Zealand. Australia alone is inhabited by 200 species from this family, populating most densely in South Eastern parts of the country. The habitual distribution of species varies between estuarine mudflats, mangroves, mountain lakes, caves, creeks, rivers and subterranean groundwater.

Taking a broader look at classification, Beddomeia camensis belongs to the Class Gastropod, comprising over 65,000 species, making it the largest within the phylum Molusca. This class is made up of a large collection of invertebrates including both snails and slugs. Gastropods are amongst the few groups of animals that have successfully survived in the ocean, fresh waters and land. While distribution ranges between these three major habitats, only 5000 species live in freshwater.

== Appearance ==
Many species of freshwater snail within the Hydrobiidae family are difficult to distinguish between based on appearance. The size range between Hydrobiids is 1-7mm, placing them on the smaller side of the Gastropod class. Shells in this family typically take the appearance of a white or brown to opaque colour with varying thickness from a thin to fairly solid structure. Patterns or 'whorls' on the shell vary from a dextrally coiled appearance to planispiral averaging 2-8 whorls.

In regards to appearance, Beddomeia Camensis is fairly 'average' within Hydrobiidae family. It has a gill, an operculum and a shell. The size varies between 2–4 mm and the shell typically ranges in colour from dark brown to opaque. The shell is 2.93-3.68 mm long, 2.15-2.51 mm wide with protoconch of 1.75mm whorls. Beddomeia Camensis' poses conical to compressed trochiform shells that have between 4 and 8 whorls. Beddomeia Camensis' are not sexually dimorphic in shape, meaning that, based on appearance, a male cannot be distinguished from a female. Gender can only be distinguished by their reproductive organs which are microscopic.

== Distribution ==
Map of Tasmania identifying location of Beddomeia camensis

The Hydrobiidae family can be characterised by its 'cosmopolitan' distribution, meaning that is essentially locatable almost anywhere in the world. This family is locatable in freshwater habitats only, however, Gastropods as a class are widely spread through marine and land environments as well. Marine and land species account for 93% of the Gastropod class population meaning that freshwater species' make up only 7%. This is due to the fact that snails and slugs are better adapted to marine and land environments. As a result of this, some species of Hydrobiidae, such as Beddomeia camensis, are limited to a small selection of freshwater environments that can sufficiently support their life.

Evidently, the distribution of Beddomeia Camensis' is limited to only 5 small to medium-sized streams that flow in the cam river catchment on Oonah Road in Northwest Tasmania (shown in the map on the right). This area in total covers only a 7 km radius. They can be found on small allochthonous material including leaf litter, woody debris and rocks in the stream channels. They typically will resign on the underside of this material where there is moisture and, more importantly, protection from direct contact with elements such as rain, wind and sun.

== Anatomy and Reproduction ==
Over 30,000 species of Gastropods are suited to marine environments and only 5000 to freshwater. This is due to the fact that marine environments are better suited for reproduction and dispersal. Marine Gastropods are aided by the flow of waves, currents and tides which evenly distribute offspring, whereas, in freshwater environments, movement can only be 'downstream'. As a result, the success and strength of populations within the Hydrobiidae family has been characterised largely by a unique reproductive adaptation. Some freshwater snails (mainly within the pulmonata subclass) are Hermaphrodites, meaning they have adapted the ability to self-fertilize which, in turn, allows a species to maintain population growth individually. This adaptation, however, has been possessed by very few species within the prosobranchia subclass, to which Beddomeia Camensis belongs.

Beddomeia Camensis' are not hermaphrodites and, therefore, reproduce through sexual reproduction between a male and a female. The females lay eggs that range from 0.87-1.03mm in length which is 30% of the average adult body size. Interestingly, eggs develop into fully grown juvenile size before emerging from the shell, a unique characteristic for Gastropods. This adaptation utilises the ideal growing conditions within the egg, being a warm, moist and protected environment

The visual system possessed by Beddomeia Camensis' is called lens eyes. Outlined by Britanica, "Relative to pinhole eyes, lens eyes have greatly improved resolution and image brightness." The form of locomotion adopted by the snail is called mucus mediated gliding, defined by EOL as "muscular waves propelling an animal over a mucus layer overlaying the substrate; alternating regions of muscular contraction and expansion create traveling waves that shear the mucus, resulting in translation of the animal."

== Threats to population ==
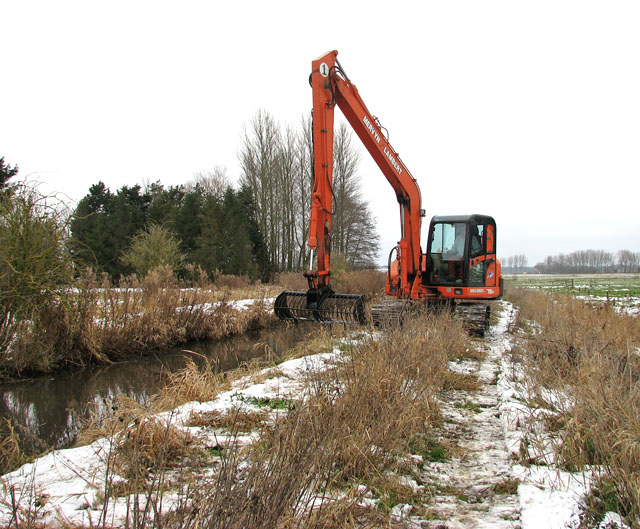
Example of side stream land clearing

The limited distribution of Beddomeia camensis is not only due to its limited fecundity but also due to a number of human induced activities that, in combination with natural threats to the population, have led to the species becoming endangered. Unfortunately, this is a widely spread issue amongst the genus with beddomeia camensis being 1 of 37 beddomeia species listed as threatened or endangered under the Tasmanian Threatened Species Protection act. Naturally, this occurs due to its limited fecundity, as mentioned previously. Fecundity represents a species "potential reproductive output" through the lifetime of an individual organism. Fecundity is closely related with fertility, yet it differs in the following way. Fertility covers the natural ability to produce offspring while fecundity focuses on the potential for reproduction. As a result, fecundity plays a vital role in the regulation of population size. In the case of Beddomeia Camensis, while fertility of females and males is not problematic, fecundity is amongst females, acting as a key natural resistant to mass population growth and distribution. In addition to fecundity, another natural pressure that has grown more prevalent in the last few centuries has been competition from Potamopyrgus antipodarum, a species native to New Zealand, recently introduced to Tasmania.

On top of these factors, that already lead to moderately high vulnerability in the species, Beddomeia camensis has been further pressured by human imposed threats including agricultural and livestock clearing, forestry, mining and impoundment construction. Agricultural clearing includes the clearing and burning of sidestream vegetation and replacement with agriculture or livestock. In regards to river catchments such as the Cam River, side stream vegetation is a vital natural defence mechanism that offers protection against sediment pollution and control over soil erosion. In the circumstance of agriculture, chemicals such as pesticides in addition to increased erosion and runoff into the river catchments which alters nutrient levels in the environment. In extreme cases this can lead to the outbreak of toxic algae in the streams. Stock grazing can further intensify this effect as grazing directly removes side stream vegetation and vastly increases erosion, due to the movements of livestock.

== Responses and solutions to threats ==
In regards to managing the threatened population of Beddomeia camensis, the primary objective is to preserve and maintain the integrity of the natural habitat. As mentioned in the previous section, the most significant overarching threat to the population is loss of habitat due to agricultural and livestock clearing, forestry, mining and impoundment construction. While it is not economically viable to stop these practices, there are ways in which these can continue without compromising the wellbeing of the freshwater snails habitat. Methods of protecting side stream vegetation include fencing to reduce foot traffic and grazing from cattle, stock watering points that allow cattle to drink from the river in select areas deemed suitable for stock access and rehabilitation where severe damage has already occurred.

Ultimately, for these actions to gain the momentum they require, there will need to be an increase in the information available surrounding the species. With this information, relevant Natural Resource Management committees, local councils and government agencies will be equipped with the knowledge and research required initiate actions that lead to preservation. By improving the legislative preservation status of the species, agreements can then be made with local land owners and farmers to better protect the Cam River catchments.

Sufficient information gathering on Beddomeia Camensis will be achieved through further more thorough research into the species. This will reveal more detail surrounding information such as population size, distribution, ecological requirements and the direct impact of natural and anthropogenic threats to the population. In addition to professional research, the Tasmanian Threatened Species Link also requests any observations made by members of the community living in the area.

See also

- List of non-marine molluscs of Australia
