= Beddomeia phasianella =

Conservation status
- Vulnerable (IUCN 2.3)

Scientific classification
- Kingdom: Animalia
- Phylum: Mollusca
- Class: Gastropoda
- Subclass: Caenogastropoda
- Order: Littorinimorpha
- Family: Tateidae
- Genus: Beddomeia
- Species: B. phasianella

Binomial name
- Beddomeia phasianella Ponder & Clark, 1993

Species of gastropod

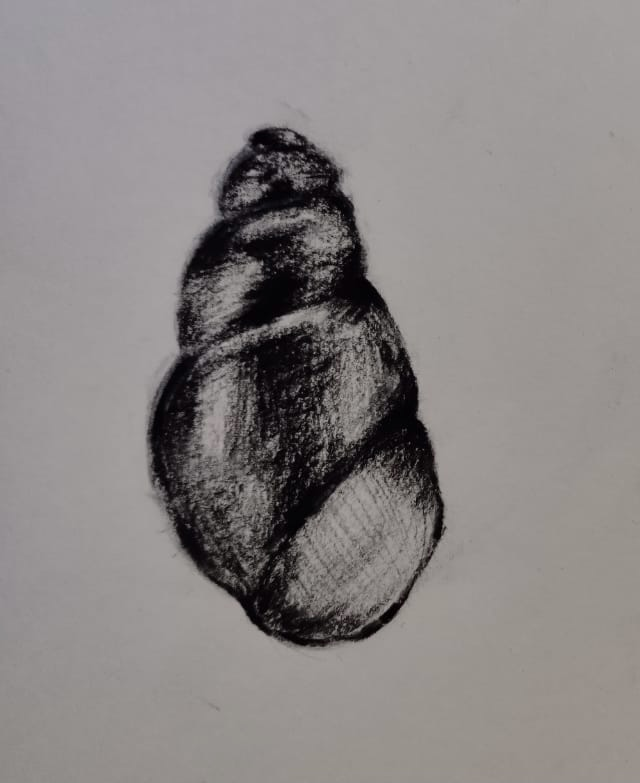
Beddomeia phasianella

Beddomeia phasianella is a species of snail in the family Tateidae. It is a very small freshwater snail that has a gill and an operculum, an aquatic operculate gastropod mollusk. This species is endemic to Tasmania.

== Characteristics ==
The elongate shell of Beddomeia phasianella is comparatively smaller than other species of Beddomeia. It has a length of 1.87-2.25mm and a width of 1.15-1.33mm. The Teleoconch (adult shell) has around 2.6-3.4 convex whorls, the shell is consistently rounded at the edge of the last whorl and has faint growth lines towards the helicocone. The periostracum (the outermost layer) of the shell is yellow in color. On the other hand, the protoconch (larva stage shell) has roughly 1.75 whorls, it is covered with faint spiral and axial wrinkles, and exhibit medial indication of pustules.

== Threats ==
For threat and conservation information, see:

- Ponder, Winston Frank; Keith F. Walker (2003). "From Mound Springs to Mighty Rivers: The conservation Status of Freshwater Molluscs in Australia". Aquatic Ecosystem Health and Management. 6 (1): 19–28. doi:10.1080/14634980301482. Wikidata Q61440601.

== See also ==
- List of non-marine molluscs of Australia
