= Penescosta =

Scientific classification
- Kingdom: Animalia
- Phylum: Mollusca
- Class: Gastropoda
- Order: Stylommatophora
- Family: Charopidae
- Genus: Penescosta; Iredale, 1944

Genus of gastropods

Penescosta is a genus of small air-breathing land snails, terrestrial pulmonate gastropod mollusks in the family Charopidae.

== Species ==
Species within the genus Pentescosta include:

- Penescosta mathewsi
- Penescosta sororcula
