= Beddomeia fultoni =

Conservation status
- Vulnerable (IUCN 2.3)

Scientific classification
- Kingdom: Animalia
- Phylum: Mollusca
- Class: Gastropoda
- Subclass: Caenogastropoda
- Order: Littorinimorpha
- Family: Tateidae
- Genus: Beddomeia
- Species: B. fultoni

Binomial name
- Beddomeia fultoni Ponder & Clark, 1993

Species of gastropod

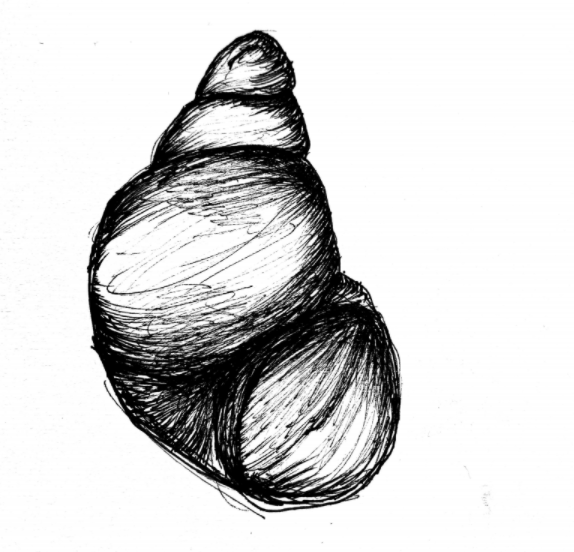
Scientific sketch of Beddomeia fultoni found in Tasmania

Beddomeia fultoni (B. fultoni) is a species of small freshwater snail belonging to the family Tateidae.

The species is endemic to Australia. Commonly known as Farnhams Creek hydrobiid snail, the species used to belong to the family Hydrobiidae sensu lato (s.l.) and is listed as one of 37 threatened Beddomeia species on the Tasmanian Threatened Species Protection Act 1995.

Found within north-western Tasmania, the species has a somewhat small range. Previously, they have only been identified in sites within six different streams which are separated by a maximum of 4 km. A large portion of the Beddomeia species, including B. fultoni fall into the category of narrow-range endemic species. These narrow-range taxa are generally poorly reserved due to limitations caused by small distributions, size, mobility, biogeographical boundaries and highly specific habitat requirements. Habitat disturbance from agricultural and domestic land use, climate change and invasive species are currently the principal threats contributing to the vulnerability of the species.

== Taxonomy ==
Freshwater Mollusca can be divided into two classes, the bivalves (mussels, clams and pea shells and the gastropods (snails). These two classes differ significantly in physical appearance, biology and ecology but are grouped due to similarities found between body plans.

The Hydrobiidae family, in which used to belong the Beddomeia genus and Beddomeia fultoni species, is the most diverse group of the taxonomic subclass Caenogastropoda and has over 267 known species. The Beddomeia complex can be separated into found distinct genera; These genera include Beddomeia, Phrantela, Nanocochlea and Victodrobia. Of the 67 species that belong within the Beddomeia complex, 47 of these species are of the Beddomeia genus. This genus is endemic and restricted to Tasmania and occupies the northern areas of the state.

Within this clade the family Planorbidae is the next largest with about 40 species. Approximately half of the known hydrobiids are located in Tasmania, however, speciose faunas occur in south-eastern Australia and in the Great Artesian Basin. While some Hydrobiids have widespread and abundant populations, others, like B. fultoni are restricted to singular streams where genetic divergences occur within the same habitat.

== Description ==
Hydrobiid snails are often around 1.0 -7.0 mm in length and often have smooth shells that can be opaque to a darker brown in colour. B. fultoni has a shell that is 3.07-3.78 mm in length and 2.24 – 2.78 mm in width and have a protoconch of approximately 1.5 whorls. The umbilicus of the shell is not sexually dimorphic and is either very small or closed and is characterized by 0.16-0.39mm wide chink.

Due to their small size and cryptic nature, information surrounding the ecology and biology of hydrobiid snails is relatively limited. At a species level, the identification of hydrobiids and other closely related families can be challenging. Distinguishing factors include a number of defined anatomical and shell characteristics, however, in more recent times a move from morphological taxonomy has seen a rise in the use of allozyme electrophoresis and DNA-based techniques for species identification. A study conducted in 2005 used a variety of Tasmanian species, including Pseudotricula, Nanocochlea, Austropyrgus and Beddomeia species in order to phylogenetically analyse the subterranean genera and is currently the only reported sequencing of Beddomeia species. Due to high variability within each species of the Beddomeia family, certain morphological traits are referred to as 'plastic'. These traits and characteristics are also convergent as multiple similarities can be seen between two or more species and therefore, cannot reliably be used as a direct indication of species.

B. fultoni co-exist with some species of Austropyrgus which may cause confusion due to similar appearances. However, B. fultoni can usually be identified by the absence of operculum peg, a characteristic not appearing on any Beddomeia species.

== Distribution and habitat ==
Patterns of high diversity are generally presented by gastropods with increasing species richness and increasing endemicity at lower latitudes. However, an exception of this is Tasmania, which holds the most diverse freshwater fauna in Australia. Through the use of anatomical traits to investigate speciation within a hydrobiid complex located in south-eastern Australia, 67 hydrobiid species were classified by Ponder et al. and the Beddomeia complex was categorised into four genera; three of which (Beddomeia, Phrantela and Nanocochlea) are endemic to Tasmania, with Victoria being the sole habitat of the fourth genus, Victodrobia . There is a minimal geographical separation between these four genera particularly between the morphologically similar Austropyrgus and Nanocochlea and the supposedly closely related Beddomeia and Phrantela genera. The B.fultoni species can be described as cryptic in habitat due to the tendency to be located within environments within small and large streams of low hydrological variation.

B. fultoni is geographically restricted to the Montagu catchment in north-western Tasmania, where it has been located within the headwater tributaries of Fixters and Farnhams creeks. Within Fixters Creek the species is generally found on roots, wood, leaves and stones at Farnhams Creek. B.fultoni have only been identified within only 6 different streams with a maximum of 4 km separating these sites, revealing the extremely narrow range of the species. This can be seen in Table 1, a population summary for Beddomeia fultoni assembled by K. Richards. Currently, the length of stream that the species occurs in unknown; however, inhospitable environments downstream of these catchments, caused by factors such as intensive dairy production, limit further radiation. Inhospitable environments such as wide streams, areas with high levels of agricultural development, production forestry, and domestic residences further separate subpopulations occurring within these catchments.

Species such as B.fultoni which exhibit small ranges of distribution do so as a result of limitation by size, dispersal capabilities and mobility. Historical biogeographical obstructions often determine the small ranges of species, however for those with minimal dispersal capabilities, migration between suitable habitats is significantly hindered. The presence of substances such as root mates, various substrates, CWD, and detritus have been associated with the occurrence of B. fultoni within its known habitats.

Table 1. Population summary for Beddomeia fultoni
	Location	Tenure	NRM region *	1:25 000 Mapsheet	Year Last (first) Seen	Extent of Subpopulation (ha)	Abundance
1	Farnhams Creek, on the Bass Highway, west of Christmas Hills	Private Property	Cradle Coast	Togari	1989	unknown	Low
2	Tributary of Fixters Creek, north end of Brittons Swamp	State Forest	Cradle Coast	Togari	1989	unknown	Low
3	Tributary of Fixters Creek, southern end of Brittons Swamp	State Forest	Cradle Coast	Togari	2006	unknown	Low
4	Tributary of Fixters Creek, central Brittons Swamp (informal reserve)	State Forest	Cradle Coast	Togari	2010	unknown	Moderate
5	Tributary of Fixters Creek, central Brittons Swamp (informal reserve)	State Forest	Cradle Coast	Togari	2010	unknown	High
6	Tributary of Farnhams Creek, off Riseborough Road, Togari State Forest	State Forest	Cradle Coast	Mella	2010	unknown	Low

* NRM region = Natural Resource Management region

== Conservation and threats ==
In 1995 Beddomeia fultoni was listed as rare on the Tasmanian Threatened Species protection Act 1995. In 2009 this status was elevated to endangered due to the species meeting the listing criterion for in two sections of criterion B. This includes criterion B1, as the species distribution is extremely fragmented and has been identified at no more than 5 locations and B2, as the species has a shown that a continuous population decline could be observed, inclined or projected due to occurrence and quality of habitat. Species are regarded as endangered when factors that have contributed to its decline continue to operate in the same manner and minimise the long-term chances of the species' survival prospects.

Key factors that have been identified as threats to B.fultoni and other Beddomeia species include habitat modification and destruction, interspecific competition from introduced species, climate change and stochastic effects.

=== Habitat disturbance ===
Areas within North-Western Tasmania have been targeted for agricultural development and intensive vegetable production due to the deep ferrosols, including deep basalt soils, present. As a result, B.fultoni are highly vulnerable to anthropogenic habitat destruction and modification. Habitat suitability for B.fultoni is reduced by increases to stream temperatures as a result of the permanent removal of riparian vegetation. Retention of this riparian vegetation within hydrobiid habitats is a crucial factor in the survival of these populations and in terms of conservation, forestry, agricultural and mining activities have shown to have negatively impacted these areas. These damages are yet to be quantified however, it is predicted that a range from short to long term effects will be observed, with some being permanent. Currently the effectiveness of various riparian buggers are being investigated and reviewed in order to limit the impacts on water quality and ecology in areas that are subject to anthropogenic disruption. Without intervention, it is predicted that by the year 2100, human land-use alteration will have the greatest global impact on biodiversity, followed by more popularised events such as climate change and nitrogen deposition.

=== Climate change ===
Alongside invasive species, climate change is one of the greatest biodiversity threats and is expected to provoke or contribute to the extinction of many species such as B. fultoni in the future. As a result of increased global temperatures, predictions of increased rainfall, along with severe storm and flooding events, create major concern for freshwater populations. These events decrease habitat availability and often contribute to the modification of riparian vegetation communities. Other factors caused by climate change, such as increased water temperature, sea level, human activity and habitat availability, further disrupt the ability of species, such as B. fultoni, to survive.

=== Management ===
As of 2020 there are over 180 rare, vulnerable, or endangered animal species that have been identified under the Threatened Species Protection Act 1995. Over half of these listed species are invertebrates and 37 species are from the genus Beddomeia. Management of B. fultoni alongside other members of the Beddomeia genus is predominantly governed by a series of parliamentary acts such as Tasmania's Threatened Species Protection Act 1995; Nature conservation act 2000 and Environment Protection and Biodiversity Conservation Act, 1999. The conservation measures are implemented through careful planning, restrictions and rule-sets such as the Forest Practices Code. However, currently species management is hampered by the lack of understanding and knowledge of the species' habitat preferences and responses to disturbance. For B. fultoni management, the main objective is to decrease extinction risk through the maintenance of the integrity of habitat at known sites. In addition to this, identifying new subpopulations of the species and increasing ecological understanding are also critical factors in the long-term management of the species.

== Behaviour and ecology ==
=== Reproduction and lifestyle ===
The Beddomeia species have shown no signs of seasonal reproductive peaks and are able to breed throughout the entire year. The species reproduces sexually and lays single eggs which are contained within a secreted sand-grain capsule. The size of the egg capsules is approximately one third of the adult body size and individual capsules are equipped with broad attachment bases. This design allows for eggs to be attached to the underside of submerged rocks. Incubation periods are unknown; however, prior to emergence, eggs develop into completely formed juvenile snail. It is predicted that most Beddomeia species live to approximately 5 years; however, these species develop slowly and are only expected to reach sexual maturity after 2–3 years. Due to low egg capsule to snail abundance ratios being recorded, it is believed that the fecundity of B. fultoni is low. These methods of reproduction prevent Beddomeia species from dispersing into new habitat, unlike most other molluscs which have a free-swimming larval stage.

=== Predators and competition ===
Molluscs in general have been found to be a large contributor to the diet of platypus; however, in Tasmania, stonefly nymphs, introduced trout and platypus have been outlined as key predators of hydrobiids. With exception to shell morphology, physiological predation responses of Hydrobiids are currently poorly known. Native snail populations and species like B. fultoni, particularly in lowland rural and urban streams, have also been negatively affected through the introduction of species such a Potamopyrgus antipodarium.

=== Feeding and digestion ===
In most occurrences, snails consume food via their mouths as they crawl over surfaces. Food is obtained in processes such as "area restricted searching" and "giving-up-time", in which the snails travel rapidly until they encounter a source of food and remain in this area until the resources run low have been. A method called "tropotaxis" allows the snails to orient in still waters by sensing and measuring the concentration of attractants in nearby locations. Upon arrival of these food sources, similar chemicals which stimulate tropotaxis are used to stimulate a feeding response. A muscular organ which contains the trophic apparatus, called the proboscis, is the first part of a snail to make contact with the substrate. It is common to find sand grains in the stomachs of freshwater snails such as Beddomeia fultoni. It is likely that this material is gathered and actively ingested in order to be used in the trituration of food.

== See also ==
- List of non-marine molluscs of Australia
- List of marine molluscs of Australia
- List of Beddomeia species
- Winston Ponder
