= Beddomeia zeehanensis =

Conservation status
- Vulnerable (IUCN 2.3)

Scientific classification
- Kingdom: Animalia
- Phylum: Mollusca
- Class: Gastropoda
- Subclass: Caenogastropoda
- Order: Littorinimorpha
- Family: Tateidae
- Genus: Beddomeia
- Species: B. zeehanensis

Binomial name
- Beddomeia zeehanensis Ponder & Clark, 1993

Species of gastropod

Beddomeia zeehanensis is a species of very small freshwater snail that has a gill and an operculum, an aquatic operculate gastropod mollusk in the family Hydrobiidae. The species was first described in 1993 by Winston Ponder and G.A. Clark.

The species is endemic to Tasmania.

== See also ==
- List of non-marine molluscs of Australia
