= Norfolcioconcha =

Scientific classification
- Domain: Eukaryota
- Kingdom: Animalia
- Phylum: Mollusca
- Class: Gastropoda
- Order: Stylommatophora
- Family: Charopidae
- Genus: Norfolcioconcha; H. B. Preston, 1913

Genus of gastropods

Norfolcioconcha is a genus of small air-breathing land snails, terrestrial pulmonate gastropod mollusks in the family Charopidae.

== Species ==
Species within the genus Norfolcioconch include:

- Norfolcioconcha iota
- Norfolcioconcha norfolkensis
