= Beddomeia averni =

Conservation status
- Vulnerable (IUCN 2.3)

Scientific classification
- Kingdom: Animalia
- Phylum: Mollusca
- Class: Gastropoda
- Subclass: Caenogastropoda
- Order: Littorinimorpha
- Family: Tateidae
- Genus: Beddomeia
- Species: B. averni

Binomial name
- Beddomeia averni Ponder & Clark, 1993

Species of gastropod

Beddomeia averni is a species of very small freshwater snail that has a gill and an operculum, an aquatic operculate gastropod mollusk in the family Hydrobiidae. This species is endemic to Australia. The Hydrobiidae snail has been categorized into four distinct groups: Beddomeia being one of them. Very little is known about their ecology and habitat. Low funding in Australia for the conservation of threatened species is partly responsible for this; moreover, there are only a few good sources that contribute to its limited data required to have a better understanding. Studies have shown that it is hard to distinguish the species from a morphology point of view (a method used in the classification of different species for centuries). A non-taxonomist may find it arduous to tell differences among different members of the species. Therefore the anatomical study is incorporated to understand and differentiate them. It is found that human-led actions such as agriculture, forestry, mining, etc have caused major degradation in their population. Other factors such as changes in water conditions due to sedimentation, varying temperature, mineral level, salinity can either positively/negatively impact their population.

== See also ==
- List of non-marine molluscs of Australia
