= Ascorhis =

Scientific classification
- Kingdom: Animalia
- Phylum: Mollusca
- Class: Gastropoda
- Subclass: Caenogastropoda
- Order: Littorinimorpha
- Family: Tateidae
- Genus: Ascorhis; Ponder & Clark, 1988

Genus of snails

Ascorhis is a genus of gastropods belonging to the family Tateidae.

The species of this genus are found in Australia.

Species:

- Ascorhis occidua Ponder & Clark, 1988
- Ascorhis tasmanica (Martens, 1858)
