= Beddomeia protuberata =

Conservation status
- Vulnerable (IUCN 2.3)

Scientific classification
- Kingdom: Animalia
- Phylum: Mollusca
- Class: Gastropoda
- Subclass: Caenogastropoda
- Order: Littorinimorpha
- Family: Tateidae
- Genus: Beddomeia
- Species: B. protuberata

Binomial name
- Beddomeia protuberata Ponder & Clark, 1993

Species of gastropod

Beddomeia protuberata is a species of endemic freshwater snail in the family Tateidae, found in northern Tasmania, Australia. The shells look ovate and periostracum yellow with some pustules, length between 2.29 mm and 2.93 mm and width between 2.01 mm and 2.34 mm. Beddomeia protuberata has 1.75 protoconch whorls. Its image of microsculpture is uniform and its wrinkles arranged weakly and helically. The teleoconch of beddomeia protuberata has 2.2 to 2.7 convex whorls, and the ratio of convexity is 0.15 to 0.24. Sculptures of the teleoconch are vague with prosocline growth lines. The margin of the last whorl is evenly circular. The thickness and width of inner lips are medium sizes, and the columellar swelled up prominently. The outer lips of Beddomeia protuberata is prosocline, which means the shell leans forwards compared to the shell's coiling axis. The width of their umbilicus is between 0.31 mm to 0.51 mm. The umbilicus of female beddomeia protuberata are wider than the umbilicus of male.

== Male and female reproduction system ==
=== Male reproduction system ===
The testis of male Beddomeia protuberata has whorls of 1.5. Their seminal vesicles are behind the stomach, at the anterior between about 1/4 to 1/3 of the first whorl of their testis, coiling on the stomach and on the digestive gland at the back of the stomach. The prostate gland in pallial roof is pyriform and its sections are closed and widely oval to circular. The vas deferens is straight and opening forward. The distal of penis is short and tapering, and some have papilla but some do not. The base and the middle part of penis are also tapering, short and wide. The penial duct is fluctuant at the base and middle part, and the base is fairly broad with medium to small sizes of folds.

=== Female reproduction system ===
The ovary of female Beddomeia protuberata is simple, inhabiting around 0.5 whorls. Their oviduct is proximal and has a pair of bends. The initial bend is aligned dorso-ventrally to obliquely rearwards, bounding with soft and glandular connective tissues. The bend extends to the rear edge bursa copulatrix or sometimes a little in front of the edge. Compared to the coiled initial part, the distal part is straight. The coiled oviduct and the bursal duct then meet together at the back pallial wall. Bursa copulatrix is small and vertically ovoid, not reaching the back pallial wall. The bursal duct is arising from abdominal margin of bursa. The seminal receptacle at the back of the edge of bursa copulatrix looks pear-shaped. On ahead of the back of pallial wall, there's about 1/2 of albumen gland. The thickness of capsule gland is medium, and is about longer than or equal to the length of albumen gland. The ventral channel has vestibule in front, and the terminal genital is opening but small in size.

== Distribution ==
The beddomeia protuberata group is found only Tasmania, and is limited by many factors, both intrinsic and extrinsic. For example, the local geology and local hydrological conditions (rainfall and water chemistry etc.) The products of human activities also influence and limit the distribution of Beddomeia protuberata. As a result, beddomeia protuberata is a very rare and endemic species in Australia, listed as rare status in the Threatened Species Protection Act (1995).

== See also ==
- List of non-marine molluscs of Australia
