= Posticobia =

Scientific classification
- Kingdom: Animalia
- Phylum: Mollusca
- Class: Gastropoda
- Subclass: Caenogastropoda
- Order: Littorinimorpha
- Family: Tateidae
- Genus: Posticobia; Iredale, 1943

Genus of gastropods

Posticobia is a genus of freshwater snails, aquatic gastropod molluscs in the family Tateidae.

This genus occurs in Australia and Norfolk Island.

== Species ==
Species within the genus Posticobia include:

- Posticobia brazieri
- Posticobia ponderi
- Posticobia norfolkensis
