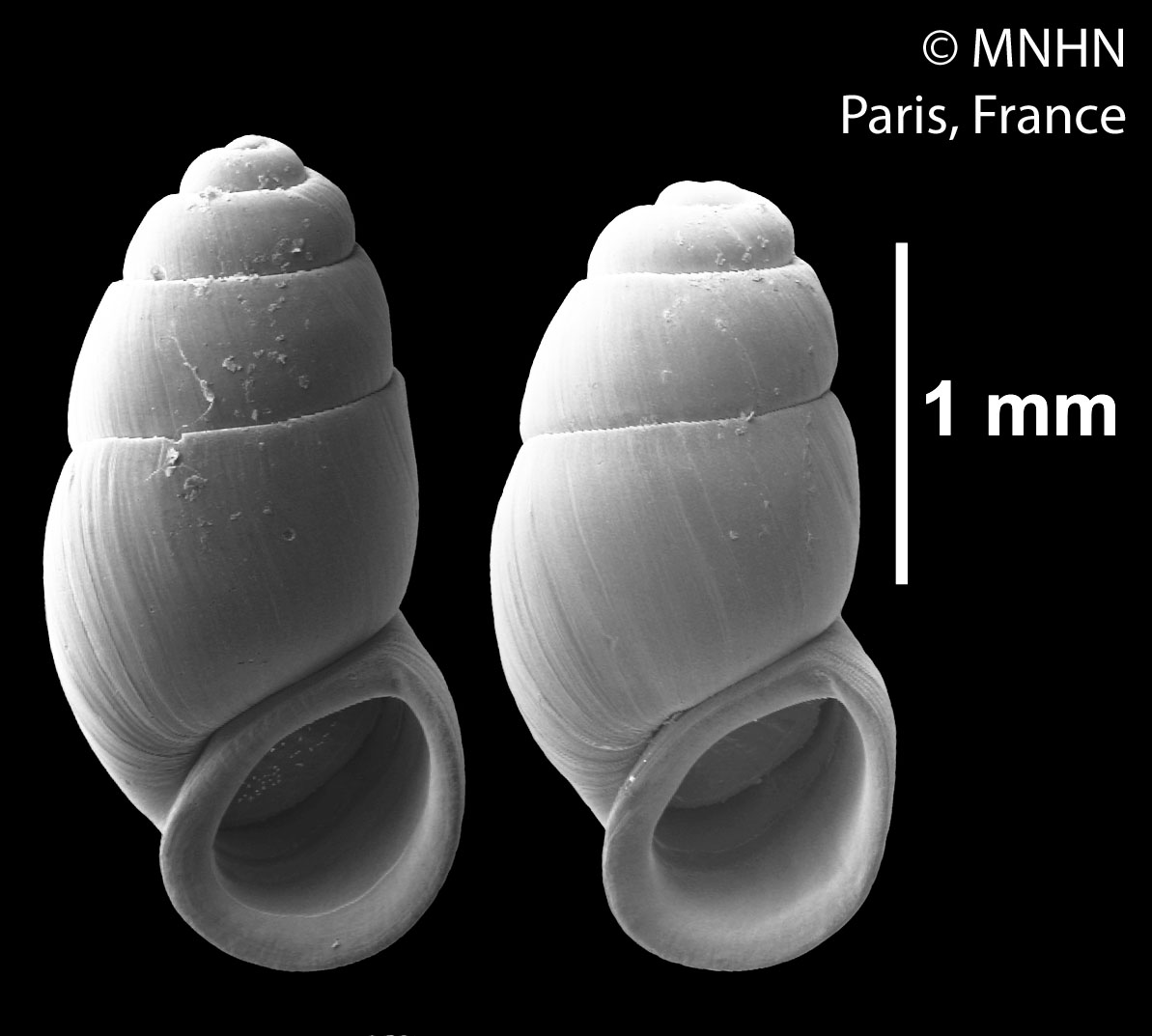
- Shell of Leiorhagium adioincola (paratype at MNHN, Paris)

Scientific classification
- Kingdom: Animalia
- Phylum: Mollusca
- Class: Gastropoda
- Subclass: Caenogastropoda
- Order: Littorinimorpha
- Superfamily: Truncatelloidea
- Family: Tateidae
- Genus: Leiorhagium; Haase & Bouchet, 1998

Type species
- Leiorhagium orokau Haase & Bouchet, 1998

= Leiorhagium =

Genus of gastropods

Leiorhagium is a genus of small freshwater snails, aquatic gastropod mollusks in the family Tateidae.

== Species ==
- Leiorhagium adioincola Haase & Zielske, 2015
- Leiorhagium ajie Haase & Bouchet, 1998
- Leiorhagium aremuum Haase & Zielske, 2015
- Leiorhagium cathartes Haase & Bouchet, 1998
- Leiorhagium clandestinum Haase & Zielske, 2015
- Leiorhagium douii Haase & Bouchet, 1998
- Leiorhagium granulum Haase & Bouchet, 1998
- Leiorhagium granum Haase & Bouchet, 1998
- Leiorhagium inplicatum Haase & Bouchet, 1998
- Leiorhagium kavuneva Haase & Bouchet, 1998
- Leiorhagium korngoldi Haase & Bouchet, 1998
- Leiorhagium monachum Haase & Bouchet, 1998
- Leiorhagium montfaouense Haase & Bouchet, 1998
- Leiorhagium mussorgskyi Haase & Bouchet, 1998
- Leiorhagium neteae Haase & Zielske, 2015
- Leiorhagium orokau Haase & Bouchet, 1998
- Leiorhagium ruali Haase & Bouchet, 1998
- Leiorhagium solemi Haase & Bouchet, 1998
- Leiorhagium supernum Haase & Bouchet, 1998
- Leiorhagium tectodentatum Haase & Bouchet, 1998
- Leiorhagium utriculatum Haase & Bouchet, 1998
