= Beddomeia inflata =

Conservation status
- Vulnerable (IUCN 3.1)

Scientific classification
- Kingdom: Animalia
- Phylum: Mollusca
- Class: Gastropoda
- Subclass: Caenogastropoda
- Order: Littorinimorpha
- Family: Tateidae
- Genus: Beddomeia
- Species: B. inflata

Binomial name
- Beddomeia inflata Ponder & Clark, 1993

Species of gastropod

Beddomeia inflata is a species of very small freshwater snail that has a gill and an operculum, an aquatic operculate gastropod mollusk in the family Hydrobiidae. This species is endemic to Australia.

== See also ==
- List of non-marine molluscs of Australia
