= Bonhamaropa =

Scientific classification
- Kingdom: Animalia
- Phylum: Mollusca
- Class: Gastropoda
- Order: Stylommatophora
- Family: Charopidae
- Genus: Bonhamaropa; Stanisic, 2018

Type species
- Helix kershawi Petterd, 1879

Species
- Bonhamaropa erskinensis (Gabriel, 1930); Bonhamaropa kershawi (Petterd, 1879); Bonhamaropa tarravillensis (Gabriel, 1930)

Genus of gastropods

Bonhamaropa is a genus of air-breathing land snails, terrestrial pulmonate gastropod mollusks in the family Charopidae. It is found in Australia in Tasmania and Victoria.
