= Penescosta sororcula =

Conservation status
- Vulnerable (IUCN 2.3)

Scientific classification
- Kingdom: Animalia
- Phylum: Mollusca
- Class: Gastropoda
- Order: Stylommatophora
- Family: Charopidae
- Genus: Penescosta
- Species: P. sororcula

Binomial name
- Penescosta sororcula Preston, 1913

Species of gastropod

Penescosta sororcula is a species of small air-breathing land snail, a terrestrial pulmonate gastropod mollusk in the family Charopidae. This species is endemic to Norfolk Island.
