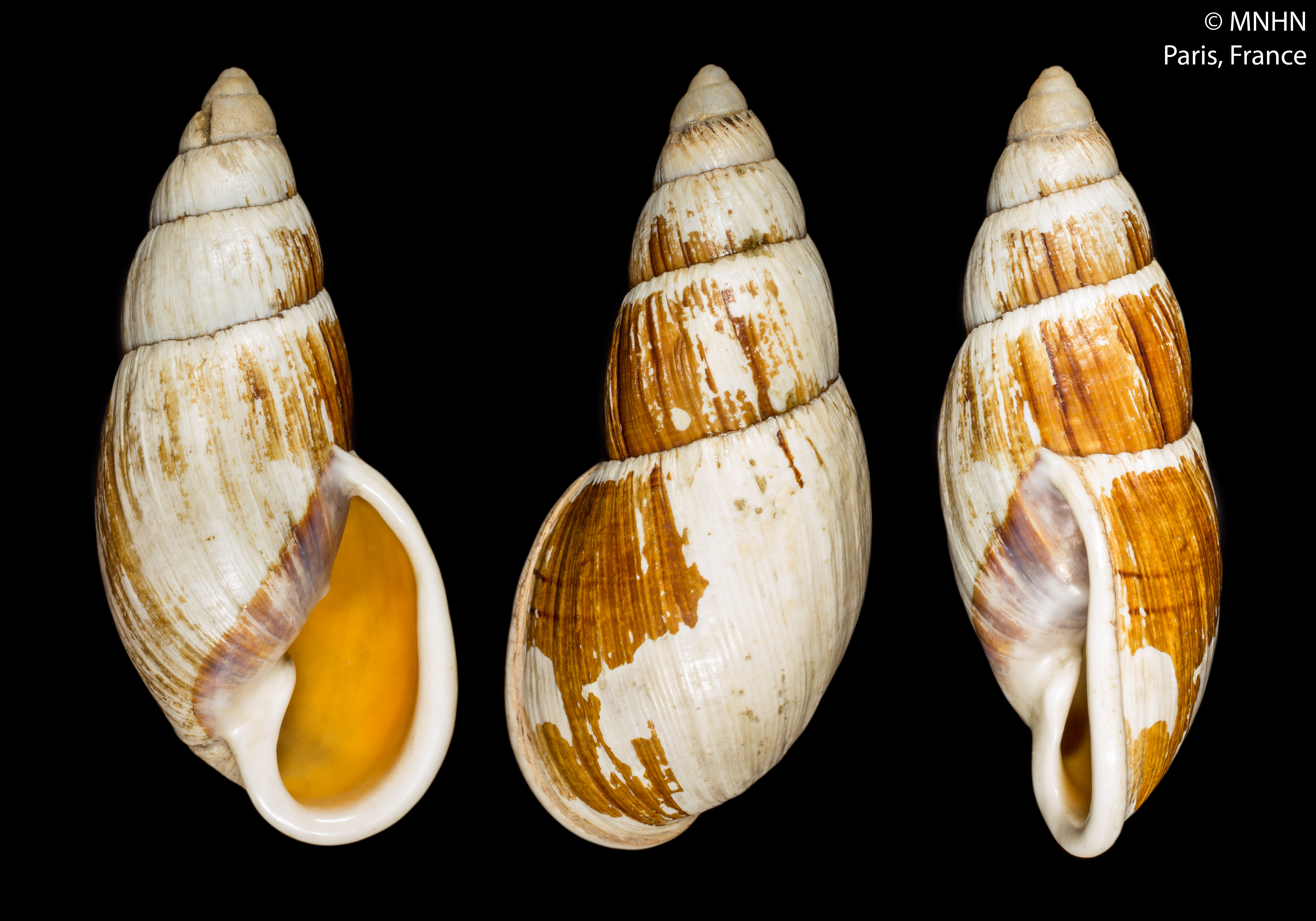
- Shell of Placostylus hongii (syntype at MNHN, Paris)

Conservation status
- Vulnerable (IUCN 2.3)

Scientific classification
- Kingdom: Animalia
- Phylum: Mollusca
- Class: Gastropoda
- Order: Stylommatophora
- Family: Bothriembryontidae
- Subfamily: Bothriembryontinae
- Genus: Maoristylus
- Species: M. hongii

Binomial name
- Maoristylus hongii (Lesson, 1830)

Synonyms
- Bulimus hongii Lesson, 1830; Bulimus novoseelandicus L. Pfeiffer, 1861; Bulimus shongii R. P. Lesson, 1830; Placostylus hongii Lesson, 1830; Placostylus (Maoristylus) hongii (Lesson, 1830)

= Maoristylus hongii =

Species of gastropod

Maoristylus hongii is a species of very large, air-breathing land snail, a terrestrial pulmonate gastropod mollusc in the family Bothriembryontidae.

== Description ==
The length of the shell attains 75 mm.

== Distribution ==
This species is endemic and occurs in New Zealand.

== Conservation status ==
Maoristylus hongii is classified by the New Zealand Department of Conservation as Range Restricted.

Buckley et al. (2011) from short sequence molecular phylogeny and shell dimensions, that there are no subspecies of Maoristylus hongii.
