= Norfolcioconcha iota =

Conservation status
- Vulnerable (IUCN 2.3)

Scientific classification
- Kingdom: Animalia
- Phylum: Mollusca
- Class: Gastropoda
- Order: Stylommatophora
- Family: Charopidae
- Genus: Norfolcioconcha
- Species: N. iota

Binomial name
- Norfolcioconcha iota H. B. Preston, 1913

Species of gastropod

Norfolcioconcha iota is a species of small air-breathing land snail, a terrestrial pulmonate gastropod mollusc, in the family Charopidae. This species is endemic to Norfolk Island.
