= Bonhamaropa erskinensis =

Conservation status
- Vulnerable (IUCN 2.3)

Scientific classification
- Kingdom: Animalia
- Phylum: Mollusca
- Class: Gastropoda
- Order: Stylommatophora
- Family: Charopidae
- Genus: Bonhamaropa
- Species: B. erskinensis

Binomial name
- Bonhamaropa erskinensis (Gabriel, 1930)

Synonyms
- Allocharopa erskinensis (Gabriel, 1930); Charopa erskinensis Gabriel, 1930

Species of gastropod

Bonhamaropa erskinensis is a species of very small air-breathing land snails, terrestrial pulmonate gastropod mollusks in the family Charopidae. This species is endemic to Australia.
