= Norfolcioconcha norfolkensis =

Conservation status
- Vulnerable (IUCN 2.3)

Scientific classification
- Kingdom: Animalia
- Phylum: Mollusca
- Class: Gastropoda
- Order: Stylommatophora
- Family: Charopidae
- Genus: Norfolcioconcha
- Species: N. norfolkensis

Binomial name
- Norfolcioconcha norfolkensis Hedley, 1899

Species of gastropod

Norfolcioconcha norfolkensis is a species of small air-breathing land snail, a terrestrial pulmonate gastropod mollusc, in the family Charopidae. This species is endemic to Norfolk Island.
