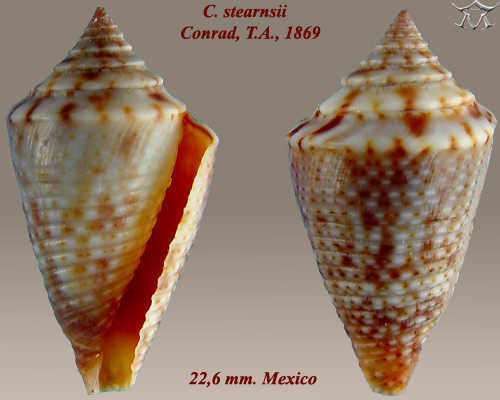
- Apertural and abapertural views of shell of Conasprella stearnsii Conrad, T.A., 1869
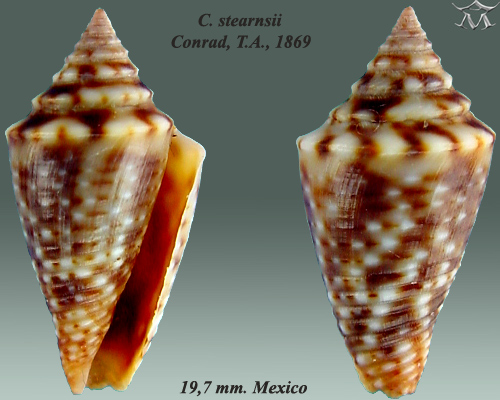

Scientific classification
- Kingdom: Animalia
- Phylum: Mollusca
- Class: Gastropoda
- Subclass: Caenogastropoda
- Order: Neogastropoda
- Superfamily: Conoidea
- Family: Conidae
- Genus: Conasprella
- Species: C. stearnsii

Binomial name
- Conasprella stearnsii (Conrad, 1869)

Synonyms
- Conasprella (Ximeniconus) stearnsii (Conrad, 1869) · accepted, alternate representation; Conus jaspideus stearnsii Conrad, 1869; Conus stearnsii Conrad, 1869 (original combination); Jaspidiconus jaspideus stearnsii (Conrad, 1869); Jaspidiconus stearnsii (Conrad, 1869)

= Conasprella stearnsii =

Species of gastropod

Conasprella stearnsii, common name Stearn's cone, is a species of sea snail, a marine gastropod mollusk in the family Conidae, the cone snails and their allies.

Like all species within the genus Conasprella, these snails are predatory and venomous. They are capable of stinging humans, therefore live ones should be handled carefully or not at all.

== Distribution ==
This species occurs in the Caribbean Sea and the Gulf of Mexico.

== Description ==
The maximum recorded shell length is 24.5 mm.

== Habitat ==
Minimum recorded depth is 0 m. Maximum recorded depth is 57 m.

== Gallery ==
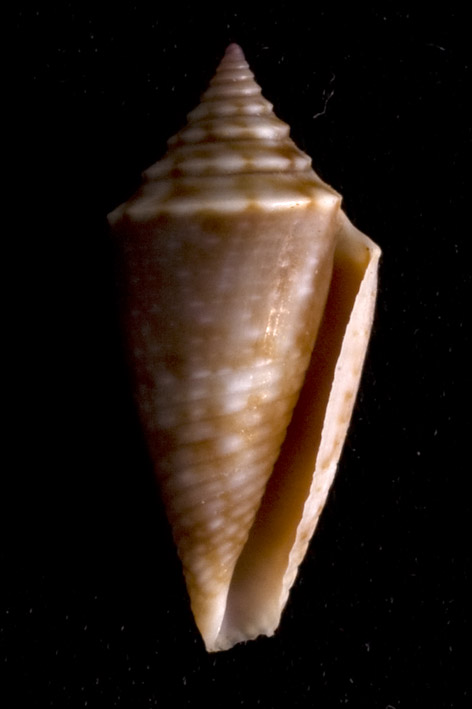
Apertural view of a shell of Conasprella stearnsii

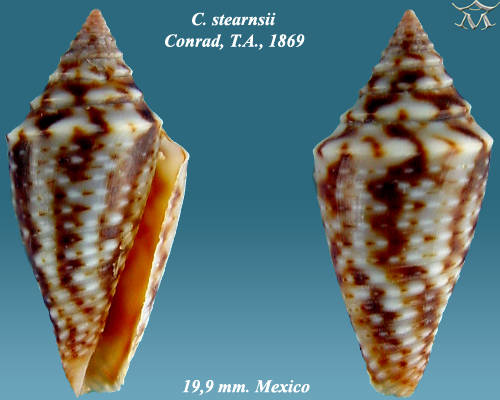
Conasprella stearnsii Conrad, T.A., 1869

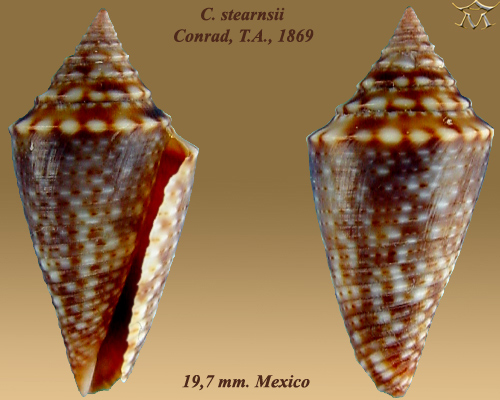
Conasprella stearnsii Conrad, T.A., 1869

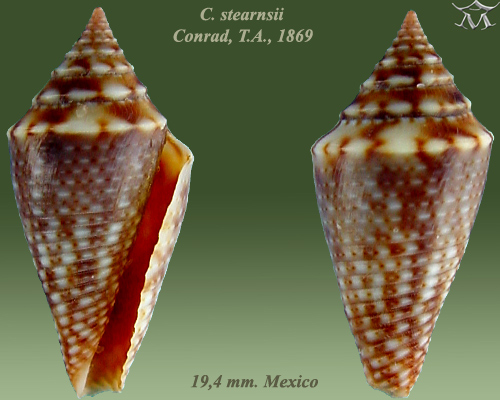
Conasprella stearnsii Conrad, T.A., 1869
