= William Frederick Petterd =

(1849–1910) scientist and boot importer

William Frederick Petterd was a Tasmanian scientist and boot importer.

He was born in Hobart in 1849, and died in Launceston in 1910.

His first book, A Monograph of the land shells of Tasmania, was the result of a talk to the Royal Society of Tasmania on 12 November 1878.

Petterd described Dundasite in 1893.

He wrote the Catalogue of the minerals of Tasmania, which was published in 1893, and updated the catalogue in 1909, the year before his death.

He was joint author of articles and books with William Harper Twelvetrees.

He was a rock and mineral collector, and when he died "His mineral collection, valued at £1212, was placed in charge of the Royal Society of Tasmania on loan for 999 years."
