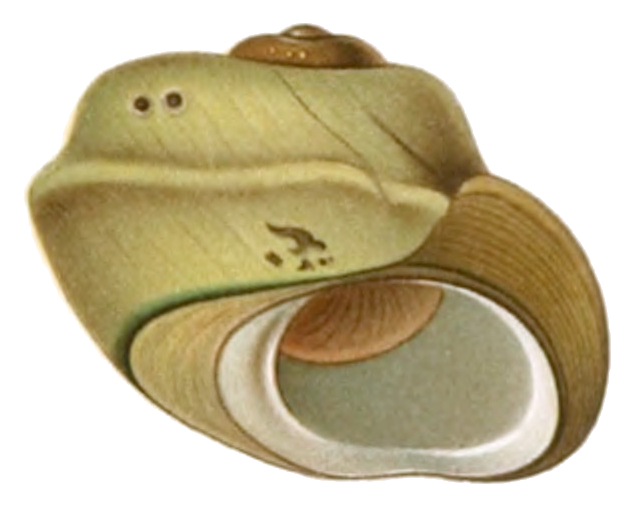
- Potamolithus rushii

Scientific classification
- Kingdom: Animalia
- Phylum: Mollusca
- Class: Gastropoda
- Subclass: Caenogastropoda
- Order: Littorinimorpha
- Superfamily: Truncatelloidea
- Family: Tateidae; Sacco, 1896 (1884)

Genera
- See text

Synonyms
- Hemistomiinae Thiele, 1929 junior subjective synonym; Potamopyrgidae F. C. Baker, 1928 junior subjective synonym; Tateinae Thiele, 1925 superseded rank

= Tateidae =

Family of gastropods

Tateidae is a family of very small and minute aquatic snails with an operculum, gastropod molluscs in the superfamily Truncatelloidea.

== Genera ==
Genera within the family Tateidae:

- Ascorhis Ponder & Clark, 1988
- Austropyrgus Cotton, 1942
- Beddomeia Petterd, 1889
- Caldicochlea Ponder, 1997
- Caledoconcha Haase & Bouchet, 1998
- Carnarvoncochlea Ponder, W.-H. Zhang, Hallan & Shea, 2019
- Catapyrgus Climo, 1974
- Conondalia Ponder, W.-H. Zhang, Hallan & Shea, 2019
- Crosseana Zielske & Haase, 2015
- Edgbastonia Ponder, 2008
- Eulodrobia Ponder, W.-H. Zhang, Hallan & Shea, 2019
- Fluvidona Iredale, 1937
- Fluviopupa Pilsbry, 1911
- Fonscochlea Ponder, Hershler & B. W. Jenkins, 1989
- Hadopyrgus Climo, 1974
- Halopyrgus Haase, 2008
- Hemistomia Crosse, 1872
- Indopyrgus Thiele, 1928
- Jardinella Ponder & G. A. Clark, 1990
- Kanakyella Haase & Bouchet, 1998
- Kuschelita Climo, 1974
- Leiorhagium Haase & Bouchet, 1998
- Leptopyrgus Haase, 2008
- Meridiopyrgus Haase, 2008
- Nanocochlea Ponder & G. A. Clark, 1993
- Novacaledonia Zielske & Haase, 2015
- Nundalia Ponder, W.-H. Zhang, Hallan & Shea, 2019
- Obtusopyrgus Haase, 2008
- Opacuincola Ponder, 1966
- Paxillostium N. Gardner, 1970
- Phrantela Iredale, 1943
- Pidaconomus Haase & Bouchet, 1998
- Platypyrgus Haase, 2008
- Posticobia Iredale, 1943
- Potamolithus Pilsbry, 1896
- Potamopyrgus Stimpson, 1865
- Pseudotricula Ponder, 1992
- Rakipyrgus Haase, 2008
- Rakiurapyrgus Haase, 2008
- Sororipyrgus Haase, 2008
- Springvalia Ponder, W.-H. Zhang, Hallan & Shea, 2019
- Strobelitatea Cazzaniga, 2017
- Sulawesidrobia Ponder & Haase, 2005
- Tatea Tenison Woods, 1879
- Tongapyrgus Haase, 2008
- Trochidrobia Ponder, Hershler & Jenkins, 1989
- Victodrobia Ponder & G. A. Clark, 1993
- Westrapyrgus Ponder, G. A. Clark & Miller, 1999

Genera brought into synonymy

- Fluviorissoina Iredale, 1944: synonym of Fluviopupa Pilsbry, 1911
- Pupidrobia Iredale, 1944: synonym of Fluviopupa Pilsbry, 1911
