= List of non-marine molluscs of Australia =

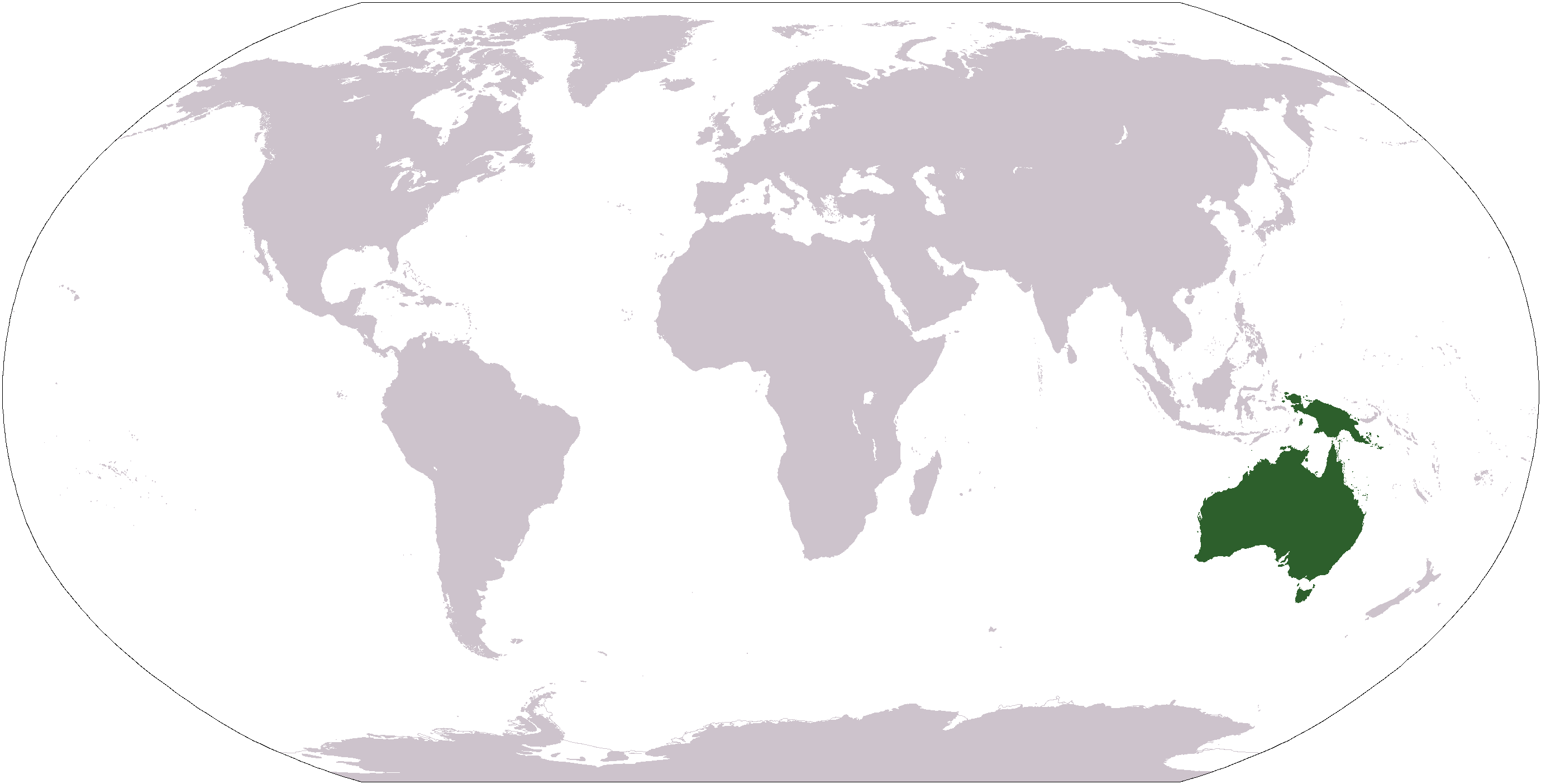
Location of Australia

This is a very incomplete list of the non-marine molluscs of the country of Australia. They are part of the invertebrate fauna of Australia.

== Freshwater gastropods ==
The freshwater molluscs of Australia vary greatly in size, shape, biology and evolutionary history, and more than 99% of the native species occur nowhere else on earth. Currently, there are more than 400 native described species and a further 100 species that are undescribed. A Lucid multi-access key for them, together with descriptions is found at Australian Freshwater Molluscs, Revision 1A.

=== Ampullariidae ===
==== Genus Pomacea ====
- Pomacea diffusa Blume, 1957

=== Assimineidae ===
==== Genus Austroassiminea ====
- Austroassiminea letha Solem, Girardi, Slack-Smith & Kendrick, 1982

==== Genus Aviassiminea ====
- Aviassiminea palitans Fukuda & Ponder, 2003

==== Genus Suterilla ====
- Suterilla fluviatilis Fukuda, Ponder & Marshall, 2006 (only found on Norfolk Island)

==== Genus Taiwanassiminea ====
- Taiwanassiminea bedaliensis (Rensch, 1934)
- Taiwanassiminea affinis (Böttger, 1887)

=== Bithyniidae ===
==== Genus Gabbia ====
- Gabbia adusta Ponder, 2003
- Gabbia affinis (E. A. Smith, 1882)
- Gabbia beecheyi Ponder, 2003
- Gabbia campicola Ponder, 2003
- Gabbia carinata Ponder, 2003
- Gabbia clathrata Ponder, 2003
- Gabbia davisi Ponder, 2003
- Gabbia fontana Ponder, 2003
- Gabbia iredalei Cotton, 1942
- Gabbia kendricki Ponder, 2003
- Gabbia kessneri Ponder, 2003
- Gabbia lutaria Ponder, 2003
- Gabbia microcosta Ponder, 2003
- Gabbia napierensis Ponder, 2003
- Gabbia obesa Ponder, 2003
- Gabbia pallidula Ponder, 2003
- Gabbia rotunda Ponder, 2003
- Gabbia smithii (Tate, 1882)
- Gabbia spiralis Ponder, 2003
- Gabbia tumida Ponder, 2003
- Gabbia vertiginosa (Frauenfeld, 1862)

=== Clenchiellidae ===
==== Genus Coleglabra ====
- Coleglabra nordaustralis Ponder, Fukuda and Hallan 2014

==== Genus Colenuda ====
- Colenuda kessneri Ponder, Fukuda and Hallan 2014

=== Cochliopidae ===
==== Genus Pyrgophorus ====
- Pyrgophorus platyrachis Thompson, 1968

=== Glacidorbidae ===
==== Genus Benthodorbis ====
- Benthodorbis fultoni Ponder & Avern, 2000
- Benthodorbis pawpela (B. J. Smith,1979)

=== Neritiliidae ===
==== Genus Neritilia ====
- Neritilia vulgaris Kano and Kase, 2003

=== Pachychilidae ===
==== Genus Pseudopotamis ====
- Pseudopotamis semoni Martens, 1894
- Pseudopotamis supralirata (E. A. Smith, 1887)

=== Tateidae ===
==== Genus Ascorhis ====
- Ascorhis occidua Ponder & Clark, 1988
- Ascorhis tasmanica (von Martens, 1858)

==== Genus Austropyrgus ====
- Austropyrgus abercrombiensis Clark, Miller & Ponder, 2003
- Austropyrgus angasi (E. A. Smith, 1882)
- Austropyrgus aslini Clark, Miller & Ponder, 2003
- Austropyrgus avius Clark, Miller & Ponder, 2003
- Austropyrgus bungoniensis Clark, Miller & Ponder, 2003
- Austropyrgus bunyaensis Miller, Ponder & Clark, 1999
- Austropyrgus centralia (Ponder, Colgan, Terzis, Clark & Miller, 1996)
- Austropyrgus colensis Clark, Miller & Ponder, 2003
- Austropyrgus cooma (Iredale, 1943)
- Austropyrgus dyerianus (Petterd, 1879)
- Austropyrgus elongatus (May, 1921)
- Austropyrgus eumekes Clark, Miller & Ponder, 2003
- Austropyrgus foris (Ponder, Colgan, Clark, Miller & Terzis, 1994)
- Austropyrgus grampianensis (Gabriel, 1939)
- Austropyrgus halletensis Clark, Miller & Ponder, 2003
- Austropyrgus nepeanensis Clark, Miller & Ponder, 2003
- Austropyrgus niger (Quoy & Gaimard, 1834)
- Austropyrgus ora Clark, Miller & Ponder, 2003
- Austropyrgus parvus Clark, Miller & Ponder, 2003
- Austropyrgus pusillus Clark, Miller & Ponder, 2003
- Austropyrgus rectoides Clark, Miller & Ponder, 2003
- Austropyrgus rectus (Ponder, Colgan, Clark, Miller & Terzis, 1994)
- Austropyrgus ronkershawi Clark, Miller & Ponder, 2003
- Austropyrgus salvus Clark, Miller & Ponder, 2003
- Austropyrgus simsonianus (Brazier, 1875)
- Austropyrgus sinuatus Clark, Miller & Ponder, 2003
- Austropyrgus smithii (Petterd, 1889)
- Austropyrgus sparsus (Iredale, 1944)
- Austropyrgus tateiformis Clark, Miller & Ponder, 2003
- Austropyrgus tumidus Clark, Miller & Ponder, 2003
- Austropyrgus turbatus (Ponder, Colgan, Clark, Miller & Terzis, 1994)

==== Genus Beddomeia ====
- Beddomeia hullii Petterd, 1889
- Beddomeia launcestonensis (Johnston, 1879)
- Beddomeia minima Petterd, 1889

==== Genus Caldicochlea ====
Caldicochlea is a genus with two species, endemic to the Dalhousie Springs supergroup.

- Caldicochlea globosa (Ponder, Colgan, Terzis, Clark & Miller, 1996)
- Caldicochlea harrisi (Ponder, Colgan, Terzis, Clark & Miller, 1996)

==== Genus Carnarvoncochlea ====
- Carnarvoncochlea carnarvonensis (Ponder & Clark, 1990)
- Carnarvoncochlea exigua (Ponder & Clark, 1990)

==== Genus Conondalia ====
- Conondalia buzwilsoni Ponder, Zhan, Hallan & Shea, 2019

==== Genus Jardinella ====
- Jardinella thaanumi (Pilsbry, 1900)
- Jardinella tullyensis Ponder, 1991
- Jardinella tumorosa Ponder, 1991

==== Genus Nundalia ====
- Nundalia secreta Ponder, Zhan, Hallan & Shea, 2019

==== Genus Pseudotricula ====
- Pseudotricula arthurclarkei Ponder, Clark, Eberhard & Studdert, 2005
- Pseudotricula auriforma Ponder, Clark, Eberhard & Studdert, 2005
- Pseudotricula conica Ponder, Clark, Eberhard & Studdert, 2005
- Pseudotricula eberhardi Ponder, 1992
- Pseudotricula elongata Ponder, Clark, Eberhard & Studdert, 2005
- Pseudotricula expandolabra Ponder, Clark, Eberhard & Studdert, 2005
- Pseudotricula progenitor Ponder, Clark, Eberhard & Studdert, 2005

==== Genus Springvalia ====
- Springvalia isolata (Ponder & Clark, 1990)

==== Genus Tatea ====
- Tatea rufilabris (A. Adams, 1862)
- Tatea huonensis (Tenison Woods, 1876)

==== Genus Trochidrobia ====
Trochidrobia is a genus of small gastropods belonging to the family Tateidae. Trochidrobia is endemic to Lake Eyre supergroup, found in artesian springs between Marree and Oodnadatta (northern South Australia). Trochidrobia have smooth and thin periuoostraca, and thin, simple and oval-shaped opercula. There are currently four species described in the genus Trochidrobia:

- Trochidrobia inflata Ponder, Hershler and Jenkins, 1989
- Trochidrobia minuta Ponder, Hershler and Jenkins, 1989
- Trochidrobia punicea Ponder, Hershler and Jenkins, 1989
- Trochidrobia smithi Ponder, Hershler and Jenkins, 1989

==== Genus Victodrobia ====
- Victodrobia burni Ponder & Clark, 1993
- Victodrobia elongata Ponder & Clark, 1993
- Victodrobia millerae Ponder & Clark, 1993
- Victodrobia victoriensis Ponder & Clark, 1993

==== Genus Westrapyrgus ====
- Westrapyrgus slacksmithae Ponder, Clark and Miller, 1999
- Westrapyrgus westralis Ponder, Clark & Miller, 1999

=== Thiaridae ===
==== Genus Melanoides ====
- Melanoides tuberculata (Müller, 1774)

==== Genus Melasma ====
- Melasma onca (Adams and Angas, 1864)

==== Genus Mienplotia ====
- Mieniplotia scabra (O. F. Müller, 1774)

==== Genus Plotiopsis ====
- Plotiopsis balonnensis (Conrad, 1850)

==== Genus Ripalania ====
- Ripalania queenslandica (Smith, 1882)

==== Genus Sermyla ====
- Sermyla riqueti Grateloup, 1840
- Sermyla venustula (Brot, 1877)

==== Genus Stenomelania ====
- Stenomelania cf. aspirans (Hinds, 1844)
- Stenomelania denisoniensis (Brot, 1877

==== Genus Thiara ====
- Thiara amarula (Linnaeus, 1758)
- Thiara australis Lea & Lea, 1850

===== Viviparidae =====
- Cipangopaludina japonica (Martens, 1861) - known from the Austral Watergardens at Cowan, New South Wales in Sydney.
- Larina lirata (Tate, 1887)
- Larina strangei A. Adams, 1864
- Notopala ampullaroides (Reeve, 1863)
- Notopala essingtonensis (Frauenfeld, 1862)
- Notopala hanleyi (Frauenfeld, 1864)
- Notopala kingi (A. Adams & Angas, 1864)
  - Notopala kingi kingi (A. Adams & Angas, 1864)
  - Notopala kingi suprafasciata (Tryon, 1866)
- Notopala sublineata Conrad, 1850
  - Notopala sublineata sublineata Conrad, 1850
  - Notopala sublineata alisoni (Brazier, 1879)
- Notopala waterhousii (Adams & Angus, 1864)
- Notopala tricincta (E. A. Smith, 1882)
- Sinotaia guangdungensis (Kobelt, 1906) - known from the Lane Cove River, Sydney, New South Wales (Shea 1994).

== Land gastropods ==
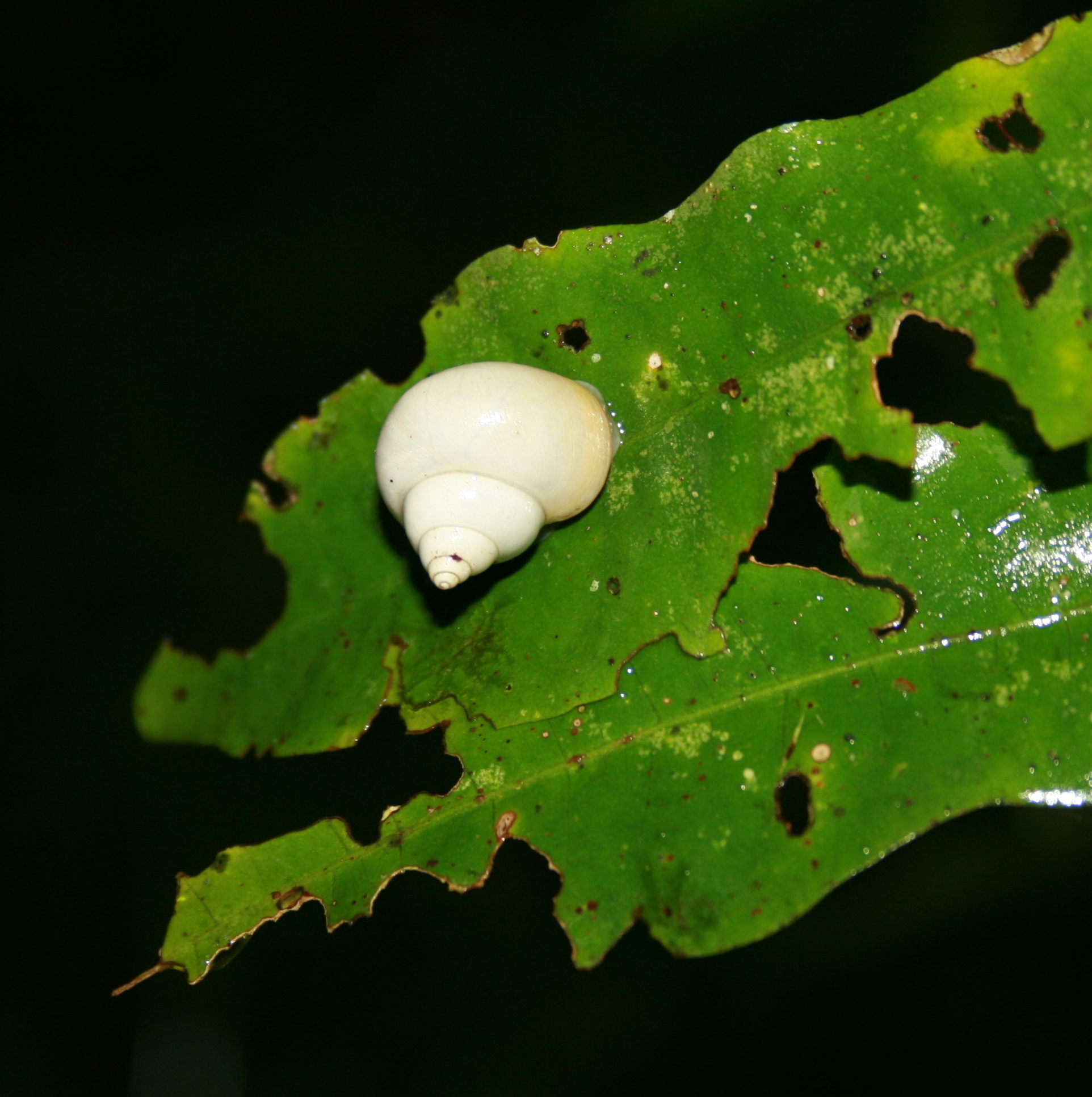
Noctepuna cerea from North-East Queensland

Pupillidae

- Gyliotrachela catherina Solem, 1981
- Pupilla ficulnea (Tate, 1894)

Bothriembryontidae

- Bothriembryon balteolus Iredale, 1939
- Bothriembryon barretti Iredale, 1930
- Bothriembryon costulatus (Potiez & Michaud, 1838)
- Bothriembryon cummingsi Morrison & Schneider, 2021
- Bothriembryon distinctus Iredale, 1939
- Bothriembryon fragilis Morrison, Schneider & Whisson, 2019
- Bothriembryon grohi Morrison & Schneider, 2022
- Bothriembryon kingii (Gray, 1825)
- Bothriembryon mastersi (Cox, 1867)
- Bothriembryon maxwelli (Kobelt, 1901)
- Bothriembryon nanambinia Morrison, 2021
- Bothriembryon onslowi (Cox, 1864)
- Bothriembryon revectus Iredale, 1939
- Bothriembryon reseotinctus Morrison & Schneider, 2022
- Bothriembryon schneideri Morrison, 2021
- Bothriembryon toolinna Schneider & Morrison, 2018
- Bothriembryon wagoeensis Morrison & Schneider, 2022
- Bothriembryon whitleyi Iredale, 1939 - possibly extinct

Charopidae

- Arcadiaropa sunnyholt Stanisic, 2020
- Brigaloropa costulata Stanisic, 2020
- Bindiropa irwinae Stanisic, 2022
- Carnaropa racecourse Stanisic, 2022
- Carnaropa salvatorosa Stanisic, 2022
- Cineropa hewittorum Stanisic, 2022
- Cineropa rama Stanisic, 2022
- Discocharopa aperta (Möllendorff, 1888)
- Eddiea brigge Stanisic, 2022
- Eddiea carnarvon Stanisic, 2022
- Eddiea oakwells Stanisic, 2022
- Eddiea waddybrae Stanisic, 2022
- Gyrocochlea occidentalis Stanisic, 2022
- Platyumbiropa grafton Stanisic, 2022
- Platyumbiropa tabor Stanisic, 2022
- Rhophodon moffatt Stanisic, 2020
- Spiraliropa carnarvon Stanisic, 2010
- Stanisicaropa covidurnus Stanisic, 2022
- Tristanoropa crowman Stanisic, 2020
- Tristanoropa palmgrove Stanisic, 2020
- Tristanoropa saddler Stanisic, 2020

Camaenidae

- Amphidromus cognatus Fulton, 1907
- Amplirhagada epiphallica Köhler, 2011
- Amplirhagada alicunda Köhler, 2011
- Amplirhagada alkuonides Köhler, 2011
- Amplirhagada anderdonensis Köhler, 2010
- Amplirhagada angustocauda Köhler, 2011
- Amplirhagada atlantis Köhler, 2011
- Amplirhagada basilica Köhler, 2010
- Amplirhagada bendraytoni Köhler, 2011
- Amplirhagada berthierana Köhler, 2010
- Amplirhagada boongareensis Köhler, 2010
- Amplirhagada buffonensis Köhler, 2010
- Amplirhagada camdenensis Köhler, 2010
- Amplirhagada carsoniana Köhler, 2011
- Amplirhagada coffea Köhler, 2011
- Amplirhagada davidsoniana Köhler, 2011
- Amplirhagada decora Köhler, 2010
- Amplirhagada descartesana Köhler, 2010
- Amplirhagada discoidea Köhler, 2011
- Amplirhagada dubitabile Köhler, 2010
- Amplirhagada euroa Köhler, 2010
- Amplirhagada forrestiana Köhler, 2011
- Amplirhagada gardneriana Köhler, 2011
- Amplirhagada gemina Köhler, 2010
- Amplirhagada gibsoni Köhler, 2010
- Amplirhagada globosa Köhler, 2011
- Amplirhagada indistincta Köhler, 2010
- Amplirhagada inusitata Köhler, 2011
- Amplirhagada kessneri Köhler, 2010
- Amplirhagada kimberleyana Köhler, 2010
- Amplirhagada lamarckiana Köhler, 2010
- Amplirhagada lindsayae Köhler, 2011
- Amplirhagada mckenziei Köhler, 2010
- Amplirhagada montesqieuana Köhler, 2010
- Amplirhagada moraniana Köhler, 2011
- Amplirhagada ponderi Köhler, 2010
- Amplirhagada puescheli Köhler, 2010
- Amplirhagada regia Köhler, 2010
- Amplirhagada sinenomine Köhler, 2011
- Amplirhagada solemiana Köhler, 2010
- Amplirhagada sphaeroidea Köhler, 2010
- Amplirhagada storriana Köhler, 2011
- Amplirhagada tricenaria Köhler, 2010
- Amplirhagada uwinsensis Köhler, 2010
- Amplirhagada vialae Köhler, 2011
- Amplirhagada yorkensis Köhler, 2010
- Arnhemtrachia ramingining Köhler & Criscione, 2013
- Australocosmica augustae Köhler, 2011
- Australocosmica bernoulliensis Criscione & Köhler, 2013
- Australocosmica buffonensis Criscione & Köhler, 2013
- Australocosmica crassicostata Criscione & Köhler, 2013
- Australocosmica nana Criscione & Köhler, 2013
- Australocosmica pallida Criscione & Köhler, 2013
- Australocosmica rotunda Criscione & Köhler, 2013
- Australocosmica sanctumpatriciusae Köhler, 2011
- Australocosmica vulcanica Köhler, 2011
- Austrochloritis copelandensis Shea & Köhler, 2020
- Austrochloritis niangala Shea & Griffiths, 2010
- Austrochloritis nundinalis Iredale, 1943
- Baudinella boongareensis Köhler, 2011
- Baudinella magna Criscione & Köhler, 2014
- Baudinella margaritata Criscione & Köhler, 2014
- Baudinella occidentalis Köhler, 2011
- Baudinella setobaudinioides Köhler, 2011
- Baudinella thielei Köhler, 2011
- Baudinella tuberculata Köhler, 2011
- Cardiotrachia bastionensis Criscione & Köhler, 2014
- Carinotrachia admirale Köhler, 2010 - with two of its subspecies: Carinotrachia admirale admirale Köhler, 2010 and Carinotrachia admirale elevata Köhler, 2010
- Denhamiana laetifica Stanisic, 2013
- Denhamiana leichhardti Stanisic, 2013
- Globorhagada confusa Köhler, 2011
- Globorhagada uwinsensis Köhler, 2011
- Globorhagada wurroolgu Köhler, 2011
- Globorhagada yoowadan Köhler, 2011
- Kimberleydiscus Köhler, 2010 - with the only one species Kimberleydiscus fasciatus Köhler, 2010
- Kimberleymelon Köhler, 2010 - with the only one species Kimberleymelon tealei Köhler, 2010
- Kimberleytrachia achernaria Köhler, 2011
- Kimberleytrachia aequum Köhler, 2011
- Kimberleytrachia alphacentauri Köhler, 2011
- Kimberleytrachia amplirhagadoides Köhler, 2011
- Kimberleytrachia canopi Köhler, 2011
- Kimberleytrachia chartacea Köhler, 2011
- Kimberleytrachia hirsuta Köhler, 2011
- Kimberleytrachia jacksonensis Criscione & Köhler, 2014
- Kimberleytrachia leopardus Criscione & Köhler, 2014
- Kimberleytrachia nelsonensis Criscione & Köhler, 2014
- Kimberleytrachia serrata Criscione & Köhler, 2014
- Kimberleytrachia setosa Criscione & Köhler, 2014
- Kimberleytrachia silvaepluvialis Criscione & Köhler, 2014
- Kimberleytrachia somniator Köhler, 2011
- Kimboraga cascadensis Köhler, 2011
- Kimboraga glabra Köhler, 2011
- Kimboraga wulalam Köhler, 2011
- Molema stankowskii Köhler, 2011
- Molema tenuicostata Criscione & Köhler, 2014
- Nanotrachia carinata Köhler & Criscione, 2013
- Nanotrachia coronata Köhler & Criscione, 2013
- Nanotrachia costulata Köhler & Criscione, 2013
- Nanotrachia intermedia (Solem, 1984)
- Nanotrachia levis Köhler & Criscione, 2013
- Nanotrachia orientalis (Solem, 1984)
- Noctepuna cerea (Hedley, 1894)
- Nodulabium solidum Criscione & Köhler, 2013
- Ototrachia compressa Criscione & Köhler, 2013
- Pallidelix simonhudsoni Stanisic, 2015
- Pseudomesodontrachia gregoriana Criscione & Köhler, 2013
- Rachita carltonensis Criscione & Köhler, 2014
- Retroterra acutocostata Köhler, 2011
- Retroterra aequabilis Köhler, 2011
- Retroterra dichroma Criscione & Köhler, 2014
- Retroterra discoidea Köhler, 2011
- Retroterra nana Criscione & Köhler, 2014
- Rhagada angulata Solem, 1997
- Rhagada biggeana Köhler, 2011
- Rhagada bulgana Solem, 1997
- Rhagada capensis Solem, 1997
- Rhagada convicta (Cox, 1870)
- Rhagada crystalla Solem, 1985
- Rhagada cygna Solem, 1997
- Rhagada dampierana Solem, 1997
- Rhagada dominica Köhler, 2011
- Rhagada dringi (L. Pfeiffer, 1846)
- Rhagada elachystoma (Martens, 1878)
- Rhagada felicitas Köhler, 2011
- Rhagada gatta Iredale, 1939
- Rhagada globosa Solem, 1997
- Rhagada harti Solem, 1985
- Rhagada intermedia Solem, 1997
- Rhagada karajarri Burghardt & Köhler, 2015
- Rhagada kessneri Köhler, 2011
- Rhagada minima Solem, 1997
- Rhagada perprima Iredale, 1939
- Rhagada pilbarana Solem, 1997
- Rhagada plicata Preston, 1914
- Rhagada primigena Köhler, 2011
- Rhagada radleyi Preston, 1908
- Rhagada reinga (L. Pfeiffer, 1846)
- Rhagada richardsonii (E. A. Smith, 1874)
- Rhagada sheaei Köhler, 2011
- Rhagada torulus (Férussac, 1820)
- Rhagada worora Burghardt & Köhler, 2015
- Setobaudinia capillacea Köhler, 2011
- Setobaudinia garlinju Köhler, 2011
- Setobaudinia gumalamala Köhler, 2011
- Setobaudinia herculea Köhler, 2011
- Setobaudinia insolita Köhler, 2011
- Setobaudinia joycei Köhler, 2011
- Setobaudinia kalumburuana Köhler, 2011
- Setobaudinia karczewski Köhler, 2011
- Setobaudinia ngurraali Köhler, 2011
- Setobaudinia quinta Köhler, 2011
- Setobaudinia umbadayi Köhler, 2011
- Setobaudinia wuyurru Köhler, 2011
- Setocallosa pathutchingsae Criscione & Köhler, 2015
- Torresitrachia allouarni Köhler, 2011
- Torresitrachia aquilonia Köhler, 2011
- Torresitrachia baudini Köhler, 2011
- Torresitrachia brookei Köhler, 2011
- Torresitrachia eclipsis Köhler, 2011
- Torresitrachia flindersi Köhler, 2011
- Torresitrachia freycineti Köhler, 2011
- Torresitrachia girgarinae Köhler, 2011
- Torresitrachia hartogi Köhler, 2011
- Torresitrachia houtmani dampieri Köhler, 2011
- Torresitrachia houtmani houtmani Köhler, 2011
- Torresitrachia janszi Köhler, 2011
- Torresitrachia leichhardti Köhler, 2011
- Torresitrachia tasmani Köhler, 2011
- Torresitrachia urvillei Köhler, 2011

== Freshwater bivalves ==
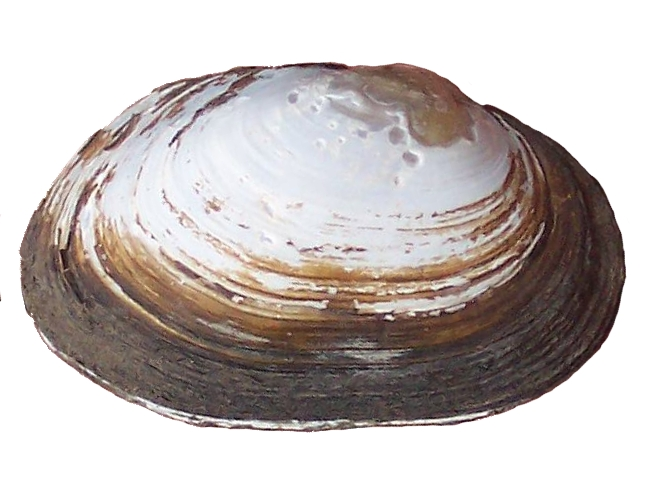
Velesunio ambiguos

The freshwater mollusks of Australia vary greatly in size, shape, biology and evolutionary history, and more than 99% of the native species occur nowhere else on earth. Currently, there are 46 bivalve species that are described with several other known species yet to be described.

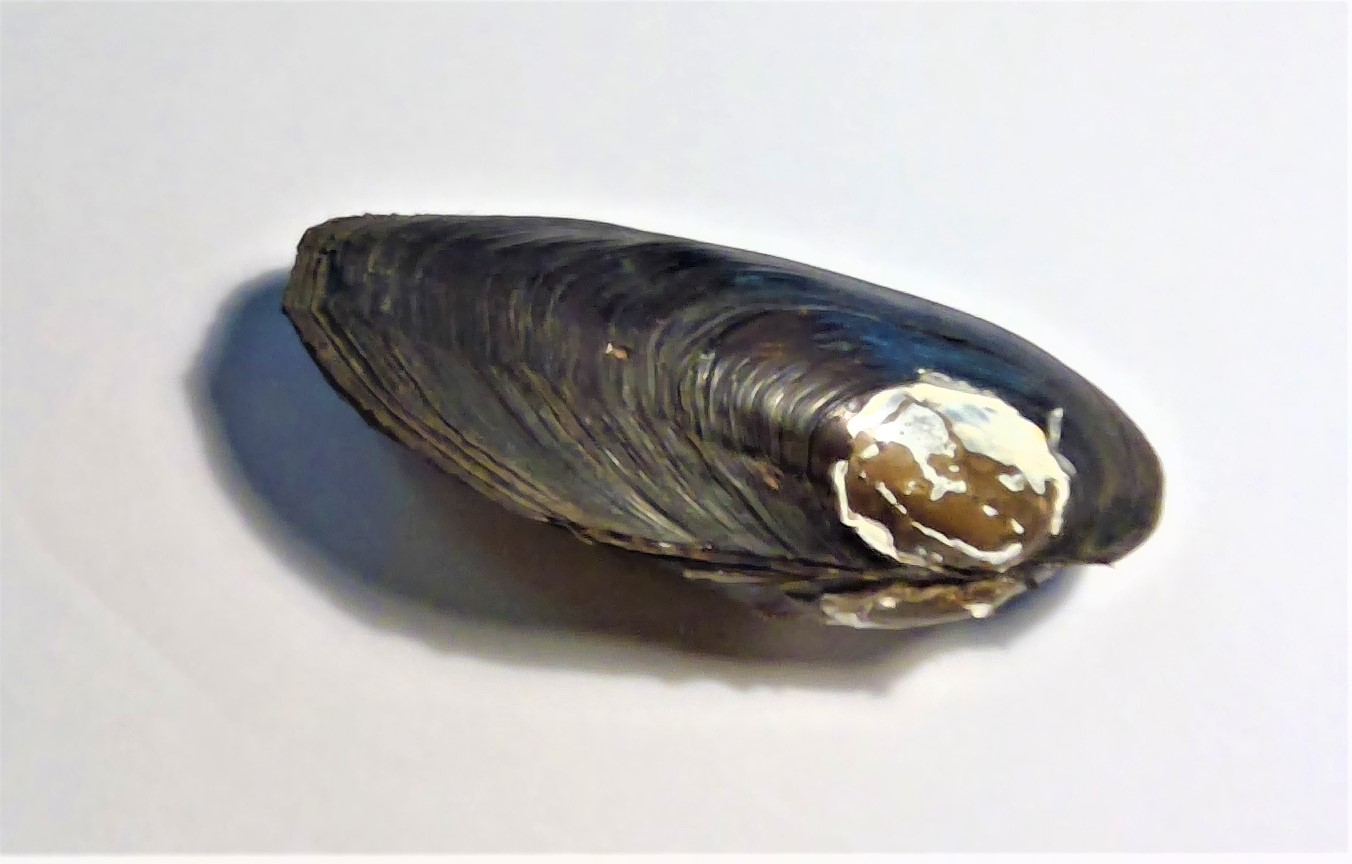
Velesunio wilsonii from the Ross River, Townsville, Queensland, Australia

Corbulidae

- Lentidium dalyfluvialis Hallan & Willan, 2010

Cyrenidae

- Batissa australis (Deshayes, 1855)
- Batissa violacea (Lamarck, 1818)
- Corbicula australis (Deshayes, 1830)
- Corbicula fluminea Müller, 1774

Hyriidae

- Alathyria condola Iredale, 1943
- Alathyria jacksoni Iredale, 1934
- Alathyria pertexta
  - Alathyria pertexta pertexta Iredale, 1934
  - Alathyria pertexta wardi Iredale, 1943
- Alathyria profuga (Gould, 1850)
- Cucumerunio novaehollandiae (Gray, 1834)
- Hyridella aquilonalis (Iredale, 1934)
- Hyridella australis (Lamarck, 1819)
- Hyridella depressa (Lamarck, 1819)
- Hyridella drapeta (Iredale, 1934)
- Hyridella glenelgensis Dennant, 1898
- Hyridella interserta (Iredale, 1934)
- Hyridella narracanensis (Cotton & Gabriel, 1932)
- Lortiella froggatti (Iredale, 1934)
- Lortiella opertanea Ponder & Bayer, 2004
- Lortiella rugata (Sowerby, 1868)
- Westralunio carteri Iredale, 1934
- Velesunio ambiguus (Philippi, 1847)
- Velesunio angasi (Sowerby, 1867)
- Velesunio moretonicus (Sowerby, 1865)
- Velesunio wilsonii (Lea, 1859)

Lasaeidae

- Arthritica sp. (new species)

Mytilidae (brackish)

- Limnoperna fortunei (Dunker, 1857)
- Xenostrobus securis (Lamarck, 1819)

Sphaeriidae

- Pisidium aslini Kuiper, 1983
- Musculium kendricki (Kuiper, 1983)
- Musculium lacusedes (Iredale, 1943)
- Musculium cf. lacustre (Müller, 1774)
- Musculium problematicum (Gabriel, 1939)
- Musculium quirindi Korniushin, 2000
- Musculium tasmanicum
  - Musculium tasmanicum queenslandicum (. A. Smith, 1883)
  - Musculium tasmanicum tasmanicum (Tenison-Woods, 1876)
- Musculium tatiarae (Cotton & Godfrey, 1938)
- Pisidium carum (Cotton, 1953)
- Pisidium centrale Korniushin, 2000
- Pisidium etheridgei E.A.Smith, 1883
- Pisidium fultoni Kuiper, 1983
- Pisidium hallae Kuiper, 1983
- Pisidium kosciusko (Iredale, 1943)
- Pisidium ponderi Korniushin, 2000
- Pisidium tasmanicum Tenison-Woods, 1876
- Pisidium australiense Korniushin, 2000

Trapezidae

- Fluviolanatus subtortus (Dunker, 1857)

== See also ==
- List of marine molluscs of Australia
- List of non-marine molluscs of Papua New Guinea
- List of non-marine molluscs of New Caledonia
- List of non-marine molluscs of New Zealand
