= Jardinella =

Scientific classification
- Kingdom: Animalia
- Phylum: Mollusca
- Class: Gastropoda
- Subclass: Caenogastropoda
- Order: Littorinimorpha
- Superfamily: Truncatelloidea
- Family: Tateidae
- Genus: Jardinella; Ponder & G. A. Clark, 1990

Type species
- Petterdiana thaanumi Pilsbry, 1900

Synonyms
- Jardinella Iredale & Whitley, 1938 (introduced without description by Iredale & Whitley; validly described by Ponder & Clark, 1990)

Genus of gastropods

Jardinella is a genus of small freshwater snails, aquatic gastropod mollusks in the family Tateidae.

== Distribution ==
The genus Jardinella is endemic to Queensland, Australia. Jardinella species live in four spring "supergroups" in the Great Artesian Basin: Springsure, Barcaldine, Springvale and Eulo. Jardinella tumorosa lives in Little Mulgrave River.

== Species ==
Species within the genus Jardinella include:

- Jardinella thaanumi (Pilsbry, 1900)
- Jardinella tullyensis Ponder, 1991
- Jardinella tumorosa Ponder, 1991

Species brought into synonymy

- Jardinella acuminata Ponder & Clark, 1990: synonym of Edgbastonia acuminata (Ponder & G. A. Clark, 1990)
- Jardinella carnarvonensis Ponder & Clark, 1990: synonym of Carnarvoncochlea carnarvonensis (Ponder & Clark, 1990) (basionym)
- Jardinella colmani Ponder & Clark, 1990: synonym of Edgbastonia colmani (Ponder & G. A. Clark, 1990)
- Jardinella coreena Ponder & Clark, 1990: synonym of Edgbastonia coreena (Ponder & G. A. Clark, 1990) (basionym)
- Jardinella corrugata Ponder & Clark, 1990: synonym of Edgbastonia corrugata (Ponder & G. A. Clark, 1990) (basionym)
- Jardinella edgbastonensis Ponder & Clark, 1990: synonym of Edgbastonia edgbastonensis (Ponder & G. A. Clark, 1990) (basionym)
- Jardinella eulo Ponder & Clark, 1990: synonym of Eulodrobia eulo (Ponder & G. A. Clarke, 1990) (basionym)
- Jardinella exigua Ponder & Clark, 1990: synonym of Carnarvoncochlea exigua (Ponder & Clark, 1990) (basionym)
- Jardinella isolata Ponder & Clark, 1990: synonym of Springvalia isolata (Ponder & G. A. Clark, 1990) (basionym)
- Jardinella jesswiseae Ponder & Clark, 1990: synonym of Edgbastonia jesswisseae (Ponder & G. A. Clark, 1990) (basionym)
- Jardinella pallida Ponder & Clark, 1990: synonym of Edgbastonia pallida (Ponder & G. A. Clark, 1990) (basionym)
- Jardinella zeidlerorum Ponder & Clark, 1990: synonym of Edgbastonia zeidlerorum (Ponder & G. A. Clark, 1990) (basionym)
