= Noctepuna muensis =

Conservation status
- Data Deficient (IUCN 2.3)

Scientific classification
- Kingdom: Animalia
- Phylum: Mollusca
- Class: Gastropoda
- Order: Stylommatophora
- Family: Camaenidae
- Genus: Noctepuna
- Species: N. muensis

Binomial name
- Noctepuna muensis (Hedley, 1912)

Species of gastropod

Noctepuna muensis is a species of air-breathing land snail, a terrestrial pulmonate gastropod mollusc in the family Camaenidae. This species is endemic to Australia.
