= Trochidrobia inflata =

Conservation status
- Endangered (IUCN 2.3)

Scientific classification
- Kingdom: Animalia
- Phylum: Mollusca
- Class: Gastropoda
- Subclass: Caenogastropoda
- Order: Littorinimorpha
- Family: Tateidae
- Genus: Trochidrobia
- Species: T. inflata

Binomial name
- Trochidrobia inflata Ponder, Hershler & Jenkins, 1989

Species of gastropod

Trochidrobia inflata is a species of very small freshwater snail, an aquatic gastropod mollusk in the family Tateidae. This species is endemic to Australia. Trochidrobia inflata derives the name inflata from the inflated shell of this species.

== Anatomy and physiology ==
Trochidrobia inflata has a small umbilicus and a relatively high spire. This distinction is what distinguishes this species from other species of Trochidrobia genus. In addition, between Trochidrobia inflata and Trochidrobia minuta, which it shares the habitat with, T. inflata species has a larger size (up to 1.7 mm in maximum diameter), a wider umbilicus, and a taller spire. Trochidrobia inflata has a body volume of 0.00552 cm3 and a wet body mass of 0.00965 gram. This species moves similarly to other snails and slugs, by mucus mediated gliding. It has been found by Hershler and Jenkins (1989) that the mineralized skeleton of Trochidrobia inflata contains calcium carbonate, the same chemical compound that made up the shells in shellfishes. Trochidrobia inflata reproduces sexually.

== Ecology ==
Similar to other Trochidrobia species, T. inflata feeds on periphytic and epiphytic algae. Trochidrobia inflata species is also a part of essential dietary requirements for a number of animals; for instance cray fish, turtles, ducks, raccoons, muskrats, geese, otters, and fish. Trochidrobia inflata protects themselves by retracting into their shells through the opening of the shell called the operculum, similar to the defence mechanism of common molluscs such as snails.

== Life Cycle ==
Trochidrobia inflata has the same life cycle as common freshwater gastropods. As most freshwater gastropods, this species lays eggs which after approximately one week after the eggs are laid will hatch to become babies. The babies have perfectly formed biological and physiological functions, similar to adults. Then T. inflata will mature in four to seven weeks to become adults. Freshwater gastropods have a quite short life span, commonly in one year approximate. T. inflata species reproduces sexually, so the male species will mate with the female species.

== Distribution and habitat ==
Trochidrobia inflata main habitat is freshwater. T. inflata can be found in the shallow water in the lower parts of the artesian spring outflow. This species occurs in the same geographical area with T. minuta and species of Fonscochlea. The primary distribution of this species is the Freeling Springs complex, the Northern part of Lake Eyre supergroup in Northern South Australia (Hershler and Jenkins, 1989). Unlike other species of Trochidrobia genus or Fonscochlea genus, T. inflata can not be found in other spring water. This species exclusively populates the Freeling Springs complex, the Northern part of Lake Eyre supergroup in Northern South Australia, as found by Morton, Doherty & Barker in 1995.
