= Rhagada gibbensis =

Conservation status
- Vulnerable (IUCN 2.3)

Scientific classification
- Kingdom: Animalia
- Phylum: Mollusca
- Class: Gastropoda
- Order: Stylommatophora
- Family: Camaenidae
- Genus: Rhagada
- Species: R. gibbensis

Binomial name
- Rhagada gibbensis Solem, 1985

Species of gastropod

Rhagada gibbensis is a species of air-breathing land snail, a terrestrial pulmonate gastropod mollusc in the family Camaenidae. This species is endemic to Australia.
