= Austropyrgus pusillus =

Conservation status
- Least Concern (IUCN 3.1)

Scientific classification
- Kingdom: Animalia
- Phylum: Mollusca
- Class: Gastropoda
- Subclass: Caenogastropoda
- Order: Littorinimorpha
- Family: Tateidae
- Genus: Austropyrgus
- Species: A. pusillus

Binomial name
- Austropyrgus pusillus Clark, Miller & Ponder, 2003

Species of gastropod

Austropyrgus pusillus is a species of small freshwater snail with an operculum, an aquatic gastropod mollusc or micromollusc in the Hydrobiidae family. This species is endemic to western Victoria, Australia. It is found in small springs and streams that flow into the lower part of the Glenelg River.

== See also ==
- List of non-marine molluscs of Australia
