= Westrapyrgus =

Scientific classification
- Kingdom: Animalia
- Phylum: Mollusca
- Class: Gastropoda
- Subclass: Caenogastropoda
- Order: Littorinimorpha
- Family: Hydrobiidae
- Genus: Westrapyrgus; Ponder, Clark & Miller, 1999

Type species
- Westrapyrgus westralis Ponder, Clark & Miller, 1999

Genus of gastropods

Westrapyrgus is a genus of minute freshwater snails with an operculum, aquatic gastropod molluscs or micromolluscs in the family Hydrobiidae. The genus is endemic to south Western Australia. It is the first hydrobiid genus to be described from this state.

Morphologically, Westrapyrgus is most similar to the southeastern Australian hydrobiid genera Austropyrgus and Tatea.

== Species ==
The genus currently includes two recognised species:

- Westrapyrgus westralis Ponder, Clark & Miller, 1999
- Westrapyrgus slacksmithae Ponder, Clark & Miller, 1999
