= Austropyrgus bungoniensis =

Conservation status
- Least Concern (IUCN 3.1)

Scientific classification
- Kingdom: Animalia
- Phylum: Mollusca
- Class: Gastropoda
- Subclass: Caenogastropoda
- Order: Littorinimorpha
- Family: Tateidae
- Genus: Austropyrgus
- Species: A. bungoniensis

Binomial name
- Austropyrgus bungoniensis Clark, Miller & Ponder, 2003

Species of gastropod

Austropyrgus bungoniensis is a species of small freshwater snail with an operculum, an aquatic gastropod mollusc or micromollusc in the Hydrobiidae family. This species is endemic to southern New South Wales, Australia. It is known from streams and springs flowing from the Bungonia Gorge Caves.

== See also ==
- List of non-marine molluscs of Australia
