= Austropyrgus halletensis =

Conservation status
- Data Deficient (IUCN 3.1)

Scientific classification
- Kingdom: Animalia
- Phylum: Mollusca
- Class: Gastropoda
- Subclass: Caenogastropoda
- Order: Littorinimorpha
- Family: Tateidae
- Genus: Austropyrgus
- Species: A. halletensis

Binomial name
- Austropyrgus halletensis Clark, Miller & Ponder, 2003

Species of snail

Austropyrgus halletensis is a species of small freshwater snail with an operculum, an aquatic gastropod mollusc or micromollusc in the Hydrobiidae family. This species is endemic to South Australia, Australia. It is known from a small creek in the central Flinders Ranges.

== See also ==
- List of non-marine molluscs of Australia
