= Kimberleydiscus =

Scientific classification
- Kingdom: Animalia
- Phylum: Mollusca
- Class: Gastropoda
- Order: Stylommatophora
- Family: Camaenidae
- Subfamily: Hadrinae
- Genus: Kimberleydiscus; Köhler, 2010
- Species: K. fasciatus

Binomial name
- Kimberleydiscus fasciatus Köhler, 2010

Species of gastropod

Kimberleydiscus fasciatus is a species of air-breathing land snail, a terrestrial pulmonate gastropod mollusc in the family Camaenidae.

Kimberleydiscus fasciatus is the only species in the genus Kimberleydiscus.

The generic name Kimberleydiscus consist of "Kimberley", that is a region in Western Australia and of the suffix "-discus", that is from the Latin language (originally derived from the Greek word "diskos") and means disc, and it refers to the discoid shape of the shell. The specific name fasciatus is from the Latin language and means "banded".

== Distribution ==
The type locality of Kimberleydiscus fasciatus is the Bigge Island, Bonaparte Archipelago in north-western Kimberley, Western Australia. Because the species is only known from the type locality, it is considered to be endemic to Bigge Island.

== Shell description ==
Characteristic features of Kimberleydiscus fasciatus are the discoidal, low-spired shell with an open umbilicus. There are reddish brown spiral bands on the shell. The diameter of the shell is 18–22 mm.
