= Notopala =

Notopala Temporal range: Aptian-Recent

Scientific classification
- Kingdom: Animalia
- Phylum: Mollusca
- Class: Gastropoda
- Subclass: Caenogastropoda
- Order: Architaenioglossa
- Family: Viviparidae
- Subfamily: Bellamyinae
- Genus: Notopala; Cotton, 1935

Type species
- Paludina hanleyi Frauenfeld, 1864

Synonyms
- Notopalena Iredale, 1943

Genus of gastropods

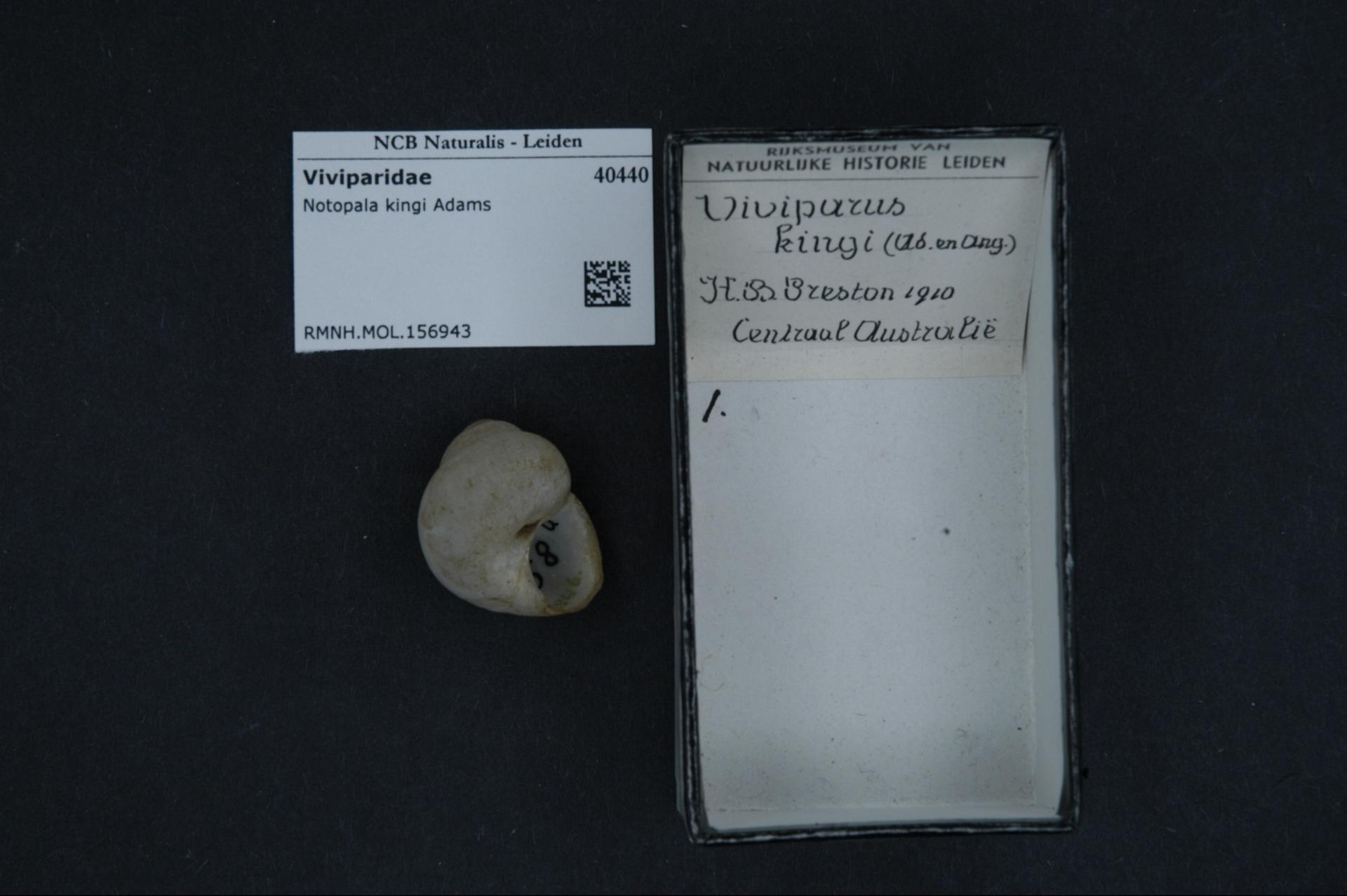
Notopala kingi Adams

Notopala is a genus of moderately large to large, freshwater snails with an operculum, aquatic gastropod molluscs in the family Viviparidae, the river snails or mystery snails.

== Description ==
The shell is dextral and globose-conic. The shell has up to five whorls. The aperture is subovate. The operculum is corneous and concentric. Colour is usually yellow, olive green, brown, cream or white and sometimes may have darker spiral bands. Head-foot with long tentacles with eyes on short processes at their outer bases; often pigmented with multiple different colours.

== Distribution ==
The genus Notopala is native to Australia. Notopala is found in all states and territories except Tasmania. It occurs throughout Queensland and New South Wales, northern Western Australia and Northern Territory and in the Murray-Darling Basin in Victoria and South Australia.

== Habitat and ecology ==
Generally occurs on fine sediment and/or on and under rocks and logs. Members of Notopala are thought to be grazers of periphyton and occur in slow moving or still waters. Some species are able to aestivate in mud during dry periods.

== Species ==
Species within the genus Notopala include:

- † Notopala albascopularis (Etheridge, 1902) - synonym: Viviparus (?) albascopularis Etheridge, 1902 - from Aptian, Wallumbilla Formation, New South Wales
- Notopala ampullaroides (Reeve, 1863)
- Notopala essingtonensis (Frauenfeld, 1862)
- Notopala hanleyi (Frauenfeld, 1864)
- Notopala kingi (A. Adams & Angas, 1864)
  - Notopala kingi kingi (A. Adams & Angas, 1864)
  - Notopala kingi suprafasciata (Tryon, 1866)
- Notopala sublineata Conrad, 1850
  - Notopala sublineata sublineata Conrad, 1850
  - Notopala sublineata alisoni (Brazier, 1979)
- † Notopala wanjacalda Cotton, 1935 - from upper Pleistocene near Sunnyside, South Australia
- Notopala waterhousii (Adams & Angus, 1864)
- Notopala tricincta (E. A. Smith, 1882)

Note:

"Banded species of Notopala occur in several parts of northern Australia and Queensland that are similar to N. essingtonensis, N. tricincta and N. kingi but are thought to be different species (W. Ponder, unpublished studies). These should be identified simply as Notopala sp."

The type species of the genus Notopala is Paludina hanleyi Frauenfeld, 1862, by original designation
