= Setobaudinia collingii =

Conservation status
- Least Concern (IUCN 2.3)

Scientific classification
- Kingdom: Animalia
- Phylum: Mollusca
- Class: Gastropoda
- Order: Stylommatophora
- Family: Camaenidae
- Genus: Setobaudinia
- Species: S. collingii

Binomial name
- Setobaudinia collingii Smith, 1893

Species of gastropod

Setobaudinia collingii is a species of air-breathing land snail, a terrestrial pulmonate gastropod mollusk in the family Camaenidae. This species is endemic to Australia.
