= Notopala sublineata =

Conservation status
- Endangered (IUCN 2.3)

Scientific classification
- Kingdom: Animalia
- Phylum: Mollusca
- Class: Gastropoda
- Subclass: Caenogastropoda
- Order: Architaenioglossa
- Family: Viviparidae
- Genus: Notopala
- Species: N. sublineata

Binomial name
- Notopala sublineata Conrad, 1850

Species of gastropod

Notopala sublineata is a species of large, freshwater snail with an operculum, an aquatic gastropod mollusc in the family Viviparidae, the river snails or mystery snails. This species is endemic to Australia.

== Subspecies ==
There are three subspecies of Notopala sublineata:

- Notopala sublineata sublineata Conrad, 1850
- Notopala sublineata alisoni
- Notopala sublineata hanleyi (Frauenfeld, 1864)
