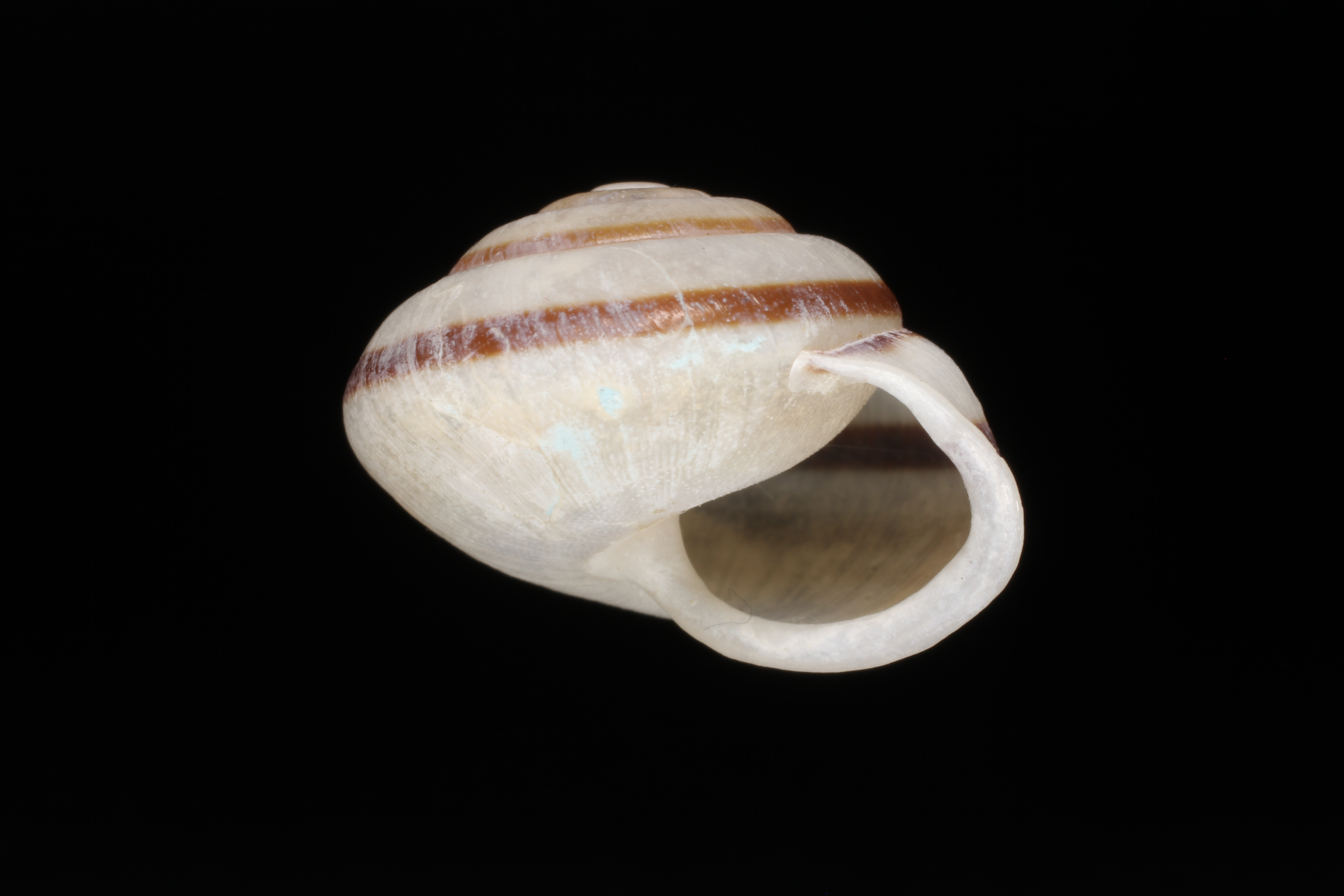
- Shell of Rhagada setzeri vietnamensis (holotype at MNHN, Paris)

Scientific classification
- Kingdom: Animalia
- Phylum: Mollusca
- Class: Gastropoda
- Order: Stylommatophora
- Superfamily: Helicoidea
- Family: Camaenidae
- Subfamily: Hadrinae
- Genus: Rhagada; Albers, 1860

Type species
- Helix reinga L. Pfeiffer, 1846

Synonyms
- Bellrhagada Iredale, 1938; Helix (Rhagada) Albers, 1860; Rhagada (Tumegada) Iredale, 1939 (junior synonym); Thersites (Rhagada) Albers, 1860; Tumegada Iredale, 1939 (junior synonym)

= Rhagada =

Genus of gastropods

Rhagada is a genus of air-breathing land snails, terrestrial pulmonate gastropod molluscs in the subfamily Hadrinae of the family Camaenidae.

== Species ==
Species within the genus Rhagada include:

- Rhagada abbasi Köhler, 2014
- Rhagada angulata Solem, 1997
- Rhagada barrowensis M. S. Johnson, Stankowski, Whisson, Teale & Hamilton, 2013
- Rhagada basedowana Iredale, 1939
- Rhagada biggeana Köhler, 2011
- Rhagada bulgana Solem, 1997
- Rhagada capensis Solem, 1997
- Rhagada colona (Martens, 1878)
- Rhagada construa Iredale, 1939
- Rhagada convicta (Cox, 1870)
- Rhagada crystalla Solem, 1985
- Rhagada cygna Solem, 1997
- Rhagada dominica Köhler, 2011
- Rhagada dringi (L. Pfeiffer, 1846)
- Rhagada elachystoma (Martens, 1878)
- Rhagada felicitas Köhler, 2011
- Rhagada floresiana (Martens, 1891)
- Rhagada gatta Iredale, 1939
- Rhagada gibbensis Solem, 1985
- Rhagada globosa Solem, 1997
- Rhagada harti Solem, 1985
- Rhagada karajarri Burghardt & Köhler, 2015
- Rhagada kessneri Köhler, 2011
- Rhagada marghitae Falconieri, 1995
- Rhagada mimika Iredale, 1939
- Rhagada ngurrana M. S. Johnson, Stankowski, Kendrick, Hamilton & Teale, 2016
- Rhagada pilbarana Solem, 1997
- Rhagada primigena Köhler, 2011
- Rhagada radleyi Preston, 1908
- Rhagada reinga (L. Pfeiffer, 1846)
- Rhagada richardsonii (E. A. Smith, 1874)
- Rhagada setzeri Maassen, 2009
- Rhagada sheai Köhler, 2011
- Rhagada solorensis (E. von Martens, 1863)
- Rhagada supracostulata (Schepman, 1892)
- Rhagada sutra Iredale, 1939
- Rhagada tescorum
- Rhagada torulus (Férussac, 1820)
- Rhagada worora Burghardt & Köhler, 2015
