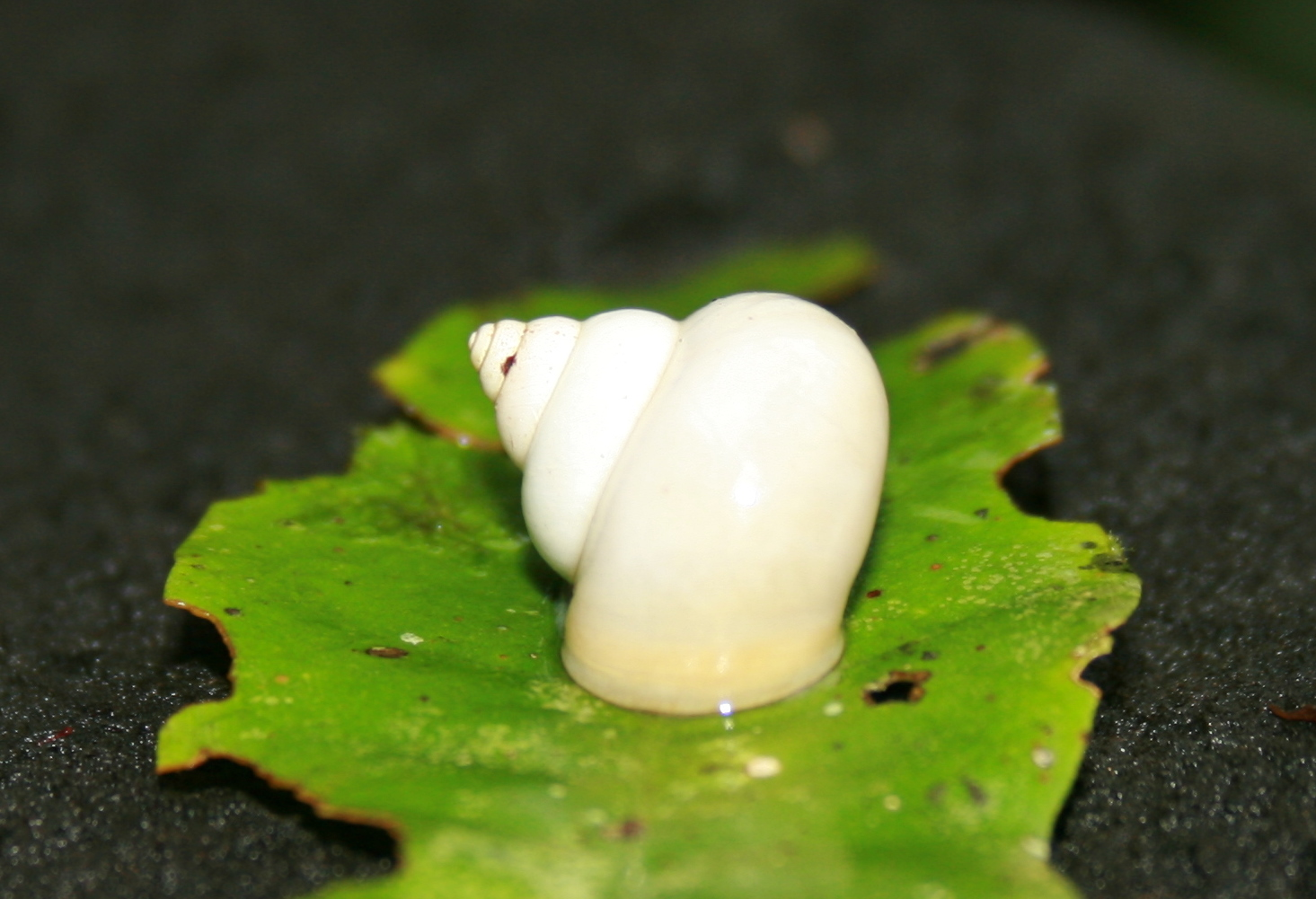
- A live individual of Noctepuna cereal resting on a leaf in Diwan, Queensland, Australia

Scientific classification
- Kingdom: Animalia
- Phylum: Mollusca
- Class: Gastropoda
- Order: Stylommatophora
- Family: Camaenidae
- Genus: Noctepuna
- Species: N. cerea

Binomial name
- Noctepuna cerea (Hedley, 1894)

Synonyms
- Papuina cerea Hedley, 1894

= Noctepuna cerea =

Species of mollusc

Noctepuna cerea is a species of air-breathing land snail, a terrestrial pulmonate gastropod mollusc in the family Camaenidae. This species is endemic to Australia.

== Description ==
Charles Hedley's original description of this species (based solely on the shell) is as follows:

Shell thin, translucent; contour trochoidal, color waxen white becoming yellowish on the 3rd and 4th whorls, encircled below the suture by an opaque white thread, nowhere are translucent lines or spaces visible. Sculpture: surface of a waxen polish; transverse growth lines can be detected by the unaided eye, and spiral grooves, almost effaced above but plainer on the base, may be deciphered with a lens. Whorls, flattened, regularly increasing, the last constituting five-eighths of the shell's height, angled at the periphery, descending considerably and abruptly at the aperture, gibbous at the point of flexure. Suture impressed. Aperture very oblique, anterior margin waved; columella oblique, wide, extending nearly to the angle of the aperture, subtruncate below. A thin, translucent, shining callus extends over the imperforate axis to the insertion of the anterior margin of the lip.

Height 13.5, major, diam. 16, min. diam. 14 mm.

Hab. Bloomfield River, North Queensland.
