= Austropyrgus elongatus =

Conservation status
- Data Deficient (IUCN 3.1)

Scientific classification
- Kingdom: Animalia
- Phylum: Mollusca
- Class: Gastropoda
- Subclass: Caenogastropoda
- Order: Littorinimorpha
- Family: Tateidae
- Genus: Austropyrgus
- Species: A. elongatus

Binomial name
- Austropyrgus elongatus (May, 1921)

Synonyms
- Fluvidona elongatus Smith, 1992; Potamopyrgus elongatus May, 1921; Pupiphryx elongatus Iredale, 1943

Species of gastropod

Austropyrgus elongatus is a species of small freshwater snail with an operculum, an aquatic gastropod mollusc or micromollusc in the Hydrobiidae family. This species is endemic to eastern Tasmania, Australia. It is only known from one location on Apsley River.

== See also ==
- List of non-marine molluscs of Australia
