= Notopala hanleyi =

Scientific classification
- Domain: Eukaryota
- Kingdom: Animalia
- Phylum: Mollusca
- Class: Gastropoda
- Subclass: Caenogastropoda
- Order: Architaenioglossa
- Family: Viviparidae
- Genus: Notopala
- Species: N. hanleyi

Binomial name
- Notopala hanleyi (Frauenfeld, 1864)

Synonyms
- Paludina hanleyi Frauenfeld, 1864; Paludina (Vivipara) purpurea Martens, 1865

Species of gastropod

Notopala hanleyi is a species of large freshwater snail, an aquatic gastropod mollusc in the family Viviparidae. It is also classified as a subspecies Notopala sublineata hanleyi.

This species is endemic to Australia and is found across the Murray-Darling basin.

This species was thought to be extinct, but one population has been found in pipeline in 1993.

It feeds on microbial and organic matter.
