= Setobaudinia =

Scientific classification
- Kingdom: Animalia
- Phylum: Mollusca
- Class: Gastropoda
- Order: Stylommatophora
- Family: Camaenidae
- Genus: Setobaudinia; Iredale, 1933

Genus of gastropods

Setobaudinia is a genus of air-breathing land snails, terrestrial pulmonate gastropod mollusks in the family Camaenidae.

== Species ==
Species within the genus Setobaudinia include:

- Setobaudinia collingii
- Setobaudinia spina
- Setobaudinia victoriana
- Setobaudinia umbadayi
