= Jardinella tumorosa =

Scientific classification
- Kingdom: Animalia
- Phylum: Mollusca
- Class: Gastropoda
- Subclass: Caenogastropoda
- Order: Littorinimorpha
- Family: Tateidae
- Genus: Jardinella
- Species: J. tumorosa

Binomial name
- Jardinella tumorosa Ponder, 1991

Species of gastropod

Jardinella tumorosa is a species of small freshwater snail with an operculum, an aquatic gastropod mollusc or micromollusc in the family Tateidae.

This species is endemic to Queensland, Australia, where it occurs in the Mulgrave river system.

== See also ==
- List of non-marine molluscs of Australia
