= Austropyrgus tateiformis =

Conservation status
- Data Deficient (IUCN 3.1)

Scientific classification
- Kingdom: Animalia
- Phylum: Mollusca
- Class: Gastropoda
- Subclass: Caenogastropoda
- Order: Littorinimorpha
- Family: Tateidae
- Genus: Austropyrgus
- Species: A. tateiformis

Binomial name
- Austropyrgus tateiformis Clark, Miller & Ponder, 2003

Species of gastropod

Austropyrgus tateiformis is a species of small freshwater snail with an operculum, an aquatic gastropod mollusc or micromollusc in the Hydrobiidae family. This species is endemic to northwestern Tasmania, Australia. It is only known from its type locality near Arthur River.

== See also ==
- List of non-marine molluscs of Australia
