= Austropyrgus sinuatus =

Conservation status
- Least Concern (IUCN 3.1)

Scientific classification
- Kingdom: Animalia
- Phylum: Mollusca
- Class: Gastropoda
- Subclass: Caenogastropoda
- Order: Littorinimorpha
- Family: Tateidae
- Genus: Austropyrgus
- Species: A. sinuatus

Binomial name
- Austropyrgus sinuatus Clark, Miller & Ponder, 2003

Species of gastropod

Austropyrgus sinuatus is a species of small freshwater snail with an operculum, an aquatic gastropod mollusc or micromollusc in the Hydrobiidae family. This species is endemic to western Victoria, Australia. It is known from only one location on Mount Emu Creek, south of Terang.

== See also ==
- List of non-marine molluscs of Australia
