= Austropyrgus parvus =

Conservation status
- Least Concern (IUCN 3.1)

Scientific classification
- Kingdom: Animalia
- Phylum: Mollusca
- Class: Gastropoda
- Subclass: Caenogastropoda
- Order: Littorinimorpha
- Family: Tateidae
- Genus: Austropyrgus
- Species: A. parvus

Binomial name
- Austropyrgus parvus Clark, Miller & Ponder, 2003

Species of gastropod

Austropyrgus parvus is a species of small freshwater snail with an operculum, an aquatic gastropod mollusc or micromollusc in the Hydrobiidae family. This species is endemic to southwestern Tasmania, Australia. It is known from several locations on the lower Franklin River.

== See also ==
- List of non-marine molluscs of Australia
