= Austropyrgus foris =

Conservation status
- Near Threatened (IUCN 3.1)

Scientific classification
- Kingdom: Animalia
- Phylum: Mollusca
- Class: Gastropoda
- Subclass: Caenogastropoda
- Order: Littorinimorpha
- Family: Tateidae
- Genus: Austropyrgus
- Species: A. foris

Binomial name
- Austropyrgus foris (Ponder, Colgan, Clark, Miller & Terzis, 1994)

Synonyms
- Fluvidona foris Ponder, Colgan, Clark, Miller & Terzis, 1994

Species of gastropod

Austropyrgus foris is a species of small freshwater snail with an operculum, an aquatic gastropod mollusc or micromollusc in the Hydrobiidae family. This species is endemic to eastern Victoria, Australia. It is only known from a small stream at Cape Liptrap, near Waratah Bay.

== See also ==
- List of non-marine molluscs of Australia
