= Jardinella thaanumi =

Conservation status
- Data Deficient (IUCN 3.1)

Scientific classification
- Kingdom: Animalia
- Phylum: Mollusca
- Class: Gastropoda
- Subclass: Caenogastropoda
- Order: Littorinimorpha
- Family: Tateidae
- Genus: Jardinella
- Species: J. thaanumi

Binomial name
- Jardinella thaanumi (Pilsbry, 1900)

Synonyms
- Petterdiana thaanumi Pilsbry, 1900

Species of gastropod

Jardinella thaanumi is a species of small freshwater snail with an operculum, an aquatic gastropod mollusc or micromollusc in the family Tateidae.

This species is endemic to Queensland, Australia, where it occurs in the Barron and Johnstone river systems.

J. thaanumi is the type species for the genus Jardinella.

== See also ==
- List of non-marine molluscs of Australia
