= Austropyrgus salvus =

Conservation status
- Least Concern (IUCN 3.1)

Scientific classification
- Kingdom: Animalia
- Phylum: Mollusca
- Class: Gastropoda
- Subclass: Caenogastropoda
- Order: Littorinimorpha
- Family: Tateidae
- Genus: Austropyrgus
- Species: A. salvus

Binomial name
- Austropyrgus salvus Clark, Miller & Ponder, 2003

Species of gastropod

Austropyrgus salvus is a species of small freshwater snail with an operculum, an aquatic gastropod mollusc or micromollusc in the Hydrobiidae family. This species is endemic to southwestern Tasmania, Australia. It is known from the lower parts of the Franklin River and the upper parts of the Gordon River.

== See also ==
- List of non-marine molluscs of Australia
