= Austropyrgus ora =

Conservation status
- Least Concern (IUCN 3.1)

Scientific classification
- Kingdom: Animalia
- Phylum: Mollusca
- Class: Gastropoda
- Subclass: Caenogastropoda
- Order: Littorinimorpha
- Family: Tateidae
- Genus: Austropyrgus
- Species: A. ora

Binomial name
- Austropyrgus ora Clark, Miller & Ponder, 2003

Species of gastropod

Austropyrgus ora is a species of small freshwater snail with an operculum, an aquatic gastropod mollusc or micromollusc in the Hydrobiidae family. This species is endemic to eastern Victoria and southern New South Wales, Australia.

== See also ==
- List of non-marine molluscs of Australia
