= Austropyrgus niger =

Conservation status
- Least Concern (IUCN 3.1)

Scientific classification
- Kingdom: Animalia
- Phylum: Mollusca
- Class: Gastropoda
- Subclass: Caenogastropoda
- Order: Littorinimorpha
- Family: Tateidae
- Genus: Austropyrgus
- Species: A. niger

Binomial name
- Austropyrgus niger (Quoy & Gaimard, 1834)

Synonyms
- Fluvidona nigra Smith, 1992; Hydrobia nigra Frauenfeld, 1864; Paludina nigra Quoy & Gaimard, 1834

Species of gastropod

Austropyrgus niger is a species of small freshwater snail with an operculum, an aquatic gastropod mollusc or micromollusc in the family Hydrobiidae. This species is endemic to southeastern Tasmania, Australia. It is found in small coastal streams along the D'Entrecasteaux Channel.

== See also ==
- List of non-marine molluscs of Australia
