= Austropyrgus smithii =

Conservation status
- Least Concern (IUCN 3.1)

Scientific classification
- Kingdom: Animalia
- Phylum: Mollusca
- Class: Gastropoda
- Subclass: Caenogastropoda
- Order: Littorinimorpha
- Family: Tateidae
- Genus: Austropyrgus
- Species: A. smithii

Binomial name
- Austropyrgus smithii (Petterd, 1889)

Synonyms
- Bithynella smithii Johnston, 1891; Fluvidona smithii Smith, 1992; Potamopyrgus smithii Petterd, 1889; Pupiphryx smithii May, 1958

Species of gastropod

Austropyrgus smithii is a species of small freshwater snail with an operculum, an aquatic gastropod mollusc or micromollusc in the Hydrobiidae family. This species is endemic to western Tasmania, Australia, and is found in a number of small rivers and streams.

== See also ==
- List of non-marine molluscs of Australia
