= Austropyrgus grampianensis =

Conservation status
- Near Threatened (IUCN 3.1)

Scientific classification
- Kingdom: Animalia
- Phylum: Mollusca
- Class: Gastropoda
- Subclass: Caenogastropoda
- Order: Littorinimorpha
- Family: Tateidae
- Genus: Austropyrgus
- Species: A. grampianensis

Binomial name
- Austropyrgus grampianensis (Gabriel, 1939)

Synonyms
- Angrobia grampianensis Gabriel, 1939; Fluvidona grampianensis Smith, 1992; Pupiphryx grampianensis Iredale, 1943

Species of gastropod

Austropyrgus grampianensis is a species of small freshwater snail with an operculum, an aquatic gastropod mollusk or micromollusk in the Hydrobiidae family. This species is endemic to western Victoria, Australia. It is known from two small creeks in the Grampians.

== See also ==
- List of non-marine molluscs of Australia
