= Austropyrgus nepeanensis =

Conservation status
- Near Threatened (IUCN 3.1)

Scientific classification
- Kingdom: Animalia
- Phylum: Mollusca
- Class: Gastropoda
- Subclass: Caenogastropoda
- Order: Littorinimorpha
- Family: Tateidae
- Genus: Austropyrgus
- Species: A. nepeanensis

Binomial name
- Austropyrgus nepeanensis Clark, Miller & Ponder, 2003

Species of gastropod

Austropyrgus nepeanensis is a species of small freshwater snail with an operculum, an aquatic gastropod mollusc or micromollusc in the Hydrobiidae family. This species is endemic to New South Wales, Australia. It is known from a few small tributaries of the Nepean River in western and south western Sydney.

== See also ==
- List of non-marine molluscs of Australia
