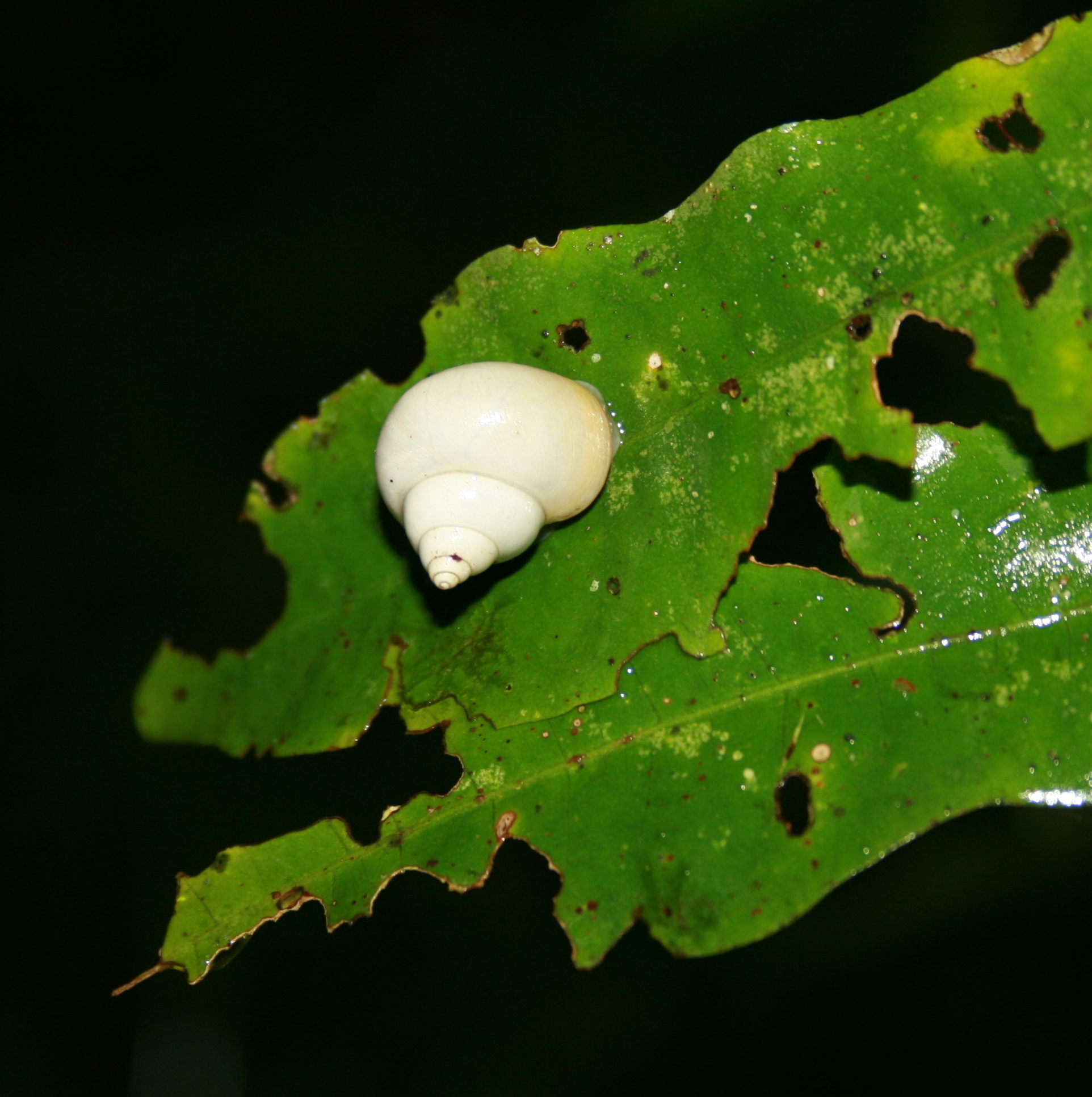
- A live individual of Noctepuna cerea resting on a leaf in Diwan, Queensland, Australia

Scientific classification
- Kingdom: Animalia
- Phylum: Mollusca
- Class: Gastropoda
- Order: Stylommatophora
- Family: Camaenidae
- Genus: Noctepuna; Iredale, 1933

= Noctepuna =

Genus of gastropods

Noctepuna is a genus of air-breathing land snails, terrestrial pulmonate gastropod mollusks in the family Camaenidae.

== Species ==
Species within the genus Noctepuna include:

- Noctepuna muensis (Hedley, 1912)
- Noctepuna cerea (Hedley, 1894)
- Noctepuna mayana (Hedley, 1899)
