= Austropyrgus tumidus =

Conservation status
- Least Concern (IUCN 3.1)

Scientific classification
- Kingdom: Animalia
- Phylum: Mollusca
- Class: Gastropoda
- Subclass: Caenogastropoda
- Order: Littorinimorpha
- Family: Tateidae
- Genus: Austropyrgus
- Species: A. tumidus

Binomial name
- Austropyrgus tumidus Clark, Miller & Ponder, 2003

Species of gastropod

Austropyrgus tumidus is a species of small freshwater snail with an operculum, an aquatic gastropod mollusc or micromollusc in the Hydrobiidae family. This species is endemic to western Victoria, Australia. It is known from a few small springs and streams that flow into the lower part of the Glenelg River.

== See also ==
- List of non-marine molluscs of Australia
