= Austropyrgus eumekes =

Conservation status
- Least Concern (IUCN 3.1)

Scientific classification
- Kingdom: Animalia
- Phylum: Mollusca
- Class: Gastropoda
- Subclass: Caenogastropoda
- Order: Littorinimorpha
- Family: Tateidae
- Genus: Austropyrgus
- Species: A. eumekes

Binomial name
- Austropyrgus eumekes Clark, Miller & Ponder, 2003

Species of gastropod

Austropyrgus eumekes is a species of small freshwater snail with an operculum, an aquatic gastropod mollusc or micromollusc in the Hydrobiidae family. This species is endemic to western Victoria, Australia. It is only known from several locations on Darlot Creek, a tributary of the Fitzroy River.

== See also ==
- List of non-marine molluscs of Australia
