= Setobaudinia spina =

Conservation status
- Vulnerable (IUCN 2.3)

Scientific classification
- Kingdom: Animalia
- Phylum: Mollusca
- Class: Gastropoda
- Order: Stylommatophora
- Family: Camaenidae
- Genus: Setobaudinia
- Species: S. spina

Binomial name
- Setobaudinia spina (Solem, 1985)

Species of gastropod

Setobaudinia spina is a species of air-breathing land snails, terrestrial pulmonate gastropod mollusks. This species is endemic to Australia.
