= Austropyrgus rectoides =

Conservation status
- Least Concern (IUCN 3.1)

Scientific classification
- Kingdom: Animalia
- Phylum: Mollusca
- Class: Gastropoda
- Subclass: Caenogastropoda
- Order: Littorinimorpha
- Family: Tateidae
- Genus: Austropyrgus
- Species: A. rectoides

Binomial name
- Austropyrgus rectoides Clark, Miller & Ponder, 2003

Species of gastropod

Austropyrgus rectoides is a species of small freshwater snail with an operculum, an aquatic gastropod mollusc or micromollusc in the Hydrobiidae family. This species is endemic to Tasmania, Australia. It is found in small coastal rivers and streams in northern and western Tasmania and also on Hunter Island.

== See also ==
- List of non-marine molluscs of Australia
