= Jardinella tullyensis =

Scientific classification
- Kingdom: Animalia
- Phylum: Mollusca
- Class: Gastropoda
- Subclass: Caenogastropoda
- Order: Littorinimorpha
- Family: Tateidae
- Genus: Jardinella
- Species: J. tullyensis

Binomial name
- Jardinella tullyensis Ponder, 1991

Species of gastropod

Jardinella tullyensis is a species of small freshwater snail with an operculum, an aquatic gastropod mollusc or micromollusc in the family Tateidae.

This species is endemic to Queensland, Australia, where it occurs in the Tully river system.

== See also ==
- List of non-marine molluscs of Australia
