= Austropyrgus colensis =

Conservation status
- Near Threatened (IUCN 3.1)

Scientific classification
- Kingdom: Animalia
- Phylum: Mollusca
- Class: Gastropoda
- Subclass: Caenogastropoda
- Order: Littorinimorpha
- Family: Tateidae
- Genus: Austropyrgus
- Species: A. colensis

Binomial name
- Austropyrgus colensis Clark, Miller & Ponder, 2003

Species of gastropod

Austropyrgus colensis is a species of small freshwater snail with an operculum, an aquatic gastropod mollusc or micromollusc in the Hydrobiidae family. This species is endemic to western Victoria, Australia. It is known from a single location, a few small streams on Mount Cole.

== See also ==
- List of non-marine molluscs of Australia
