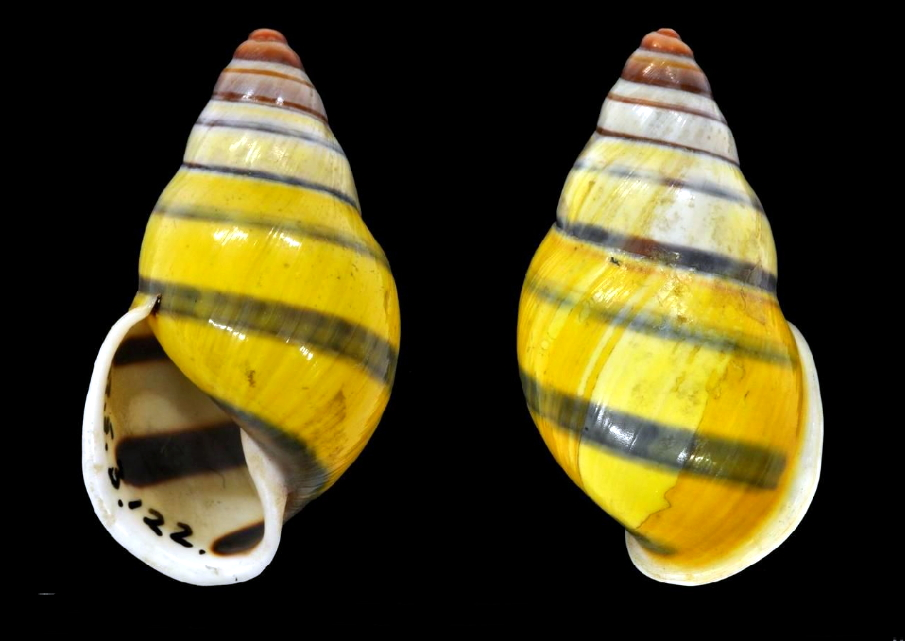
- Shell of Amphidromus cognatus (lectotype at the Natural History Museum, London)

Conservation status
- Endangered (IUCN 3.1)

Scientific classification
- Kingdom: Animalia
- Phylum: Mollusca
- Class: Gastropoda
- Order: Stylommatophora
- Family: Camaenidae
- Genus: Amphidromus
- Species: A. cognatus

Binomial name
- Amphidromus cognatus Fulton, 1907

= Amphidromus cognatus =

Species of gastropod

Amphidromus cognatus, the cognate land snail, is a large camaenid land snail endemic to Australia.

== Description ==
Amphidromus cognatus is large, with a shell length ranging from 21–33 mm (0.83–1.30 in) and a diameter of 12–17 mm (0.47–0.67 in).

(Original description) The sinistral shell is moderately solid, minutely perforate and smooth. It is glossy with a whitish base obscured on the lower whorls by a bright yellow periostracum. The shell contains approximately six slightly convex whorls; the initial two dark reddish-brown, the subsequent whorls bearing narrow, dark bluish-grey spiral bands: one at the suture, one above the mid-whorl, and three on the body whorl (one peripheral band about 2 mm wide, a similar band encircling the umbilicus, and a narrow band about 2 mm below the suture). The growth lines are rather conspicuous.The white aperture is subovate, with the outer band clearly visible through the shell. The peristome is white and moderately expanded.

The ground colour of its shell is yellow, often with a peripheral spiral brown band, a purplish apical suffusion and a light yellow or white lip.

== Distribution ==
Amphidromus cognatus has only been found in a restricted geographic range in Australia's Northern Territory.

The snail was first described in 1907, from three specimens found at Port Essington on the Cobourg Peninsula before 1850, although it was not found there since. Several sightings were made between 1976 and 1980, at one site on Bathurst Island and three sites at Melville Island.

== Conservation status ==
Amphidromus cognatus is considered Endangered by the IUCN (World Conservation Union). The species is not listed on the Australian government's list of threatened fauna, but the Northern Territory government considers it Vulnerable.
