= Kimberleymelon =

Scientific classification
- Kingdom: Animalia
- Phylum: Mollusca
- Class: Gastropoda
- Order: Stylommatophora
- Family: Camaenidae
- Subfamily: Hadrinae
- Genus: Kimberleymelon; Köhler, 2010
- Species: K. tealei

Binomial name
- Kimberleymelon tealei Köhler, 2010

Genus of gastropods

Kimberleymelon tealei is a species of air-breathing land snail, a terrestrial pulmonate gastropod mollusk in the family Camaenidae. Kimberleymelon tealei is the only species in the genus Kimberleymelon.

The generic name Kimberleymelon consists of "Kimberley" which is a region in Western Australia, and the suffix "-melon" which is from the Greek language meaning melon, the fleshy fruit of the family Cucurbitaceae, a reference to the globular shape of the shell. The specific name "tealei" is in honor of Roy Teale, the malacologist who collected the holotype of this species.

== Distribution ==
The type locality of Kimberleymelon tealei is Middle Osborn Island, Bonaparte Archipelago in north-western Kimberley, Western Australia. This species is endemic to Middle Osborn Island.

== Shell description ==
The shell is of trochiform shape, high-spired and has a closed umbilicus. The shell dimensions are 20–28 mm in diameter and 18–26 mm in height.
