= Austropyrgus dyerianus =

Conservation status
- Vulnerable (IUCN 2.3)

Scientific classification
- Kingdom: Animalia
- Phylum: Mollusca
- Class: Gastropoda
- Subclass: Caenogastropoda
- Order: Littorinimorpha
- Family: Tateidae
- Genus: Austropyrgus
- Species: A. dyerianus

Binomial name
- Austropyrgus dyerianus (Petterd, 1879)

Synonyms
- Bithynia dyeriana Petterd, 1879; Bithynia dyeriana Tate & Brazier, 1881; Bithynella dyeriana Johnston, 1891; Potamopyrgus dyeriana May, 1921; Pupiphryx dyeriana Iredale, 1943; Fluvidona dyeriana Smith, 1992

Species of gastropod

Austropyrgus dyerianus is a species of small freshwater snail with an operculum, an aquatic gastropod mollusk or micromollusk in the Hydrobiidae family. This species is endemic to Australia.

== See also ==
- List of non-marine molluscs of Australia
