= Austroassiminea =

Scientific classification
- Domain: Eukaryota
- Kingdom: Animalia
- Phylum: Mollusca
- Class: Gastropoda
- Subclass: Caenogastropoda
- Order: Littorinimorpha
- Family: Assimineidae
- Genus: Austroassiminea

species
- See text

Genus of gastropods

Austroassiminea is a genus of minute, salt marsh snails with an operculum, aquatic gastropod mollusks, or micromollusks, in the family Assimineidae.

== Species ==
Species in the genus Austroassiminea:

- Austroassiminea letha
