= Springvalia =

Scientific classification
- Kingdom: Animalia
- Phylum: Mollusca
- Class: Gastropoda
- Subclass: Caenogastropoda
- Order: Littorinimorpha
- Superfamily: Truncatelloidea
- Family: Tateidae
- Genus: Springvalia; Ponder & G. A. Clark, 1990

Type species
- Jardinella isolata Ponder & G. A. Clark, 1990

Genus of gastropods

Springvalia is a genus of small freshwater snails, aquatic gastropod mollusks in the family Tateidae.

== Species ==
- Springvalia isolata (Ponder & G. A. Clark, 1990)
