= Caldicochlea harrisi =

Conservation status
- Least Concern (IUCN 3.1)

Scientific classification
- Kingdom: Animalia
- Phylum: Mollusca
- Class: Gastropoda
- Subclass: Caenogastropoda
- Order: Littorinimorpha
- Superfamily: Truncatelloidea
- Family: Tateidae
- Genus: Caldicochlea
- Species: C. harrisi

Binomial name
- Caldicochlea harrisi (Ponder, Colgan, Terzis, Clark & Miller, 1996)

Synonyms
- Dalhousia harrisi Ponder, Colgan, Terzis, S. A. Clark & A. C. Miller, 1996 · unaccepted (original combination)

Species of freshwater mollusc

Caldicochlea harrisi is a species of freshwater mollusc in the family Tateidae.

The species was first described in 1996 as Dalhousia harrisi by Winston Ponder, Donald Colgan, T. Terzis, Stephanie Clark and Alison Miller. However, the genus name of Dalhousia had already been used, and thus in 1997, Ponder published the replacement genus name of Caldicochlea.

== Description ==
The snails are tiny (adults from 2.3 to 3.8mm) and vary highly in shell shape, making them hard to distinguish on shell morphology from C. globosa, but C. harrisi is usually smaller and more conical.

== Distribution ==
It is endemic to the Dalhousie Springs of the Great Artesian Basin.

== Habitat ==
These snails are found in a range of habitats: small cold seeps (20°C), large warm to hot pools (to 43°C), and on the edges of large pools where they are not reachable by catfish (known to eat tateid snails).
