= Austroassiminea letha =

Conservation status
- Endangered (IUCN 3.1)

Scientific classification
- Kingdom: Animalia
- Phylum: Mollusca
- Class: Gastropoda
- Subclass: Caenogastropoda
- Order: Littorinimorpha
- Family: Assimineidae
- Genus: Austroassiminea
- Species: A. letha

Binomial name
- Austroassiminea letha Solem, Girardi, Slack-Smith & Kendall, 1982

Species of gastropod

Austroassiminea letha is a species of small salt marsh snails with an operculum, aquatic gastropod mollusks, or micromollusks in the family Assimineidae. This species is endemic to Australia.
