= Carnarvoncochlea exigua =

Jardinella exigua

Conservation status
- Endangered (IUCN 3.1)

Scientific classification
- Kingdom: Animalia
- Phylum: Mollusca
- Class: Gastropoda
- Subclass: Caenogastropoda
- Order: Littorinimorpha
- Family: Tateidae
- Genus: Carnarvoncochlea
- Species: C. exigua

Binomial name
- Carnarvoncochlea exigua Ponder & Clark, 1990

Synonyms
- Jardinella exigua Ponder & G. A. Clark, 1990 (basionym)

Species of gastropods

Carnarvonchochlea exigua, previously classified as Jardinella exigua, is a small freshwater snail residing in North East Queensland, near Carnarvon Gorge. Carnarvoncochlea refers to the location of origin, whilst exigua derives from the Latin word "exigus" meaning "small".

== Description ==
C. exigua is a relatively small snail, with their shells only ranging between 1.2 and 1.7mm. The shell itself is translucent and thin, with its colour ranging from a pale orange-brown colour, to being completely colourless. It is quite smooth and less textured than most other snails in its genus. It has a trochiform shell, with a flattened base and an evenly conical spiral shape. The foot of the snail appears triangular in size and is generally not pigmented, with the exception of one patch of black behind the eye, and a few smaller patches around the snout. The sides of the foot are grey in colour. The radula of the snail consists of simple, concave teeth covering a tongue-like structure. One of C. exigua's more defining characteristics would be its operculum. It is quite thin and pale yellow in colour. It is also uniquely narrow in comparison to other gastropods, with it only ranging within 0.7-0.92mm in length. Both males and females are not sexually dimorphic, with both genders having the same shell structure, colouring and proportions. The only point of differentiation between them is the presence of reproductive organs. Uniquely, most females of this species contain a rudimentary penis, a trait only shared with Carnovonochlea carnobonensis, and occasionally Judinella jesswiseae.

== Habitat and distribution ==
This species of snail is endemic to North Eastern Queensland, particularly in regions close to, or in, the Carnarvon Gorge National Park and Carnarvon Station Reserve. This region also resides in the Brigalow Belt bioregion. In 1984, C. exigua samples were found in three small springs between Dooloogarah, Carnarvon Gorge National Park and Carnarvon Station Reserve. After revisiting the region in 2007, more samples were collected in Fig Tree Spring, Orange tree spring, Long Gully spring and Ti Tree spring. The waterways are mainly found in isolated, densely forested regions. Its habitat is also well known for having high levels of biodiversity, with many endemic insect and plant species being present.

Specifically, specimens of C. exigua reside in short, shallow streams consisting of silty sediments with a light current. Due to the streams originating from underground, the water quality is high, and as such is mostly unpolluted.

== Reproduction and adaptations ==
=== Reproduction ===
In comparison to other similar gastropod species, the C. exigua has uniquely simplistic organs for the act of reproduction. The males of the species lack a bursa copulatrix, a type of sac that stores and deposits sperm. In both genders, the reproductive organs lack complexity, with the genitalia lacking specific organs that are typically found in other similar species.‌

=== Adaptations ===
The presence of rudimentary male reproductive organs within the females of this species is unique, and is generally only found in snail species that live in estuaries that are not a part of the Great Artesian Basin. It is currently unknown why this occurs.

== Conservation status ==
According to the IUCN, C. exigua is considered endangered. This can be attributed to the snail's very niche distribution, and the variety of threats that it is subjected to. One of the major threats listed is the impact of livestock. Due to C. exigua being located near Carnarvon station, a region that was used as a cattle station for over 140 years, faecal matter and waste products from cattle can make their way into waterways, leading to algal blooms and water pollution. Livestock is also known to trample native grasses and degrade the banks of small springs, like the ones C. exigua resides in. Creating bores, or digging holes near nearby estuaries, is another threat to this species' habitat. This has led to multiple springs becoming inactive, due to them altering the flow of water. Similarly, the excavation of local springs will also cause issues, as it erodes the banks of the estuaries, degrading the habitat of many freshwater snail species. Introduced species, including plants such as Urochloa mutica, marine invertebrates such as mosquitofish and feral animals like pigs, have all been shown to disrupt ecosystems dependent on small streams and springs. The region is also prone to bushfires.

However, there are efforts being made to improve the quality and longevity of waterways in the region. This involves active efforts to talk to local stakeholders such as farmers, on ways they can preserve springs on their property. There are also efforts to increase the health of waterways, such as restricting livestock access to springs, and continuous monitoring from researchers, and implementing policies that will control the movements of introduced species.

== Similar species ==
There are many other species that are quite similar to C. exigua. C.carnovornensis shares many of the same physical characteristics, only differentiating in differences with certain reproductive organs, operculum thickness and overall size. Since C. exigua used to be classified within the Jardinella Genus. As such, it has a lot of similarities to most other species in said genus, including, habitat, distribution, shell size and colouring and other general traits. However, it is still somewhat distinct from Jardinella, as indicated by the change in classification. The change in classification was due to the snail species having its rectum being arc-like in shape, a trait not shared by species in the Jardinella genus.‌ All snail species in the general region near Carnarvon National Park and Dooloogarah are considered C. exigua by default.‌ There is potential for variation of species within this classification, but this requires more future research into the gastropod.‌

This species is endemic to Australia.

== See also ==
- List of non-marine molluscs of Australia
