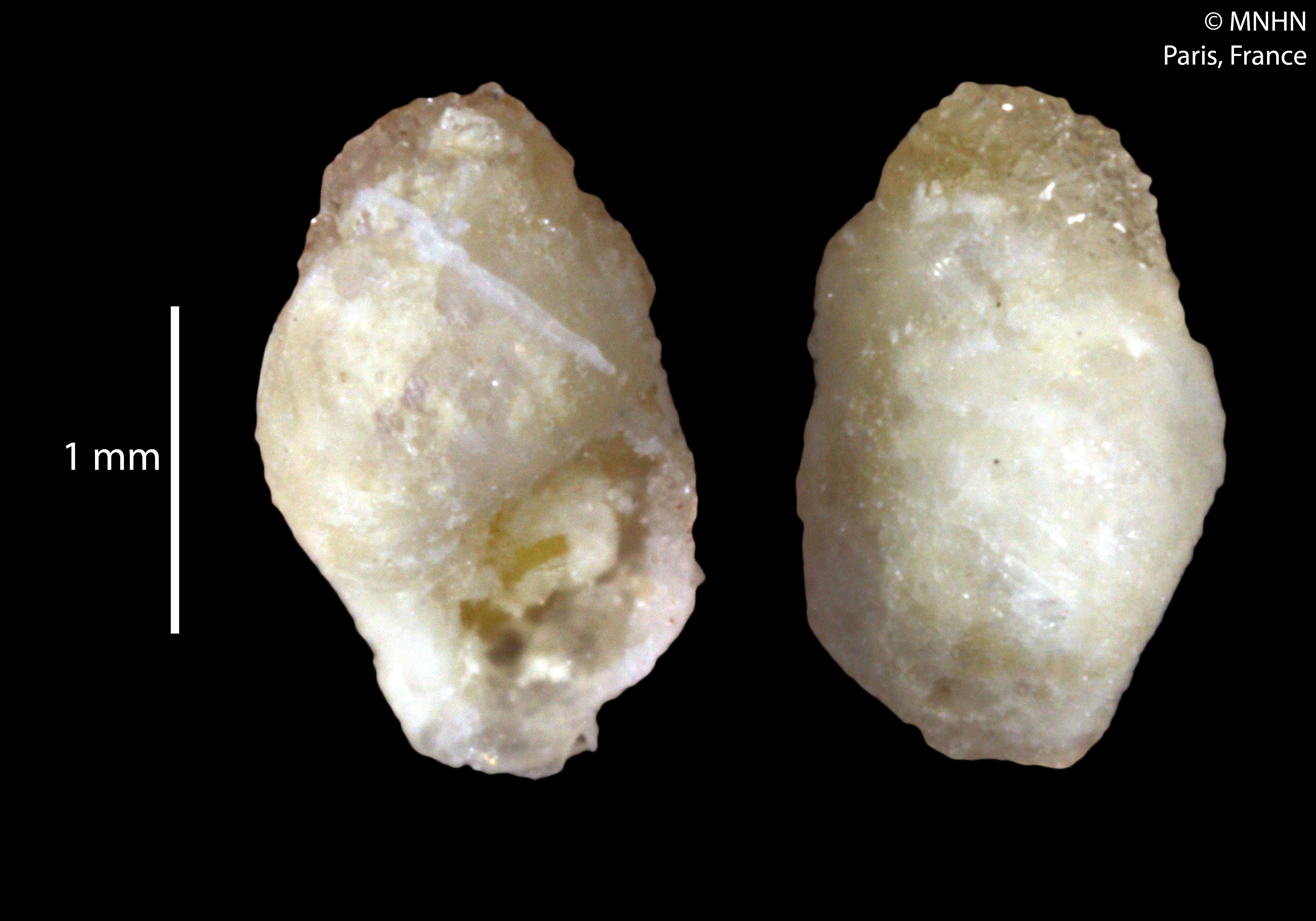
- Shell of Pseudotricula eberhardi (paratype at MNHN, Paris)

Scientific classification
- Kingdom: Animalia
- Phylum: Mollusca
- Class: Gastropoda
- Subclass: Caenogastropoda
- Order: Littorinimorpha
- Superfamily: Truncatelloidea
- Family: Tateidae
- Genus: Pseudotricula; Ponder, 1992

Type species
- Pseudotricula eberhardi Ponder, 1992

= Pseudotricula =

Genus of gastropods

Pseudotricula is a genus of minute freshwater snails with an operculum, aquatic gastropod molluscs or micromolluscs in the family Tateidae. The genus was first described in 1992 by Winston Ponder.

== Species ==
- Pseudotricula arthurclarkei Ponder, S. A. Clark, Eberhard & Studdert, 2005
- Pseudotricula auriforma Ponder, S. A. Clark, Eberhard & Studdert, 2005
- Pseudotricula conica Ponder, S. A. Clark, Eberhard & Studdert, 2005
- Pseudotricula eberhardi Ponder, 1992
- Pseudotricula elongata Ponder, S. A. Clark, Eberhard & Studdert, 2005
- Pseudotricula expandolabra Ponder, S. A. Clark, Eberhard & Studdert, 2005
- Pseudotricula progenitor Ponder, S. A. Clark, Eberhard & Studdert, 2005
