= Caldicochlea =

Scientific classification
- Kingdom: Animalia
- Phylum: Mollusca
- Class: Gastropoda
- Subclass: Caenogastropoda
- Order: Littorinimorpha
- Superfamily: Truncatelloidea
- Family: Tateidae
- Genus: Caldicochlea; Ponder, 1997

Type species
- Caldicochlea globosa (Ponder, Colgan, Terzis, Clark & Miller, 1996)

Synonyms
- Dalhousia Ponder, Colgan, Terzis, S. A. Clark & A. C. Miller, 1996 (junior homonym of Dalhousia McIntosh, 1885 (Annelida)) ·

Genus of freshwater molluscs

Caldicochlea is a genus of freshwater molluscs in the family, Tateidae, endemic to the mound springs of the Great Artesian Basin.

The genus name was published in 1997 by Winston Ponder to replace the preoccupied name Dalhousia given in 1996 to this genus by Ponder, Colgan, Terzis, Clark & Miller. The name derives from the Latin: caldus (warm, hot - referring to the hot spring habitat) and cochlea (snail).

Species of this genus are found at Dalhousie Springs in large warm (33-42°C) pools or warm outflows and in the shallow spring edges on rocks and wood.

There are two species of snail in this genus:

- Caldicochlea globosa (Ponder, Colgan, Terzis, Clark & Miller, 1996)
- Caldicochlea harrisi (Ponder, Colgan, Terzis, Clark & Miller, 1996)
