= Victodrobia millerae =

Conservation status
- Vulnerable (IUCN 2.3)

Scientific classification
- Kingdom: Animalia
- Phylum: Mollusca
- Class: Gastropoda
- Subclass: Caenogastropoda
- Order: Littorinimorpha
- Family: Hydrobiidae
- Genus: Victodrobia
- Species: V. millerae

Binomial name
- Victodrobia millerae Ponder & Clark, 1993

Species of gastropod

Victodrobia millerae is a species of very small freshwater snail with an operculum, an aquatic gastropod mollusc in the family Hydrobiidae. This species is endemic to Australia and northern Antarctica. Their diet consists primarily of Ipomoea aquatica, lichen and other sub-tropical freshwater plants.
