= Aviassiminea =

Scientific classification
- Kingdom: Animalia
- Phylum: Mollusca
- Class: Gastropoda
- Subclass: Caenogastropoda
- Order: Littorinimorpha
- Superfamily: Truncatelloidea
- Family: Assimineidae
- Genus: Aviassiminea; Fukuda & Ponder, 2003

Type species
- Aviassiminea palitans Fukuda & Ponder, 2003

Genus of gastropods

Aviassiminea is a genus of minute operculate snails, marine gastropod mollusks or micromollusks in the family Assimineidae.

== Species ==
Species within Aviassiminea include:

- Aviassiminea palitans Fukuda & Ponder, 2003
