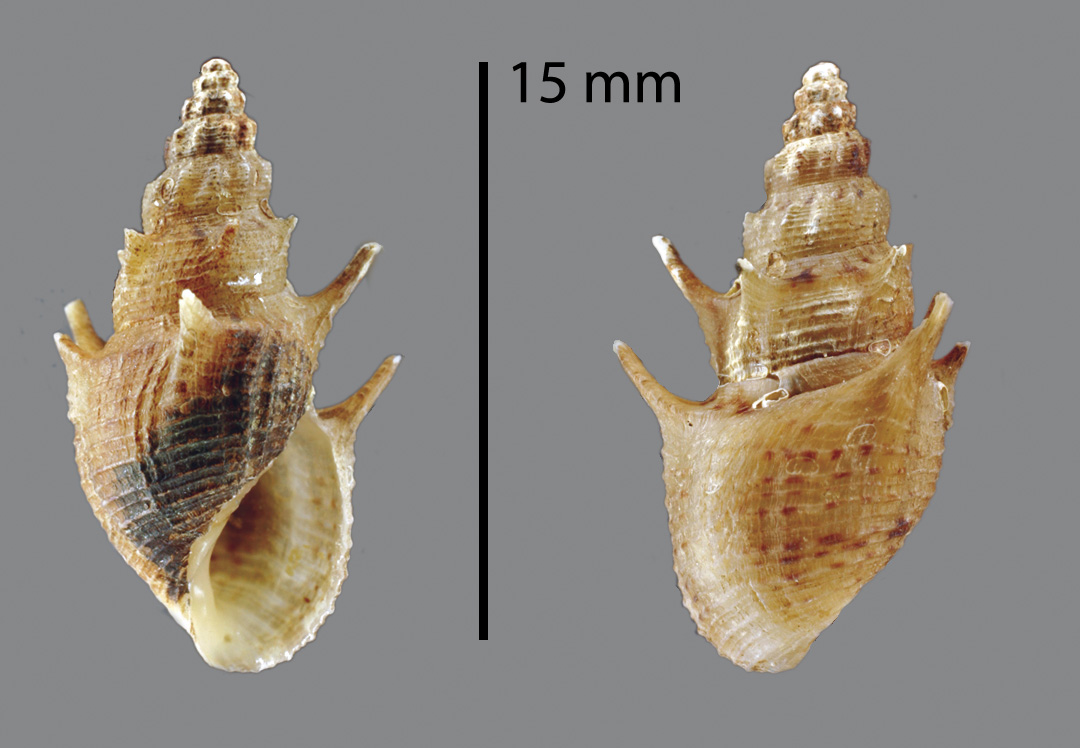
- Shell of Mieniplotia scabra (specimen at MNHN, Paris)

Conservation status
- Least Concern (IUCN 3.1)

Scientific classification
- Kingdom: Animalia
- Phylum: Mollusca
- Class: Gastropoda
- Subclass: Caenogastropoda
- Order: incertae sedis
- Family: Thiaridae
- Genus: Mieniplotia; Low & Tan, 2014
- Species: M. scabra

Binomial name
- Mieniplotia scabra (O. F. Müller, 1774)

Synonyms
- Pseudoplotia Forcart, 1950 – not available: no description Species: Buccinum scabrum O.F. Müller, 1774; Melania granum Branca, 1908; Plotia scabra (Müller, 1774); Thiara scabra (Müller, 1774); Tiara scabra Preston, 1915

= Mieniplotia =

Genus of gastropods

Mieniplotia is a genus of freshwater snails in the family Thiaridae. It is monotypic, the sole species being Mieniplotia scabra.

== Distribution and habitat ==
Mieniplotia scabra is coastal freshwater species that can also occur in brackish water. It occurs from the east coast of Africa to the south Pacific; it is considered invasive in parts of its range.

== Description ==
Mieniplotia scabra has a rather small, somewhat ovoid-conical shell measuring 10–20 mm (0.4–0.8 in).
