= Austropyrgus bunyaensis =

Conservation status
- Data Deficient (IUCN 3.1)

Scientific classification
- Kingdom: Animalia
- Phylum: Mollusca
- Class: Gastropoda
- Subclass: Caenogastropoda
- Order: Littorinimorpha
- Family: Tateidae
- Genus: Austropyrgus
- Species: A. bunyaensis

Binomial name
- Austropyrgus bunyaensis Miller, Ponder & Clark, 1999

Species of gastropod

Austropyrgus bunyaensis is a species of small freshwater snail with an operculum, an aquatic gastropod mollusc or micromollusc in the family Tateidae. This species is endemic to southeastern Queensland, Australia. It is only known from small streams near the top of Mount Mowbullan, Bunya Mountains.
