= Setobaudinia umbadayi =

Scientific classification
- Kingdom: Animalia
- Phylum: Mollusca
- Class: Gastropoda
- Order: Stylommatophora
- Family: Camaenidae
- Genus: Setobaudinia
- Species: S. umbadayi

Binomial name
- Setobaudinia umbadayi Koehler, 2017

Species of gastropod

Setobaudinia umbadayi is a species of air-breathing land snail, a terrestrial pulmonate gastropod mollusc in the family Camaenidae. The species was found during an expedition led by Frank Koehler on the islands off the Kimberely Coast in 2017. It was amongst other species that were previously unknown to scientists found on the islands.
