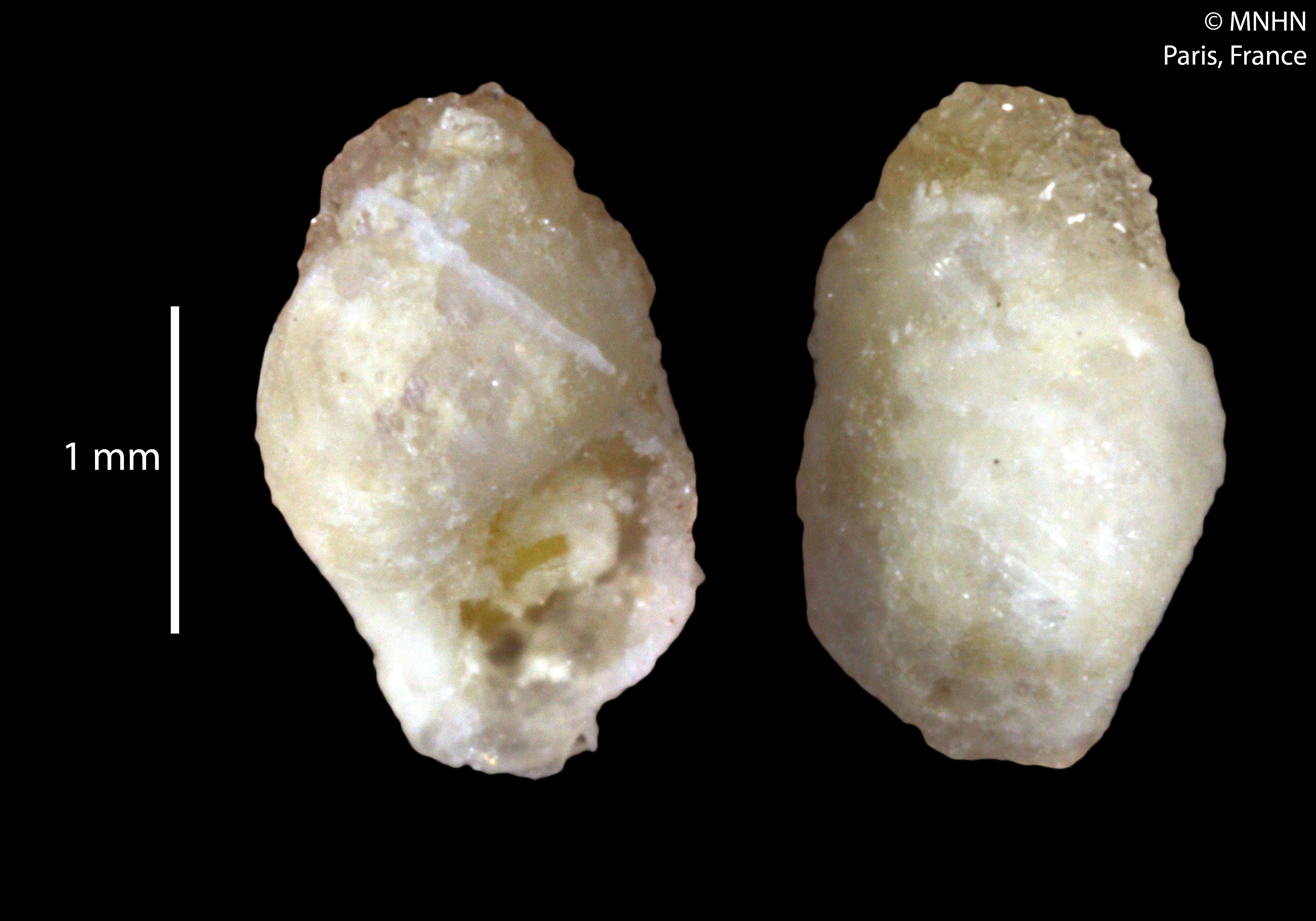
- Shell of Pseudotricula eberhardi (paratype at MNHN, Paris)

Scientific classification
- Kingdom: Animalia
- Phylum: Mollusca
- Class: Gastropoda
- Subclass: Caenogastropoda
- Order: Littorinimorpha
- Family: Tateidae
- Genus: Pseudotricula
- Species: P. eberhardi

Binomial name
- Pseudotricula eberhardi Ponder, 1992

= Pseudotricula eberhardi =

Species of gastropods

Pseudotricula eberhardi is a species of small freshwater snail with an operculum, aquatic gastropod molluscs or micromolluscs in the family Tateidae. and was first described in 1992 by Winston Ponder. The species epithet honours Stefan Eberhard who collected the type specimens.

Paratype site: Black Curtain Streamway, Cueva Blanca, Precipitous Bluff, TAS

This species is an aquatic, cave-dwelling snail found only in Tasmania.
