= Carnarvoncochlea =

Scientific classification
- Kingdom: Animalia
- Phylum: Mollusca
- Class: Gastropoda
- Subclass: Caenogastropoda
- Order: Littorinimorpha
- Superfamily: Truncatelloidea
- Family: Tateidae
- Genus: Carnarvoncochlea; Ponder, W.-H. Zhang, Hallan & Shea, 2019

Type species
- Jardinella carnarvonensis Ponder & G. A. Clark, 1990

Genus of gastropods

Carnarvoncochlea is a genus of small freshwater snails, aquatic gastropod mollusks in the family Tateidae.

== Species ==
- Carnarvoncochlea carnarvonensis (Ponder & Clark, 1990)
- Carnarvoncochlea exigua (Ponder & Clark, 1990)
