= Victodrobia =

Scientific classification
- Kingdom: Animalia
- Phylum: Mollusca
- Class: Gastropoda
- Subclass: Caenogastropoda
- Order: Littorinimorpha
- Family: Hydrobiidae
- Genus: Victodrobia; Ponder & Clark in Pond Cla, Mill & Toluzzi 1993

Genus of freshwater snails

Victodrobia is a genus of very small freshwater snails with an operculum, aquatic gastropod mollusks in the family Hydrobiidae.

== Species ==
Species within the genus Victodrobia include:

- Victodrobia burni
- Victodrobia elongata
- Victodrobia millerae
- Victodrobia victoriensis
