= Trochidrobia minuta =

Conservation status
- Vulnerable (IUCN 2.3)

Scientific classification
- Kingdom: Animalia
- Phylum: Mollusca
- Class: Gastropoda
- Subclass: Caenogastropoda
- Order: Littorinimorpha
- Family: Tateidae
- Genus: Trochidrobia
- Species: T. minuta

Binomial name
- Trochidrobia minuta Ponder, Hershler & Jenkins, 1989

Species of gastropod

Trochidrobia minuta is a species of very small freshwater snail, an aquatic gastropod mollusk in the family Tateidae. This species is endemic to Australia.
