= Victodrobia burni =

Conservation status
- Least Concern (IUCN 3.1)

Scientific classification
- Kingdom: Animalia
- Phylum: Mollusca
- Class: Gastropoda
- Subclass: Caenogastropoda
- Order: Littorinimorpha
- Family: Hydrobiidae
- Genus: Victodrobia
- Species: V. burni

Binomial name
- Victodrobia burni Ponder & Clark, 1993

Species of gastropod

Victodrobia burni is a species of very small freshwater snail with an operculum, an aquatic gastropod mollusc in the family Hydrobiidae. This species is endemic to Australia.
