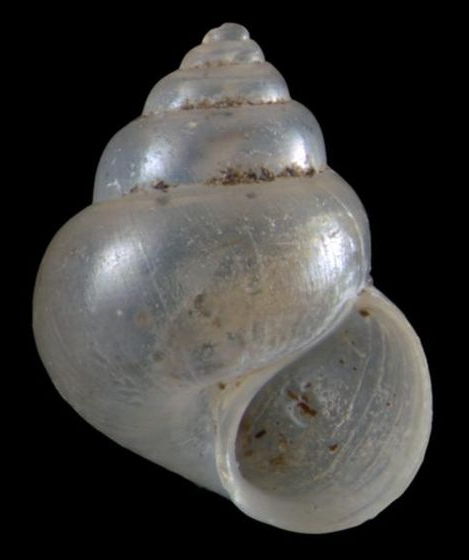
- Shell of Aviassiminea palitans (specimen in the Australian Museum)

Scientific classification
- Kingdom: Animalia
- Phylum: Mollusca
- Class: Gastropoda
- Subclass: Caenogastropoda
- Order: Littorinimorpha
- Family: Assimineidae
- Genus: Aviassiminea
- Species: A. palitans

Binomial name
- Aviassiminea palitans Fukuda & Ponder, 2003

= Aviassiminea palitans =

Species of gastropod

Aviassiminea palitans is a species of small operculate snail, a marine gastropod mollusk or micromollusk in the family Assimineidae.

== Distribution ==
This species is endemic to Australia and occurs in fresh waters and springs in the Northern Territory and Western Australia.
