= Rhagada harti =

Conservation status
- Vulnerable (IUCN 2.3)

Scientific classification
- Kingdom: Animalia
- Phylum: Mollusca
- Class: Gastropoda
- Order: Stylommatophora
- Family: Camaenidae
- Genus: Rhagada
- Species: R. harti

Binomial name
- Rhagada harti Solem, 1985

Species of land snail

Rhagada harti is a species of air-breathing land snail, a terrestrial pulmonate gastropod mollusc in the family Camaenidae. This species is endemic to Australia.
