= Carnarvoncochlea carnarvonensis =

Conservation status
- Least Concern (IUCN 3.1)

Scientific classification
- Kingdom: Animalia
- Phylum: Mollusca
- Class: Gastropoda
- Subclass: Caenogastropoda
- Order: Littorinimorpha
- Family: Tateidae
- Genus: Carnarvoncochlea
- Species: C. carnarvonensis

Binomial name
- Carnarvoncochlea carnarvonensis (Ponder & Clark, 1990)

Synonyms
- Jardinella carnarvonensis Ponder & G. A. Clark, 1990 (basionym)

Species of gastropods

Carnarvoncochlea carnarvonensis is a species of small freshwater snails, aquatic gastropod mollusks in the family Tateidae.

This species is endemic to Australia.

== See also ==
- List of non-marine molluscs of Australia
