= Austropyrgus centralia =

Conservation status
- Least Concern (IUCN 3.1)

Scientific classification
- Kingdom: Animalia
- Phylum: Mollusca
- Class: Gastropoda
- Subclass: Caenogastropoda
- Order: Littorinimorpha
- Family: Tateidae
- Genus: Austropyrgus
- Species: A. centralia

Binomial name
- Austropyrgus centralia (Ponder, Colgan, Terzis, Clark & Miller, 1996)

Species of gastropod

Austropyrgus centralia is a species of small freshwater snail with an operculum, an aquatic gastropod mollusc or micromollusc in the family Tateidae. This species is endemic to northern South Australia. It is only known from a few small seeps and the shallow lower outflow of one larger spring in Dalhousie Springs, Lake Eyre basin.
