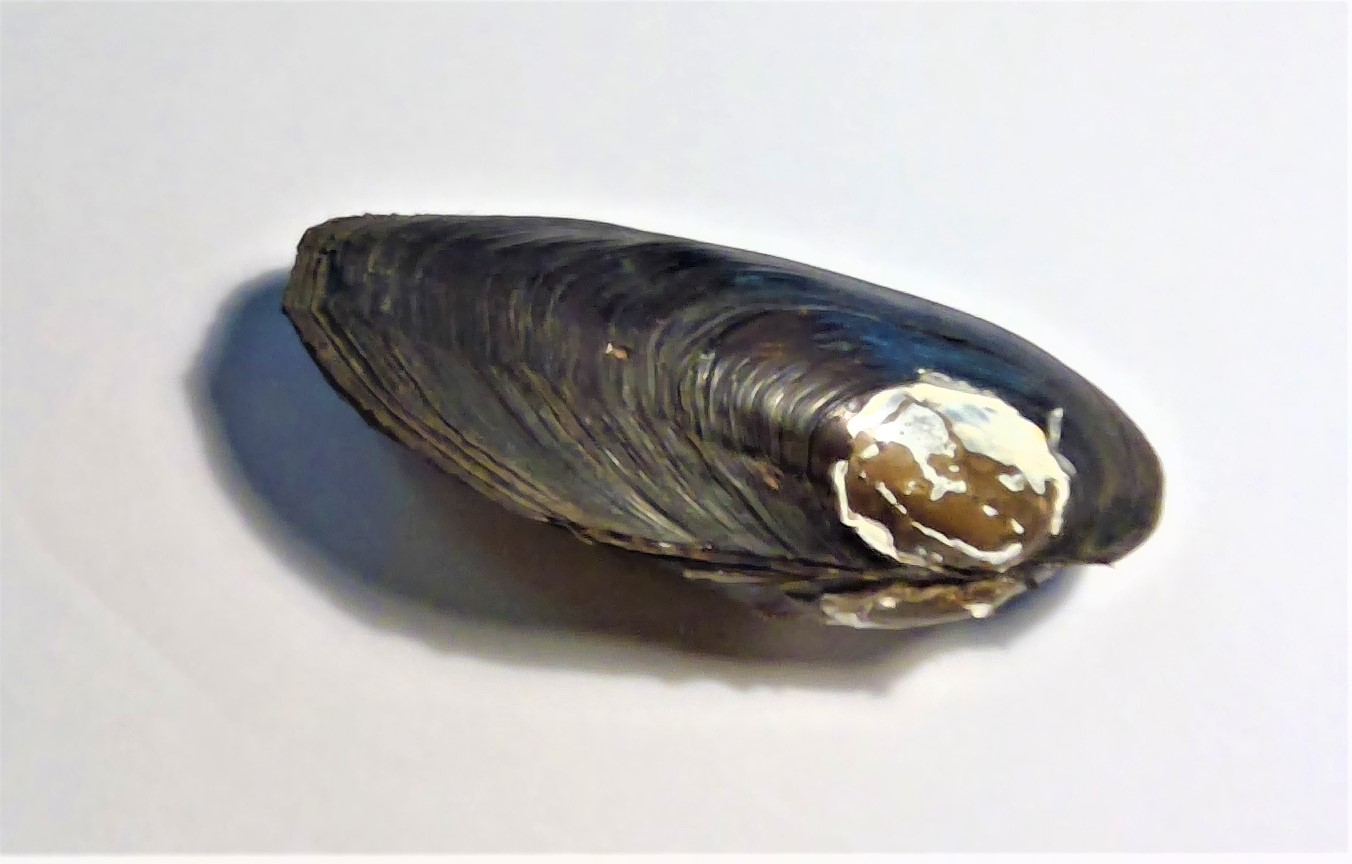
- Velesunio wilsonii from the Ross River, Townsville, Queensland, Australia

Scientific classification
- Kingdom: Animalia
- Phylum: Mollusca
- Class: Bivalvia
- Order: Unionida
- Family: Hyriidae
- Genus: Velesunio
- Species: V. wilsonii

Binomial name
- Velesunio wilsonii (Lea, 1859)

Synonyms
- Unio (Alasmodon) stuarti Adams & Angas, 1864; Centralhyria wilsonii caurina Iredale, 1934.

= Velesunio wilsonii =

Species of bivalve

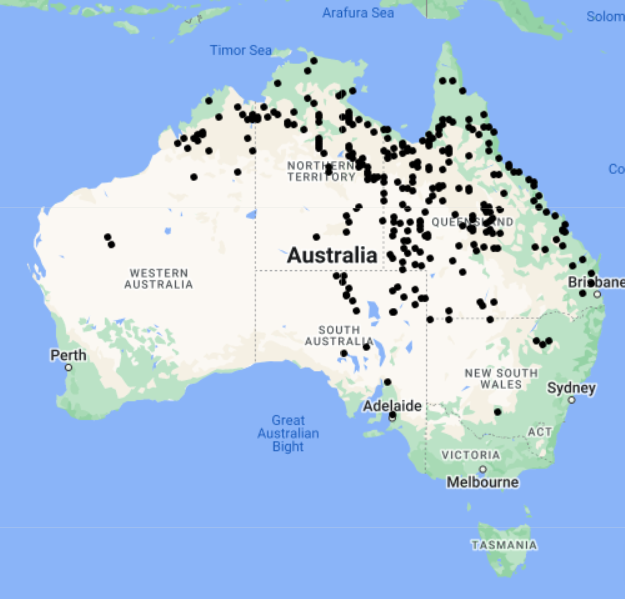
Distribution map of Velesunio wilsonii in Australia.

Velesunio wilsonii is a species of freshwater mussel endemic to Australia and comes from the Hyriidae family (phylum: Mollusca). Velesunio wilsonii mussels have a thick, dark shell that are sometimes flaky and mostly closed. Velesunio wilsonii have a fleshy foot that sometimes extends outside of the valves. The shell of the Velesunio wilsonii varies from oblong to a symmetrical circle. Velesunio wilsonii size ranges from 40 mm to 120 mm.

== Biology and ecology ==
Reproduction in Velesunio wilsonii generally involves the male mussels releasing sperm that females take up to fertilize their eggs. Once fertilized, the embryos develop within the females’ gills. These develop into larvae (glochidia), which then attach to the gills or fins of native fish, acting parasitic. They remain attached to the fish by hooks until they have metamorphosed into juvenile mussels with siphon structures that allow them to feed. Velesunio wilsonii siphon water into these structures and filter-feed, filtering out algae and nutrients. Once fully developed, Velesunio wilsonii live in the sediment of rivers and floodplains and remain relatively sedentary throughout their life. Due to their ability to tolerate changing environmental conditions, Velesunio wilsonii can live for a long period of time.

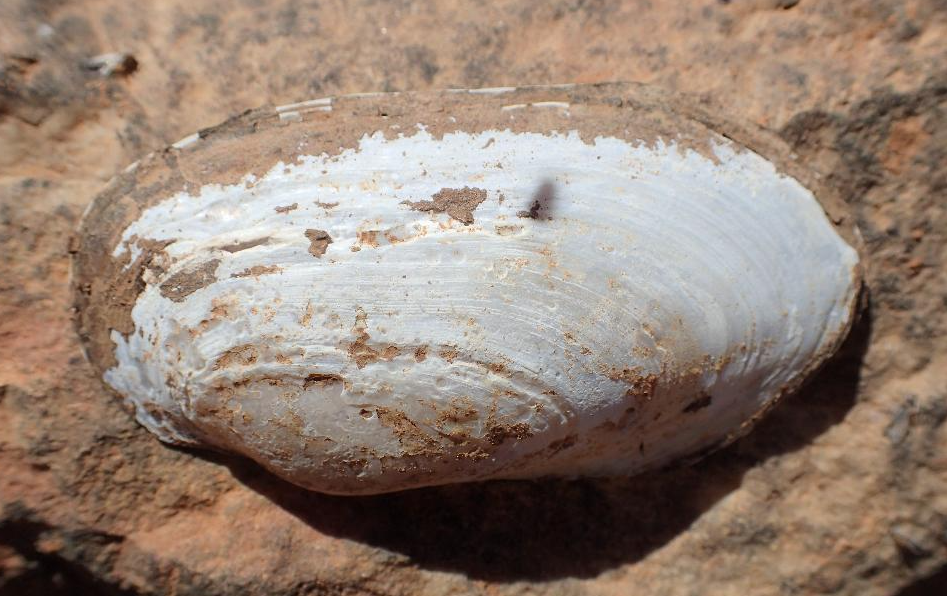
Velesunio wilsonii shell

Dispersal of Velesunio wilsonii mussels in adult stages is limited and they remain mostly sedentary. However, it has been suggested that mussels from the Velesunio genus are dispersed when attached to the fish in their larvae stage. This may explain the large range of Velesunio wilsonii within Australia.

== Distribution ==
Velesunio wilsonii mussels are distributed throughout several areas of Australia. Velesunio wilsonii can be found in the Northern Territory, Western Australia, Queensland, northeast of South Australia and northern New South Wales. There are no records of Velesunio wilsonii in Victoria or Tasmania.

== Habitat ==
Velesunio wilsonii occurs in lowland floodplain ecosystems, including billabongs, temporary and episodic streams, irrigation canals and farm dams. Velesunio wilsonii live partially buried in fine sediments such as sand and mud. When buried and their shell is closed, Velesunio wilsonii can survive in drought conditions, high temperatures and low levels of oxygen, allowing them to inhabit a wide range of ecosystem types.

== Evolution ==
Velesunio wilsonii come from one of two classes of molluscs that have successfully inhabited freshwater ecosystems. All other mollusc classes remain in marine ecosystems. Bivalve molluscs evolved in marine ecosystems before slowly moving into estuaries and inhabiting upstream freshwater habitats, evolving to tolerate lower salinity levels. Velesunio wilsonii is an example of this evolution.

== Threats ==
Velesunio wilsonii mussels are threatened with changes to biotic and abiotic conditions of lowland river ecosystems. Changes to flow regimes through dam and weir construction may limit the ability of host fish to disperse, limiting the dispersal of Velesunio wilsonii larvae. Changes to flow regime may also affect the ecology of the host fish, causing host fish populations to decline. Increased erosion, sedimentation and pollutant runoff may also affect the survival of Velesunio wilsonii, affecting the water quality of floodplains.
