= Caldicochlea globosa =

Conservation status
- Least Concern (IUCN 3.1)

Scientific classification
- Kingdom: Animalia
- Phylum: Mollusca
- Class: Gastropoda
- Subclass: Caenogastropoda
- Order: Littorinimorpha
- Superfamily: Truncatelloidea
- Family: Tateidae
- Genus: Caldicochlea
- Species: C. globosa

Binomial name
- Caldicochlea globosa (Ponder, Colgan, Terzis, Clark & Miller, 1996)

Species of freshwater mollusc

Caldicochlea globosa is a species of freshwater mollusc in the family, Tateidae, endemic to the Dalhousie Springs of the Great Artesian Basin. The species was first described in 1996 as Dalhousia globosa by Winston Ponder, Donald Colgan, T. Terzis, Stephanie Clark and Alison Miller. However, the genus name of Dalhousia had already been used, and thus in 1997, Ponder published the replacement genus name of Caldicochlea.

The snails are tiny (adults from 3–4.6mm) and vary highly in shell shape, making them hard to distinguish on shell morphology from C. harrisi, but C. globosa is usually bigger and more globe shaped.

These snails are found in large warm pools or warm outflows at temperatures from 33 to 42 °C.
