= Austropyrgus =

Scientific classification
- Kingdom: Animalia
- Phylum: Mollusca
- Class: Gastropoda
- Subclass: Caenogastropoda
- Order: Littorinimorpha
- Family: Tateidae
- Genus: Austropyrgus; Cotton, 1942

Type species
- Paludina nigra Quoy & Gaimard, 1834

Genus of gastropods

Austropyrgus is a genus of minute freshwater snails with an operculum, aquatic gastropod molluscs or micromolluscs in the family Tateidae. Austropyrgus species are endemic to Australia, where they are found in virtually all freshwater habitats, from high mountain streams to isolated springs in the arid zone.

== Species ==
With 76 recognized species, Austropyrgus is the largest genus of Australian freshwater molluscs and is the most widespread of the Australian freshwater Hydrobiidae genera. Austropyrgus species include:

- Austropyrgus abercrombiensis S. A. Clark, A. C. Miller & Ponder, 2003
- Austropyrgus angasi (E. A. Smith, 1882)
- Austropyrgus aslini S. A. Clark, A. C. Miller & Ponder, 2003
- Austropyrgus avius S. A. Clark, A. C. Miller & Ponder, 2003
- Austropyrgus buchanensis S. A. Clark, A. C. Miller & Ponder, 2003
- Austropyrgus bullerensis S. A. Clark, A. C. Miller & Ponder, 2003
- Austropyrgus bungoniensis S. A. Clark, A. C. Miller & Ponder, 2003
- Austropyrgus bunyaensis A. C. Miller, Ponder & S. A. Clark, 1999
- Austropyrgus centralia (Ponder, Colgan, Terzis, S. A. Clark & A. C. Miller, 1996)
- Austropyrgus colensis S. A. Clark, A. C. Miller & Ponder, 2003
- Austropyrgus colludens S. A. Clark, A. C. Miller & Ponder, 2003
- Austropyrgus conicus S. A. Clark, A. C. Miller & Ponder, 2003
- Austropyrgus coolingi Ponder, Nimbs & Shea, 2023
- Austropyrgus cooma (Iredale, 1943)
- Austropyrgus daylesfordensis S. A. Clark, A. C. Miller & Ponder, 2003
- Austropyrgus dekeyzeri S. A. Clark, A. C. Miller & Ponder, 2003
- Austropyrgus diemensis (Frauenfeld, 1863)
- Austropyrgus dyerianus (Petterd, 1879)
- Austropyrgus elongatus (May, 1921)
- Austropyrgus eumekes S. A. Clark, A. C. Miller & Ponder, 2003
- Austropyrgus exiguus S. A. Clark, A. C. Miller & Ponder, 2003
- Austropyrgus flindersensis S. A. Clark, A. C. Miller & Ponder, 2003
- Austropyrgus fonscultus S. A. Clark, A. C. Miller & Ponder, 2003
- Austropyrgus foris (Ponder, Colgan, S. A. Clark, A. C. Miller & Terzis, 1994)
- Austropyrgus gippslandicus (Ponder, Colgan, S. A. Clark, A. C. Miller & Terzis, 1994)
- Austropyrgus glenelgensis S. A. Clark, A. C. Miller & Ponder, 2003
- Austropyrgus goliathus S. A. Clark, A. C. Miller & Ponder, 2003
- Austropyrgus gordonensis S. A. Clark, A. C. Miller & Ponder, 2003
- Austropyrgus grampianensis (Gabriel, 1939)
- Austropyrgus gunnii (Frauenfeld, 1863)
- Austropyrgus halletensis S. A. Clark, A. C. Miller & Ponder, 2003
- Austropyrgus juliae S. A. Clark, A. C. Miller & Ponder, 2003
- Austropyrgus latus S. A. Clark, A. C. Miller & Ponder, 2003
- Austropyrgus lippus S. A. Clark, A. C. Miller & Ponder, 2003
- Austropyrgus lochi S. A. Clark, A. C. Miller & Ponder, 2003
- Austropyrgus macaulayi S. A. Clark, A. C. Miller & Ponder, 2003
- Austropyrgus macedonensis S. A. Clark, A. C. Miller & Ponder, 2003
- Austropyrgus macropus S. A. Clark, A. C. Miller & Ponder, 2003
- Austropyrgus mersus S. A. Clark, A. C. Miller & Ponder, 2003
- Austropyrgus monaroensis S. A. Clark, A. C. Miller & Ponder, 2003
- Austropyrgus nanoacuminatus S. A. Clark, A. C. Miller & Ponder, 2003
- Austropyrgus nanus S. A. Clark, A. C. Miller & Ponder, 2003
- Austropyrgus nepeanensis S. A. Clark, A. C. Miller & Ponder, 2003
- Austropyrgus niger (Quoy & Gaimard, 1834)
- Austropyrgus nitidus (R. M. Johnston, 1879)
- Austropyrgus ora S. A. Clark, A. C. Miller & Ponder, 2003
- Austropyrgus otwayensis S. A. Clark, A. C. Miller & Ponder, 2003
- Austropyrgus pagodoides S. A. Clark, A. C. Miller & Ponder, 2003
- Austropyrgus parvus S. A. Clark, A. C. Miller & Ponder, 2003
- Austropyrgus petterdianus (Brazier, 1875)
- Austropyrgus pisinnus S. A. Clark, A. C. Miller & Ponder, 2003
- Austropyrgus praecipitis S. A. Clark, A. C. Miller & Ponder, 2003
- Austropyrgus privus S. A. Clark, A. C. Miller & Ponder, 2003
- Austropyrgus procerus S. A. Clark, A. C. Miller & Ponder, 2003
- Austropyrgus pusillus S. A. Clark, A. C. Miller & Ponder, 2003
- Austropyrgus rectoides S. A. Clark, A. C. Miller & Ponder, 2003
- Austropyrgus rectus (Ponder, Colgan, S. A. Clark, A. C. Miller & Terzis, 1994)
- Austropyrgus ronkershawi S. A. Clark, A. C. Miller & Ponder, 2003
- Austropyrgus salvus S. A. Clark, A. C. Miller & Ponder, 2003
- Austropyrgus simsonianus (Brazier, 1875)
- Austropyrgus sinuatus S. A. Clark, A. C. Miller & Ponder, 2003
- Austropyrgus smithii (Petterd, 1889)
- Austropyrgus solitarius S. A. Clark, A. C. Miller & Ponder, 2003
- Austropyrgus sparsus (Iredale, 1944)
- Austropyrgus spectus S. A. Clark, A. C. Miller & Ponder, 2003
- Austropyrgus stevensmithi S. A. Clark, A. C. Miller & Ponder, 2003
- Austropyrgus synoria S. A. Clark, A. C. Miller & Ponder, 2003
- Austropyrgus tateiformis S. A. Clark, A. C. Miller & Ponder, 2003
- Austropyrgus tathraensis S. A. Clark, A. C. Miller & Ponder, 2003
- Austropyrgus tebus S. A. Clark, A. C. Miller & Ponder, 2003
- Austropyrgus tumidus S. A. Clark, A. C. Miller & Ponder, 2003
- Austropyrgus turbatus (Ponder, Colgan, S. A. Clark, A. C. Miller & Terzis, 1994)
- Austropyrgus vastus S. A. Clark, A. C. Miller & Ponder, 2003
- Austropyrgus viridarium S. A. Clark, A. C. Miller & Ponder, 2003
- Austropyrgus vulgaris S. A. Clark, A. C. Miller & Ponder, 2003
- Austropyrgus wombeyanensis S. A. Clark, A. C. Miller & Ponder, 2003
- Austropyrgus zeidleri S. A. Clark, A. C. Miller & Ponder, 2003
