= Trochidrobia =

Scientific classification
- Kingdom: Animalia
- Phylum: Mollusca
- Class: Gastropoda
- Subclass: Caenogastropoda
- Order: Littorinimorpha
- Family: Tateidae
- Genus: Trochidrobia; Ponder, Hershler & Jenkins, 1989

Type species
- Trochidrobia punicea Ponder, Hershler & Jenkins, 1989

Species
- See text

Genus of gastropods

Trochidrobia is a genus of freshwater snails endemic to the Lake Eyre artesian springs in the Great Artesian Basin in South Australia. The genus currently houses four species: T. inflata, minuta, punicea, and smithi.

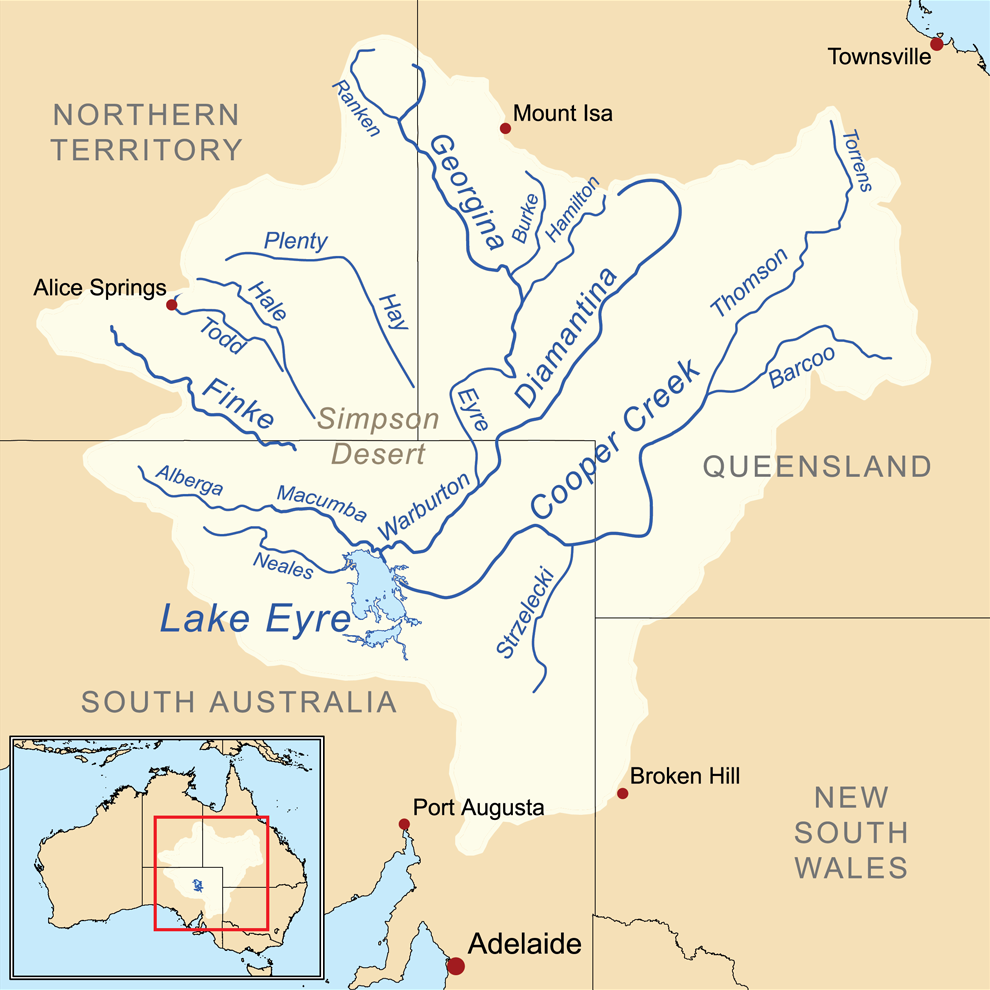
Lake Eyre in South Australia

== Species ==
=== Trochidrobia inflata ===
T. inflata is found in the same geographical locations as T. minuta, in shallow waters of the lower part of the mound springs outflow. The name inflata was derived from the characteristic of the species' inflated shell. This species is found in the Freeling Springs complex in the northern part of Lake Eyre supergroup. T. inflata has a small but wide umbilicus and a relatively larger spire as compared to other species. The average adult size can reach ~1.5 – 1.7mm in diameter.

=== Trochidrobia minuta ===
T. minuta is the smallest species of Trochidrobia, hence its species name. This species is found alongside T. inflata in Freeling Springs and has a wide hole at the centre of the shell and a shorter and flatter spire. The average diameter of adults for this species is about 1.2mm and individuals are yellowish white to a pale brown. The head and foot are pigmented heavily.

=== Trochidrobia punicea ===
T. punicea is found in the southern and middle part of the Artesian springs system. The species is usually found completely exposed above the water's surface. T. punicea has a short spire and an open centre of the shell. The name punicea is derived from purple-red in Latin, which is a reference to the shell of this species. Its diameter reaches a maximum of 2.2mm and the operculum is oval-shaped. The head and foot of this genus usually has dark pigmentation. This is the only species of Trochidrobia appears to be attracted to light.

=== Trochidrobia smithi ===
T. smithi is found in the Middle Springs, Southern-Western Springs and the Northern Springs in the Artesian Springs system. The species has a shell with a short spire and an open umbilicus that reaches a maximum diameter of 2.1mm. The average adult size for this genus species is between 1.7mm to 2.1mm. The head and foot are similar to T. punicea as the species has uniform dark pigmentation.
