= Edgbastonia coreena =

Conservation status
- Vulnerable (IUCN 2.3)

Scientific classification
- Kingdom: Animalia
- Phylum: Mollusca
- Class: Gastropoda
- Subclass: Caenogastropoda
- Order: Littorinimorpha
- Family: Tateidae
- Genus: Edgbastonia
- Species: E. coreena

Binomial name
- Edgbastonia coreena (Ponder & Clark, 1990)

Synonyms
- Edgbastonia (Barcaldinia) coreena (Ponder & G. A. Clark, 1990)· accepted, alternate representation; Jardinella coreena Ponder & G. A. Clark, 1990 (basionym)

Species of gastropod

Edgbastonia coreena is a species of small freshwater snail which have an operculum, aquatic gastropod mollusc in the family Tateidae.

This species is endemic to Australia and found in Queensland.

== Description ==
=== Shell ===
The shell length is considered medium size of 2.61 to 3.09mm length (averaging 2.72mm in Males and 2.84mm in females). Their width ranges from 2.17 to 2.55mm (with males extending means of 2.72mm and females with 2.84mm). This is a significant reduction in size compared to Edgbastonia Corrugata's (or Jardinella Corrugata's) shell length of 3.46 to 4.06mm. As well as a significant size difference to the smaller, related species, Edgbastonia Allanwillsi which has a length of 2.0 to 2.4mm and a width of 1.5 to 2.0mm. A similar species, the Edgbastonia edgbastonesis aligns more closely with Coreena, measuring of 2.74 to 3.22mm (which averages 2.8 for males and 2.98 for females), as well as width ranges of 2.36 to 2.86mm (average of 2.43mm for males and 2.58 for females).

The general size is relatively middle with medium thickness and appear translucent and pale white. The shell structure adopts a conventional trochiform shape, including a conical spiral with a flat base. This spiral angle of the shell formation can be measured to range 76.58° to 89.9° with males averaging 79.07°, a 10° difference to their female counterpart (80.86°). In comparison with the closely related species, Edgbastonia Corrugata, their shell is much larger with the similar trochiform structure. Both genders exhibit similar medium thickness and appear white, almost translucent. Their spiral angles vary from 85.96°-102.39°, where the mean average between male and female are 91.05° and 93.81°, respectively. Other species such as the edgbastonensis, also adopt the trochiform shape and shell pigmentation of white, almost translucent appearance. Their spiral angles closely align and are comparatively consistent with 75.49° to 92.92° ranges (of which a mean of 83.17° for males and 84.47° for females).

Edgbastonia Coreena's teleoconch has a mean of 2.85 convex whorls. Compared to other species such as the Edgbastonia Allanwillsi which has an average of four whorls, through which the teleoconch (larval shell) adopts a more of a convex whorl and the upper shell ridges are stripped with visible growth line patterns. Edgbastonia Corrugata conversely, has a teleoconch of 2.7 to 2.9, roughly 3 whorls as well as a convexity ratio of 0.28 to 0.38. The teleoconch is structured, exhibiting distinct axial and rigid growth lines. This is consistent with edgbastonensis that measures a teleoconch of 2.75 to 3.2 whorl convexity. The opening aperture of the Edgbastonia Corrugata has a length to shell ratio of 0.52 to 0.66 (of which 0.63 for males, and 0.6 for females). The hollow aperture length stretches to 2.33mm and has 2.7, roughly 3 teleoconch whorls on it. Whereas aperture opening of the Edgbastonia Coreena's shell has a length of 0.52 to 0.56mm (almost identical between genders). Which is concurrent with the aperture length of species like edgbastonensis that measures up to 0.51 to 0.6mm.

The lip thickness of the Coreena is also of medium thickness and width, contrasting in smoothness to its outer rim which have 15.97° to 28.24° angular spirals of varying rigidity. Whereas Corrugata's inner lip thickness is narrower and spirals at an angle of 19.29° to 31.88°. However, smaller species such as the edgbastonensis measures a minimal lip thickness of angular range, 14.31° to 27.37°.

The umbilicus, consistent with Coreena's general shell structure is also of medium width (relative to other Jardinella and Edgbastonia species) with width ranging from 0.22 to 0.4mm. Edgbastonensis also maintain an umbilicus of medium width of 0.27 to 0.47mm. Conversely, Corrugata would have its umbilicus at width of 1.2mm.

A Coreena's operculum is pigmented yellow and has a length of 1.22 to 1.4mm which is distanced roughly 3.41mm to the nucleus. This is similar to other species such as with Edgbastonia Corrugata where their operculum is visibly yellowish and pale, with a length of 1.77 to 2.11. Other species like edgbastonia edgbastonensis where its operculum is also thin, pale and yellow and has an average length of 1.21 to 1.61mm.

=== Body ===
The radula of the Coreena contains central tooth's that consists of averaging 3 to 4 lateral cusp protrusions that are each of ratio length 1.6 to 1.7. A characteristic, mimicked with its neighboring species of Edgbastonia corrugate where its radula has central teeth with 4 lateral cusps 2 pairs of sharp, edged tooth's at the upper edge of the inverted U-shaped concavity. There are 2 pairs of denticles in a Coreena, located at the upper dorsal edge of the U-shaped radula concavity. Cephalic tentacles are triangular in structure and are either unpigmented or blackish grey, generally located on head which are themselves pigmented darkish grey. Conversely, other species such as the Edgbastonia Corrugata has cephalic tentacles located protruding out of the upper dorsal area of the body surface. Their head and foot are both black and darkish grey of colour and the middle-upper area is unpigmented and conversely, filled with cephalic tentacles. However, the coil is pigmented although mostly darkish grey.

The mantle cavity of a Coreena are composed of 25 to 28 filaments, shifted towards the right of apex. It also has an osphradium located near the middle of the gills and respiratory organs. Its rectum does not arch and is positioned near the edge of body, beside the kidney. Those characteristics are shared with various Edgbastonia species, namely the corrugate with its mantle cavity which also covers the central body and has 26-28 filaments, apexed at the right and towards the centre of the body. The hypobranchial gland that is below the gills are reduced or absent altogether. The rectum is slightly arched and is near the mantle edge. The kidney does not extend forward into the central brain (pallial) roof and positioned near rectum, similar to the Coreena. Other species such as the Edgbastonia Allanwillsi, has a body structure that contains a short double-lobed snout with moderately sized cephalic tentacles protruding its head. The upper dorsal foot consists of black, cephalic tentacles and a dark greyish neck. The mantle cavity which consists of the gills, taste buds and excretory/reproductive organs contain 23 to 35 triangular filaments that apexes more closely to the right, a larger range of filaments compared to Coreena and other Edgbastonia species.

=== Reproductive system ===
==== Male ====
Coreena males have a penial lobe that connects to the penis situated towards the distal part of body. The penial organ is unpigmented and the duct or vas deferens, coils once around the prostate gland. Common trait shared with the Corrugata where its penial lobe is situated away from the centre of the body and is structured bluntly with a “black zone” appearance at the terminal end of the base that is partially black itself. The vas deferens or sperm transportation ducts coils a few loops across the prostate gland. Conversely, Edgbastonia Allanwillsi contain testis composed of several simple lobes that joins the sperm transportation ducts (vas deferens), forming a long, coiled and narrow seminal vesicle. The prostate gland is pear shaped and distinctly narrow. The vas deferens coils the prostate gland and then connecting to the penial structure. Through which the penis is located near the central part of head and is unpigmented.

==== Female ====
Coreena females have an oviduct located near the pallial, area of the brain and this is connected through a muscular vestibule tubule that further joins into the anterior of the capsule gland. Bursal duct is located towards the middle of the anterior of the ovoid copulatrix, that respectively lies near the albumen gland. The oviduct and bursal duct coils separate to the pallial wall. They are coiled in the shape of a U, except slightly more rigid and more bends. This is concurrent with other species such as the Edgbastonia corrugate where its oviduct is located near the pallial and has a ventral channel near the vestibule tube. The tube is extended through a protruding anterior edge of the capsule gland. There are tissue folds that run down the oviduct opening towards the duct and the bursal duct appear from the middle anterior side of the duct which is posterior to the albumen gland. The oviduct is coiled in a plain U shape. However, species like the Edgbastonia Allanwillsi has its ovary constructed of few but large lobes and contains large eggs. It is located in the inverted U-shaped renal oviduct that is connected via the upper muscular oviduct. The albumen gland is U-shaped and bends towards the anterior half. The common duct that serves as the junction of the oviduct opens to the capsule gland and continues through left ventral wall.

== Distribution ==
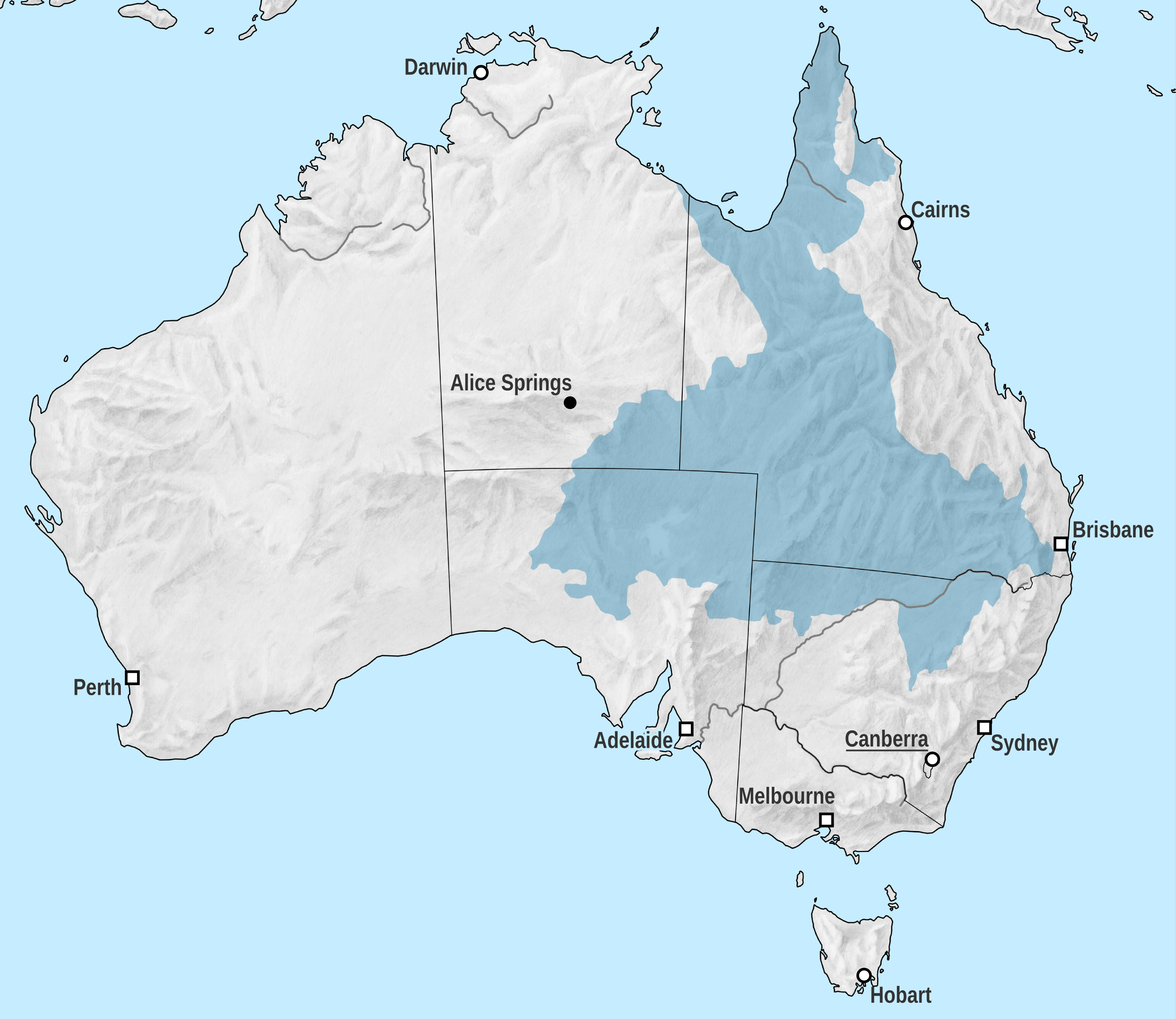
Map of the Great Artesian Basin

Edgbastonia Coreena are an endemic freshwater gastropod species prevalent across the Great Artesian Basin (GAB). Australia's GAB is considered the largest artesian basin system in the world. It surround 1.7million square kilometres of land, covering parts of Queensland, New South Wales, South Australia and Northern Territory.

Jardinella species have been found in both the eastern and western side of the Great Dividing Range, with at least 12 species located on the western side of the Great Dividing Range, covering coast of north-east of Queensland.

Jardinella and Edgbastonia species are concentrated in the north and east of Australia, whereas Fonschoclea and Trochidrobia in Southern Australia. Edgbastonia Coreena, among 11 other Jardinella species has been found in at least four SG springs of Lake Eyre SG of South Australia, and various abundant springs in Queensland, namely Edgbaston Reserve.

Edgbastonia Coreena are also distinctly found in a large unnamed spring, south of the homestead “Coreena” (of related name), roughly 32 km north-east of the outback region of Barcaldine of Queensland.

== Taxonomy ==
The species accepted name is Edgbastonia Coreena and was formerly termed “Jardinella Coreena”.

It is of the genus (and subgenus) Edgbastonia(Barcaldinia) and part of the Tateidae family.

The Tateidae family is a new family of freshwater snail species that was branched from the previously larger variant of Hydrobiidae.

Its superfamily is that of truncatelloidea which is branched from the suborder Rissoidina, of the order Littorinimorpha. It is part of the subclass (or infraclass) of Caenogastropoda.

== Ecology ==
=== Habitat ===
The GAB covers four of Australia's states, notably Queensland and South Australia with an abundance of “oasis like” spring environments . Freshwater springs located within the dry parts of Queensland and South Australia, rely on the GAB system to supply a constant source of water. Thus, inducing a spring environment sustainable for endemic fauna and flora including freshwater gastropod species of the Jardinella and Edgbastonia genera, such as the Edgbastonia Coreena.

Level of diversity varies between spring regions across Queensland as springs surrounding Lake Eyre (or Kati Thanda) have species predominantly of the Tateidae family including Edgbastonia Coreena whereas other regions such as the Pelican Creek complex, have a more balanced species distribution between Tateidae, Bithyniidae and Planorbidae. Most gastropod species endemic to the GAB freshwater springs, including Edgbastonia Coreena have tendencies to situate in the deepest areas of the spring, being significantly submerged underwater.

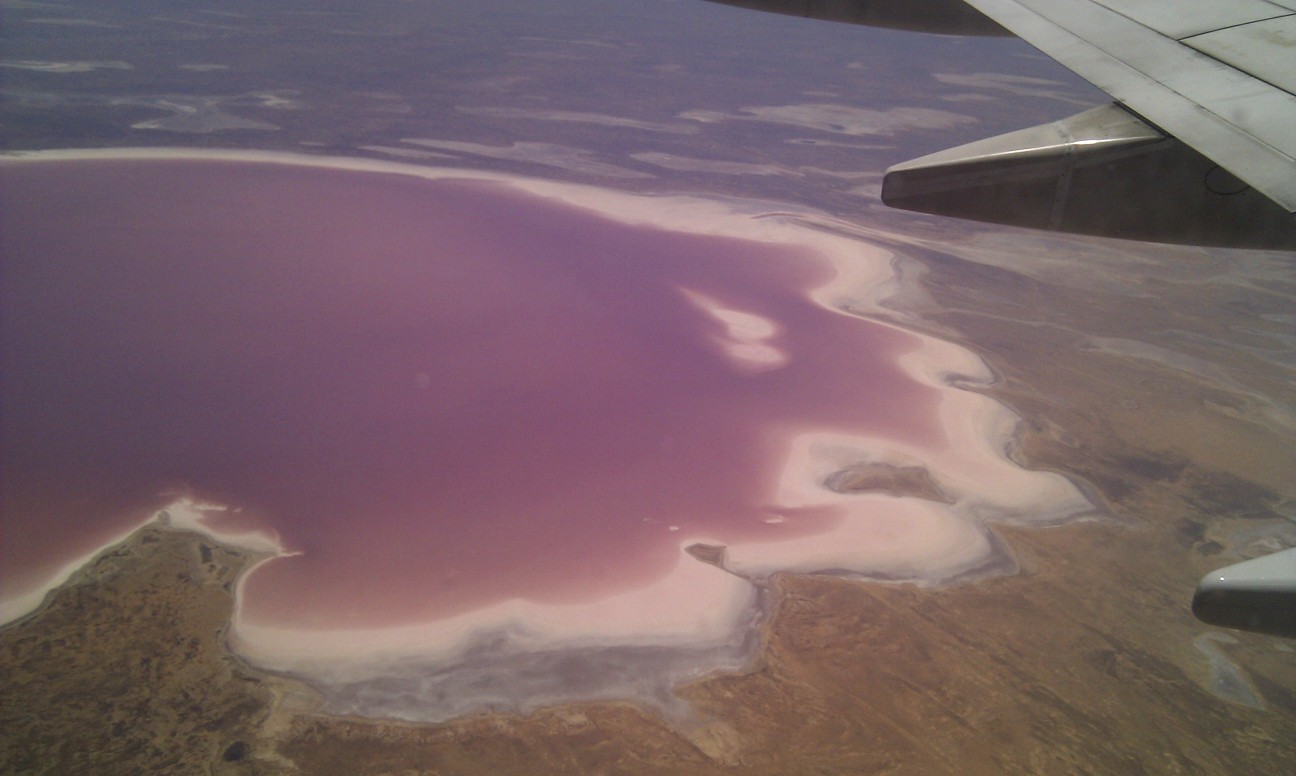
Aerial View of Lake Eyre

The general landscape of the varying springs in Pelican Creek and Lake Eyre approach 3000 and have maximum pool depths over 15 cm. Their pH ranges from 7.7 to 8.5 and conductivity of 735 to 965 or 500 to 800 depending on the specific spring.

The more “aquatic” species are more concentrated in their distribution because of the environmental stress of the spring condition brought on them whereas, the more “amphibious” were able to deal with the environment more effectively and therefore had a more relatively distributed concentration within the spring environment. Close species to the Edgbastonia Coreena, such as the Jardinella acuminata, Gyraulus edgbastonensis and Jardinella jesswiseae are among the more the species found predominantly in the larger springs and are also more restricted to the deeper areas of the pool, exposed to healthy amounts of water submergence.

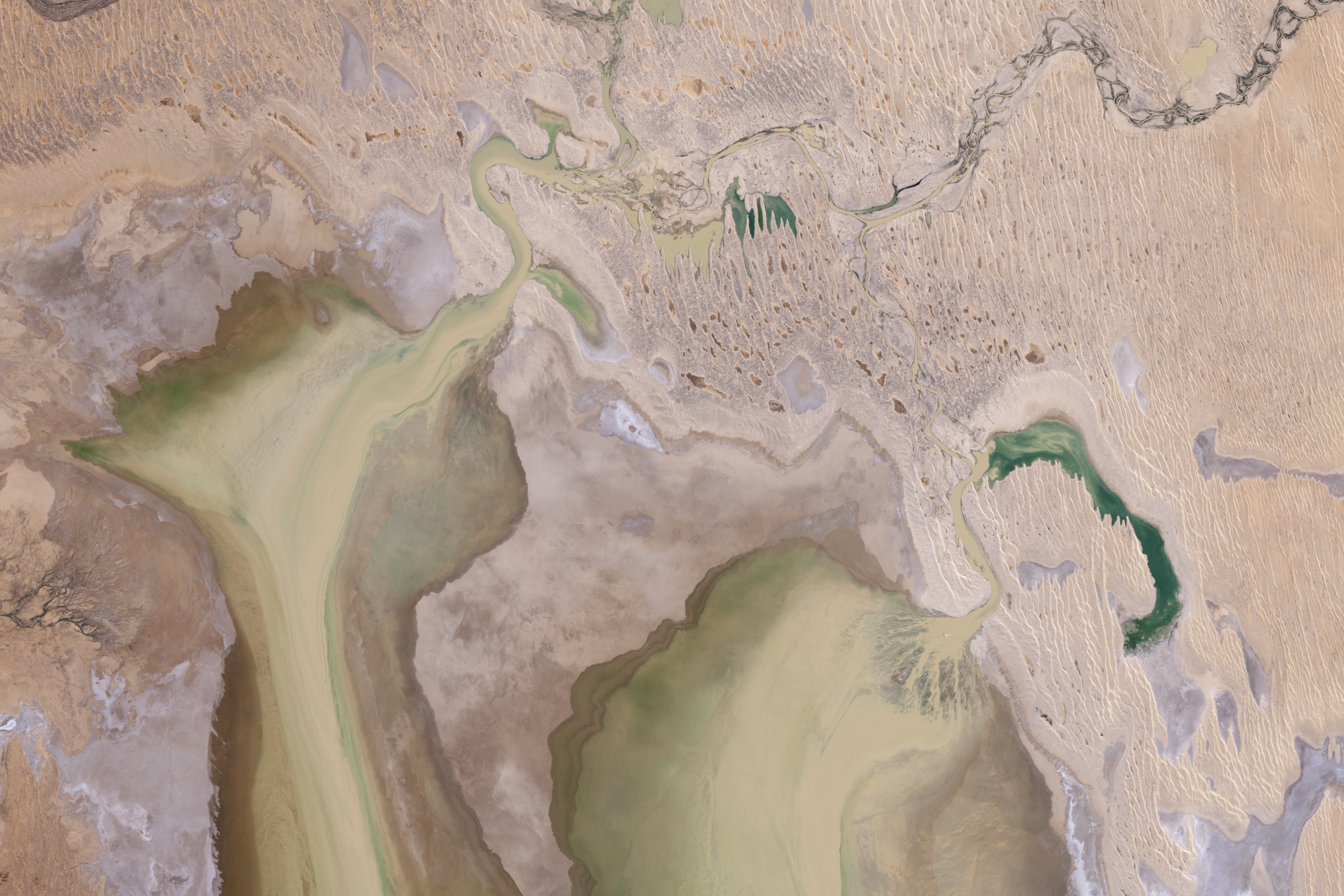
Lake Eyre in 2009

Wide variety of species closely related to Edgbastonia Coreena including Jardinella Acuminata, Jardinella Jessiwiseae, Jardinella edgbastonensis, Glyptophysa sp, Glyptophysa edgbastonensis and Glyptophysa fontana were subjected to the “dry treatment” in which no mortalities were resulted when placed in a pool environment. In the “tail” treatment of which freshwater availability is minimal, all species survived the 24hour time frame. However in the “dry” treatment where the environment is absent of freshwater, species mortality rose exponentially with Jardinella acuminata suffering 100% mortality rate. Other species such as Glyptophysa edgbastonensis and Jardinella jesswiseae were more tolerant, surviving the first hour with no mortalities that began occurring exponentially across a 24-hour time frame.

High amounts of conductivity was a stress factor significant to the stability of the freshwater springs. Jardinella species that were subjected to environments containing extreme amounts of freshwater electrical conductivity (approaching 10 mS/cm), had high mortality rates that increased to 100% by the end of 24-hour treatment across all species tested including Glyptophysa sp and Jardinella Jessiwiseae.

Temperature was the third factor regulating the environmental stability of freshwater endemic gastropod species (such as those of Jardinella family) where species such as Glyptophysa edgbastonensis were either in heat coma at temperatures reaching 50 or in a static, motionless state at temperatures under 10.

=== Behaviour ===
Edgbastonia Coreena, among other species are isolated due to their geographical disposition and are susceptible to allopatric speciation. Edgobastonia Coreena are found to be monophyletic, common among other neighbouring species, namely Jardinella accuminata, corrugate, edgbastonensis, jesswiseae, pallida, tumorosa and carnavonensis.

== See also ==
- List of non-marine molluscs of Australia
