= Dalhousie =

Dalhousie (/dælˈhaʊzi/ dal-HOW-zee), derived from the Scottish Earl of Dalhousie title of 1633, may refer to:

== Animals ==
- Dalhousie goby, species of fish found in central Australia
- Dalhousie hardyhead, species of fish found in central Australia
- Dalhousie catfish (Neosilurus gloveri), species of fish found in central Australia

== Buildings ==
- Dalhousie Castle, a castle near Bonnyrigg, Scotland
- Dalhousie Obelisk, a monument in Empress Place, Singapore
- Dalhousie Station (Canadian Pacific Railway), a former passenger rail station in Montreal, Quebec
- Dalhousie station (Calgary), a LRT station in Calgary, Alberta

== Institutions ==
- Dalhousie Hilltop School, Dalhousie, India
- Dalhousie School, a former prep school in Scotland
- Dalhousie University, located in Halifax, Nova Scotia
- HMIS (later INS) Dalhousie, the initial name of INS Angre, the naval base at Mumbai, India

== Ships ==
- Dalhousie, later name of HMS Hearty (1885)

== People and clans ==
- Clan Ramsay (Dalhousie), a branch of the main line of Scottish Ramsays
- Earl of Dalhousie, a title created in the Peerage of Scotland in 1633
- James Broun-Ramsay, 1st Marquess of Dalhousie, (1812–1860) a Governor-General of India
- George Ramsay, 9th Earl of Dalhousie, a Governor of Nova Scotia and of British North America

== Places ==
=== Australia ===
- County of Dalhousie, Victoria
- County of Dalhousie (South Australia)
- Dalhousie Springs, South Australia, a group of natural artesian springs
- Dalhousie Station (South Australia), a pastoral lease in the far north of South Australia

=== Canada ===
- Dalhousie Parish, New Brunswick
- Dalhousie, Calgary, a neighbourhood in the northwest area of the city
- Dalhousie, Quebec, a small town in south-western Quebec
- Port Dalhousie, Ontario, a community in St. Catharines
- West Dalhousie, a community in Nova Scotia
- Dalhousie Road, Nova Scotia, a community in Nova Scotia
- Dalhousie Ward, Ottawa. Former ward in Ottawa.

=== India ===
- Dalhousie, India, a town in Himachal Pradesh
- Dalhousie Cantonment, a cantonment town in Himachal Pradesh
- Dalhousie (Vidhan Sabha constituency), which includes the previous two towns
- Dalhousie Square, former name of the B. B. D. Bagh central business district of Kolkata

=== Scotland ===
- Dalhousie Mains, near Dalkeith and Bonnyrigg, former terminus of the Edinburgh and Dalkeith Railway

=== Sri Lanka ===
- Dalhousie, Sri Lanka, a town in Nuwara Eliya District

== See also ==
- Dalhousie Station (disambiguation)
