= Edgbaston (disambiguation) =

Edgbaston is a district of Birmingham, England.

Edgbaston may also refer to:

== England ==
- Edgbaston (ward), an electoral ward of the Birmingham City Council
- Edgbaston Cricket Ground, a cricket ground
- Birmingham Edgbaston (UK Parliament constituency), a UK parliament seat

== Australia ==
- Edgbaston Reserve, a nature reserve
