= Norda Stelo =

Engineering firm based in Québec City, Canada

Norda Stelo (Esperanto for "northern star"), formerly known as Roche Ltd, Consulting Group, is a Canadian construction company based in Quebec City. They specialise in integrated projects and operate in over 50 countries. Roche Ltd., Consulting Group was founded in 1963, in La Malbaie, Québec, in Canada. In 2013, they had more than 1,800 employees.

== History ==
In 1963, Charles-Eugène Rochette founded Charles-E. Rochette et associés in La Malbaie, in the Charlevoix region of Quebec. In its early days, the firm mainly offered engineering services. A few years later, Mr. Rochette joined forces with Marc Picard to found Picard, Rochette et associés. In order to ensure its expansion, the company was moved to Quebec City.

With the addition of new associates, Rochette, Lajoie, Grondin, Normand, Rochefort et associés was established in 1965. The 1970s marked the beginning of a growth period for Roche. Three new divisions were created: urban planning, transportation and environment.

In 1977, the firm entered the international market with a first contract in the agricultural sector, in Africa. Over the next few years, Roche opened several offices in Quebec — in Rimouski, on the Côte-Nord and in Thetford Mines — as well as in New Brunswick.

Over time, Roche diversified its services by creating new areas of activity within the company or associating with already established firms. The company became Roche Ltd, Consulting Group in 1984.

In 1991, it built its head office at 3075, chemin des Quatre-Bourgeois, in Quebec City, its present location.

== Projects and awards ==
=== Building ===
Roche, along with the CSC Group and other refrigeration companies, adapted the CO_{2} system to produce the 100% CO_{2} refrigerant system for the Marcel-Dutil arena, St-Gédéon de Beauce.

In 2006, Roche Award of Excellence from the Canadian Institute of Steel Construction. In 2010, Roche received an award for excellence in steel construction.

Centre Bombardier, La Pocatière— Structural, electrical and mechanical engineering for the design of this multipurpose complex. The building's electromechanical infrastructures were designed to recover 100% of the energy generated by the refrigeration systems in order to heat the domestic water, the bleachers’ heated floor, the ventilation air in the arena and several other areas. The project involved complex structural work due to the configuration of the concrete bleachers and by the fact that this building rests completely on pilings.

Salle Desjardins - Télus in Rimouski — Design and construction supervision of a new show hall with seating for over 900, as well as structural and civil engineering. The structure features two major components that combine concrete and steel for a complex and innovative architectural configuration.

Crystal de la Montagne in Montréal — Structural design of a multifunctional 27-story tower with four levels of underground parking. Carried out by Pasquin St-Jean, a member of Roche Ltd, Consulting Group.

IAQQ Armatura “award of the decade” in the residential category.

Caisse Populaire in Saint-Georges — A design using LED lighting. The LED's palette of colours allows for different settings and programs based on temperature, seasons and events. It used design using recyclable components. This was carried out by Ombrages, a member of Roche Ltd, Consulting Group.

=== Construction ===
Chauveau soccer complex in Quebec City— Unique construction of a covered stadium for the first sports complex in the Québec City area and the second such complex in the province to be built with laminated arches. The 1.86 metre-high wood arches support an over 80 metre roof span.

2011 Cecobois award of excellence in the “institutional building over 600 m2” category ».

Head office of the Sécurité Nature initiative in Saint-Augustin-de-Desmaures — Turnkey project. Design and construction of the Fédération québécoise des chasseurs et pêcheurs's head office. 2011 Cecobois award of excellence in the commercial building category.

Maison pour tous in Saint-Jean-Eudes — Made completely out of wood, this building features different multipurpose rooms, a childcare centre, a youth and Internet café and houses the Association féminine d’éducation et d’action sociale (AFEAS) St-Jean Eudes. The Roche Saguenay team designed the plans and specifications and supervised the construction work in collaboration with architect Alain Voyer.

Award of merit from the Réseau québécois de Villes et Villages santé.

=== Environment ===
Route 175 – Environmental monitoring The Ministère des Transports du Québec asked Roche to carry out the engineering work required to extend Highway 73 North and redevelop Route 175, as well as to conduct environmental surveillance on projects carried out between kilometres 84 and 227.

Bypass road in La Tuque - With the commitment and involvement of the stakeholders, its consulting engineers and others, the transport minister sustainably carried out this over $80 million dollar project, which required moving 4,200,000 tons of earthmoving equipment and building over 15 km of road, 19 large culverts, 4 intersections with safe left turn lanes, divisional islands and lighting, 3 bridges, one bicycle path and the implementation of original solutions to protect the environment and bodies of water.

=== Forestry ===
La Romaine hydroelectric project- Carried out engineering work prior to the first construction phase of the project's accesses and crossings, which included the first 48 km of road, the crossing of Rivière Romaine and related works.

=== Real estate ===
Blũ Rivage in Longueuil — The residential development consists of 220 condominium-style apartments, spanning out over 25 floors. Totalling over 370,000 square feet of surface area and requiring nearly 1,500 metric tons of steel for reinforcement The project received recognition for several of its innovative solutions.

2011 Armatura award in the residential category « Résidentielle ».

=== Transportation ===
Quai de croisière, La Baie — Design of a cruise wharf capable of accommodating large ships like the Queen Mary 2. Made up of 8 mooring dolphins on pilings, this project also includes a floating platform that adjusts to the tide, pedestrian walkways and all wharf equipment required to accommodate these types of ships.

2008 – won the Award of Merit from the Ordre des ingénieurs du Québec (OIQ).

Boulevard Robert Bourassa in Québec City — Prepared the plans and specifications required to extend Boulevard Robert-Bourassa (formerly the Vallon highway)

2008 – Innovative project award from the Ordre des ingénieurs du Québec (OIQ).

Churchill Bridge in Labrador — Design of a 360-metre-long bridge and its innovative launch over the Churchill River. This bridge, built as part of a turnkey contract, connects Labrador to the Trans Canada road network.

2007 – Innovative Steel Construction award by the Canadian Institute of Steel Construction.

Boulevard Duplessis in Quebec City — Updated the preliminary design, prepared the preliminary and definitive plans and specifications and supervised the work. Project to redevelop the highway (4 to 6 divided lanes, in a dense urban environment over 1 km). Rehabilitating the ramps (7), secondary roads totalling 2.4 km and an overpass. Reinforced concrete retaining walls on either side of the highway, over an approximately 650 m stretch.

Sceau d'Or award from the Association de la construction du Québec (ACQ), Canadian transportation sector.

=== Municipal infrastructure ===
Rehabilitating underground infrastructures for the City of Quebec - Rehabilitating 2 km of underground infrastructures serving 3e avenue, Benoit XV and10e rue in Quebec City's Limoilou district.

Lift footbridge, Ile Ronde, Beauceville - Roche carried out preparatory studies and submitted requests for authorization. They coordinated and designed the structure, including the lift system, and the pilings of the lift footbridge.

=== International ===
Modernization and extension of the Bamako-Sénou International Airport - Roche coordinated the implementation of the modernization and extension program for the Bamako-Sénou Airport in Mali, West Africa

Program to fight climate change, Egypt — Technological transfer for the purposes of converting 50 brick manufacturing plants to natural gas, a project carried out in the framework of a public-private partnership. Reducing the CO_{2} generated by these industrial facilities by 37%, it resulted in 100,000 fewer tons of greenhouse gases being released into Earth's atmosphere.

Trophée Léonard from the Association des ingénieurs-conseils du Québec (AICQ), in the international category
Trophée Léonard de l’Association des ingénieurs-conseils du Québec (AICQ), dans la catégorie « International ». ».

=== Distinctions ===
- Défi Meilleurs Employeurs, 1er prix de la catégorie grande entreprise.

== Offices ==
=== Canada ===
- Quebec City
- Montreal
- Saguenay
- Alma
- Asbestos
- Baie-Comeau
- Bécancour
- Berthierville
- Bonaventure
- Châteauguay
- Chibougamau
- Dalhousie
- Dolbeau-Mistassini
- Drummondville
- Edmundston
- Gaspé
- Gatineau
- Havre-Saint-Pierre
- Les Îles-de-la-Madeleine
- Joliette
- Kuujjuaq
- L'Ascension-de-Notre-Seigneur
- La Malbaie
- Labrador City
- Lac-Mégantic
- La Pocatière
- Laval
- Lévis
- Longueuil
- Malartic
- Mingan
- Montmagny
- New Richmond
- Rimouski
- Rivière-du-Loup
- Roberval
- Rouyn-Noranda
- Saint-Georges
- Saint-Jérôme
- Saint-Léonard
- Sainte-Adèle
- Salaberry-de-Valleyfield
- Sept-Îles
- Shawinigan
- Sherbrooke
- Thetford Mines
- Trois-Rivières
- Victoriaville
- Vancouver

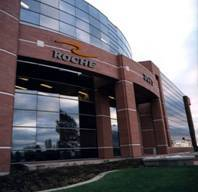
Roche's head office: 3075, ch. des Quatre-Bourgeois Bureau 300, in Quebec City. Building erected in 1991.

=== Internationales ===
- New Caledonia - Nouméa
- United States - Salt Lake City
- Algeria - Algiers
- France - Izon
- Senegal - Dakar
