= County of Dalhousie =

County of Dalhousie may refer to:

- County of Dalhousie (South Australia)
- County of Dalhousie, Victoria

== See also ==
- Dalhousie (disambiguation)
