= Solanum adoxum =

Conservation status
- Critically Endangered (NCA)

Scientific classification
- Kingdom: Plantae
- Clade: Tracheophytes
- Clade: Angiosperms
- Clade: Eudicots
- Clade: Asterids
- Order: Solanales
- Family: Solanaceae
- Genus: Solanum
- Species: S. adoxum

Binomial name
- Solanum adoxum A.R.Bean

Species of shrub

Solanum adoxum is a sprawling rhizomatous perennial which is endemic to Queensland.

== Distribution and habitat ==
Solanum adoxum is only known from three areas, Ravenswood Station, Edgbaston Reserve, and east of Muttaburra at Sumana Station. At Edgbaston Reserve and Sumana Station, S. adoxum grows on sand dunes with Triodia longiceps. At Ravenswood, it has been observed growing in areas cleared of Acacia cambagei (Gidgee) on sandy soil.

== Phenology ==
Flowers and fruits have been observed in April and May.

== Conservation status ==
Solanum adoxum is listed as "critically endangered" under the Queensland Nature Conservation Act 1992. It is not listed under the Australian Government Environment Protection and Biodiversity Conservation Act 1999.
