= Elizabeth Springs =

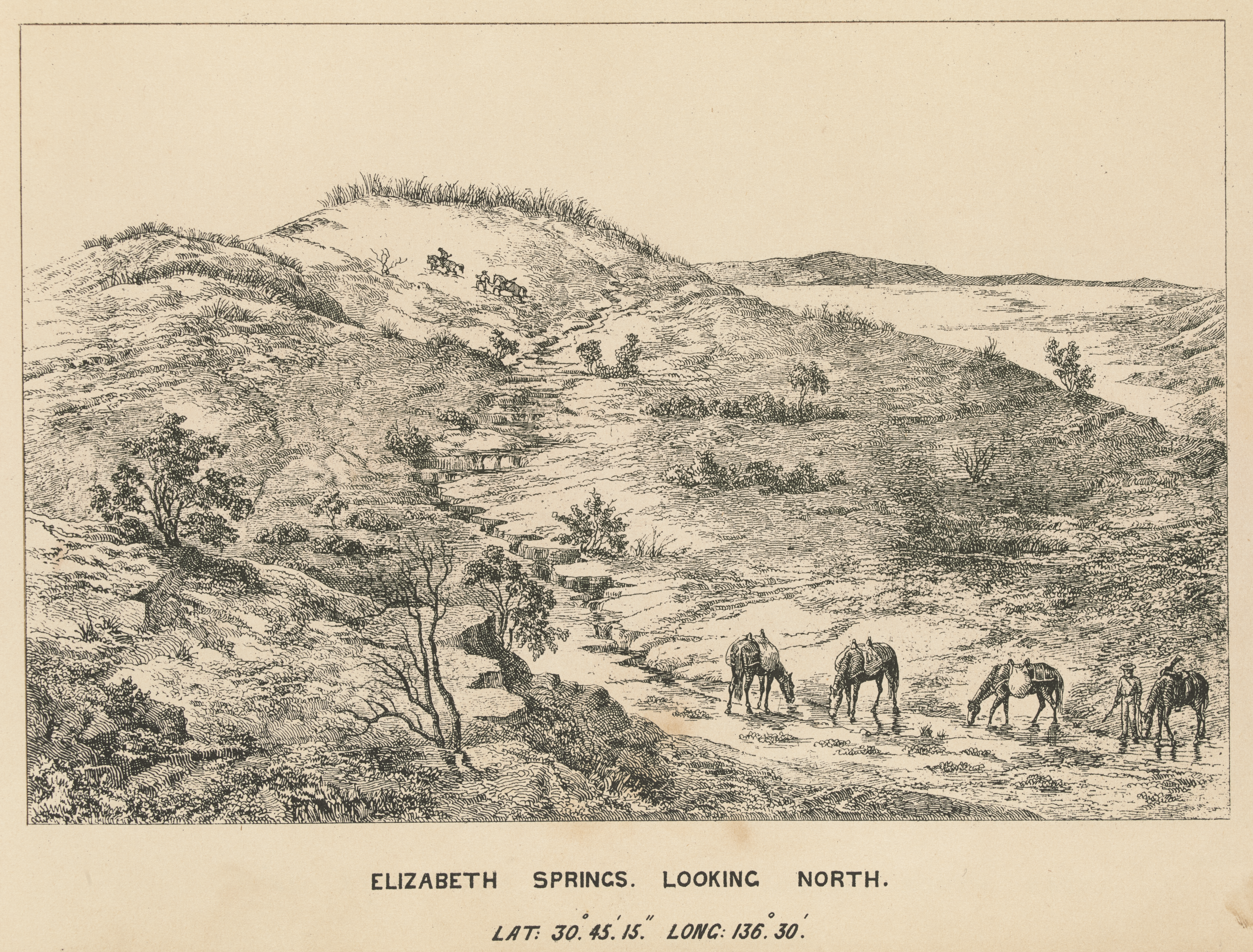
- "Elizabeth Springs, looking north", artwork by George French Angas, 1859

- Location within Queensland
- 23.3420°S 140.5832°E
- Location: Diamantina Lakes, Shire of Diamantina, Queensland, Australia

Australian National Heritage List
- Official name: Great Artesian Basin Springs: Elizabeth
- Type: Listed place (Natural)
- Designated: 4 August 2009
- Reference no.: 105821

Elizabeth Springs is a heritage-listed artesian springs in Diamantina Lakes, Shire of Diamantina, Queensland, Australia. It is one of the springs of the Great Artesian Basin (GAB). It was added to the Australian National Heritage List on 4 August 2009.

== History ==
Aboriginal Australians have used the artesian springs of the GAB for an extended period of time. Some of these GAB artesian springs feature in Aboriginal myths and hold significant spiritual and cultural values for indigenous communities. Artesian springs were, and still are, a valuable resource for the support of wildlife, and were a vital source of fresh water in an arid environment.

The need for fresh water was also obvious to the first European settlers who ventured west of the Great Dividing Range. These early settlers, encouraged by good seasons, brought their sheep and cattle out onto the great rolling plains. They soon learned that inland Australia was a harsh environment where droughts were common.

The inland of Australia is traversed by streams but these rarely flow and have few permanent waterholes. Unpredictable rainfall and high evaporation meant that early dams and earth tanks built to service the growing population and pastoral industry were unreliable. Permanent water supplies were needed to allow livestock to survive on the arid plains and to provide supplies for the growing service towns.

Europeans first discovered the artesian groundwater of the GAB in 1878 when a shallow bore sunk near Bourke in New South Wales produced flowing water. Many bores were soon drilled near the margins of the GAB in New South Wales and South Australia. In 1885 the Queensland Government Geologist decided to drill a deep bore at Blackall to try to prove the existence of deep artesian supplies in Queensland and provide reliable water supplies during the drought. However, before the completion of this bore, the first artesian flow in Queensland was obtained near Cunnamulla in 1887.

The number of bores drilled in Queensland increased from 34 to 524 in the ten-year period from 1889 to 1899. By 1915 over 1,500 flowing artesian bores had been drilled throughout the Basin. The assurance of a reliable water supply for settlers and their stock meant the development of a valuable sheep and cattle industry. Thousands of kilometres of bore drains were excavated to distribute water around properties, thus allowing sheep and cattle to be raised on the vast Mitchell grass, mulga and spinifex plains. Bore drains are small, open channels that can extend 100 kilometres or more.

The water from the GAB continues to be of vital importance to outback regions of Queensland, New South Wales and South Australia. This water is often the only available supply for towns and properties for their domestic and stockwatering requirements. The GAB also supplies water for minor irrigation works, key mining and extractive industries, the petroleum industry, an emerging tourism industry and limited industrial purposes. Sound management of this important natural resource by the present users will ensure that future generations may also benefit from this reliable water source.

== Description ==
Elizabeth Springs is at about 101ha, comprising Lot 1 on SP120220.

The Great Artesian Basin is one of the largest artesian systems in the world and occupies about 22% of the Australian continent. Artesian springs lie around the rim of the GAB, occurring in complexes of springs known as a "supergroup", and are the natural outlets of the artesian aquifers from which groundwater of the GAB flows to the surface.

The artesian springs, also known as mound springs, are loosely divided into recharge springs and discharge springs. Recharge springs are primarily found along the GAB's eastern rim on the Great Dividing Range where the GAB aquifers outcrop in an area of relatively high rainfall allowing recharge. The recharge springs release excess GAB recharge water or, in topographic lows intercept the GAB recharge aquifers. The western margin of the GAB also has an area where the GAB aquifers outcrop but recharge is minimal as rainfall is low and intermittent. Discharge springs are those that release groundwater that has entered the GAB from the recharge zones, which flows towards the GAB's southern, southwestern, western and northern margins. Groundwater dating research has found that water in furthest areas from the recharge areas has been moving through the GAB's porous rock strata (aquifers) for up to a million years. Elizabeth Springs are regarded as a discharge spring complex and consists of at least five active artesian mound springs together with a few semi-active mounds immediately adjacent.

There are eleven supergroups in the main part of the GAB extending from Bourke in New South Wales and Lake Eyre in South Australia, and two outlier spring supergroups on Cape York Peninsula, including one on the Peninsula's northern tip. The GAB springs and spring complexes number around six hundred, but one "spring" may represent between two and four hundred spring outlets and supergroups may be regional clusters of such springs, often covering relatively small areas. GAB springs range in size from small springs only a few metres across such as Bundoona Springs, in southern Queensland, to major complexes of up to sixty springs with quite large pools such as Dalhousie Springs, in northern South Australia. Some GAB artesian springs have associated discharge mounds that consist of mud, but most of the springs deposit calcium carbonate, especially the discharge springs, or other salts from the mineral-rich waters discharging from the springs. These evaporites typically form characteristic salt deposits around the spring outflow that can extend for several hundred metres as a distinctive white tail, sometimes yellow or even black, often with a central carbonate mound grading into sulphate and chloride salts. In many instances, particularly among South Australian GAB springs, these deposits combine with wind-blown sand, mud and accumulated plant debris to form mounds around the spring outflow, with the resulting formation resembling a small volcano, colloquially called a "mound spring". Many of the Queensland GAB springs are "softer" and fail to develop anything more substantial than a mound of a few centimetres to a few metres in height, hence the use of the more readily interpreted term of "artesian spring" rather than "mound spring".

Mound formation of GAB springs is controlled by a range of factors, including groundwater discharge and evaporation rates, hydrochemistry, influence of organic versus organic carbonate precipitation and local subsidence of the mound. Dating of GAB springs using thermoluminescence, uranium-thorium and carbon-14 dating of quartzose sands and carbonate springs deposits have produced dates of more than 740,000± years. Research has found large spring complex deposits reflect geological and hydrological changes in eastern and central Australia during the last Quaternary (last 2.6 million years) and provide an understanding of long-term changes prior to human intervention.

Groundwater dating, using carbon-14 and chlorine-36 studies, has found water aged several thousand years near recharge areas and more than a million years near the centre of the GAB. The groundwater moves slowly, at less than one metre per year to approximately five metres per year, generally in a south, southwest, west direction and also northwards in the northern portion of the GAB.

Elizabeth Springs form part of the Springvale River supergroup, one of the two most westerly supergroups in Queensland, and lie approximately 300 kilometres south-southeast of Mount Isa. The Springvale supergroup is a group of springs that, with the exception of Elizabeth Springs, are largely extinct or heavily modified. The main group of springs comprising Elizabeth Springs extends over an area of approximately 400 by 500 metres and consists of a series of low mounds and travertine-encrusted outflows. The mounds and surrounding outflows and seepages are well vegetated with sedges and a range of other species including large areas of the spring endemic Eriocaulon carsonii subsp. carsonii, the salt pipewort, which is a perennial and a nationally EPBC-listed threatened species.

GAB artesian springs are a significant refuge in arid and semi-arid Australia, providing one of the few sources of natural permanent water. Estimates of the age of artesian springs have concluded that individual springs may last for up to a few hundred thousand years, but spring groups collectively may last possibly up to several million years. The presence of such permanent freshwater in inland Australia over the past few million years has provided habitat for a wide array of fish, invertebrates and plants that have been "stranded" in GAB artesian springs as inland Australia has dried out.

Ecologically GAB artesian springs are considered an evolutionary refuge as they allow wetland dependent (specialised habitat) species to persist as their original geographic range becomes uninhabitable due to drying over an extended period of time because of climatic change.

With the contraction of their main range, relictual species are hypothesised to have evolved different characteristics from their original stock, leading to the high levels of endemism (the frequency of species with restricted distributions) in isolated GAB artesian spring groups. Hence artesian springs provide the localised habitat requirements for a suite of endemic (restricted to one or more GAB spring) fish and aquatic invertebrate species which include hydrobiid molluscs, isopods, ostracods, amphipods, copepods and flatworms.

GAB artesian springs hold plants and animals that have evolved into new species found nowhere else. The presence of endemic species, and large peat mounds, indicates that some GAB springs have been active for a very long time. Hydrobiid snails are the best studied of these endemic groups. Hydrobiid snails are the most diverse of all freshwater gastropods and frequently have small distribution ranges, resulting in high levels of endemism. This makes them excellent candidates for evolutionary studies on endemism and speciation and for use as potential indicators (surrogates) of the importance of environments such as GAB artesian springs for other, less well-studied freshwater taxa. Hydrobiid snails are particularly well represented in GAB artesian springs with well over 23 taxa and five genera, although each mound complex or aggregation is separated by hundreds of kilometres. It has been hypothesised that this is a result of ancestral Gondwanan hydrobiids being stranded by the increasing aridity of inland Australia and being isolated in the permanent waters of GAB artesian springs. Recent work has demonstrated that the GAB hydrobiid snails have evolved in three separate radiations, one in Queensland and two in South Australia, with the Queensland hydrobiids and those of South Australia being completely unrelated.

The Elizabeth Springs, on its own and collectively with the other significant discharge springs comprising the GAB springs, are notable examples of the endemism exhibited by GAB artesian springs. Elizabeth Springs has one endemic snail and one endemic fish. It also has four endemic GAB artesian spring plant species as well as five relict spring plant species, plants that have survived from when inland Australia was wetter. A number of other possible endemic invertebrates also exist at the springs. In addition at least one species of frog, four species of reptile, 50 species of birds, four species of mammals, and 13 species of plants are known from the vicinity of the springs from a species list generated by the Australian Natural Heritage Assessment Tool, and as detailed in a Queensland Herbarium report based on comprehensive ground surveys.

=== Condition ===
Surveys over the last twenty years have shown that most of the remaining active GAB artesian springs in Queensland are suffering damage from draw-down or stock. Trampling by stock or modification of the spring to improve access for stock is a serious threat to GAB springs. Trampling (also known as pugging) modifies the physical structure of the microhabitat, which are small scale habitat zones with different environment conditions, and if serious enough, removes the microhabitat entirely. Modification of the spring, normally by digging the spring out to improve the pooling of water, removes the microhabitat altogether.

In 2004 there was evidence of cattle grazing within the Elizabeth Springs reserve, with some trampling of the seepages and outflows surrounding the mounds. However, since fencing after 2004 the overall condition of the Elizabeth Springs has vastly improved reducing the previous impacts on the intact relictual biota.

The endemic species associated with GAB artesian springs, particularly the vascular plants and invertebrates, appear to be highly sensitive to changes in water flow or conditions at the springs. This is at least in part due to the dependence of many species on microhabitats such as seepages of only a few millimetres depth. A range of human activities that have been occurring over the last 120 years impacts GAB artesian springs. The most serious is groundwater extraction resulting in draw-down of water pressure at the spring, primarily but not exclusively due to numerous uncapped artesian bores and inefficient earth drains, and the loss or modification of microhabitat and ultimately the extinction of the spring. Groundwater extraction has been implicated in the extinction of many springs and has been partly addressed by the extensive GAB bore-capping programme. Extraction for other uses such as mining and town water supply remains a substantial impact. Reductions in flow at Elizabeth Springs have been observed, although in some other springs flow appears to have stabilised. Draw-down remains the most serious threat to GAB artesian springs.

Lastly, the spread of the introduced mosquitofish (Gambusia affinis) is a threat to the freshwater endemics of all the GAB artesian springs. Gambusia has not been reported from Elizabeth Springs.

The GAB Sustainability Initiative (GABSI) is a jointly funded initiative of the Federal and State governments and pastoral bore owners. GABSI aims to preserve the pressure of the Great Artesian Basin, and reduce water waste, through rehabilitating uncontrolled bores and replacing bore drains with polyethylene pipes, tanks and troughs for livestock water. Although a substantial number of bores are now being fully controlled with water distributed by pipelines to tanks and troughs, about 80% of the total outflow from the Basin is still wasted because of inefficient water delivery systems.

This condition report drew on a number of source.

== Heritage listing ==
Elizabeth Springs is one of a suite of nationally important artesian springs in the Great Artesian Basin, which is the world's largest artesian basin. The artesian springs have been the primary natural source of permanent water in most of the Australian arid zone over the last 1.8 Million years (the Pleistocene and Holocene periods). These artesian springs, also known as mound springs, provide vital habitat for more widespread terrestrial vertebrates and invertebrates with aquatic larval young, and are a unique feature of the arid Australian landscape.

As these artesian springs are some distance from each other in the Australian inland, and individually each one covers a relatively tiny area, their isolation has allowed the freshwater animal lineages to evolve into distinct species, which include fish, aquatic invertebrates (crustacean and freshwater snail species) and wetland plants. This results in a high level of endemism, or species that are found nowhere else in the world.

Elizabeth Springs is nationally significant as it holds a suite of species which are genetically and evolutionarily distinct from other Great Artesian Basin springs, including an endemic freshwater snail and an endemic fish species. Elizabeth Springs also holds four of the eleven known Great Artesian Basin spring wetland endemic plants, along with five plant species not recorded within 500 kilometres of the springs, which are indicative of a wetter past.

Elizabeth Springs is the only remaining relatively intact Great Artesian Basin spring with extant biota (fauna and flora) in far western Queensland and is regarded as one of the most important artesian springs because of its isolation, intactness and the extinction of other springs. Over 74% of the artesian springs in Queensland are extinct (no longer flowing) and all the artesian springs in New South Wales are extinct or badly damaged.

Elizabeth Springs was listed on the Australian National Heritage List on 4 August 2009 having satisfied the following criteria.

Criterion A: Events, Processes

Elizabeth Springs is one of a suite of important artesian discharge springs in the Great Artesian Basin for endemic fish, invertebrates (including hydrobiid gastropod molluscs) and plants, and has also been ranked by CSIRO as a nationally "significant" semi-arid and arid refugia in Australia for regional endemics of aquatic invertebrates (isopods, ostracods, and hydrobiid molluscs) and fish.

GAB artesian springs are important for illustrating the role of evolutionary refugia for relict species, which have evolved into distinct and endemic species in the GAB springs. Elizabeth Springs contains one artesian spring endemic hydrobiid snail, Jardinella isolata; an endemic fish species the Elizabeth Springs goby Chlamydogobius micropterus (, and four of the 11 known GAB spring wetland endemic plants. Elizabeth Springs contains the threatened saltmarsh pipewort (Eriocaulon carsonii subsp. carsonii), a relict species of tropical Australia that is largely endemic to the artesian springs of the GAB. They also contain three of the other GAB spring endemics: Eragrostis fenshamii, Fimbristylis sp. and Myriophyllum artesium. Elizabeth Springs also contains five other relict plant species, which are not recorded within 500 km of the springs: Isotoma fluviatilis, Pennisetum alopecuroides, Plantago gaudichaudii, Schoenus falcatus and Utricularia caerulea.

Criterion B: Rarity

Extant artesian springs in the GAB are a geographically rare phenomenon, each one covering a tiny area within the basin. Over 74% of the GAB springs in Queensland are extinct (no longer flowing) and all the GAB artesian springs in New South Wales are extinct or badly damaged. Elizabeth Springs is regarded as one of the most important GAB artesian springs because of its isolation, relative intactness and the extinction of other springs in far Western Queensland.

Criterion D: Principal characteristics of a class of places

The GAB is the world's largest example of an artesian basin and associated artesian springs. GAB artesian springs are the primary sources of permanent fresh water within the arid zone since at least the late Pleistocene (the last 1.8 million years) and are therefore a unique feature of the arid Australian landscape. As the primary natural source of permanent fresh water in most of the arid zone, GAB artesian springs represent vital habitat for more widespread terrestrial vertebrates, and invertebrates with aquatic larvae. Elizabeth Springs is one of a suite of important artesian discharge GAB Springs that are outstanding examples of the endemism exhibited by artesian springs individually and collectively. Species found at Elizabeth Springs include an endemic freshwater hydrobiid snail Jardinella isolata, and an endemic fish species, the Elizabeth Springs goby Chlamydogobius micropterus. Elizabeth Springs is the only remaining relatively intact GAB spring with extant biota (fauna and flora) in far Western Queensland and holds a suite of species which are genetically and evolutionarily distinct from other GAB springs.
