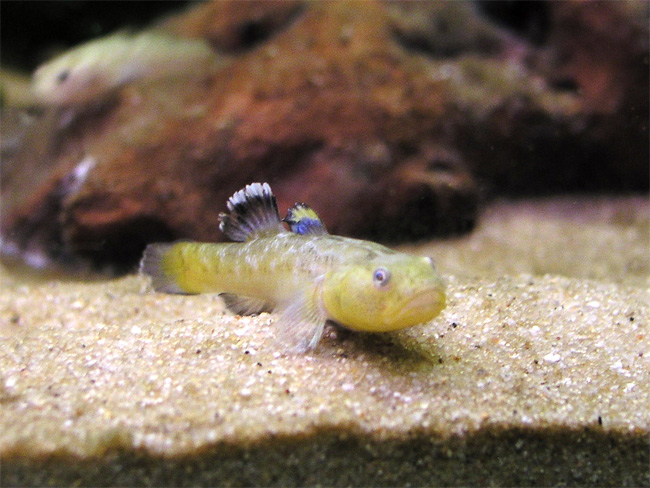
- Desert goby (C. eremius)

Scientific classification
- Kingdom: Animalia
- Phylum: Chordata
- Class: Actinopterygii
- Division: Teleostei
- Order: Gobiiformes
- Family: Oxudercidae
- Subfamily: Gobionellinae
- Genus: Chlamydogobius; Whitley, 1930

Type species
- Gobius eremius Zietz, 1896

= Chlamydogobius =

Genus of fishes

Chlamydogobius is a genus of gobies from Australia. All but one coastal species (C. ranunculus) are found in inland waters, such as springs, pools, creeks and streams.

Most species live in extreme environments; for example, several species of Chlamydogobius are found in the water that emerges from geothermal springs, such as the Dalhousie goby, found in the waters around Dalhousie Springs.

These fish can live in water with a wide range of temperatures, pH, salinity, and oxygen levels; for example they are found in water with a pH between 6.8 and 9.0, and temperatures between 3 and 43 °C (37–109 °F). They can tolerate salinity as high as 60 parts per thousand (almost twice that of sea water). They have been found in water with extremely low oxygen levels (as low as 0.8 ppm). Their water habitats often exhibit oxygen levels below 5 milligrams of oxygen per litre.

To cope with extremely low oxygen levels, they will emerge from the water to "gulp" air (known as aerial respiration). They also will position themselves over beds of algae to capture the produced oxygen.

They will hide in the mud and silt at the bottom of a stream, or in a plant or under a rock to avoid more extreme water temperatures. Sometimes they will emerge from very hot water for brief periods to take advantage of evaporative cooling.

They can survive even if there are drought conditions that reduce the size of their habitat. If there is a flood that results in drastically increased water flow, they anchor themselves to rocks with their pelvic fins.

Chlamydogobius fish are able to change their colours to blend in with their environments.

Human drilling activities in Australia have often reduced the pressure of the aquifers that feed the Australian hot springs that Chlamydogobius rely on, so some species are endangered.

== Species ==
There are currently six recognized species in this genus:

- Chlamydogobius eremius (Zietz, 1896) (Desert goby)
- Chlamydogobius gloveri Larson, 1995 (Dalhousie goby)
- Chlamydogobius japalpa Larson, 1995 (Finke goby)
- Chlamydogobius micropterus Larson, 1995 (Elizabeth springs goby)
- Chlamydogobius ranunculus Larson, 1995 (Tadpole goby)
- Chlamydogobius squamigenus Larson, 1995 (Edgbaston goby)
