= Dalhousie Station =

Dalhousie Station may represent:

- Dalhousie Station, Quebec, a town in Quebec
- Dalhousie station (Calgary), a CTrain light rail station in Calgary, Alberta, Canada
- Dalhousie Station (Canadian Pacific Railway), a former railway station in Montreal, Quebec, Canada
- Dalhousie Station (South Australia), a pastoral lease in South Australia

== See also ==
- Dalhousie (disambiguation)
