= Edgbastonia colmani =

Conservation status
- Critically Endangered (IUCN 2.3)

Scientific classification
- Kingdom: Animalia
- Phylum: Mollusca
- Class: Gastropoda
- Subclass: Caenogastropoda
- Order: Littorinimorpha
- Family: Tateidae
- Genus: Edgbastonia
- Species: E. colmani

Binomial name
- Edgbastonia colmani (Ponder & Clark, 1990)

Synonyms
- Edgbastonia (Barcaldinia) colmani (Ponder & G. A. Clark, 1990)· accepted, alternate representation; Jardinella colmani Ponder & G. A. Clark, 1990

Species of gastropod

Edgbastonia colmani is a species of small freshwater snail, an aquatic gastropod mollusc in the family Tateidae.

This species is endemic to Australia.

== See also ==
- List of non-marine molluscs of Australia
