= Edgbastonia =

Scientific classification
- Kingdom: Animalia
- Phylum: Mollusca
- Class: Gastropoda
- Subclass: Caenogastropoda
- Order: Littorinimorpha
- Superfamily: Truncatelloidea
- Family: Tateidae
- Genus: Edgbastonia; Ponder, 2008

Type species
- Edgbastonia alanwillsi Ponder, 2008

Synonyms
- Edgbastonia (Barcaldinia) Ponder, W.-H. Zhang, Hallan & Shea, 2019· accepted, alternate representation; Edgbastonia (Edgbastonia) Ponder, 2008· accepted, alternate representation

Genus of gastropods

Jardinella is a genus of small freshwater snails, aquatic gastropod mollusks in the family Tateidae.

== Species ==
- Edgbastonia acuminata (Ponder & G. A. Clark, 1990)
- Edgbastonia alanwillsi Ponder, 2008
- Edgbastonia chillagoensis Ponder, W.-H. Zhang, Hallan & Shea, 2019
- Edgbastonia colmani (Ponder & G. A. Clark, 1990)
- Edgbastonia conjuboyensis Ponder, W.-H. Zhang, Hallan & Shea, 2019
- Edgbastonia coreena (Ponder & G. A. Clark, 1990)
- Edgbastonia corrugata (Ponder & G. A. Clark, 1990)
- Edgbastonia edgbastonensis (Ponder & G. A. Clark, 1990)
- Edgbastonia hufferensis Ponder, W.-H. Zhang, Hallan & Shea, 2019
- Edgbastonia jesswisseae (Ponder & G. A. Clark, 1990)
- Edgbastonia pagoda Ponder, W.-H. Zhang, Hallan & Shea, 2019
- Edgbastonia pallida (Ponder & G. A. Clark, 1990)
- Edgbastonia routhensis Ponder, W.-H. Zhang, Hallan & Shea, 2019
- Edgbastonia rugosa Ponder, W.-H. Zhang, Hallan & Shea, 2019
- Edgbastonia zeidlerorum (Ponder & G. A. Clark, 1990)
