= Edgbaston goby =

Conservation status
- Critically Endangered (IUCN 3.1)

Scientific classification
- Kingdom: Animalia
- Phylum: Chordata
- Class: Actinopterygii
- Division: Teleostei
- Order: Gobiiformes
- Family: Oxudercidae
- Genus: Chlamydogobius
- Species: C. squamigenus

Binomial name
- Chlamydogobius squamigenus Larson, 1995

Species of fish

Edgbaston Goby (Chlamydogobius squamigenus) in Australia

Chlamydogobius squamigenus, the Edgbaston goby, is a critically endangered species of goby endemic to the Edgbaston Reserve in Central Queensland, Australia where it occurs in small pools with clay bottoms and emergent tussock grasses. This species can reach a length of 4.8 centimetres (1.9 in) SL. The red-finned blue-eye, 11 snail species, a small crustacean, a flatworm, a spider and a dragonfly are restricted to the same springs and also threatened.
