= Elizabeth Springs goby =

Conservation status
- Vulnerable (IUCN 3.1)

Scientific classification
- Kingdom: Animalia
- Phylum: Chordata
- Class: Actinopterygii
- Order: Gobiiformes
- Family: Oxudercidae
- Genus: Chlamydogobius
- Species: C. micropterus

Binomial name
- Chlamydogobius micropterus Larson, 1995

Species of fish

Chlamydogobius micropterus, the Elizabeth Springs goby, is a species of goby endemic to Elizabeth Springs in the Shire of Diamantina, Queensland, Australia where it occurs in shallow, marshy pools. This species can reach a length of 3 centimetres (1.2 in) SL.
