= Red-finned blue-eye =

Conservation status
- Critically Endangered (IUCN 3.1)

Scientific classification
- Kingdom: Animalia
- Phylum: Chordata
- Class: Actinopterygii
- Division: Teleostei
- Order: Atheriniformes
- Suborder: Atherinoidei
- Family: Pseudomugilidae
- Genus: Scaturiginichthys; Ivantsoff, Unmack, Saeed & Crowley, 1991
- Species: S. vermeilipinnis

Binomial name
- Scaturiginichthys vermeilipinnis Ivantsoff, Unmack, Saeed & Crowley, 1991

Species of fish

The red-finned blue-eye (Scaturiginichthys vermeilipinnis) is a tiny, critically endangered species of fish in the family Pseudomugilidae. It is the only species in its genus. The species was first recorded in 1990. It is endemic to central Queensland in Australia, where it is restricted to springs in Bush Heritage's Edgbaston Reserve.

== Description ==
The fish reaches up to 3 cm (1 in) in length, and only males have red fins.

== Habitat and distribution ==
The fish only live in shallow, slightly salty water in Edgbaston Reserve, which is owned by Bush Heritage Australia. The water in the springs can vary from near freezing in the winter to 40 °C (104 °F) in the summer.

== Conservation status ==
It is listed as Critically Endangered on the IUCN Red List, and as Endangered under Queensland's Nature Conservation Act 1992. In September 2012, the species was placed on the International Union for Conservation of Nature list of 100 most endangered species on the planet. It was originally found in seven springs in its small range in the Edgbaston Reserve, but by 2012 only survived in three of these, although another three translocated populations existed in the reserve. By 2021 were only found in one spring.

They are at risk from extinction due to competition and predation by the flourishing introduced eastern mosquitofish (Gambusia holbrooki), water extraction and habitat loss. Gambusia is a huge threat as an invasive species, which is out-competing many species in Australia.

An intensive conservation programme has been developed to save the species. The Edgbaston goby (Chlamydogobius squamigenus), 11 snail species, a small crustacean, a flatworm, a spider and a dragonfly are restricted to springs in the same reserve and also threatened.

In February 2021, captive-bred fish were released into the wild spring, boosting the population from about 200 to approximately 3,000.

== Ecological role ==
It has been hypothetically posed that the red-finned blue-eye eats the seeds of an endangered species of the eriocaulon (pipewort), which is part of the plant's life cycle, and up to 11 species of endemic snail may potentially rely on this plant as a food source. Whether the fish actually acts in this way to help maintain the spring ecosystem is unknown but it is not worth the risk to lose the species in case it plays such an ecologically important role in the spring ecosystem.
