= Edgbastonia zeidlerorum =

Conservation status
- Endangered (IUCN 3.1)

Scientific classification
- Kingdom: Animalia
- Phylum: Mollusca
- Class: Gastropoda
- Subclass: Caenogastropoda
- Order: Littorinimorpha
- Family: Tateidae
- Genus: Edgbastonia
- Species: E. zeidlerorum

Binomial name
- Edgbastonia zeidlerorum (Ponder & Clark, 1990)

Synonyms
- Edgbastonia (Barcaldinia) zeidlerorum (Ponder & G. A. Clark, 1990)· accepted, alternate representation; Jardinella zeidlerorum Ponder & G. A. Clark, 1990 (basionym)

Species of gastropod

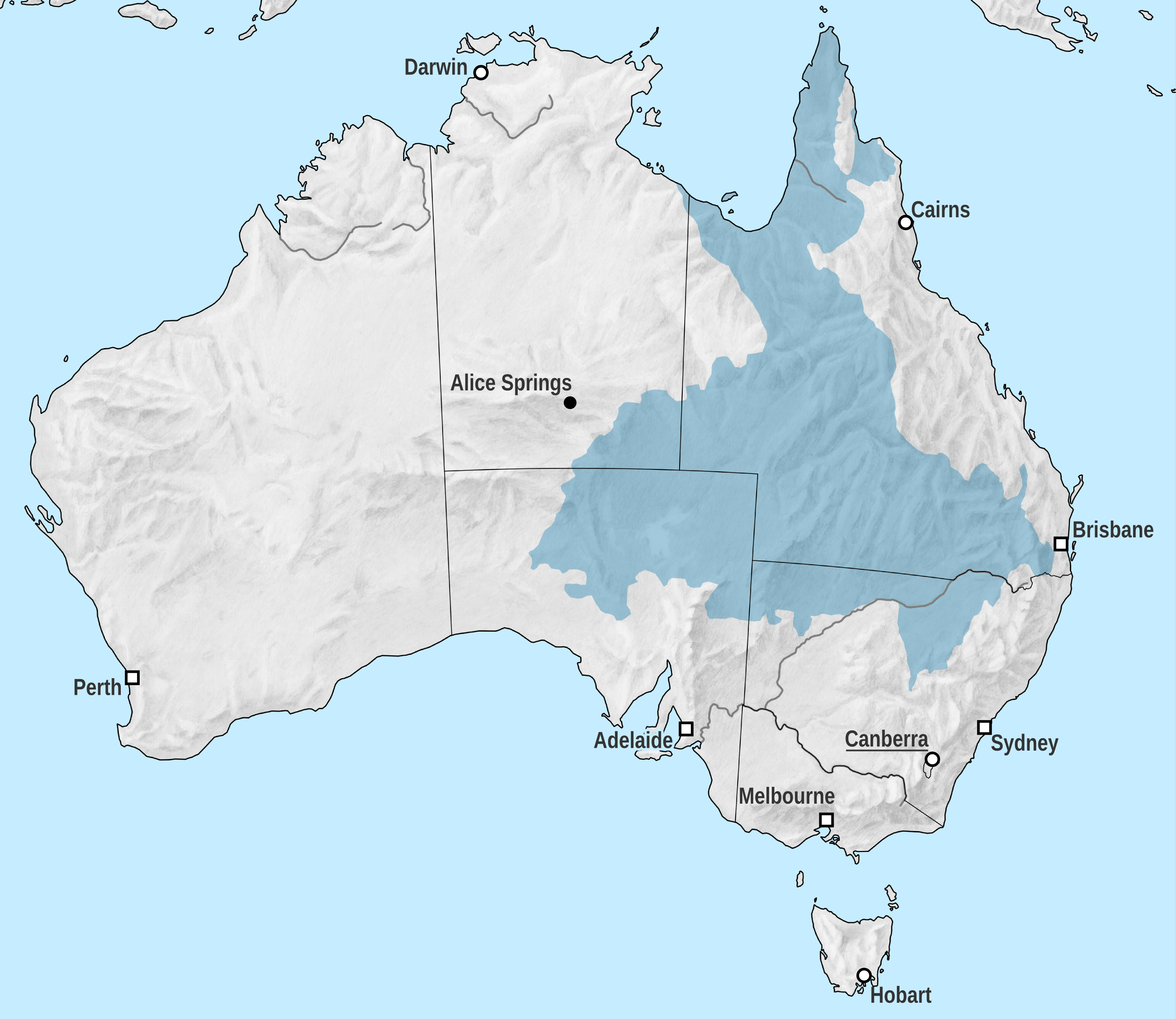

Edgbastonia Zeidlerorum is a miniature freshwater snail that inhabits the Edgbaston spring group in the Great Artesian Basin (GAB) in western Queensland, Australia. It is a species endemic to Australia. This species was named and classified by Ponder & Clark in 1990. As one of the unique species in the Hydrobiidae family, it is of great significance in the research of microenvironment adaptation, species isolation and the ecological evolution of springs. Due to its extremely limited habitat, Edgbastonia Zeidlerorum is also regarded as a highly sensitive ecological indicator species under climate change and human disturbances.

== Taxonomy and etymology ==
Edgbastonia Zeidlerorum belongs to the family Hydrobiidae under the subclass Prosobranchia, the superfamily Rissooidea, and in the family Tateidae. It is a tiny freshwater snail in the spring ecosystem of the GAB in Australia and is endemic to the country. It was discovered and collected by molluszoologists Winston Ponder and G. A. Clark in Edgbaston, western Queensland in 1984, and was officially named and its taxonomic description published in 1990. This species has been classified into the newly established genus Edgbastonia, aiming to separate it from the original genus Jardinella to reflect its unique morphological and ecological characteristics.

The species independence of Edgbastonia Zeidlerorum is mainly divided into three aspects. The first is that the microstructure of its shell is significantly different from that of other members of the Hydrobiidae family, especially reflected in the helical tightness, shell opening shape, and volume ratio.

Secondly, in terms of the reproductive system, it distinguishes itself from other species of this family. Its female reproductive system has highly specialized structures, such as significant bursa copulatrix and simplified ovaries, reflecting the long-term adaptability to a closed ecological environment .

Thirdly, the habitat of this species is highly dependent on environmental specificity. It only survives in specific spring systems and is extremely dependent on water quality, flow rate and substrate.

The above three factors jointly strengthen the independence and rationality of its classification.

== Anatomy ==
=== Shell ===
The shell of Edgbastonia Zeidlerorum is oval-shaped and conical, firm and semi-transparent, with a yellowish-brown colour. The length is usually 2.0-2.4mm, the width is usually 1.5-2.0mm, and it has approximately 3.9-4.5 helical layers. Compared with other members of the Hydrobiidae family, its size belongs to a smaller category.

The most notable feature of this species is that it has a distinct Colummellar tooth, which is relatively rare in the Hydrobiidae family. Columellar teeth are thought to be an adaptation to flowing water environments, allowing individuals to anchor more securely to substrates such as rocks, gravel, or aquatic vegetation in spring habitats. In addition, this species has fewer shell openings and a tight helix, which helps to reduce water loss and enhance its tolerance to changes in the microenvironment. Although there is no clear evidence at present indicating that this structure is directly related to predatory defense, the shell morphological characteristics may have played a certain protective role against environmental fluctuations during the evolution process.

=== Reproductive system ===
The reproductive system of Edgbastonia Zeidlerorum shows a relatively high degree of specialization, which is different from many other Hydrobiidae species. Its anatomical structure reflects, to a certain extent, the adaptation and evolutionary trends within its isolated ecosystem. The female reproductive system has a significant and unique mating sac (bursa copulatrix), which may affect sperm storage and fertilization methods. Additionally, its ovaries are located close to the dorsal side of the body cavity and have a simple developmental structure, which is conducive to energy-saving reproduction in spring water with limited resources. The emergence of these characteristics is speculated to be related to the reproductive strategy of this species that has long resided in isolated spring ecosystems.

Certain studies have speculated that due to the closed spring environment of this species, the flow of genes among individuals is restricted, and its reproductive mode may lean towards self-pollination or low-diversity reproduction to maintain population stability. Although specific data on the self-pollination rate of Edgbastonia Zeidlerorum are currently lacking, judging from the simplification trend of its reproductive structure, its reproductive strategy may tend towards low diversity or clonal reproduction to maintain the survival of smaller populations. Furthermore, when the water level drops periodically, this species may enter a brief period of physiological stagnation, waiting for more suitable hydrological conditions, thereby delaying reproductive activities.

=== Ecological adaptations ===
Edgbastonia Zeidlerorum is an aquatic species with relatively large gill sacs, well-developed lower gill glands and rather long tentacles, which are believed to be used to enhance the perception of water flow and microenvironment. The above characteristics indicate that it is an aquatic species. At the same time, aquatic snail species cannot tolerate dryness for more than a few minutes and rely on a continuously available suitable aquatic habitat. Certain of the physiological structures demonstrated by Edgbastonia Zeidlerorum may enhance its survival rate in the early stage of spring drying up. For instance, the thickness of the shell and the well-developed adductor muscles can reduce water loss and enable it to survive briefly in a humid environment. It has been hypothesised that Edgbastonia zeidlerorum may exhibit limited amphibious tolerance, enabling it to persist temporarily during minor water recessions by seeking refuge in damp microhabitats such as rock fissures or wet sediment. Although this special shell structure cannot fully support terrestrial behaviour, it is sufficient to cope with the common minor hydrological fluctuations in GAB springs, reflecting its adaptability to extreme ecological microenvironments.

== Ecology ==
=== Distribution ===
Edgbastonia Zeidlerorum mainly inhabits the Edgbaston spring Group in western Queensland, Australia. This group of springs is part of the GAB spring ecosystem. These springs are naturally gushed out by groundwater through geological structural zones, forming independent and highly ecologically specific wetland systems. GAB is regarded as the world's largest groundwater basin, covering approximately 1.7 million square kilometers. The water source of the Great Artesian Basin comes from precipitation millions of years ago. The underground aquifer formed by the long-term infiltration and accumulation of precipitation overflows to the surface through geological fractures, such as faults or stratigraphic boundaries.

=== Habitat and environmental dependence ===
There are a large number of springs in the Edgbaston area. Some of the springs form small water bodies that are encouraged to be distributed due to the differences in terrain. These micro-ecosystems have hydrological characteristics such as high mineral content, low flow rate and slightly alkaline nature. The above-mentioned hydrological characteristics are highly consistent with the living environment of Edgbastonia Zeidlerorum, which evolved and persisted precisely in this highly stable and unique environment.

Furthermore, since the spring system of GAB is not a homogeneous environment, there are significant differences in temperature, salinity, substrate, and vegetation types among different springs, which leads to extremely high local specificity and irreplaceability in the spring biological community. For example, some springs flow through limestone areas with a relatively high concentration of calcium ions in the water, while others seep out of the landmarks from sandstone structures and have relatively soft water quality. These subtle differences will all affect the substrate type and micro-ecological environment on which Edgbastonia Zeidlerorum depends.

=== Hydrological conditions ===
The active springs in the Edgbaston spring group usually maintain water flow throughout the year, although the flow rate is relatively low, it is extremely stable. Stable water flow and its velocity are crucial for the survival of micro-aquatic species such as Edgbastonia zeidlerorum, as they are extremely sensitive to changes in their habitat environment. Studies have pointed out that minor changes in water flow rate may affect the structure of their habitat substrate and thereby impact their survival. The depth of the spring water is relatively shallow. The average water depth is usually less than 13.8 (±3.0) mm, and the water depth of some springs can be as low as 1.4 (±0.8) mm. Certain springs do not have obvious ponds but are dominated by wetland vegetation, with slow water flow and uneven distribution. These shallow environments provide a mild and oxygen-rich ecological environment for Edgbastonia zeidlerorum. However, shallow water usually also means that the water body is extremely vulnerable to evaporation, changes in water sources, or disturbances from landmarks. Some of the springs lack the traditional "pond" structure and are instead covered by wetland plants such as reeds and aquatic moss, forming a complex micro-environment with slow seepage. This structural skill provides shelter and also helps the species maintain a relatively stable ecological environment.

=== Local endemism and evolutionary isolation ===
Members of the Hydrobiidae family are widely distributed across all continents except Antarctica. However, in Australia, due to its relatively independent geographical features in the world and its significant diversity and locality characteristics in GAB-related spring systems, as well as its extreme isolation, it shows a highly localized radiation evolution trend. Scientists believe that each spring may carry a unique evolutionary lineage and even have the potential to become a new species. As a result, the Edgbaston Spring Group is not only one of the hotspots for species diversity, but also has high ecological conservation value. Studies show that the diversity of Australian spring mollusks is limited by their weak diffusion ability, low reproduction rate and strong dependence on specific microenvironments. This leads to more limited suitable habitat areas for these animals, multiple restrictions on biodiversity, and high sensitivity to environmental changes. As a unique miniature freshwater mollusk of Australia, and an important member of the inland spring biological community and the Hydrobiidae family, Edgbastonia zeidlerorum is of great representative significance in the research of ecology and biogeography.

This species not only demonstrates an extremely distinctive evolutionary path in the spring ecosystem, but also reflects the adaptation strategies of micro-mollusks in isolated environments. The changes in mollusk diversity reflect the environmental changes caused by humans. Because its biological community often shows poor diffusion ability, and in some cases, even building a small farm dam may lead to the extinction of a species. This phenomenon further highlights the vulnerability of spring endemic species and the importance of protecting them.

== Status ==
=== Legal and policy protections ===
According to the Environment Protection and Biodiversity Conservation Act 1999 (abbreviated as EPBC Act), water resources are specially protected, especially for development projects that may have a significant impact on water resources. This provides an important legal basis for Edgbastonia zeidlerorum and its ecosystem. This law clearly stipulates that all projects that may have a significant impact on water resources, including special provisions for unconventional gas development and large coal mining development.

According to Article 24D, anything that may have a significant impact on water resources must obtain the approval of the Minister for the Environment. The development project requires an environmental impact assessment to determine whether it will have a significant impact on groundwater or other related water resources. This part of the law aims to reduce the damage caused by the mining and energy industries to groundwater systems (such as GAB) and wetland ecosystems. It is applicable to important environmental areas including the habitats of threatened species, wetland ecological communities and groundwater dependent ecosystems (GDEs), which helps to stabilize the groundwater system and artificially control risks to ensure the ecological integrity of these areas. Thereby indirectly protecting specific species such as Edgbastonia Zeidlerorum that rely on springs for survival.

=== Threats ===
Edgbastonia Zeidlerorum mainly inhabits the Edgbaston spring Group, in western Queensland. Its habitat range is extremely narrow and lacks the ability to naturally spread or expand the habitat of the species. Spring endemic species usually have a high degree of habitat dependence, and it is difficult for assisted migration to expand their living area. Edgbastonia zeidlerorum is not easily adapted to other water bodies or ecological conditions because it is highly dependent on specific water quality, flow rate, and the bottom conditions of the spring. Therefore, even minor disturbances, such as artificial water flow guidance or surface engineering, may lead to severe destruction of the habitat and subsequently trigger local extinction. The spring ecosystem is a biodiversity hotspot, which is regarded as an "oasis in the desert". It not only provides shelters for a variety of rare and endangered aquatic invertebrates, but also is an ideal model for studying the impact of climate change and human activities. However, these springs are usually small in area and isolated, and many of them are closed or semi-closed systems. Their water sources come from groundwater accumulated thousands of years ago. The renewal rate is extremely slow, and the self-recovery ability of the ecosystem is weak. Once damaged, the recovery time may take decades or even hundreds of years. Therefore, the survival of Edgbastonia Zeidlerorum not only depends on the stability of hydrological conditions, but is also restricted by the integrity of the microhabitat carried by its community.

What is more serious is that the GAB spring ecosystem has long been confronted with multiple threats from human activities, including pumping, grazing and the invasion of alien species. Some scientists concern that many endemic species of springs, including Edgbastonia Zeidlerorum, may become extremely endangered or even extinct species, and even face the risk of extinction in the coming decades, especially in the case of frequent extreme climate events. The actual situation may be more severe than the expected result.

Additionally, due to the extremely limited range of the habitat, the relatively small species populations in the spring wetland are considered particularly vulnerable to extinction (i.e., partial extinction). Edgbastonia Zeidlerorum has been officially assessed as endangered (EN) in the IUCN Red List, but systematic, ecological and biological studies are urgently needed to promote the conservation of freshwater mollusks in Australia. Furthermore, within Australia, there are a large number of species groups that have not been evaluated but have similar ecological sensitivity, but have not been included in the protection category in a timely manner due to the lack of systematic research. The current conservation system still relies heavily on national-level policies. It is also necessary to strengthen the ecological and systematic investigations of these spring endemic species to avoid losing conservation opportunities before the species is fully understood.

==== Groundwater extraction ====
The Edgbaston spring relies on GAB for water supply. Meanwhile, agriculture, industry and urban water use in the Queensland region also rely heavily on GAB groundwater, especially for farmland irrigation. By 1963, GAB had approximately 18,000 boreholes, and the emissions brought by these boreholes significantly reduced the pressure of artwine Wells. Furthermore, sometimes water is pumped out for mining, causing the water level of the hill spring to drop, threatening the water level of the hill spring, with the water level dropping by up to 120 meters.

The groundwater resources of GAB are facing severe depletion. Data shows that some springs recorded in 1980 had disappeared by the time of re-exploration in 1984, and 40% of the drainage spring groups had completely ceased activities. This is due to the sharp decline in the flow of the spring caused by the drop in groundwater pressure, which eventually stops flowing. The decline and extinction of springs will inevitably lead to the disappearance of local endemic species. Considering E. zeidlerorum's extreme dependence on specific springs, the stability of its population is directly affected by the hydrological pressure of GAB.

==== Livestock and Wildlife Disturbance ====
Spring wetlands usually lack protective barriers and excessive animal husbandry by herders and wild animals have caused damage to the springs. Such as trampling by livestock, water pollution caused by animal excrement, and the impact of vegetation destruction. The high-frequency activities of domestic animals such as cattle and sheep around the spring, such as trampling behaviors, may cause significant disturbances to the edges of the spring wetland, especially in small spring wetlands. This kind of interference will have a profound impact on the unique aquatic invertebrates in the spring water, especially snails.

In addition, wild animals such as wild boars also continuously pose a danger to the wetland environment. Although the management made preparations to drive away wild boars, 20% of the spring water was still severely disturbed by pigs and cattle.

And since the 19th century, the drilling activities carried out for animal husbandry have further exacerbated the sudden drop in groundwater pressure, greatly damaging the spring water level of GAB.

=== Current conservation efforts ===
To mitigate the aforementioned threats, the Australian government and environmental protection organizations have been promoting ecological restoration and protection measures at multiple levels.

==== Ecological Restoration Programs ====
The Edgbaston Reserve has implemented a livestock control policy. In any individual wetland area, at any time, the area damaged by livestock or wild animals shall not exceed 10%, and it is recommended to set up preventive measures in all areas where wild boars are present to control wild boars. And confirm that there are no or controllable alien aquatic organisms and plants in the wetland.

==== Restore the water flow ====
Government-funded projects, such as the "Great Artesian Basin Sustainability Initiative" (GABSI), have restored the hydraulic systems of multiple springs by blocking boreholes and encouraging more efficient use of water resources in some areas. The discharge of GAB groundwater has been effectively reduced.

==== Long-term monitoring plan ====
States are also actively taking measures and actions to effectively monitor the flow of springs. For example, South Australia plans to construct groundwater models to predict the impact of groundwater reduction, and Queensland plans to infer the impact through standard hydrological equations. Comprehensive considerations must be made when allowing new groundwater allocations, and preventive measures must be taken to protect spring wetlands from being affected.

==== Strengthen education and encourage landowners to actively participate in the management of springs ====
Develop educational and explanatory materials, select certain spring areas for tourists to visit, and ensure that tourism does not impose a burden on the springs and does not affect ecological integrity. And educate landowners to be aware of the importance of springs and increase their awareness and responsibility for spring management. Strengthen the cooperation between universities, research institutions, etc. and indigenous communities, incorporate local ecological knowledge into protection plans, and construct a more inclusive and sustainable governance system.

== See also ==
- List of non-marine molluscs of Australia
