= Edgbastonia alanwillsi =

Scientific classification
- Kingdom: Animalia
- Phylum: Mollusca
- Class: Gastropoda
- Subclass: Caenogastropoda
- Order: Littorinimorpha
- Family: Tateidae
- Genus: Edgbastonia
- Species: E. alanwillsi

Binomial name
- Edgbastonia alanwillsi Ponder, Wilke, Zhang, Golding, Fukuda & Mason, 2008

Species of gastropod

Edgbastonia alanwillsi is a species of small freshwater snail with an operculum, an aquatic gastropod mollusc or micromollusc in the family Tateidae.

Edgbastoni alanwillsi is endemic to western Queensland, Australia. It is only found in a small group of springs in the Edgbaston Reserve near Aramac, where it is assumed to be relictual.

== See also ==
- List of non-marine molluscs of Australia
