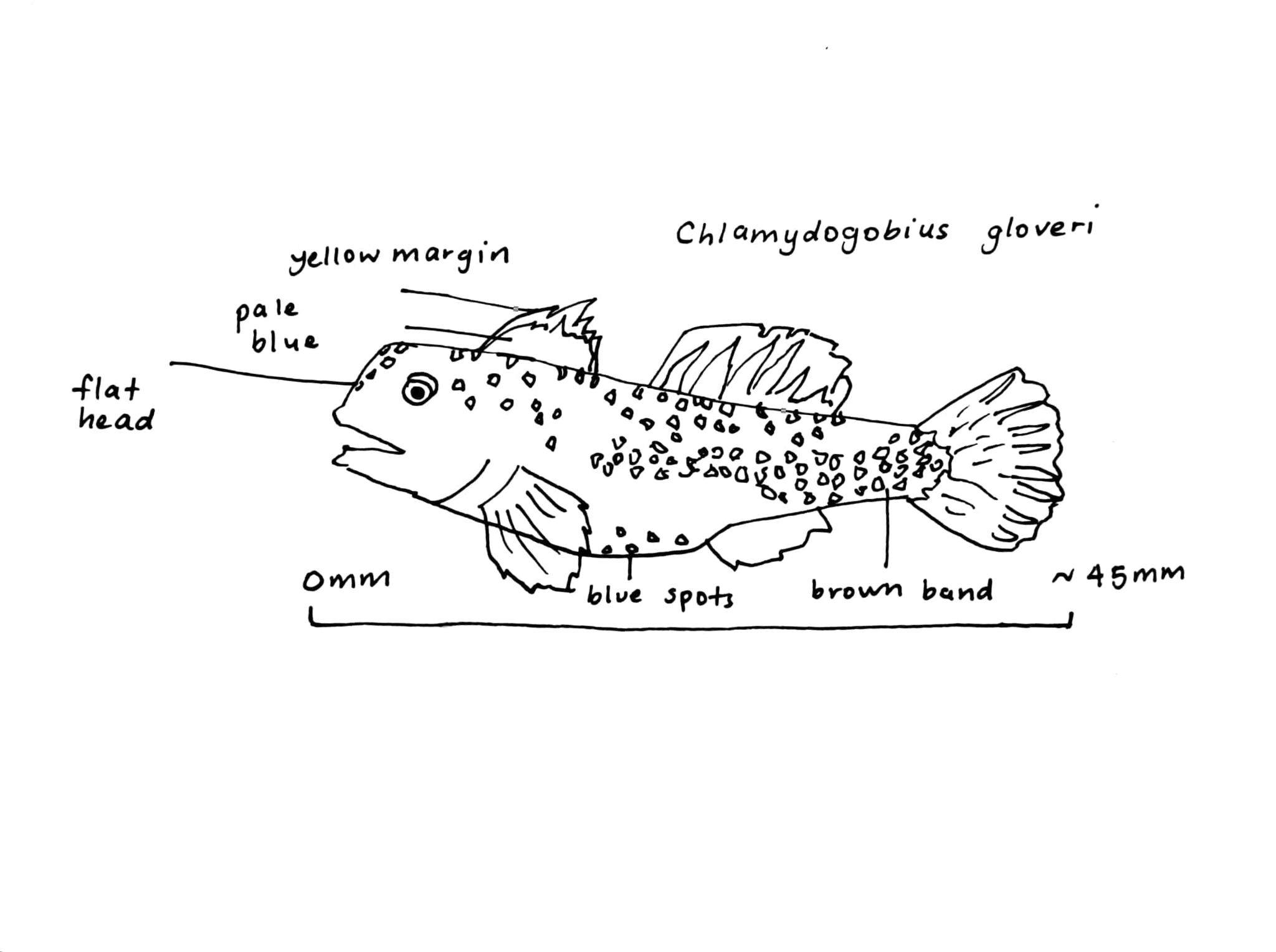

Conservation status
- Critically Endangered (IUCN 3.1)

Scientific classification
- Kingdom: Animalia
- Phylum: Chordata
- Class: Actinopterygii
- Order: Gobiiformes
- Family: Oxudercidae
- Genus: Chlamydogobius
- Species: C. gloveri

Binomial name
- Chlamydogobius gloveri Larson, 1995

= Dalhousie goby =

Species of fish

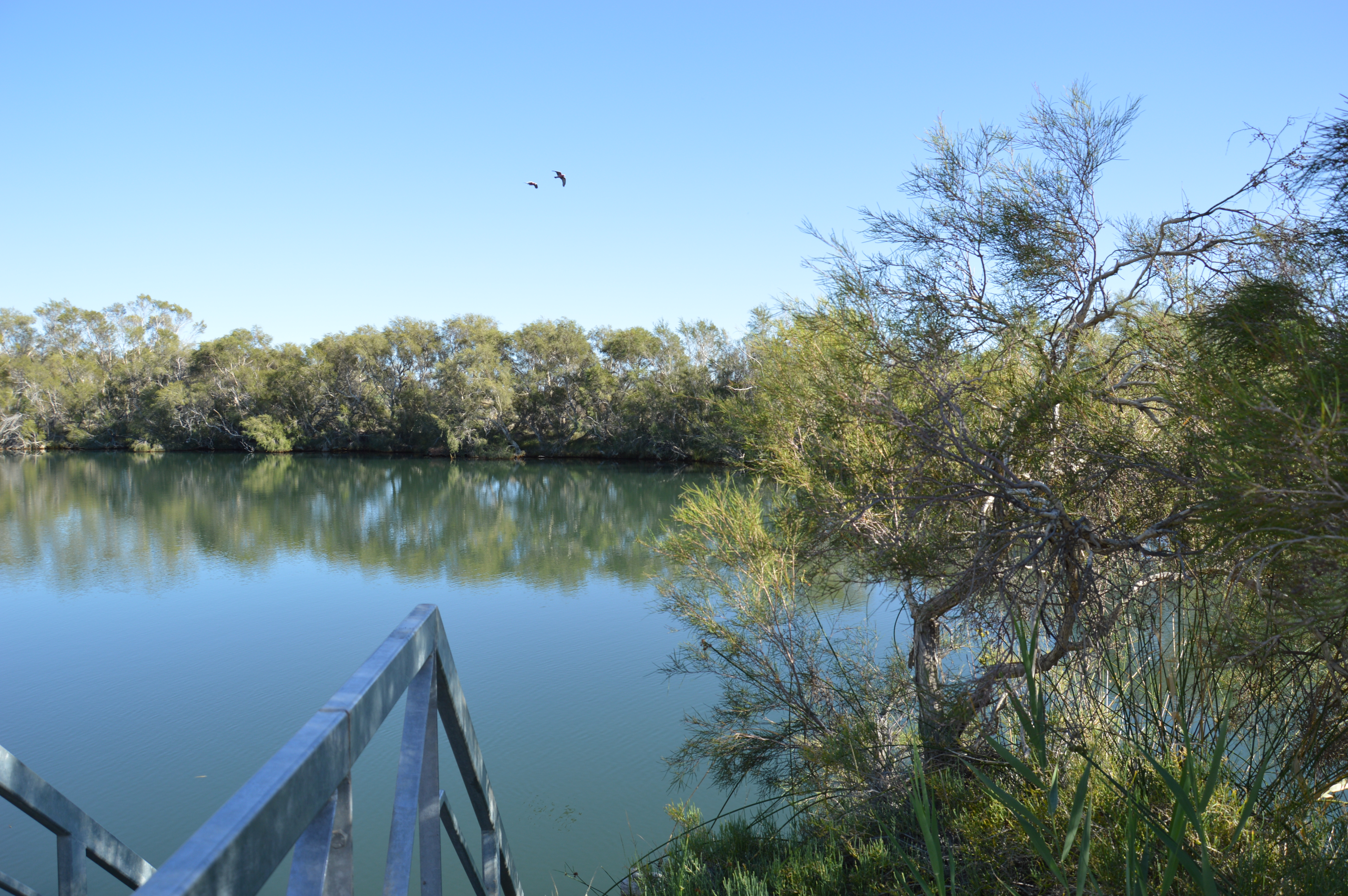
Dalhousie Springs in Witjira National Park

The Dalhousie goby (Chlamydogobius gloveri) is a species of goby endemic to Australia where it lives in the Dalhousie Springs. This species can reach a standard length of 4.5 centimetres (1.8 in). It feeds on small molluscs, crustaceans and other odds and ends like most other gobies.

== Etymology ==
The scientific name "Chlamydogobius gloveri" is derived from the Greek word "chlamys" meaning cloak, whilst the word "gobius" is defined as gudgeon in Latin.

The second half of the species is named "gloveri" in honour of the late John Glover, a former Curator of Fishes at the South Australian Museum, who worked extensively on desert gobies and other taxa of fishes found in the deserts of Australia. Glover was sure that this goby was a distinct species from Chlamydogobius eremius but he did not describe it.

The species was documented throughout the 1980s and Charles Glover specifically wrote about the fish in 1989. Prominent Australian ichthyologist, Helen K Larson, also documented this species in 1995.

== Location and Distribution ==
The Dalhousie Goby is endemic to the Dalhousie Springs, located in Witjira National Park in South Australia. It is the smallest of the five species that are endemic to the Dalhousie Springs. Because the Springs are an enclosed system covering approximately 200 square meters, the development of the fish is unique and has largely been undisturbed by other non native fish species.

Although the Dalhousie Spring Complex has approximately 148 isolated springs, they are all fed by one common freshwater source: the Great Artesian Basin.

Out of these 148 springs, the Dalhousie Goby can be found in approximately 28 of them. These fish favour temperatures from 21.6 degrees celsius to 36 degrees celsius.

The fish prefers shallow water and swamps where phragmites (a type of reed grass) and other vegetation are prolific.

Academics have researched the liveability of the Springs, examining some key variables: the first was a correlation between the density of fish species and environmental variables (which consisted of temperature of the water body, presence of vegetation, size of the water body etc). A second investigation focused on whether there was a correlation between some environmental variables and the presence or absence of specific fish species.

It was found that the larger the spring, the more species were found, including the Dalhousie Goby. The results also found that the Dalhousie goby had a very regular and "deterministic" fish structure and that above a certain spring size, the goby would almost always be present. Thus, the numbers and distribution of the fish depends on individual characteristics such as body size, feeding habits and tolerances. For the goby, being a small fish that does not require a specific diet, it could live in shallow and densely vegetated areas. In comparison, the perch, could not survive in the same environment as the goby, requiring a habitat that was more conducive to its predatory lifestyle. According to this study, the goby was present in most of the tested springs except for one spring where the vegetation had died off (labelled E3).

Based on their distribution, scientists found that Dalhousie Gobies exhibit great tolerance to varying conditions including salinity and temperature.

== Description ==
The Dalhousie Goby is a fish that has several distinct physical features. Generally, the fish has a light grey, almost silver sheen. In comparison to other desert gobies, their colouring is more muted.

Only reaching the length of approximately 4.5 cm to 6 cm, it is a small fish that has approximately two dorsal fins, fifteen vertebrae and fifteen caudal fin rays.

The eyes of the Dalhousie Goby are high on its broad and flat head. Many sources distinguish the appearance of male gobies from female gobies, citing that the teeth in the male gobies appear larger and that the colour of female gobies are paler. Female gobies also have blue spots located in the center of their primary fins, whilst male gobies have a light blue stripe running through the centre of the primary dorsal fin, which is outlined by a pale yellow fringe. The colour of the Dalhousie Goby's pelvic fins vary from a translucent white to a translucent brown, with males generally possessing darker fins than their female counterparts.

Dalhousie Gobies has been described as "poor swimmers". They also have a pharyngeal organ, used as a pathway for oxygen, which they use for respiration. This organ also allows them to extract oxygen from the atmosphere around them.

These fish are diurnal and pose no threat to humans.

== Breeding and Diet ==
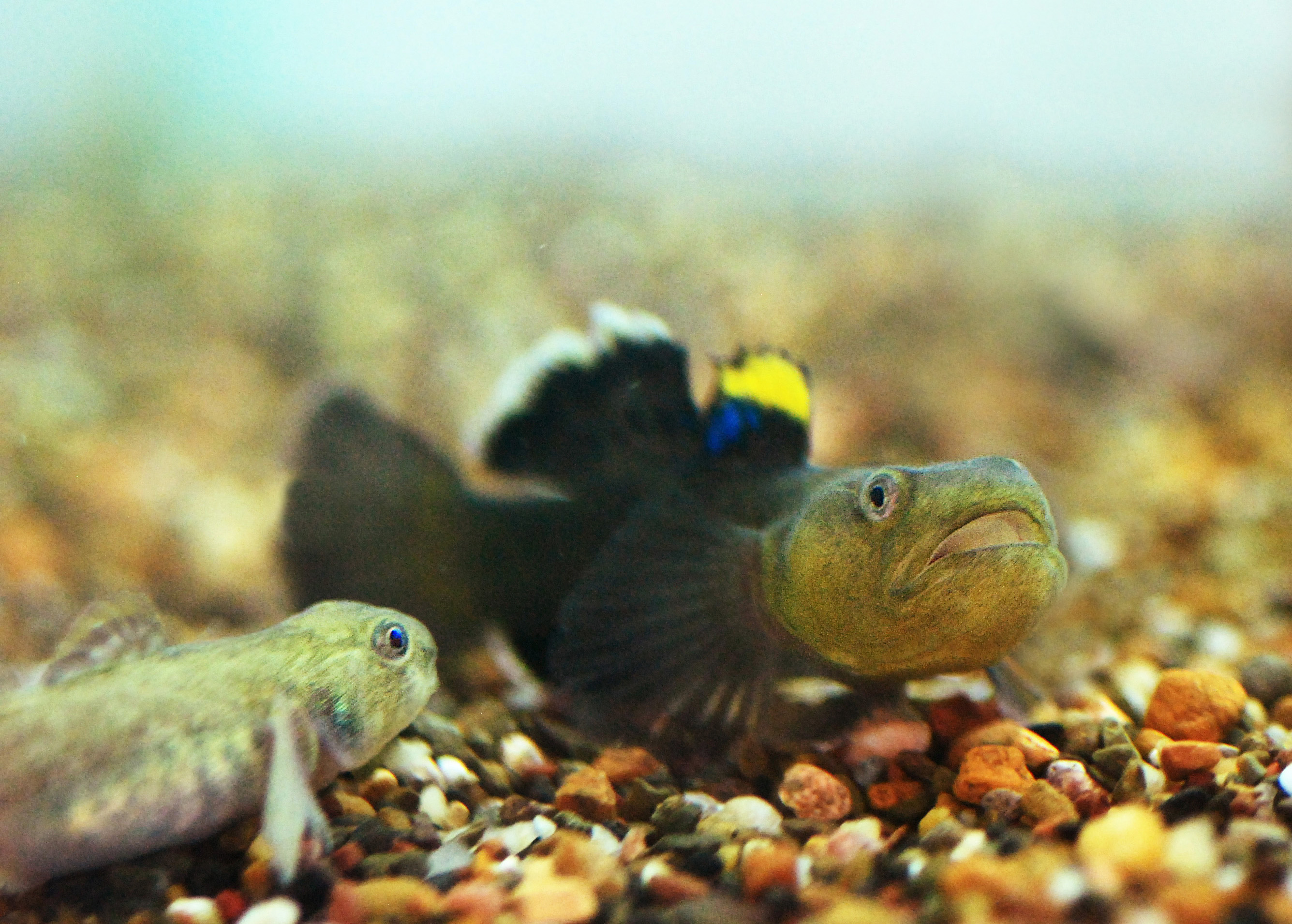
Chlamydogobius eremius, otherwise known as the Desert Goby, bears similar breeding and diet patterns to the Dalhousie Goby

Many leading marine biologists note that without extensive study of the Dalhousie Goby, much information has been interpolated from other desert goby species.

The Dalhousie Gobies are benthic spawners that lay eggs rather than give birth to live young. They utilise rock cavities to lay their adhesive eggs, which attaches itself to the rocks. Once the eggs are deposited, the male goby acts as a guard and will fan the eggs with their fins almost constantly until they hatch so as to increase ventilation for the eggs. The number of eggs deposited has been estimated through a comparison with the breeding habits of the Chlamydogobius eremius, a species of goby that lays approximately 150 to 300 eggs. The Chlamydogobius eremius has also acted as a guide for scientists to determine the time it takes for eggs to hatch. Scientists suggest that it takes approximately ten days for Dalhousie Goby eggs to hatch. Their breeding season occurs during the Australian summer months. The generation length of the Dalhousie Goby is half a year.

Like other goby species, the Dalhousie Goby are an omnivorous species. The majority of their diet consists of thread-like algae. Based on the known feeding habits of other gobies, the Dalhousie Goby are likely bottom feeders, feeding on smaller crustaceans and insects. There have also been instances of cannibalism among this species, with adults preying on younger fish.

== Conservation status and threats ==
In 1999, the Dalhousie Goby was listed as a vulnerable species. Once assessed again in 2019 by the IUCN Red List of Threatened Species, its status was changed to critically endangered.

As of July 2024, it is listed as critically endangered under the EBPC Act.

Threats to the species include boring in their habitat, human activity, landscape disturbance through excavation, foreign flora and fauna invasion, livestock disturbance and tourism. The Dalhousie Goby is considered critically endangered due to the impacts of these threats but also because they can only be found in the Springs.

=== Boring and spring excavation ===
Boring causes issues for this species because it reduces the availability of surface water by varying the amount of vegetation and water present. Since the 19th century, the landscape of the Great Artesian Basin has been altered through boring by pastoralists, leading to a decline in spring flows. By creating inactive or reduced spring flows, the amount of fish present in the springs declines and events of local extinction can occur. With reduced living space, endemic species have become more concentrated in some springs than others and their overall number has dropped. Many pastoral bores are still operative and it is difficult to cap them as there are legal and administrative barriers to their stoppage, such as seeking permission from current land owners.

Spring excavation is another form of interference that poses a threat to the Goby as it affects the natural composition values in the Springs. Spring excavation was initially performed due to the incorrect assumption that it would facilitate stronger flows and assist stock accessing water.

=== Invasion of foreign flora and fauna ===
Foreign flora and fauna pose risks create increased competition for food and resources and may prey on the goby. There have been instances of foreign fauna such as the Eastern Gambusia fish in the Springs, which have most likely been brought over by humans from approximately 100 km away. These fish are considered aquatic pests and have been occupying the artificial habitats created by boring.

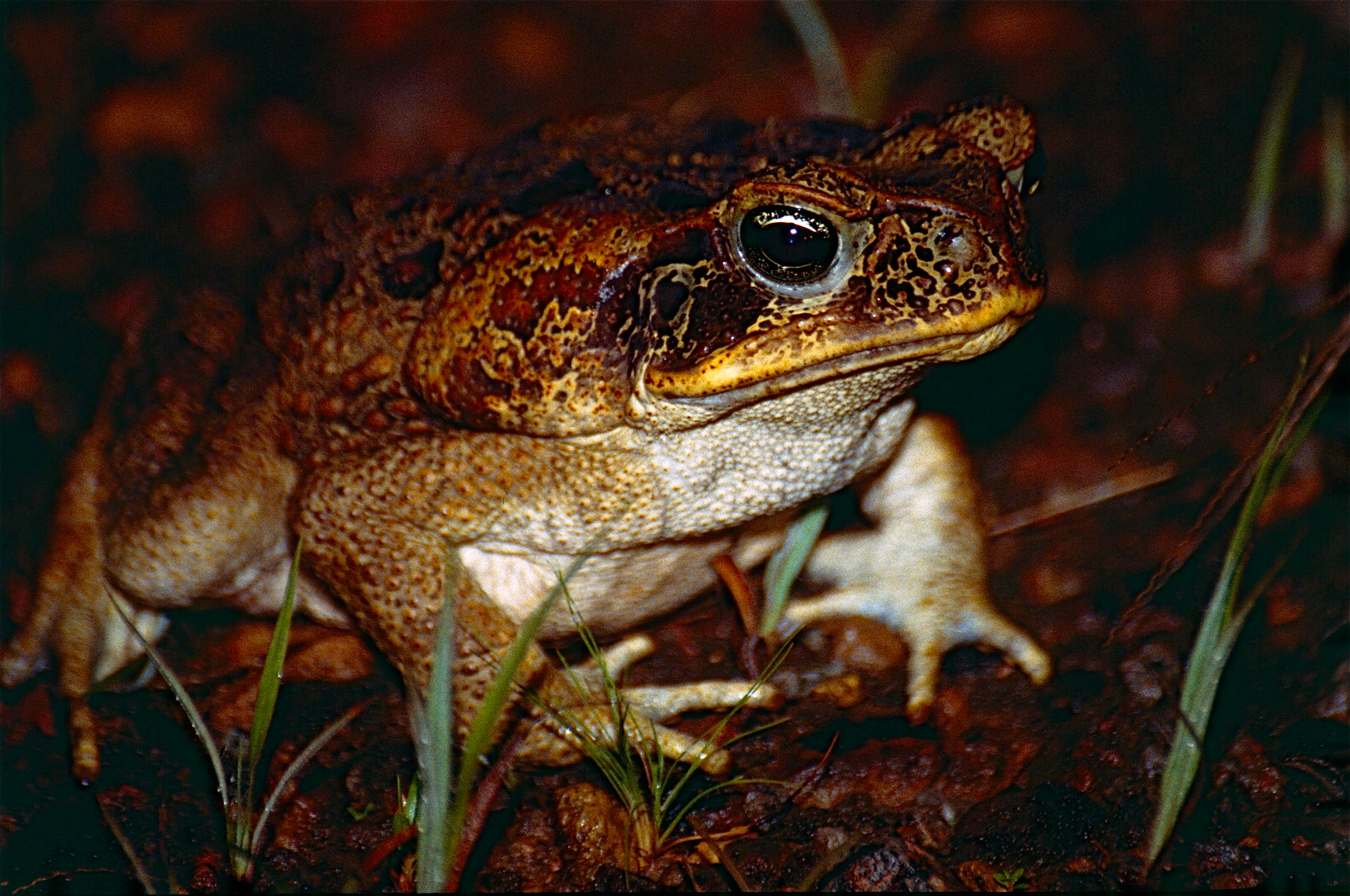
The Cane Toad, a foreign and invasive species in the Springs

Cane toads are also dangerous as they prey on invertebrates. They have already been documented examples of cane toads found in the eastern portion of the Great Artesian Basin. Further, according to the Government of South Australia, there is a risk of crayfish being deliberately introduced into the springs, which could also lead to competition and predation for the vulnerable Dalhousie Goby.

Exotic plants are also risky to the survival of the Dalhousie Goby. Pastoralists introduced the date palm in the late 19th century, which has since infested specific areas of the Dalhousie Springs. Because these date palms possess extensive root systems and undergo an intensive transpiration process, this reduces the level of surface water. The reduction of surface water level leads to events of local extinction and reduced goby populations as living space is lost.

Other recorded exotic flora that pose a risk are grasses, bamboo and athol pine. The bamboo and athol pine have also spread across Springs in South Australia and have the potential to spread to the Dalhousie Springs, affecting the food available to the gobies. Grasses can also create risks because they affect the natural composition within the Springs. These grasses are most likely spread by birds from neighboring wetlands.

=== Human and livestock disturbance ===
Humans have been interacting with the Springs for approximately 40,000 years. However, these interactions were fairly harmonious and practices that promoted regeneration such as cultural burning were used. Cultural burning was beneficial to the Goby as it helped maintain their open water habitats.When the Europeans arrived approximately 200 years ago, cultural burning ceased.

Furthermore, the recent high tourism numbers affects the Goby through environmental degradation. Whilst the government adequately controls tourism through the placing of signage and restrictive barriers, there still needs to be continual management to offset any potential damage. Possible damage caused by tourism includes damage to the environment through trampling and unauthorised bathing wherein products such as sunscreen and detergents pollute the water systems.

Livestock disturbance (mainly donkeys, cattle and camels) through grazing and trampling, is another issue because it degrades the natural mineral composition in the Springs. Their trampling has cause substrates to become more muddy and weakens their foundation, which degrades the mineral composition in the water. This can affect animals in the Springs who are more sensitive to water quality, although the Goby is a fish with wide ranging tolerances.

Livestock disturbance has resulted in a slow change in the ecology of the Springs, from a more native species dominated environment to an environment now dominated by more tolerant species that are able to effectively deal with the harsher habitat.

== Conservation efforts ==
There have been several conservation efforts orchestrated by the National Parks co-managers, the South Australian government and the Witjira National Park Board.

The South Australian Government has published their recommendations for the conservation of the Springs. These recommendations include increased efforts to cap and control bores to maintain the level of flows from the springs.

For the issue of livestock disturbance, the South Australian government recommended adequate fencing to ensure that grazing occurs in appropriate places. However, in this initiative, fencing would work to regulate stock, rather than remove them completely as this would encourage the growth of foreign flora at the expense of native flora.

The South Australian Government aims to control the threat posed by foreign flora and fauna. Methods such as shooting, baiting and trapping feral animals, especially feral pigs, are encouraged. Further, the South Australian Government encourages the prevention and removal of exotic fauna and flora such as the Eastern Gambusia fish and the date palm, accompanied with rigorous monitoring programs. In recent years, cultural burning has been reintroduced successfully in select springs where it has been effective in curbing the growth of foreign flora such as the date palm.

The recommendations also include increasing awareness about the risk of accidentally transporting organisms from one spring to another, which primarily occurs due to unsanitised footwear. Visitors to the sites should be made to clean their footwear to minimise these risks lest it damage the habitat. The damage associated with tourism has been mitigated by regulation which now prohibits activities such as fishing and boating, as well as pollutants such as chemicals. Swimming is now restricted to only one pool in the Springs, minimising the risk of spring damage.

Conservation efforts have been focused at accurately measuring the populations of endemic species and their distribution through the creation of an inventory. To further increase numbers, the South Australian Government also encourages more research into the habits, biology and ecology of the species itself, to create a habitat for the species to thrive.
