= Dalhousie Hilltop School, Dalhousie =

Dalhousie Hilltop School

Location
- Upper Bakrota, Dalhousie, Himachal Pradesh, India 176304; 32.536°N 75.997°E

Information
- Type: Private Boarding School
- Motto: Inspiring minds. Instilling values.
- Established: 1979
- President: Ms. Poonam Dhawan
- Grades: KinderGarten to XII (Science, Arts & Commerce)
- Colors: Orange and Green
- Affiliations: Central Board of Secondary Education
- Website: http://www.dalhousiehilltop.com/

Dalhousie Hilltop School (DHS) is a CBSE affiliated co-educational residential school serving Kindergarten to 12 located in the Upper Bakrota Hills of Dalhousie, Himachal Pradesh, India. The school was established in 1979 by Shri Inder Mohan Dhawan, who dedicated his entire retired life to children and the cause of education.

The school is located in the Himalayan Mountains at an altitude of 7600 feet in the town of Dalhousie, India. The Himachal Pradesh Region that surrounds the campus is a destination for travelers and tourists across the globe. The 12-acre campus is located among apple orchards, pine and deodar trees. The natural environment of the area is highlighted in the mountains, trails, streams, and step-farms, which can be seen from locations all over the campus.

Dalhousie Hilltop School is managed by the president, Mrs. Poonam Dhawan, who returned after spending three decades in the United States of America, having a track record of global corporates as well as in the field of education. The school has hostels, sports grounds, computer labs, and a gym. There are separate hostels for sub junior, junior and senior students. The cafeteria "RED APPLE" is a landmark on the way to Khajjiar from Dalhousie.

The school offers a number of sports and clubs focusing on public speaking, theatre, environment, trekking, dance, music, and photography. The school also organizes and participates in several international, national inter school competitions and events. The school has a number of programmes designed for the "Smart Child" of "Smart India".

== History ==
Shri. Inder Mohan Dhawan dedicated his entire retired life to children and to the cause of education. He started the school in 1979. The campus that homes Dalhousie Hilltop School, is an ancestral property, an ideal place Mr. Dhawan felt, to start an educational haven for children. Having essayed many roles in several positions in India and abroad, Mr. Dhawan committed himself to the cause of building leaders, one child at a time.

== Affiliation ==
Dalhousie Hilltop School is affiliated with the Central Board of Secondary Education (CBSE), which is the largest educational board in the country and is recognized by the Department of Education, Government of India, all the State Government Education Departments and universities across the country.

The school has also partnered with University of Cambridge UK, English programme, and has global exchange programmes with international schools and universities in the United Kingdom, Canada and the United States.

== Awards ==
- 2011 National Award winner, awarded by the Independent Schools Federation of India at its 13th National Conference. The award was presented by Mr. Vineet Joshi, Chairman C.B.S.E. New Delhi.
