= Edgbastonia corrugata =

Conservation status
- Vulnerable (IUCN 2.3)

Scientific classification
- Kingdom: Animalia
- Phylum: Mollusca
- Class: Gastropoda
- Subclass: Caenogastropoda
- Order: Littorinimorpha
- Family: Tateidae
- Genus: Edgbastonia
- Species: E. corrugata

Binomial name
- Edgbastonia corrugata (Ponder & Clark, 1990)

Species of gastropod

Edgbastonia corrugata is a species of small freshwater snails which have an operculum. They are aquatic gastropod mollusks in the family Tateidae.

Subspecies

- Edgbastonia corrugata corrugata (Ponder & G. A. Clark, 1990)
- Edgbastonia corrugata umbilicata Ponder, W.-H. Zhang, Hallan & Shea, 2019

This species is endemic to Australia.

== See also ==
- List of non-marine molluscs of Australia
