= Dalhousie Road, Nova Scotia =

Community in Nova Scotia, Canada

Coordinates: 44°43′21.54″N 64°41′30.14″W

Dalhousie Road in Nova Scotia

Dalhousie Road is a community in the Canadian province of Nova Scotia, located in Kings County. It is named after George Ramsay, 9th Earl of Dalhousie.
