= Dalhousie Station, Quebec =

Coordinates: 45°18′2.5″N 74°27′28.7″W

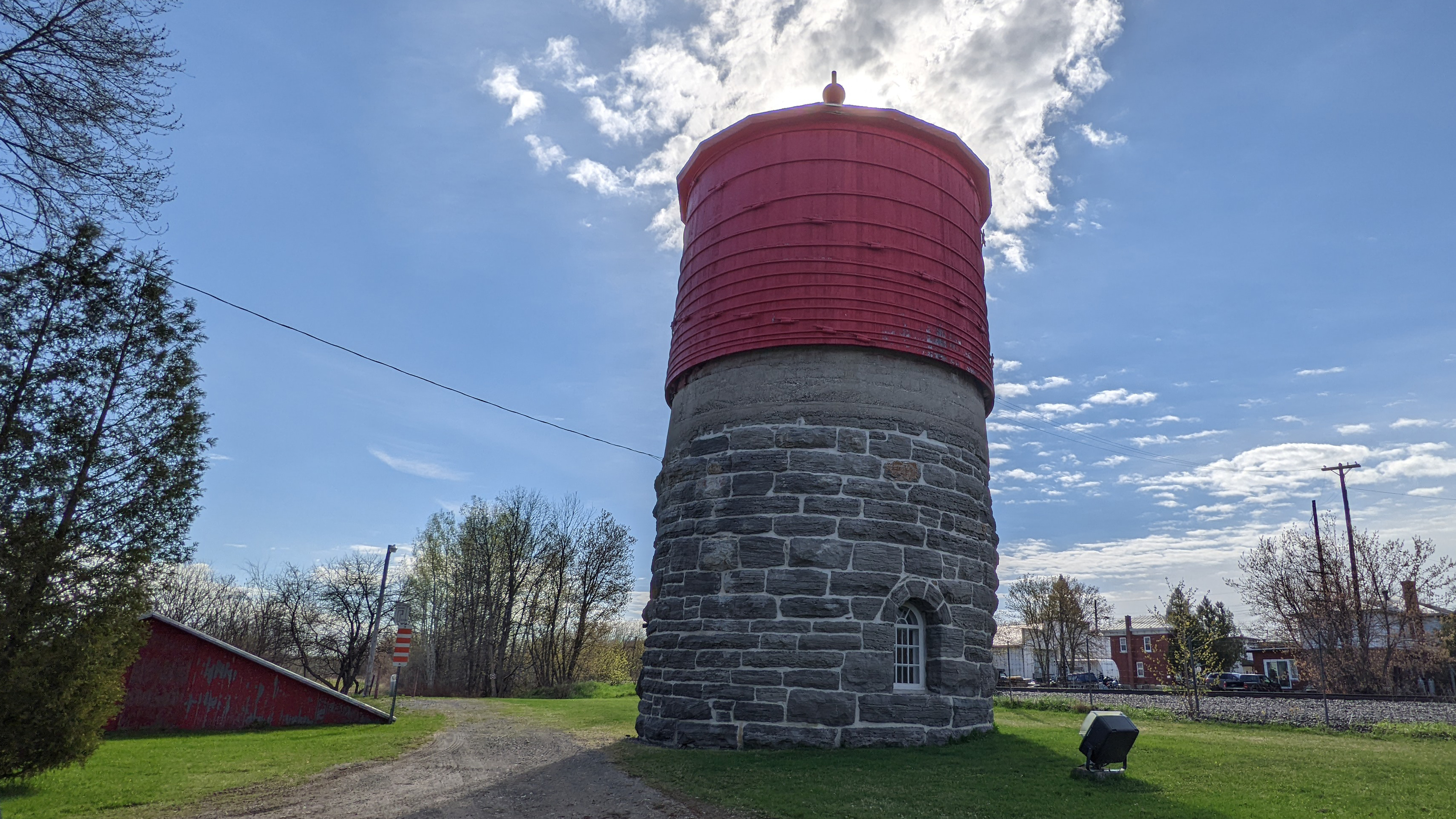
Water Tower

Dalhousie is a small town in south-western Quebec near the border of Ontario, in the municipality of Saint-Télesphore, which is located within Vaudreuil-Soulanges Regional County Municipality, Quebec (Canada). It is named for George Ramsay, 9th Earl of Dalhousie, who served as Governor General of Canada from 1825 to 1828.

== Geographical location ==
It lies 70 km to the west of Montreal, in a predominantly rural environment.

There is also an extension of the settlement — known as Dalhousie Mills — which lies outside Quebec in South Glengarry Township, within Ontario's United Counties of Stormont, Dundas and Glengarry. This also illustrates the historically close links which formerly existed between the border regions of Upper and Lower Canada.

== Historical link with the Canadian Pacific Railway ==
It is sometimes referred to as Dalhousie Station because of its location as a settlement at a former station of the Canadian Pacific Railway / Chemin de fer Canadien Pacifique, which dated from 1884.

A former station water tower area, which was re-landscaped in 2006, remains a significant local landmark: the tower itself is distinguished by its conspicuous profile in the local area and by the solidity of its stonework and Syrian (Romanesque) arching.

== Notable local activities ==
Given the local area's rural location, agriculture is a significant local activity.

In winter months, a snowmobiling club based at Dalhousie Station, "Le Club Étoile Dorée de Dalhousie", founded in 1971, is active among local trails.

=== Historically coincidental link with distinguished botanist ===
By coincidence, as perhaps befits a rural community significantly characterized by agricultural activity, the area's local name at least indirectly refers to the title held in marriage by Christian Ramsay, Countess of Dalhousie (1786-1839), in her day a distinguished botanist whose Canadian collections were catalogued and held by various Canadian institutions of learning.

== See also ==
- Canadian Pacific Railway § History
- South Glengarry, Ontario#Communities
- Vaudreuil-Soulanges Regional County Municipality#Subdivisions
