= Dalhousie Springs =

Group of artesian aquifers in South Australia

Coordinates: 26°27′20″S 135°28′57″E

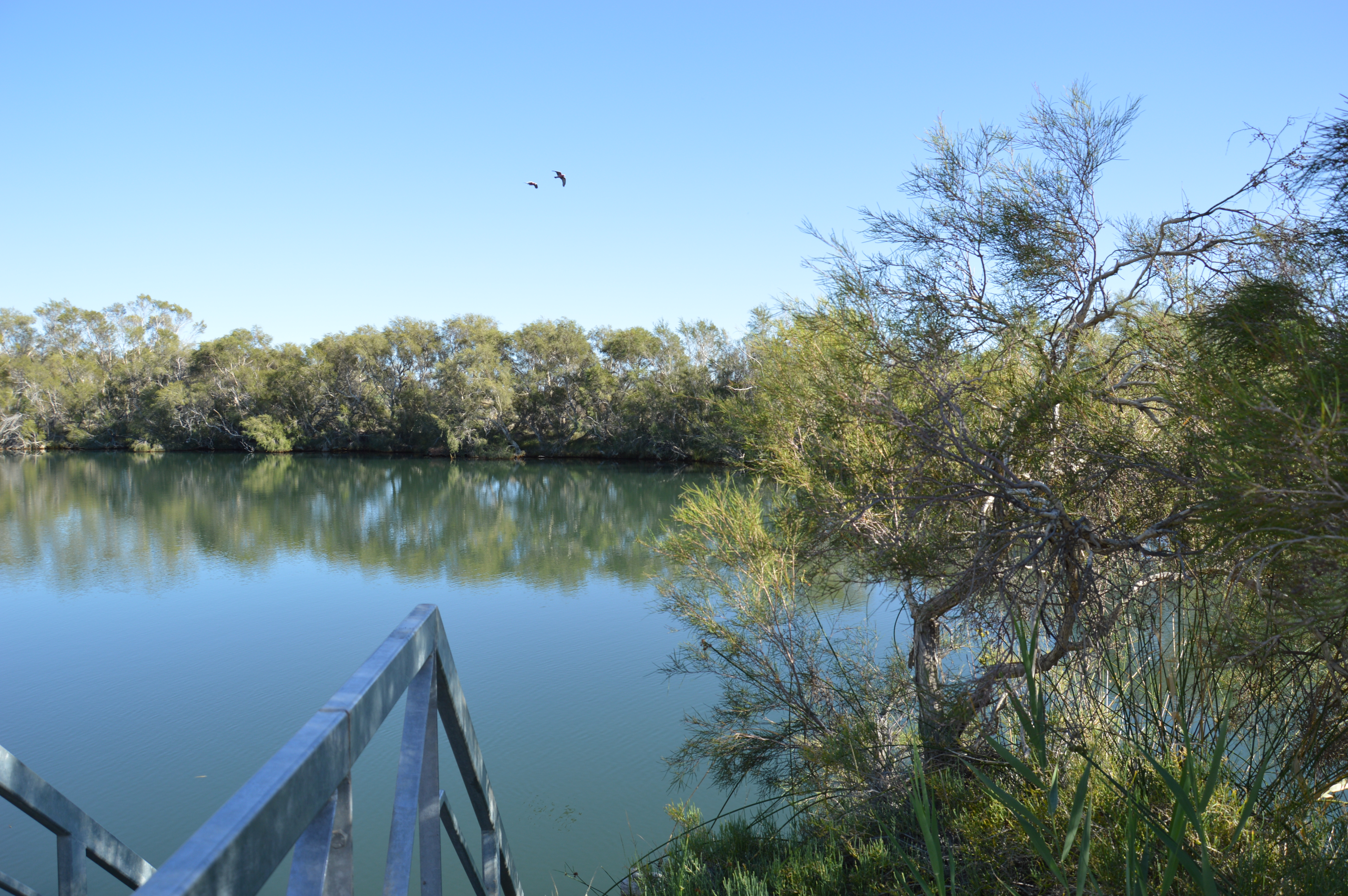
Dalhousie Springs pool

Dalhousie Springs, also known as Witjira-Dalhousie Springs, is a group of over 600 natural artesian springs, in 12 major groups, located in Witjira National Park on the western fringe of the Simpson Desert, 180 kilometres (110 mi) northeast of Oodnadatta in northern South Australia. They are about 250 kilometres (160 mi) southeast of Alice Springs.

== History ==
The springs form part of Aboriginal tradition and life in northern South Australia, being a place associated with many Dreamtime stories and songs. Evidence of large camp sites are found at the Springs, some of which are thousands of square metres in size, and there are many stone artefacts found scattered around the area.

There is conjecture about the English naming of the springs with some believing they were named by surveyor Christopher Giles in August 1893 and that he initially recorded the name 'Edith Springs' after Edith Fergusson. Fergusson who, apparently asked upon hearing of the new name, that it be changed to Dalhousie Springs after her father James Broun-Ramsay, 1st Marquess of Dalhousie. However, there are a number of other theories including that they were named by Richard Randall Knuckey or Albert T Woods.

In 1915, the total flow rate of the Dalhousie Springs complex was over 23,000 litres per second (5,100 impgal/s), but drilling had reduced this to 17,360 litres per second (3,820 impgal/s) by 2000.

Witjira-Dalhousie Springs was added to the Australian National Heritage List in August 2009. In 1980, It was listed on the now-defunct Register of the National Estate.

On 26 November 2021, the government changed the conditions of the park, to forever exclude mining in the Dalhousie Springs National Heritage Area.

== Description ==
Its water comes from part of the Great Artesian Basin aquifer. The Springs complex appears to be recharged by water thousands of years old, percolated down through the beds of Finke and nearby arid zone rivers, which overlie parts of the Great Artesian Basin. As a geological feature, it is unique in Australia.

The water temperatures in the springs range from 38 to 43 degrees Celsius. The water is highly mineralised but just drinkable. There are a number of unique species of fish that live in the waters around Dalhousie Springs, such as the Dalhousie catfish (Neosilurus gloveri), the Dalhousie hardyhead (Craterocephalus dalhousiensis) and the Dalhousie goby (Chlamydogobius gloveri).

Dalhousie Springs is a popular starting point for crossing the Simpson Desert eastwards to Birdsville in Queensland (around 600 kilometres (370 mi)).
