= Edgbaston Reserve =

Australian nature reserve

- IUCN category II (national park)
- Location within Queensland
- Location: Western Australia
- Nearest town: Aramac
- Coordinates: 22.730°S 145.414°E
- Area: 8,165 ha (31.53 sq mi)
- Established: 2008
- Governing body: Bush Heritage Australia
- Website: https://www.bushheritage.org.au/places/edgbaston

Edgbaston Reserve, formerly Edgbaston Station, is a nature reserve on Bidjara Country in central Queensland, Australia, 140 kilometres (87 mi) north-east of Longreach. It lies in the upper catchment of Pelican Creek, which flows into the Thomson River and, ultimately, into Lake Eyre. It lies within the Great Artesian Basin and is notable for its many artesian springs and their plants and animals. It is owned and managed by the nature conservation charity Bush Heritage Australia, by which it was purchased in 2008. The reserve is within the Einasleigh Uplands and Brigalow Belt.

== History ==
Edgbaston was a pastoral lease until acquisition by Bush Heritage. Purchase of the property was assisted by a contribution from the Australian Government's Maintaining Australia's Biodiversity Hotspots program. In 2024, Edgbaston was declared a Special Wildlife Reserve by the Queensland government.

== Landscape ==
As well as the artesian springs and their associated freshwater wetlands, the reserve's landscape includes grassy eucalypt woodlands and rocky escarpments.

== Fauna ==
Edgbaston's springs contain two nationally threatened fish species, the Edgbaston Goby and the Red-finned Blue-eye, as well as many rare and geographically restricted species of invertebrates and plants.
