= Paraíba do Sul =

River in southeast Brazil

Rio Paraíba do Sul
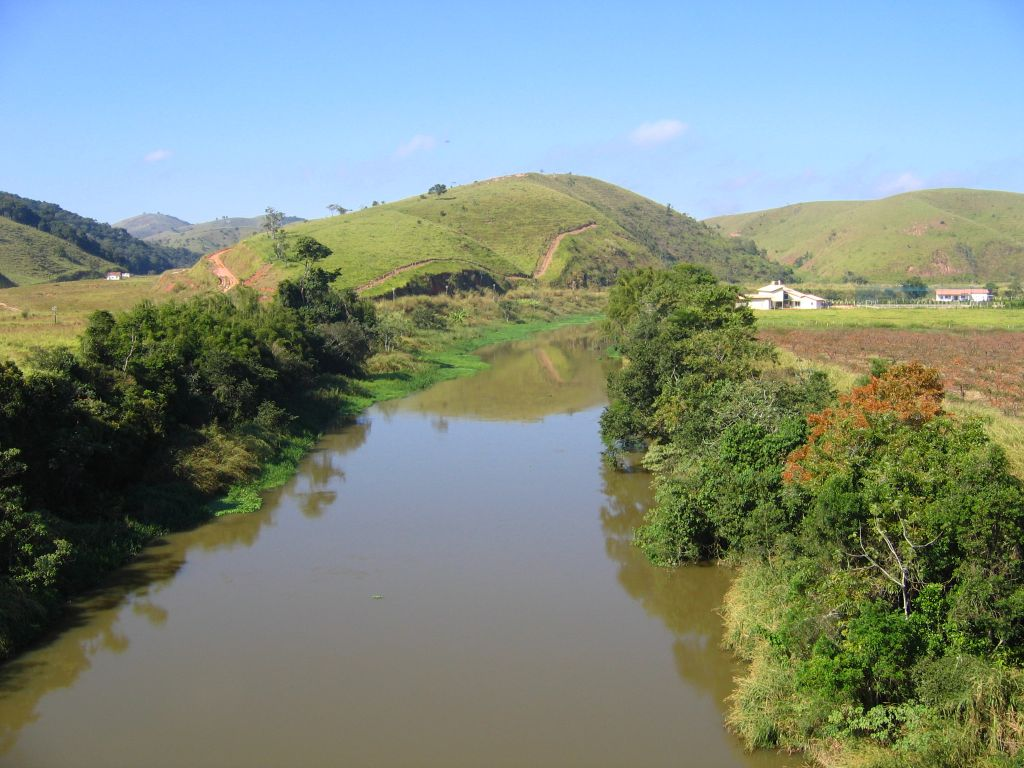
- The Rio Paraíba do Sul near Jacareí, SP

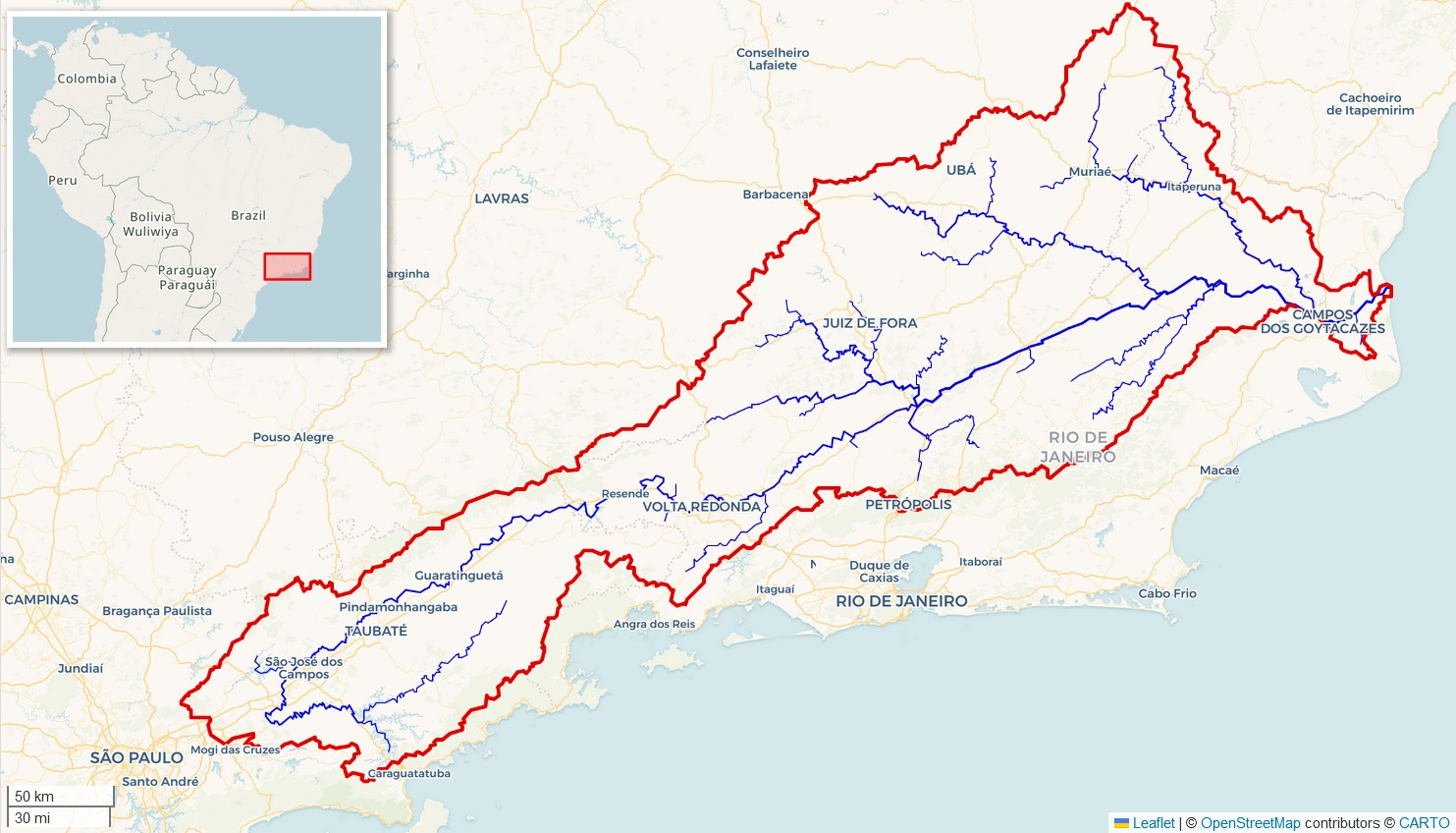
- Paraíba do Sul watershed (Interactive map)

Location
- Country: Brazil
- state: São Paulo, Minas Gerais, Rio de Janeiro

Physical characteristics
- Mouth
  - location: Atlantic Ocean, Campos dos Goytacazes, RJ, Brazil
  - coordinates: 21.62°S 41.01°W
  - elevation: 0 m (0 ft)
- Length: 1,137 km (706 mi)
- Basin size: 56,000 km^{2}
- Discharge
  - average: 1,118 m^{3}/s (39,500 cu ft/s)

Basin features
- Tributaries
  - left: Rio Muriaé, Rio Pomba, Rio Paraibuna, Rio Jaguari
  - right: Rio Dois Rios, Rio Piaha, Rio Paraí

The Paraíba do Sul (Brazilian Portuguese pronunciation: [ˈʁi.u paɾaˈibɐ du ˈsuw]), or simply Paraíba, is a river in southeast Brazil. It flows 1,137 km (706 mi) west to northeast from its farthest source at the source of the river Paraitinga to the sea near Campos dos Goytacazes. The river receives its name when it meets the river Paraibuna at the Paraibuna dam.

Its main tributaries are the rivers Jaguari, Buquira, Paraibuna, Preto, Pomba and Muriaé. These last two are the longest and join the main river 140 km (87 mi) and 50 km (31 mi) from the mouth respectively .

The valley of the Paraíba do Sul ranges from the latitudes 20°26' and 23°39'S and the longitudes of 41° and 46°30'W and covers an area of about 57,000 km^{2} (22,000 mi^{2}) distributed over three states. The main economic activities are industry and cattle raising.

== Navigation ==
Presently only two parts of the river can be navigated:

- The lower section, between the mouth and São Fidélis, about 90 km. It has a declivity of 22 cm/km. There is incipient navigation carried out by small boats that transport mainly construction material to the city of Campos dos Goytacazes.
- The upper middle section, between Cachoeira Paulista and Guararema, about 280 km (170 mi). Despite the small declivity of 19 cm/km, navigation is restricted to tourist boats.

Elsewhere navigation is hampered by various obstacles; waterfalls, rapids, sections with great declivity and various hydroelectric works with no locks. Other factors impeding navigation are the existence of highway and railway bridges, the proximity of roads and railways following the riverbank and the location of several cities on its banks.

== Centres of population ==
The Paraíba Valley is very fertile and has always been a region of relatively dense population. Cities located on or near the river are

- State of Rio de Janeiro:
  - Barra do Piraí
  - Barra Mansa
  - Três Rios
  - Paraiba do Sul
  - Sapucaia
  - Campos dos Goytacazes - center of a rich sugar cane growing area
  - Vassouras - site of a highly respected agricultural university
  - Volta Redonda - site of Brazil's first steel industry)
- State of São Paulo:
  - Aparecida - site of Brazil's most famous Marian pilgrimage site
  - Guaratinguetá
  - São José dos Campos - high-tech industry and home to Embraer, Brazil's aircraft manufacturer
  - Taubaté - Volkswagen and Ford plants
- State of Minas Gerais:
  - Além Paraíba
  - Estrela Dalva
  - Juiz de Fora - Important manufacturing city on the Paraibuna River, one of the major tributaries of the Paraíba.

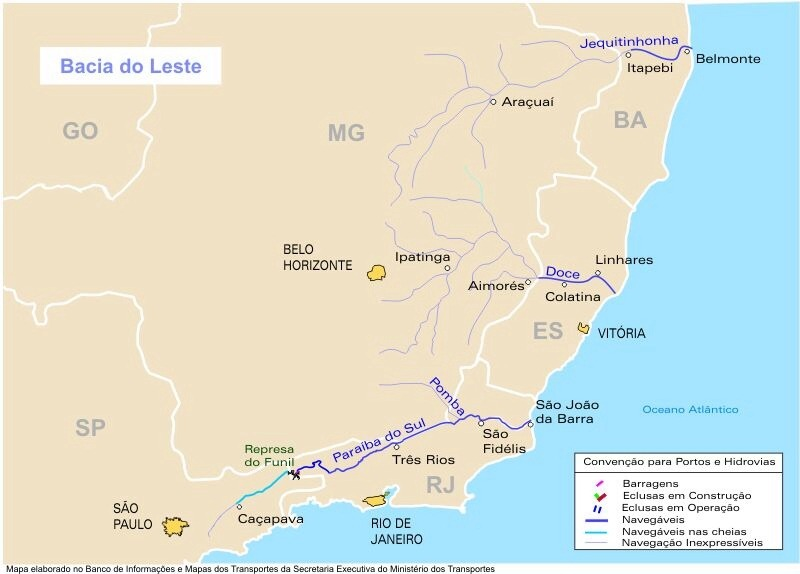
Southeastern Brazil with major rivers highlighted

== Ecology ==
Unlike rivers in northern Brazil where seasonal variations in water temperature generally are relatively limited, those in southern Brazil, such as Paraíba do Sul, exhibit distinct differences between winter and summer. During a survey of the river in Lorena, São Paulo, the water varied from 26.6 °C (79.9 °F) in the summer to 15.2 °C (59.4 °F) in the winter. The pH is neutral and generally fluctuates between 6 and 8.

The Paraíba do Sul basin is home to just above 100 native fish species with most in the families Loricariidae, Characidae and Trichomycteridae. About 40% of the fish species in the river basin are endemic (the genus Oligobrycon is entirely restricted to the basin) and new species have been discovered in recent years, including the small catfish Pareiorhina hyptiorhachis that only was scientifically described in 2013.

As a consequence of flowing through one of the most densely populated and industrialised parts of Brazil, the Paraíba do Sul suffers from pollution. Studies of the native cichlid Geophagus brasiliensis have found that levels of some heavy metals exceed the limits set by the Brazilian Food Legislation. Other threats are dams and the approximately 70 introduced species, including 46 species of non-native fish and the parasitic copepod Lernaea cyprinacea. Several native species (e.g., Brycon insignis, Pogonopoma parahybae and Steindachneridion parahybae) are seriously threatened, and a general fall in abundance and species richness has been observed. Some, such as the endemic Hypostomus auroguttatus, have successfully adapted to the changes. The catfish Potamarius grandoculis is only known from the vicinity of the mouth of the Paraíba do Sul and Doce Rivers, but it may already be extinct.

Other threatened species in the Paraíba do Sul basin are the bivalves Diplodon dunkerianus, D. expansus and D. fontaineanus, and the Hoge's side-necked turtle (Mesoclemmys hogei).

A national conservation plan with recommendations for the river basin was published in 2010.
