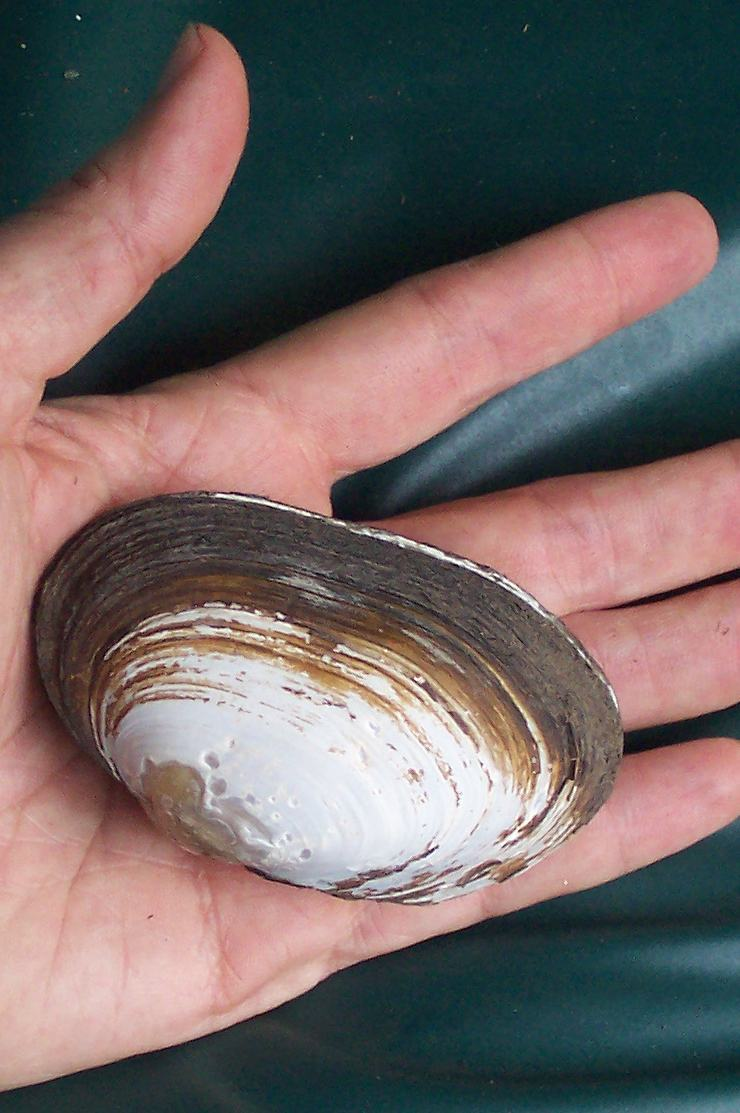
- Velesunio ambiguus

Scientific classification
- Domain: Eukaryota
- Kingdom: Animalia
- Phylum: Mollusca
- Class: Bivalvia
- Order: Unionida
- Family: Hyriidae
- Subfamily: Velesunioninae
- Genus: Velesunio; Iredale, 1934

= Velesunio =

Genus of bivalves

Velesunio is a genus of medium to large sized mussels in the family Hyriidae.

== Distribution ==
Velesunio are found on mainland Australia and Tasmania. Velesunio also occur in Papua New Guinea.

== Habitat and ecology ==
Lives with two thirds of their shell buried in the sediment (making them infaunal) in rivers, streams, lakes, billabongs and water catchment dams.

== List of species ==
A list of species included in the genus of Velesunio:

- Velesunio ambiguus (Philippi, 1847)
- Velesunio angasi (Sowerby, 1867)
- Velesunio moretonicus (Sowerby, 1865)
- Velesunio sentaniensis (Haas, 1924)
- Velesunio wilsonii (Lea, 1859)

Note:

Species of Velesunio may appear very similar in appearance to those of Alathyria, Hyridella, Cucumerunio and Westralunio.

The type species for this genus is Unio balonnensis Conrad, 1850 collected from the Balonne River, New South Wales.
