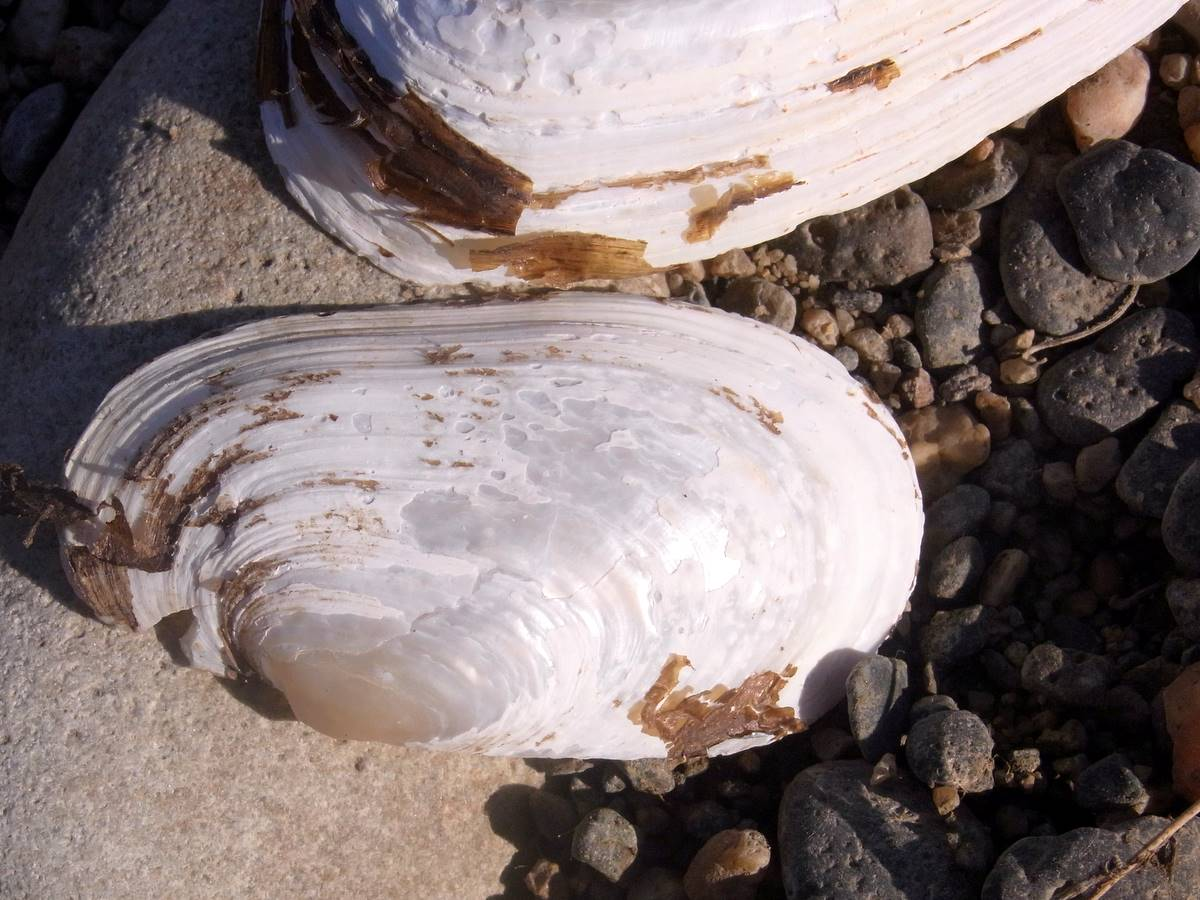
- Valves of Alathyria profuga at the edge of the river in Goulburn River National Park, Australia

Scientific classification
- Kingdom: Animalia
- Phylum: Mollusca
- Class: Bivalvia
- Order: Unionida
- Family: Hyriidae
- Genus: Alathyria
- Species: A. profuga

Binomial name
- Alathyria profuga (Gould, 1850)

Synonyms
- Unio profugus Gould, A. 1850; Alathyria vadena Iredale, T. 1943

= Alathyria profuga =

Species of bivalve

Alathyria profuga, also known as the profuga mussel, is a species of freshwater bivalve in the family Hyriidae. This species occurs in coastal rivers in eastern New South Wales, Australia. The type specimen was collected from the Hunter River.
