= Castalia martensi =

Conservation status
- Vulnerable (IUCN 2.3)

Scientific classification
- Kingdom: Animalia
- Phylum: Mollusca
- Class: Bivalvia
- Order: Unionida
- Family: Hyriidae
- Genus: Castalia
- Species: C. martensi

Binomial name
- Castalia martensi Thewing, 1891

Species of bivalve

Castalia martensi is a species of freshwater mussel in the family Hyriidae. It is endemic to Brazil.
