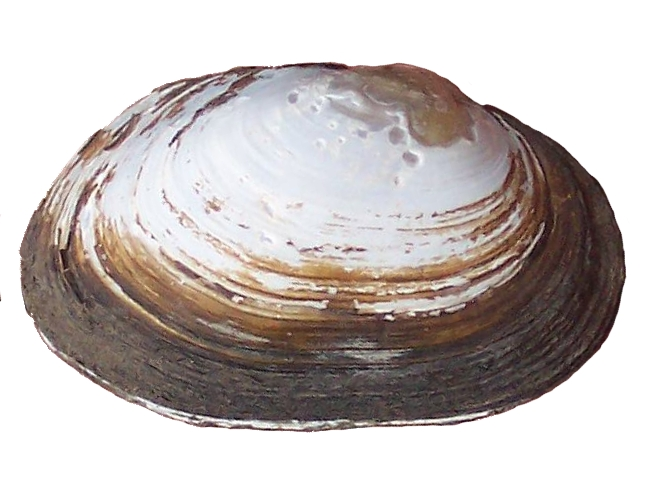
- View of the right valve of Velesunio ambiguus, from Ashley via Moree, Australia.

Scientific classification
- Domain: Eukaryota
- Kingdom: Animalia
- Phylum: Mollusca
- Class: Bivalvia
- Order: Unionida
- Family: Hyriidae
- Genus: Velesunio
- Species: V. ambiguus

Binomial name
- Velesunio ambiguus (Philippi, 1847)

Synonyms
- Unio ambiguus Philippi, 1847; Unio balonnensis Conrad, 1850; Unio balonensis Lea, 1852; Unio vittatus Lea, 1859; Unio philippianus Küster, 1861; Unio (Alasmodon) evansi Adams & Angas, 1864; Unio danellii Lea, 1870; Unio daniellii Villa, 1871; Unio jeffreysianus Lea, 1871; Unio fairfieldi in coll. UMMZ; Unio ambiguus E.A. Smith, 1881; Hyridella australis E.A. Smith, 1881; Unio protovittatus Hale & Tindale, 1930; Velesunio balonnensis adjunctus Iredale, 1934; Velesunio balonnensis intricatus Iredale, 1934; Velesunio transitus Iredale, 1943; Velesunio mckeowni Iredale, 1943; Velesunio testatus Iredale, 1943; Velesunio ambiguous Graf & Cummings, 2006

= Floodplain mussel =

Species of bivalve

Velesunio ambiguus, the floodplain mussel, or the billabong mussel (South Australia), is a species of freshwater bivalve in the family Hyriidae.

There are four other cryptic species in the genus Velesunio (which all look similar to Velesunio ambiguus) in Australia.

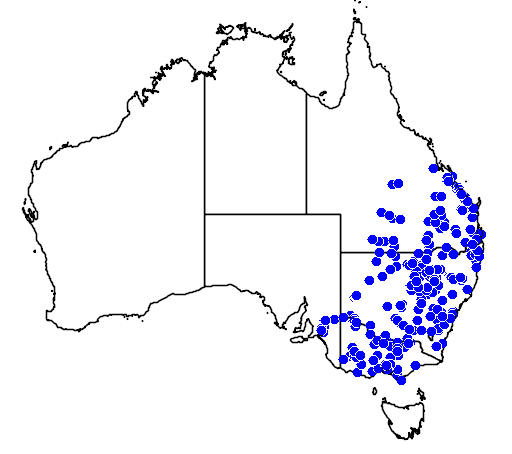
distribution map

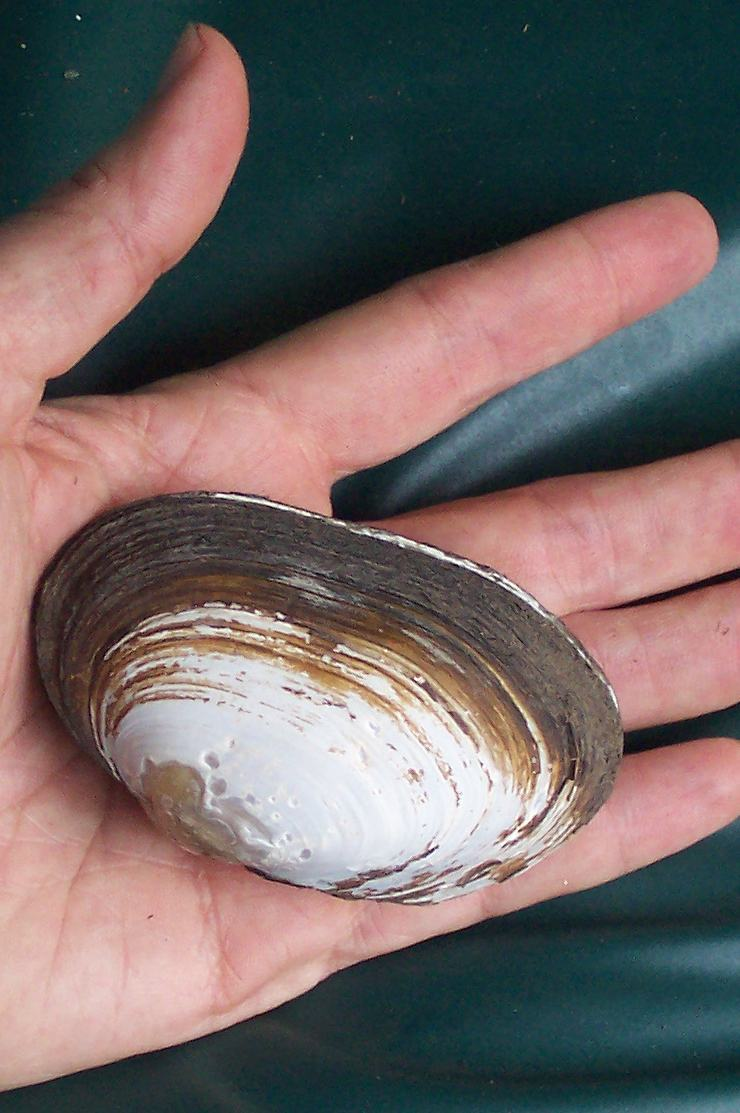
Comparison of the size of Velesunio ambiguus with a man's hand. This shell is 85 mm long and 49 mm wide.

== Distribution ==
Australia: Queensland, New South Wales, Victoria, and South Australia, where it is known as the billabong mussel.

== Biotope ==
Static waters.

== Life cycle ==
The lifespan of this mussel is over 20 years.

It can survive temperatures from around 4 °C to over 30 °C.

== Human uses ==
Velesunio ambiguus serves as a food for Australian Aboriginal people, although its flesh is tough.

This species can also be used in fish ponds to filter microscopic algae out of the water.
