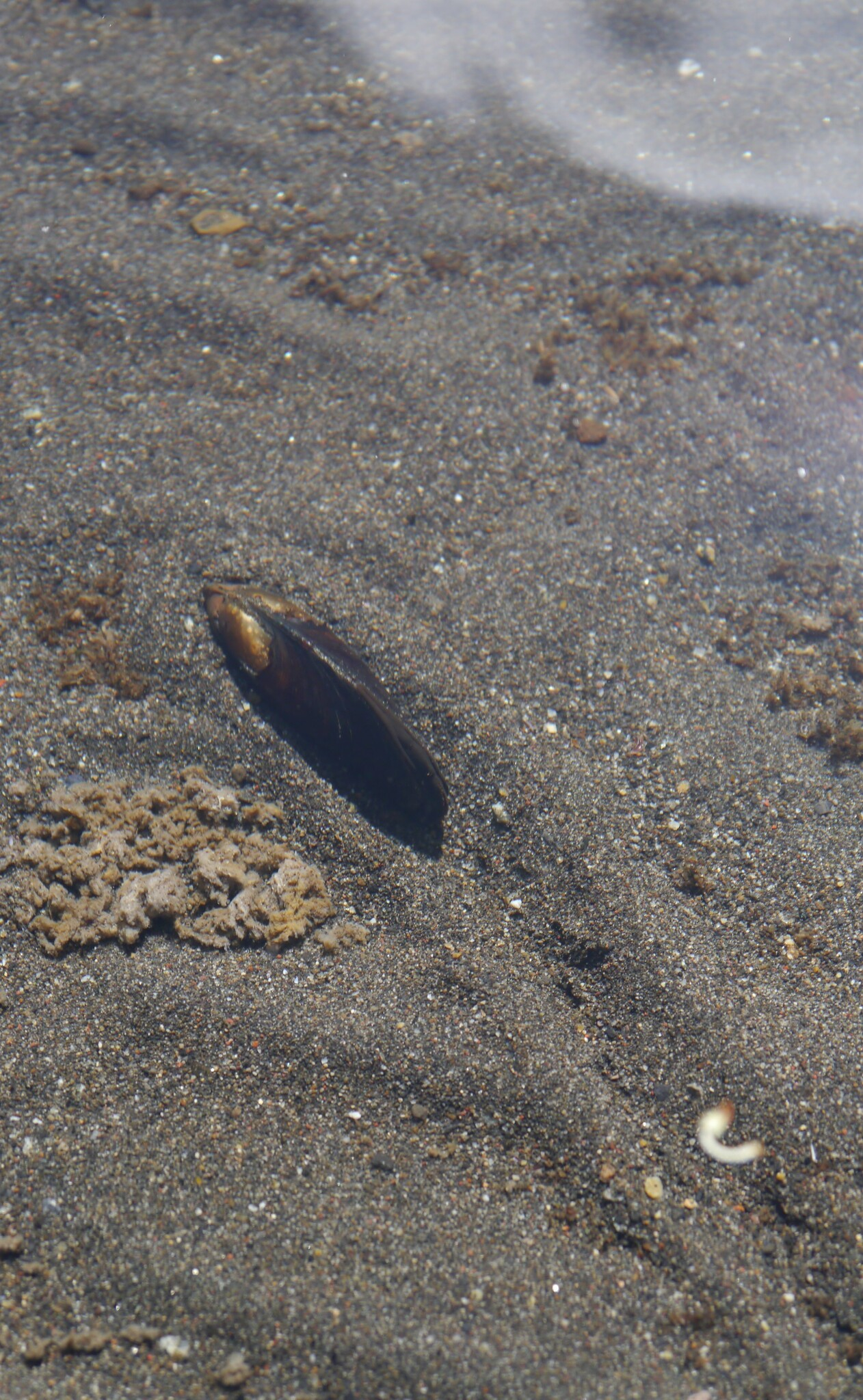

Conservation status
- Least Concern (IUCN 3.1)

Scientific classification
- Kingdom: Animalia
- Phylum: Mollusca
- Class: Bivalvia
- Order: Unionida
- Family: Hyriidae
- Genus: Diplodon
- Species: D. chilensis

Binomial name
- Diplodon chilensis Gray

= Diplodon chilensis =

Species of mollusc

Diplodon chilensis is a species of mussel in the family Hyriidae. It is native to Chile and Argentina. In Chile, it is the most common freshwater mussel species, and inhabits lentic and lotic environments. The species is sensitive to turbidity and water levels of phosphorus. Its filtering capacity has been proposed as a biocontrol of salmon farming eutrophication.
