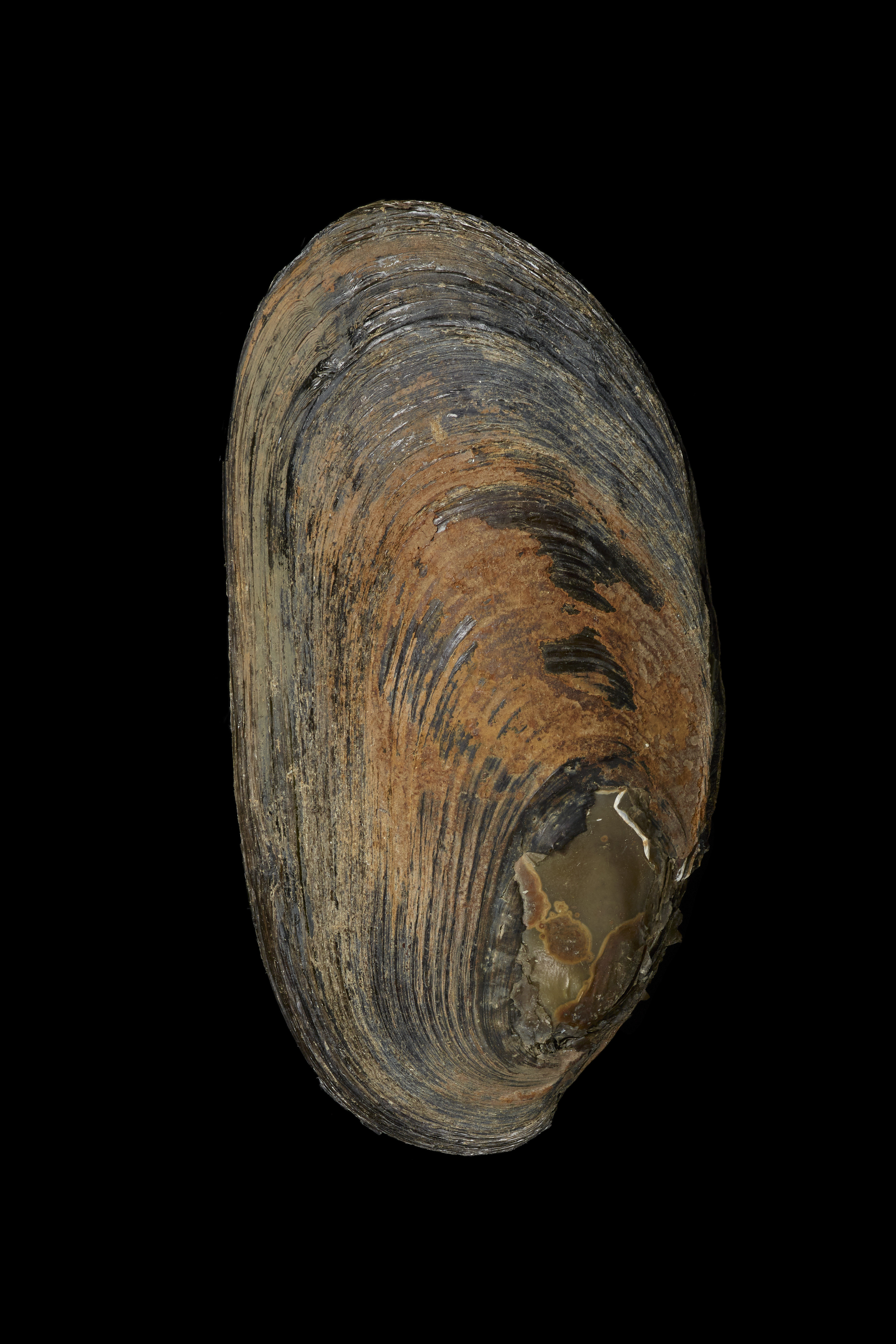

Conservation status
- Least Concern (IUCN 3.1)

- Naturally Uncommon (NZ TCS)

Scientific classification
- Kingdom: Animalia
- Phylum: Mollusca
- Class: Bivalvia
- Order: Unionida
- Family: Hyriidae
- Genus: Echyridella
- Species: E. onekaka

Binomial name
- Echyridella onekaka Fenwick & Marshall, 2006

Synonyms
- Diplodon lutulentus Suter, 1913

= Echyridella onekaka =

Species of bivalve

Echyridella onekaka is a species of freshwater mussel endemic to New Zealand. E. onekaka is an aquatic bivalve mollusc in the family Unionidae, the river mussels.

== Taxonomy ==
The species was first recognised as a distinct species by Mark Fenwick and Bruce Marshall in 2006. It can be distinguished from Echyridella menziesii by a more strongly separated anterior pedal retractor muscle.

== Distribution ==
Echyridella onekaka is found exclusively in the north-west of the South Island. It is the rarest known freshwater mussel species in New Zealand.
