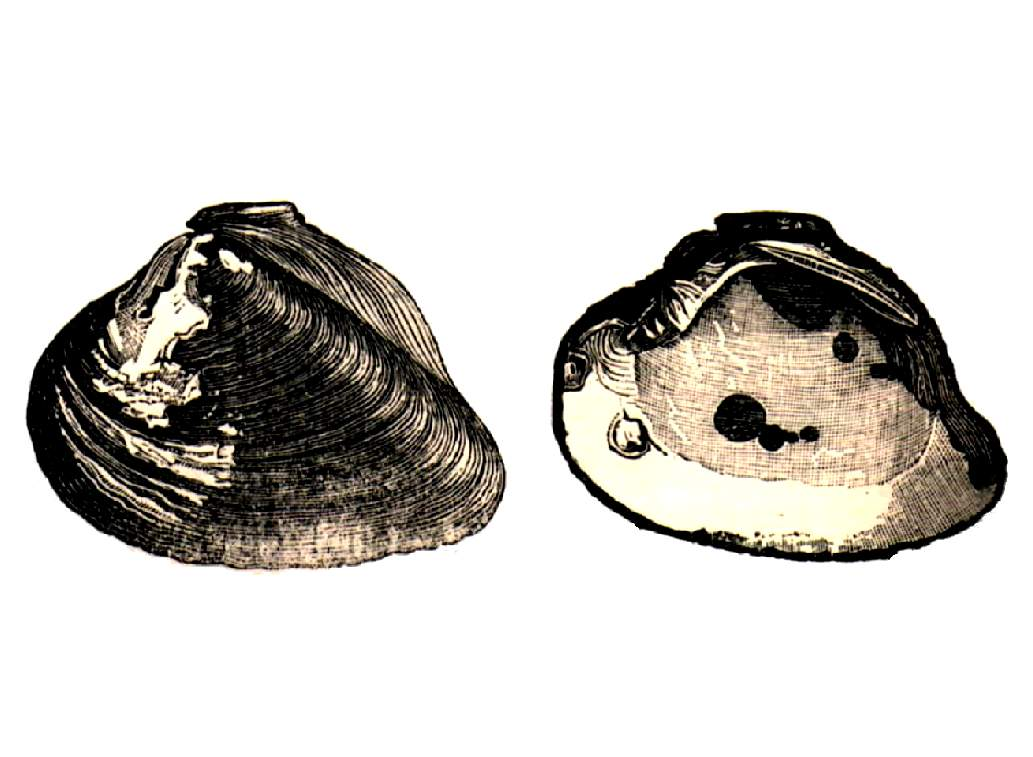

Conservation status
- Least Concern (IUCN 3.1)

Scientific classification
- Kingdom: Animalia
- Phylum: Mollusca
- Class: Bivalvia
- Order: Unionida
- Family: Hyriidae
- Genus: Castalia
- Species: C. ambigua

Binomial name
- Castalia ambigua Lamarck, 1819

= Castalia ambigua =

Species of mollusc

Castalia ambigua is a species of bivalve of the family Hyriidae described by Lamarck in 1819.
