= Westralunio carteri =

Conservation status
- Vulnerable (IUCN 3.1)

Scientific classification
- Kingdom: Animalia
- Phylum: Mollusca
- Class: Bivalvia
- Order: Unionida
- Family: Hyriidae
- Genus: Westralunio
- Species: W. carteri

Binomial name
- Westralunio carteri Iredale, 1934

Species of bivalve

Westralunio carteri is a species of freshwater mussel in the family Hyriidae. It is endemic to Western Australia. It is known by the common name Carter's freshwater mussel. This is one of two species found in Australia belonging to the Westralunio genus.

== Reproduction ==
Westralunio carteri generally has separate sexes (males and females), but hermaphrodites occur occasionally. Gametes (sperm in males or eggs in females) develop in the gonads and, with the onset of spawning, eggs migrate from the female gonads (ovaries) into specialised areas of the gills known as 'marsupia'. At this stage, females are 'gravid'. Fertilised eggs of Westralunio carteri (and other species of Hyriidae) are brooded to become embryos, which develop into larvae, known as 'glochidia'.

== Parasitic stage ==
Glochidia of most species of freshwater mussels are obligate parasites of fishes, but sometimes amphibians. In Westralunio carteri, a mature glochidium is equipped with a pair of interlocking 'larval teeth' on opposing valves; the shell is translucent brown in colour and has a single adductor muscle and shell length, on average, is 306-309 μm. Mature glochidia are released from females during spring on strands of mucus while still encased in their vitelline membranes (a proteinaceous 'egg sac'),. Shortly after release, they hatch from their vitelline membranes and begin characteristically 'winking' in preparation to attach to a passing fish,. Once contact is made with a fish, the glochidia attach to the fishes' body surfaces including areas of the fins, eye, mouth, opercula, and sometimes the gills,. Following attachment to their host fish, the glochidia are encased by epithelial cells, which forms a cyst,. They remain in the cyst for 21–28 days as the undergo a process of metamorphosis and develop into juvenile freshwater mussels (characterised by the disappearance of the single adductor muscle and the formation of two separate adductor muscles and a ciliated foot, among other features) when they then detach from their host and begin life in the sediments, where they develop into their adult form,.

== Post-larval growth ==
Juvenile Westralunio carteri are the same size as glochidia immediately after detachment from their host, but grow rapidly and develop for several years thereafter. Westralunio carteri reaches sexual maturity at a size of 25–30 mm long at 2–3 years of age. Growth slows as they age and the maximum recorded size for the species is 101 mm long, but are typically less than 90 mm long. Age-at-length and growth rates are variable between populations, but for the populations which have been validated, maximum ages range between 40 and 50 years old and ages of individuals of the same size from different populations can vary by as much as 10 years.

== Ecosystem Services ==
Like other freshwater mussels, Westralunio carteri is recognised as a provider of ecosystem services due to filter-feeding activities. Adult W. carteri are capable of filtering over 1L of water per individual per hour, with mean clearance rates estimated at ~ 300 mL/ind./hour.
