= Diplodon pfeifferi =

Conservation status
- Vulnerable (IUCN 2.3)

Scientific classification
- Kingdom: Animalia
- Phylum: Mollusca
- Class: Bivalvia
- Order: Unionida
- Family: Hyriidae
- Genus: Diplodon
- Species: D. pfeifferi

Binomial name
- Diplodon pfeifferi Dunker, 1819

Species of bivalve

Diplodon pfeifferi is a species of bivalve in the family Hyriidae. It is endemic to Brazil.
