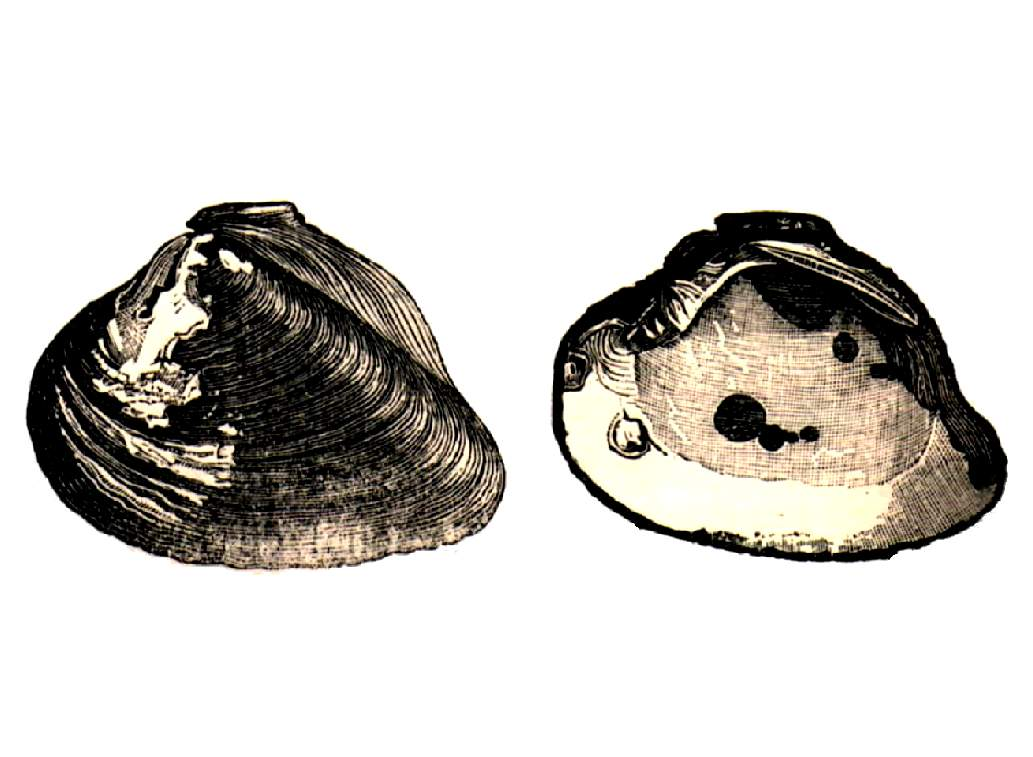
- Castalia ambigua

Scientific classification
- Domain: Eukaryota
- Kingdom: Animalia
- Phylum: Mollusca
- Class: Bivalvia
- Order: Unionida
- Family: Hyriidae
- Genus: Castalia; Lamarck, 1819

= Castalia (bivalve) =

Genus of bivalves

Castalia is a genus of bivalves belonging to the family Hyriidae.

The species of this genus are found in America.

Species:

- Castalia ambigua Lamarck, 1819
- Castalia cordata Swainson, 1840
- Castalia cretacea Mezzalira & Simone, 1999
- Castalia crosseana Hidalgo, 1865
- Castalia ecarinata Mousson, 1869
- Castalia inflata d'Orbigny, 1835
- Castalia martensi (Ihering, 1891)
- Castalia minuta Mezzalira & Simone, 1999
- Castalia multisulcata Hupé, 1857
- Castalia nehringi (Ihering, 1893)
- Castalia orbignyi (Deville & Hupé, 1850)
- Castalia orinocensis Morrison, 1943
- Castalia pazi Hidalgo, 1868
- Castalia psammoica (d'Orbigny, 1835)
- Castalia stevensi (H.B.Baker, 1930)
- Castalia undosa E.von Martens, 1885
