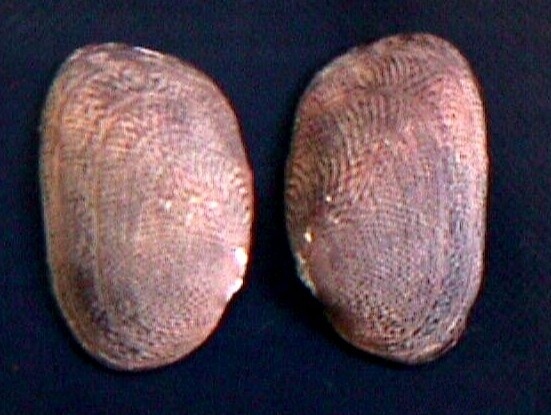
- Diplodon granosus

Scientific classification
- Domain: Eukaryota
- Kingdom: Animalia
- Phylum: Mollusca
- Class: Bivalvia
- Order: Unionida
- Family: Hyriidae
- Subfamily: Hyriinae
- Genus: Diplodon; Spix, 1827

= Diplodon =

Genus of bivalves

Diplodon is a genus of freshwater pearly mussel, an aquatic bivalve in the Hyriidae family.

The genus includes the following species:

- Diplodon chilensis
- Diplodon delodontus
- Diplodon dunkerianus
- Diplodon expansus
- Diplodon fontaineanus
- Diplodon granosus
- Diplodon pfeifferi

Diplodon websteri is a synonym for Cucumerunio websteri.
