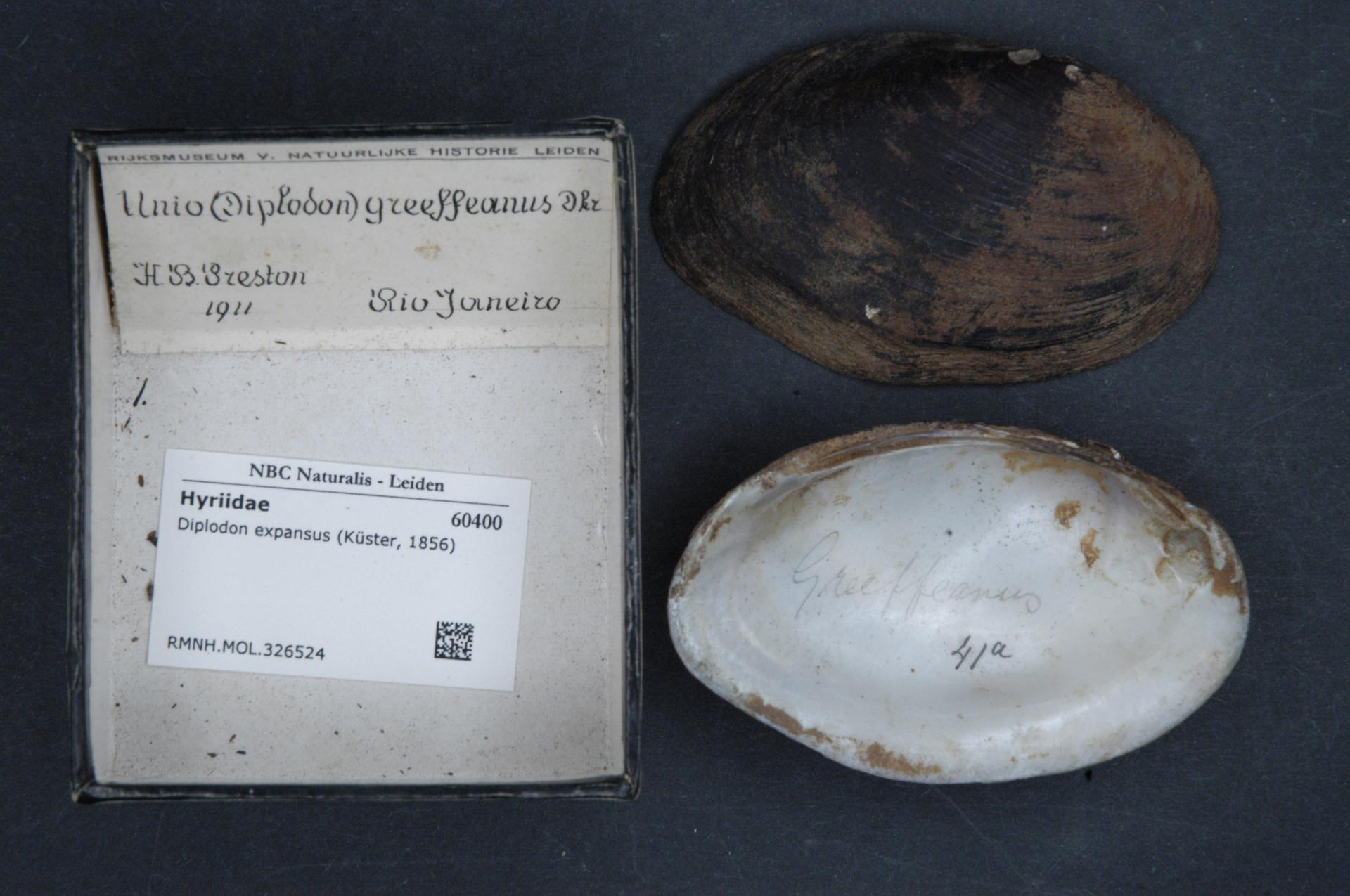

Conservation status
- Vulnerable (IUCN 2.3)

Scientific classification
- Kingdom: Animalia
- Phylum: Mollusca
- Class: Bivalvia
- Order: Unionida
- Family: Hyriidae
- Genus: Diplodon
- Species: D. expansus

Binomial name
- Diplodon expansus Kuester, 1856

= Diplodon expansus =

Species of bivalve

Diplodon expansus is a species of freshwater mussel in the family Hyriidae. It is endemic to Brazil.
