= Oligobrycon =

Conservation status
- Data Deficient (IUCN 3.1)

Scientific classification
- Kingdom: Animalia
- Phylum: Chordata
- Class: Actinopterygii
- Order: Characiformes
- Family: incertae sedis
- Genus: Oligobrycon; C. H. Eigenmann, 1915
- Species: O. microstomus

Binomial name
- Oligobrycon microstomus C. H. Eigenmann, 1915

Species of fish

Oligoobrycon is a monospecific genus of freshwater ray-finned fish belonging to the suborder Characoidei within the order Characiformes, the characins. The only species in the genus is Oligobrycon microstomus, a species of which is endemic to Brazil, where it is found in the upper middle Paraíba do Sul River basin. This taxon has not been assigned to a particular family within the Characoidei and is considered to be incertae sedis, i.e. its taxonomic affinities are, as yet, unclear. This fish has not been recorded since the holotype and paratype were collected in 1915.
