= Charles Torrey Simpson =

American botanist, malacologist, and conservationist

- Charles Torrey Simpson
- Born: June 3, 1846; Tiskilwa, Illinois, U.S.
- Died: December 17, 1932 (aged 86); Lemon City, Miami, Florida, U.S.
- Scientific career
- Fields: Botanist
- Workplaces: Smithsonian Institution

Charles Torrey Simpson (June 3, 1846 – December 17, 1932) was an American botanist, malacologist, and conservationist. He retired to Florida where he became known for conservation.

== Scientific work ==
His initial scientific interests included collecting shells, and he began as a conchologist. Although he had little more than a high school education he became well regarded in the field and in 1889 was hired by the Smithsonian Institution. He went on to work at the National Museum of Natural History from 1899 to 1902. He was interested mainly in freshwater bivalves and also in land snails of Florida.

== Life in Florida ==
In Florida Simpson gained the nickname "The Sage of Biscayne Bay" and wrote several books about tropical plant life around Miami. His backyard contained a tropical hardwood hammock, which he estimated he showed to approximately 50,000 people. Though he tended to avoid controversy regarding development, in Ornamental Gardening in Florida, he wrote, "Mankind everywhere has an insane desire to waste and destroy the good and beautiful things this nature has lavished upon him". In 1927 he received an honorary doctorate from the University of Miami. Simpson Park Hammock near Downtown Miami is named in his honor.

== Bibliography ==
(incomplete)

- 1916. Ornamental gardening in Florida. (self published), Little River, Florida. 198 pp.
- 1920. In lower Florida wilds; a naturalist's observations on the life, physical geography, and geology of the more tropical part of the state. G. P. Putnam's Sons, New York and London. 404 pp.
- 1923. Out of Doors in Florida. E. B. Douglas, Miami. 412 pp.
- 1932. Florida Wild Life. Macmillan, New York. 199 pp.

Malacological works:

- 1887. "Contributions to the Mollusca of Florida". Proceedings of the Davenport Academy of Natural Sciences 5: 45-72.
- 1888. "Notes on some Indian Territory shells". Proceedings of the United States National Museum 11: 449-454.
- 1889. "Contributions to the Mollusca of Florida". Proceedings of the Davenport Academy of Natural Sciences 5: 63-72.
- 1891. "On the means of distribution of Unionidae in the Southeastern United States". Nautilus 5(2): 15-17.
- 1891. "Notes on Unionidae". Nautilus 5(8): 86-88.
- 1892. "On a revision of the American Unionidae". Nautilus 6(7): 78-80.
- 1892. "Notes on the Unionidae of Florida and the southeastern states". Proceedings of the United States National Museum 15(911): 405-436 + 26 plates.
- 1893. "On the relationships and distribution of the North American Unionidae, with notes on the West Coast species". American Naturalist 27(316): 353-358.
- 1893. "A new Anodonta". Nautilus 6(12): 134-135.
- 1893. "Unio coruscus, subluridus, etc." Nautilus 6(12): 143-144.
- 1893. "A review of Von Ihering's classification of the Unionidae and Mutelidae". Nautilus 7(2):17-21.
- 1893. "A reply to professor Wheeler". Nautilus 7(2): 22-23.
- 1893. "On some fossil unios and other fresh-water shells from the drift at Toronto, Canada: With a review of the distribution of the Unionidae of northeastern North America". Proceedings of the United States National Museum 16(952): 591-595.
- 1894. "Types of Anodonta dejecta rediscovered". Nautilus 8(5): 52.
- 1895. "On the validity of the genus Margaritana". American Naturalist 29(340): 336-344.
- 1895. "Note on Unio oregonenses Lea". Nautilus 8(10): 116-118.
- 1895. "Unio ochraceus and cariosus". Nautilus 8(11):121-123 [correction regarding the text figures in 8(12):143].
- 1895. "Pleurocera subulare in water-mains". Nautilus 9(4): 37-38.
- 1896. "On the Mississippi Valley Unionidae found in the St. Lawrence and Atlantic drainage areas". American Naturalist 30(353): 379-384.
- 1896. "The mussel scars of Unios". Nautilus 10(3): 29-30.
- 1896. "Notes on the parvus group of Unionidae and its allies". Nautilus 10(5): 57-59.
- 1896. "The classification and geographical distribution of the pearly fresh-water mussels". Proceedings of the United States National Museum 18(1068): 295-343 + 1 map.
- 1896. "Description of four new Triassic unios from the Staked Plains of Texas". Proceedings of the United States National Museum 18(1072): 381-385.
- 1897. "Notes on the classification of the Unios". Nautilus 11(2): 18-23.
- 1899. "The pearly fresh-water mussels of the United States; their habits, enemies, and diseases, with suggestions for their protection". Bulletin of the U.S. Fish Commission. [Issued separately as U.S. Bureau of Fisheries Document 413]. 18(1898): 279-288.
- 1900. "Unionidae of Indiana". (Review). Nautilus 14(8): 95-96.
- 1900. "New and unfigured Unionidae". Proceedings of the Academy of Natural Sciences of Philadelphia 52(1900): 74-86 + 5 plates.
- 1900. "Synopsis of the naiades, or pearly fresh-water mussels". Proceedings of the United States National Museum 22(1205): 501-1044.
- 1900. "On the evidence of the Unionidae regarding the former courses of the Tennessee and other southern rivers". Science 12(291): 133-136.
- [Simpson, C.T.]. 1901. "Alasmidonta marginata Say". Nautilus 15(2): 16-17.
- 1901. "On the classification of the Unionidae". Nautilus 15(7): 77-82.
- 1902. "A new naiad from New Zealand". Nautilus 16(3): 30. - Type description of Cucumerunio websteri
- Dall W. H. & Simpson C. T. 1902. "The mollusca of Porto Rico". Bulletin of the U.S. Fish Commission, Washington. 351-524.
- 1914. A descriptive catalogue of the naiades, or pearly fresh-water mussels. Parts I-III. Bryant Walker, Detroit, Michigan xii + 1540 pp.
  - 1914. Part I. Unionidae Truncilla - Margaritana
  - 1914. Part II. Unionidae, Unio - Nodularia.
  - 1914. Part III. Unionidae, Harmandia - Diplodon. MUtelidae.

This checklist is based on Simpson's 1900s "Synopsis of the naiades...":

- Wright B. H. & Walker B. 1902. Check list of North American Naiades. Detroit, Michigan.

== See also ==
- Category:Taxa named by Charles Torrey Simpson
