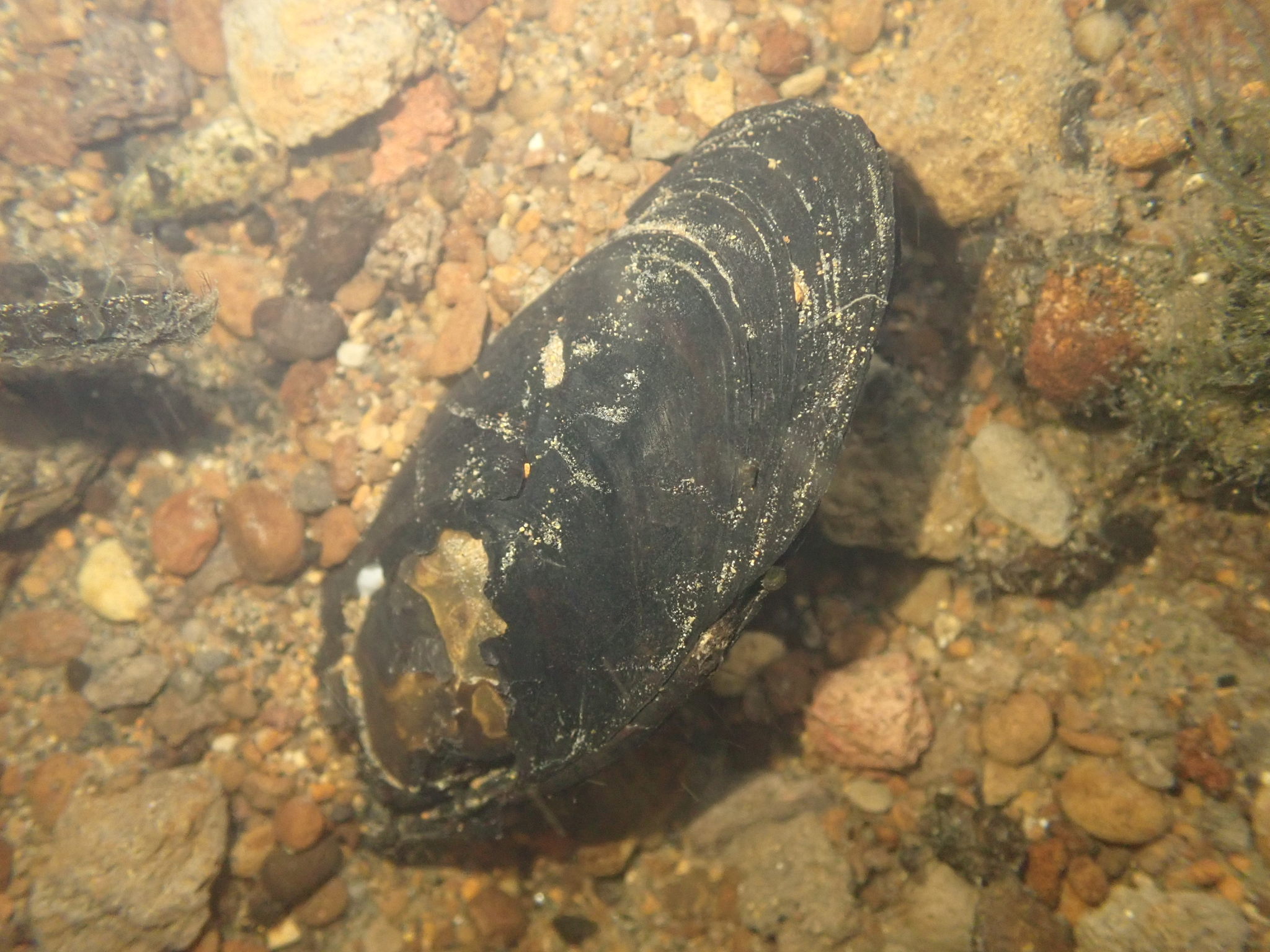

Conservation status
- Least Concern (IUCN 3.1)

- Declining (NZ TCS)

Scientific classification
- Kingdom: Animalia
- Phylum: Mollusca
- Class: Bivalvia
- Order: Unionida
- Family: Unionidae
- Genus: Echyridella
- Species: E. menziesii

Binomial name
- Echyridella menziesii (Gray, 1843)

Synonyms
- Diplodon menziesii (Gray, 1843); Diplodon menziesii acuta Suter, 1907; Hyridella menziesii Gray, 1843; Unio waikarensis Colenso, 1845; Unis depauperata Hutton, 1883

= Echyridella menziesii =

Species of bivalve

Echyridella menziesii, the New Zealand freshwater mussel, also known by its Māori names kākahi, kāeo, and torewai, is a species of freshwater mussel endemic to New Zealand. E. menziesii is an aquatic bivalve mollusc in the family Unionidae, the river mussels.

They were an important food source for the Māori, but like many freshwater mussels worldwide, are now endangered by pollution and eutrophication of rivers, and the introduction of new species of fish leading to actions via the Treaty of Waitangi claims process.

It is one of three species of native freshwater mussels identified in New Zealand, the others being Echyridella aucklandica and Echyridella onekaka.

== Taxonomy ==
The species was first described by John Edward Gray in 1843, who named the species after Archibald Menzies, the surgeon of HMS Discovery.

== Distribution ==
Formerly common in lakes, rivers and streams in New Zealand.

== Ecology ==
=== Life cycle ===
Its reproductive cycle is typical of other freshwater mussels, requiring a host fish on which its larvae (glochidia) parasitise and metamorphose into juvenile mussels – most commonly the kōaro (Galaxias brevipinnis) and Gobiomorphus cotidianus.

=== Feeding ===
While Echyridella menziesii are parasitic as larvae, juveniles feed by grabbing food using their foot. Adult Echyridella menziesii are filter feeders, feeding on phytoplankton, animal matter and bacteria. A single mussel is able to filter a litre of water every hour.

== Threats ==
The destruction or modification of the habitat of the New Zealand freshwater mussel is likely to be a factor in the decline of its population. This modification or destruction of freshwater habitat is also likely to be a factor in the decline in numbers of the mussel's host fish, the kōaro.

== History ==
Kākahi has been a traditional food for Māori since the Archaic period of Māori history, and can be found in many early middens. The presence of kākahi around the central North Island lakes may have been a major reason for many central North Island iwi to settle around the lakes. The mussels were harvested by using a rou kākahi, a tool used to dredge mussel beds. Kākahi shells were traditionally used as cutting implements, and strings of shells were used as a way to scare rats away from kūmara (sweet potato) plantations.

== Conservation status and efforts ==
In May 2014 the Department of Conservation classified the New Zealand freshwater mussel under the New Zealand Threat Classification System as "At risk" and "declining".
