= Diplodon dunkerianus =

Conservation status
- Endangered (IUCN 2.3)

Scientific classification
- Kingdom: Animalia
- Phylum: Mollusca
- Class: Bivalvia
- Order: Unionida
- Family: Hyriidae
- Genus: Diplodon
- Species: D. dunkerianus

Binomial name
- Diplodon dunkerianus Lea, 1857

Species of bivalve

Diplodon dunkerianus is a species of bivalve in the family Hyriidae. It is endemic to Brazil.
