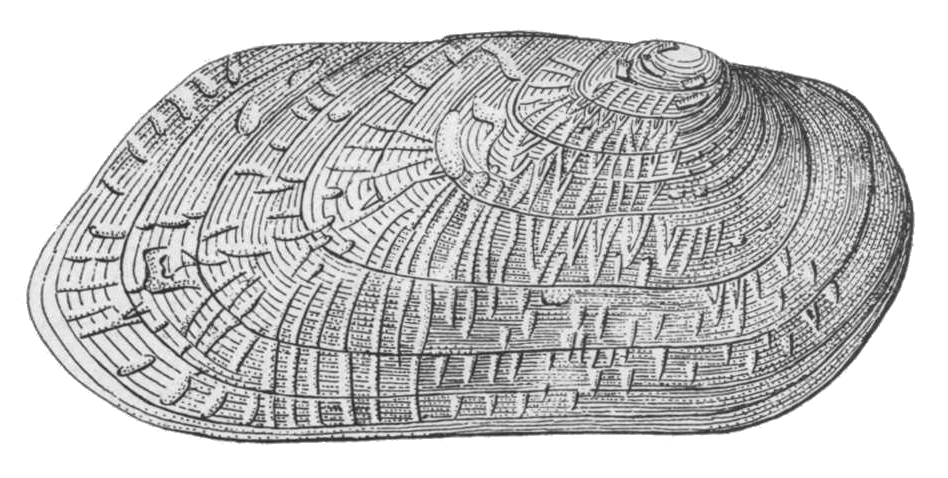
- Cucumerunio websteri

Scientific classification
- Kingdom: Animalia
- Phylum: Mollusca
- Class: Bivalvia
- Order: Unionida
- Family: Hyriidae
- Genus: Cucumerunio; Iredale, 1934

= Cucumerunio =

Genus of bivalves

Cucumerunio is a genus of bivalves belonging to the family Hyriidae.

The species of this genus are found in Australia.

Species:

- Cucumerunio novaehollandiae (Gray, 1834)
- Cucumerunio websteri (Simpson, 1902)
