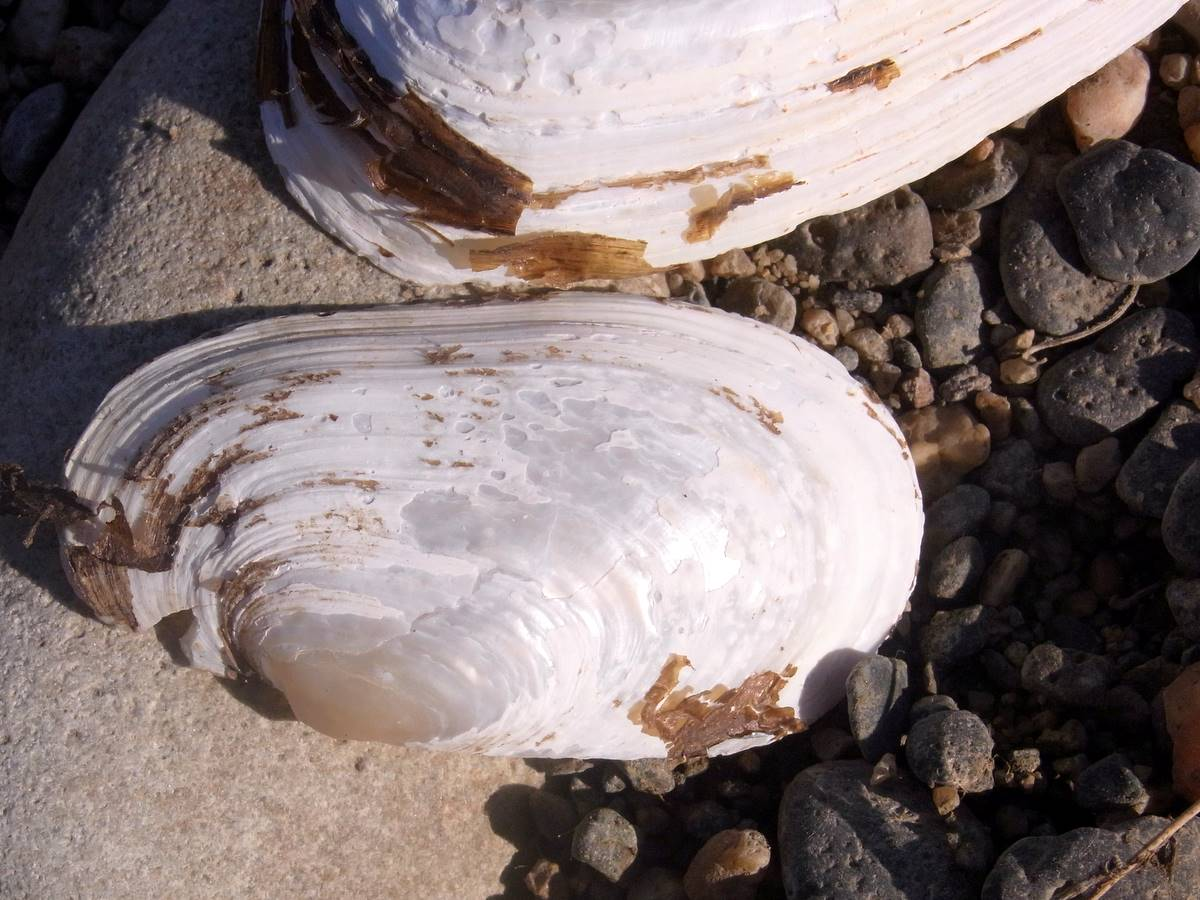
- Alathyria profuga

Scientific classification
- Domain: Eukaryota
- Kingdom: Animalia
- Phylum: Mollusca
- Class: Bivalvia
- Order: Unionida
- Family: Hyriidae
- Genus: Alathyria; Iredale, 1934

= Alathyria =

Genus of bivalves

Alathyria is a genus of bivalves belonging to the family Hyriidae.

The species of this genus are found in Australia.

Species:

- Alathyria condola Iredale, 1943
- Alathyria jacksoni Iredale, 1934
- Alathyria pertexta Iredale, 1934
- Alathyria profuga (Gould, 1850)
