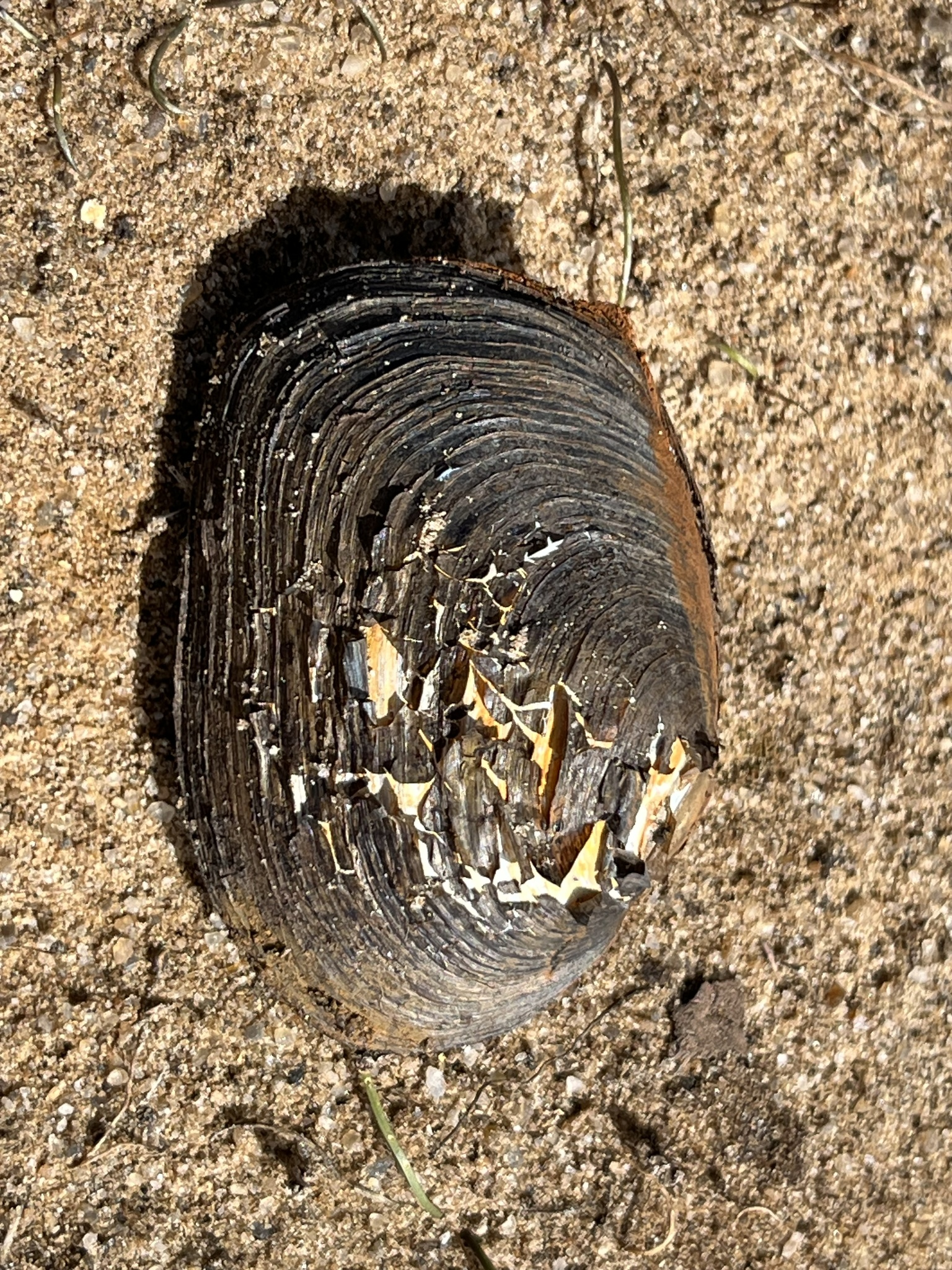
- Westralunio inbisi

Scientific classification
- Domain: Eukaryota
- Kingdom: Animalia
- Phylum: Mollusca
- Class: Bivalvia
- Order: Unionida
- Family: Hyriidae
- Subfamily: Velesunioninae
- Genus: Westralunio; Iredale, 1934

= Westralunio =

Genus of bivalves

Westralunio is a genus of freshwater mussels in the family Hyriidae.

There are 4 species:

- Westralunio albertisi Clench, 1957
- Westralunio carteri Iredale, 1934 – Carter's freshwater mussel
- Westralunio flyensis (Tapparone-Canefri, 1883)
- Westralunio inbisi Klunzinger, Whisson, Zieritz, J. A. Benson, B. A. Stewart & Kirkendale, 2022
