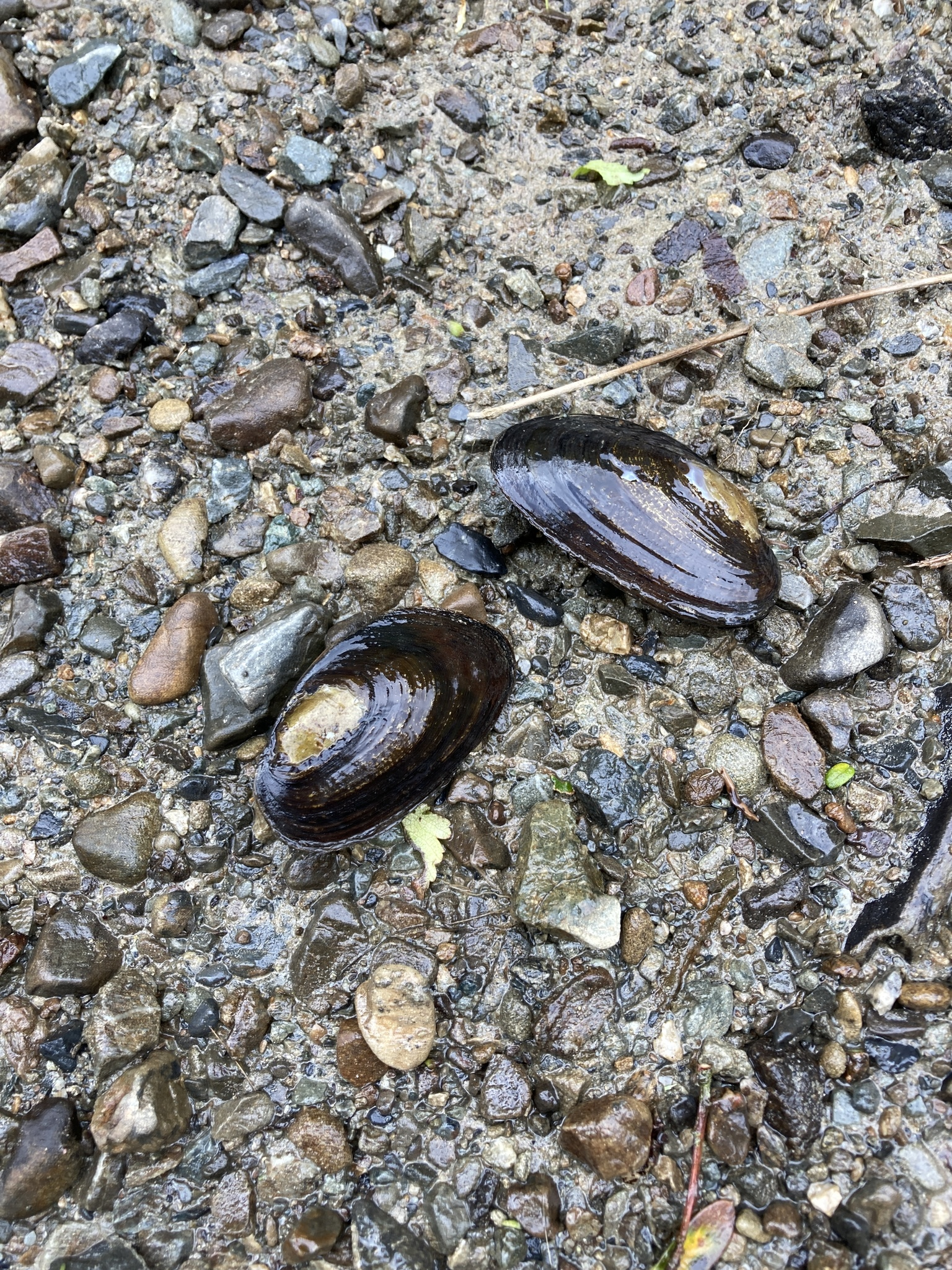
- Echyridella menziesii

Scientific classification
- Kingdom: Animalia
- Phylum: Mollusca
- Class: Bivalvia
- Order: Unionida
- Family: Unionidae
- Genus: Echyridella; McMichael & Hiscock, 1958

= Echyridella =

Genus of bivalves

Echyridella is a genus of freshwater mussels, aquatic bivalve mollusks in the family Unionidae, the river mussels. There are three recognised species in the genus, which all live in the waters of New Zealand. They are collectively known in Māori as kākahi.

== Species ==
- Echyridella aucklandica (Gray, 1843)
- Echyridella menziesii (Gray, 1843)
- Echyridella onekaka Fenwick & Marshall, 2006

== Gallery ==
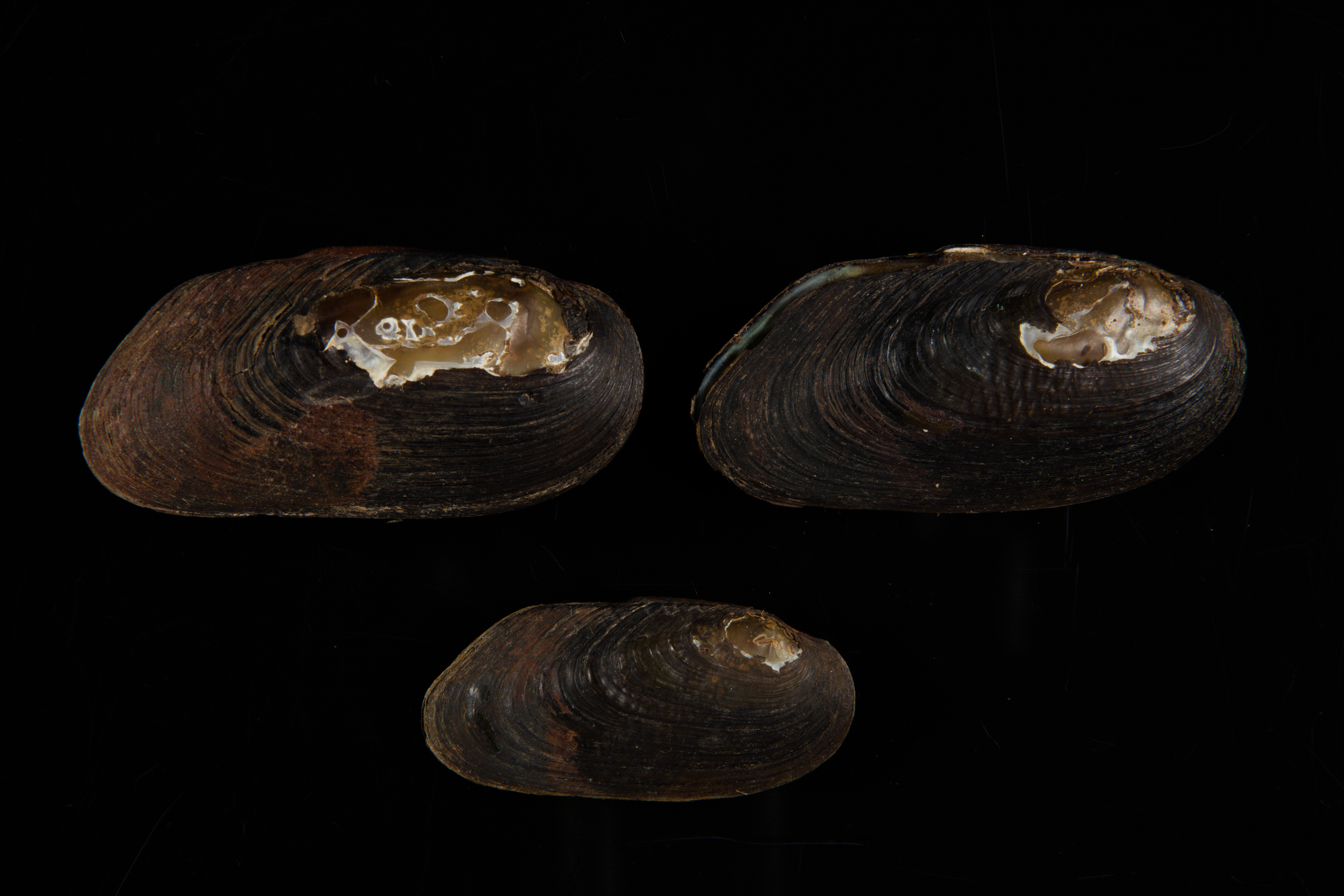
Echyridella aucklandica

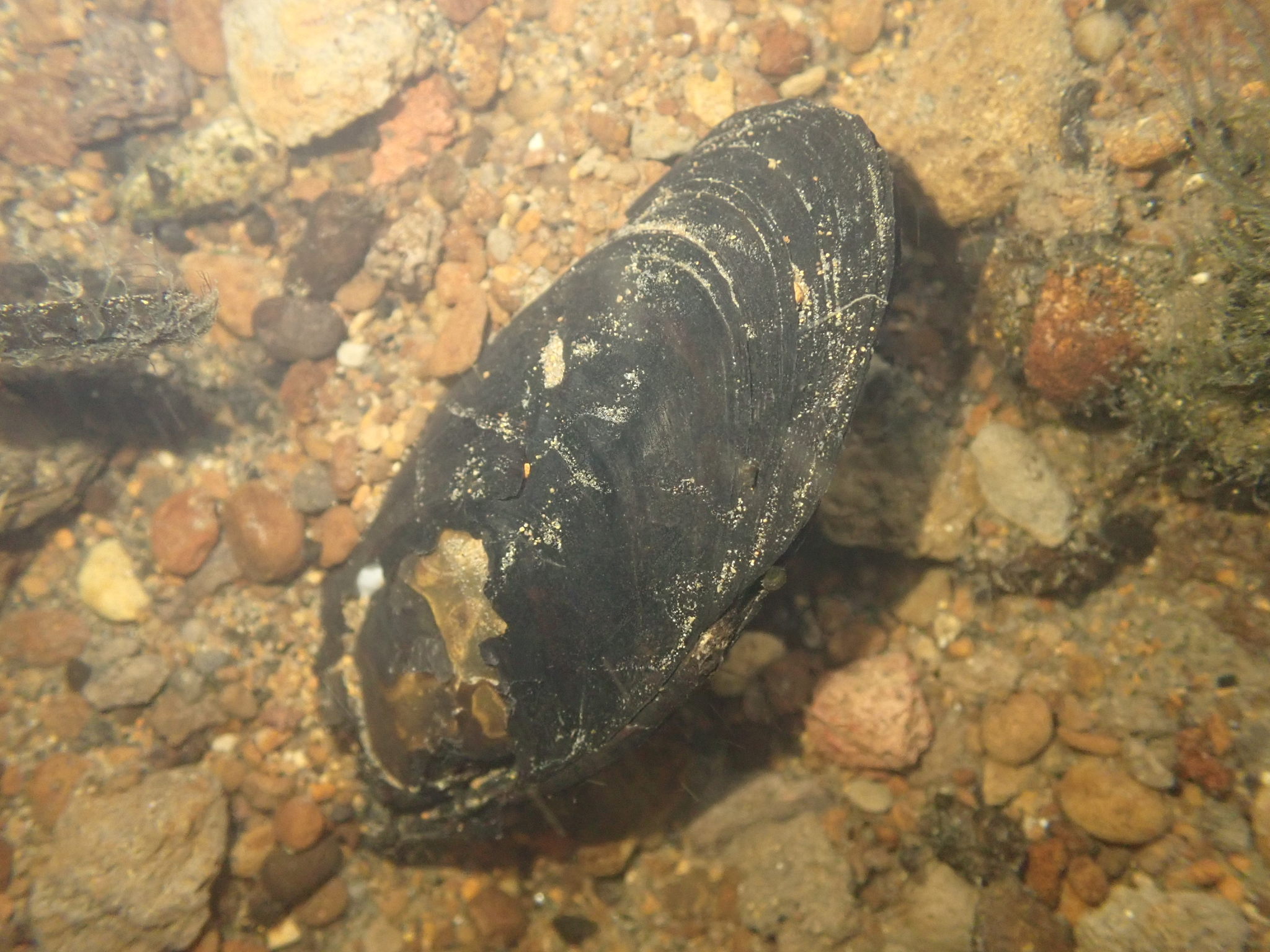
Echyridella menziesii

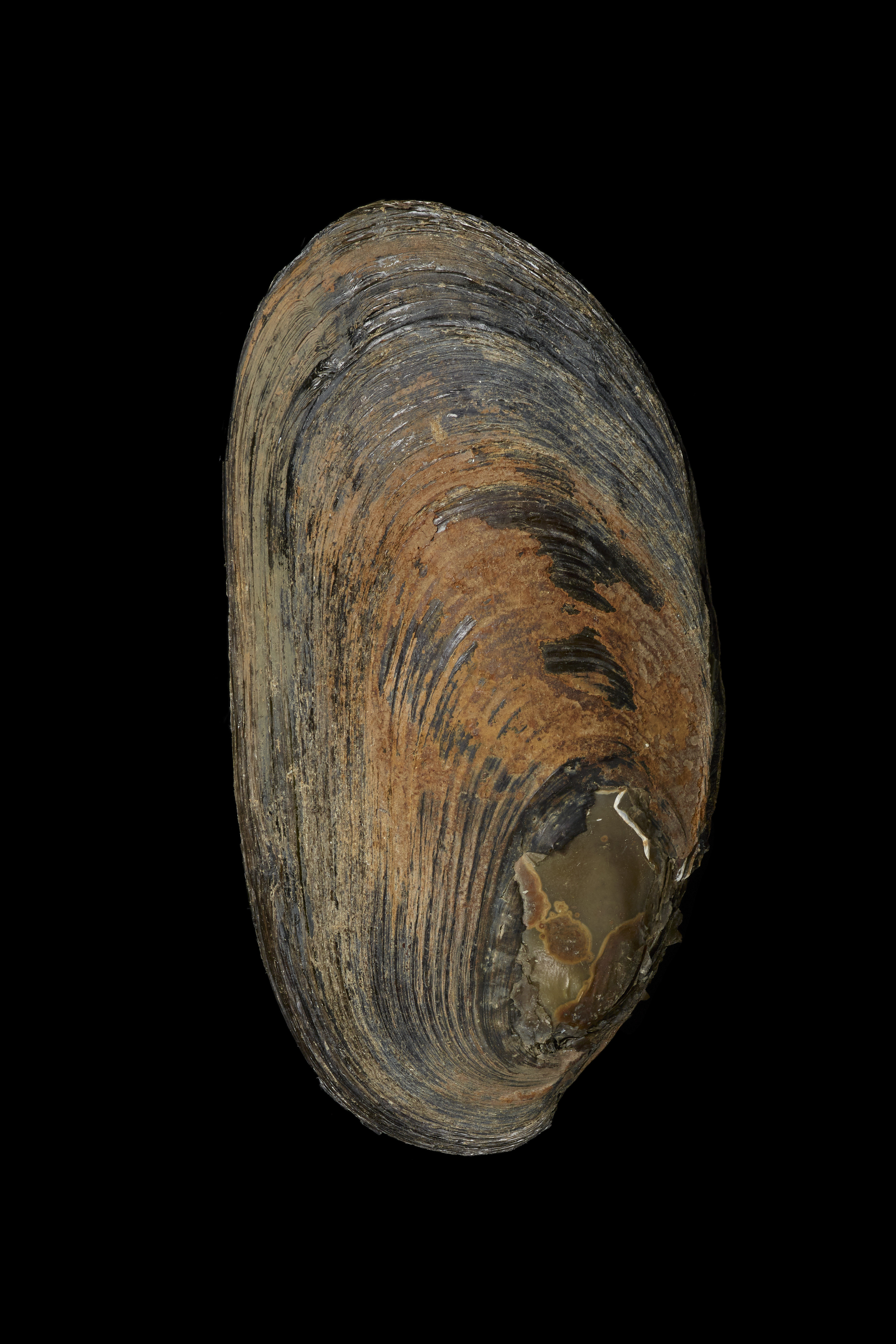
Echyridella onekaka
