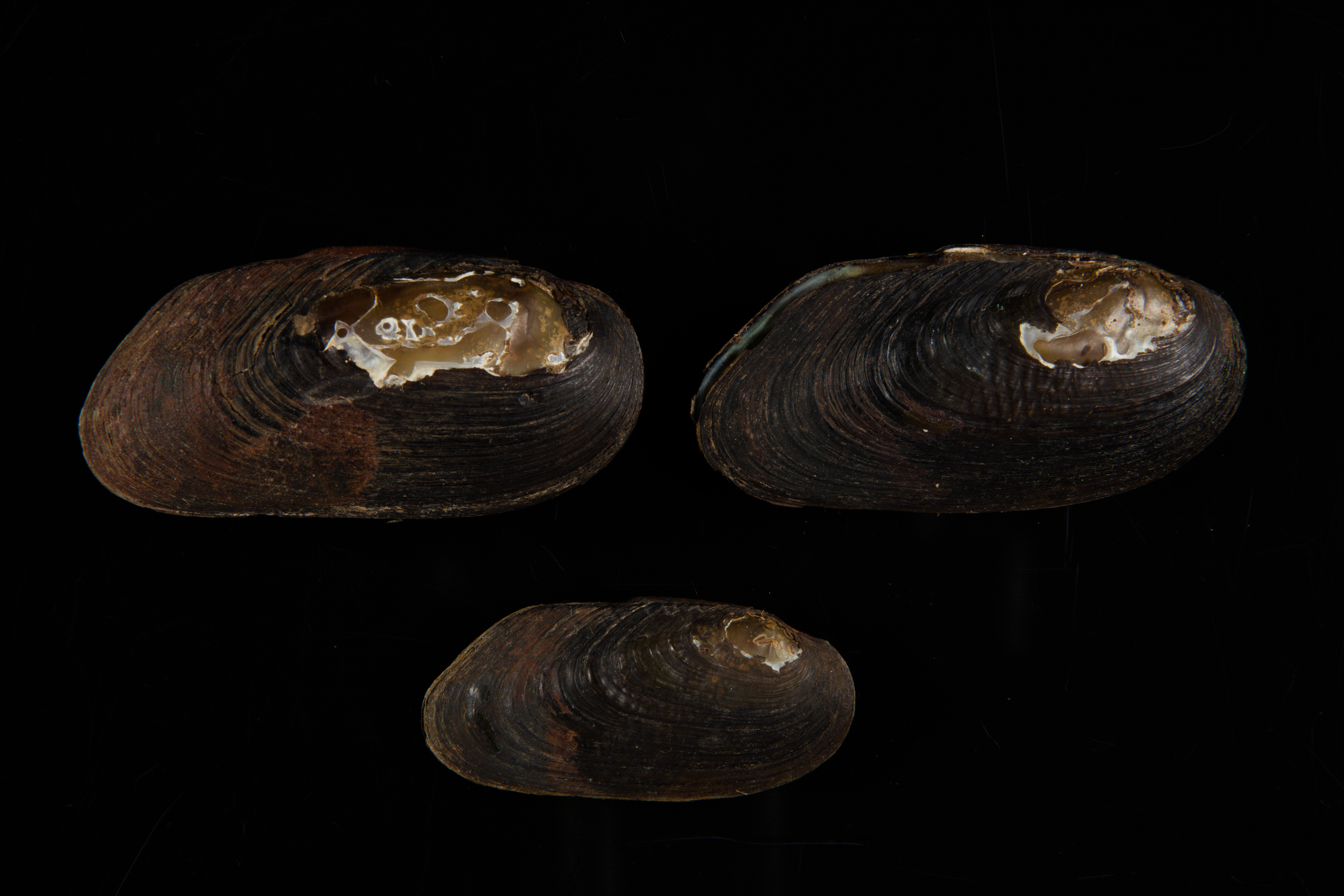

Conservation status
- Data Deficient (IUCN 3.1)

- Nationally Vulnerable (NZ TCS)

Scientific classification
- Kingdom: Animalia
- Phylum: Mollusca
- Class: Bivalvia
- Order: Unionida
- Family: Unionidae
- Genus: Echyridella
- Species: E. aucklandica

Binomial name
- Echyridella aucklandica (Gray, 1843)

Synonyms
- Cucumerunio websteri (C. T. Simpson, 1902); Cucumerunio websteri delli McMichael & Hiscock, 1958; Diplodon (Hyridella) menziesi lucasi Suter, 1905; Diplodon menziesii lucasi Suter, 1905; Diplodon websteri C. T. Simpson, 1902; Echyridella lucasi (Suter, 1905); Hyridella aucklandica (J. E. Gray, 1843); Unio aucklandicus J. E. Gray, 1843

= Echyridella aucklandica =

Species of bivalve

Echyridella aucklandica is a species of freshwater mussel endemic to New Zealand. E. aucklandica is an aquatic bivalve mollusc in the family Unionidae, the river mussels.

== Description ==
Echyridella aucklandica was first described by John Edward Gray in 1843 and given the name Unio aucklandicus. It was described again by American malacologist Charles Torrey Simpson in 1902, who used the name Diplodon websteri. Simpson's original text (the type description) reads as follows:

Diplodon websteri Simpson.

Shell long, rhomboid, compressed or subcompressed, inequilateral; beaks subcompressed, pointed, their sculpture apparently a few irregular lachrymose nodules arranged in a somewhat radial pattern; surface with uneven growth lines and impressed rest marks, sculptured throughout with lachrymose nodules which are often V-shaped, those along the upper part of the low posterior ridge slightly knobbed; epidermis dark olive green, clouded with lighter green, rather dull; pseudo-cardinals small, subcompressed, granulose, two in each valve; laterals straight, two in the left valve, one in the right; muscle scars small, shallow and irregular; nacre bluish,

lurid purple near and in the beak cavities, thicker in front.

The length of the shell is 62–81 mm. The height of the shell is 32–39 mm. The width of the shell is 14–20 mm.

== Distribution ==
Echyridella aucklandica is found in two separate locations, Southland and the lower North Island. This broken distribution may have come about due to transportation by Māori. It inhabits lakes and streams.

== Ecology ==
Like other unionids, E. aucklandica has a complex life-cycle characterised by a parasitic larval stage called glochidia that require a fish host to metamorphose into juveniles. Echyridella aucklandica glochidia attach themselves exclusively to the New Zealand smelt, unlike the more common Echyridella menziesii, which generalises to many different host species.
