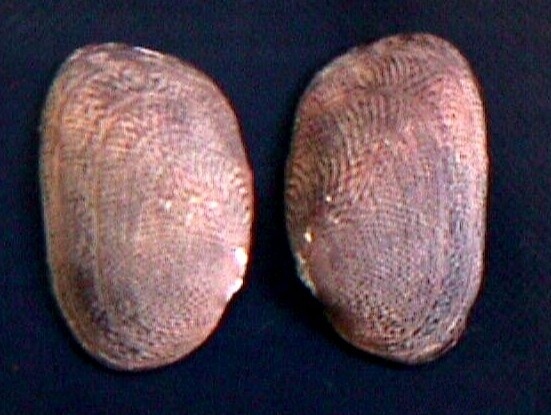
- External view of two valves of Diplodon granosus

Scientific classification
- Kingdom: Animalia
- Phylum: Mollusca
- Class: Bivalvia
- Order: Unionida
- Superfamily: Hyrioidea; Swainson, 1840
- Family: Hyriidae; Swainson, 1840

Genera
- See text

= Hyriidae =

Family of bivalves

Hyriidae is a taxonomic family of pearly freshwater mussels, aquatic bivalve molluscs in the order Unionida. This family is native to South America, Australia, New Zealand and New Guinea. Like all members of that order, they go through a larval stage that is parasitic on fish (see glochidium).

The classification recognized by Banarescu (1995) uses three subfamilies. This family contains eighteen genera.

== Subfamilies and genera ==
=== Hyriinae ===
Genera within the subfamily Hyriinae, from South America, include:

- Paxyodon
- Castalina
- Chevronaias

Tribe Castaliini

- Castalia
- Castaliella
- Callonaia

Tribe Hyriini

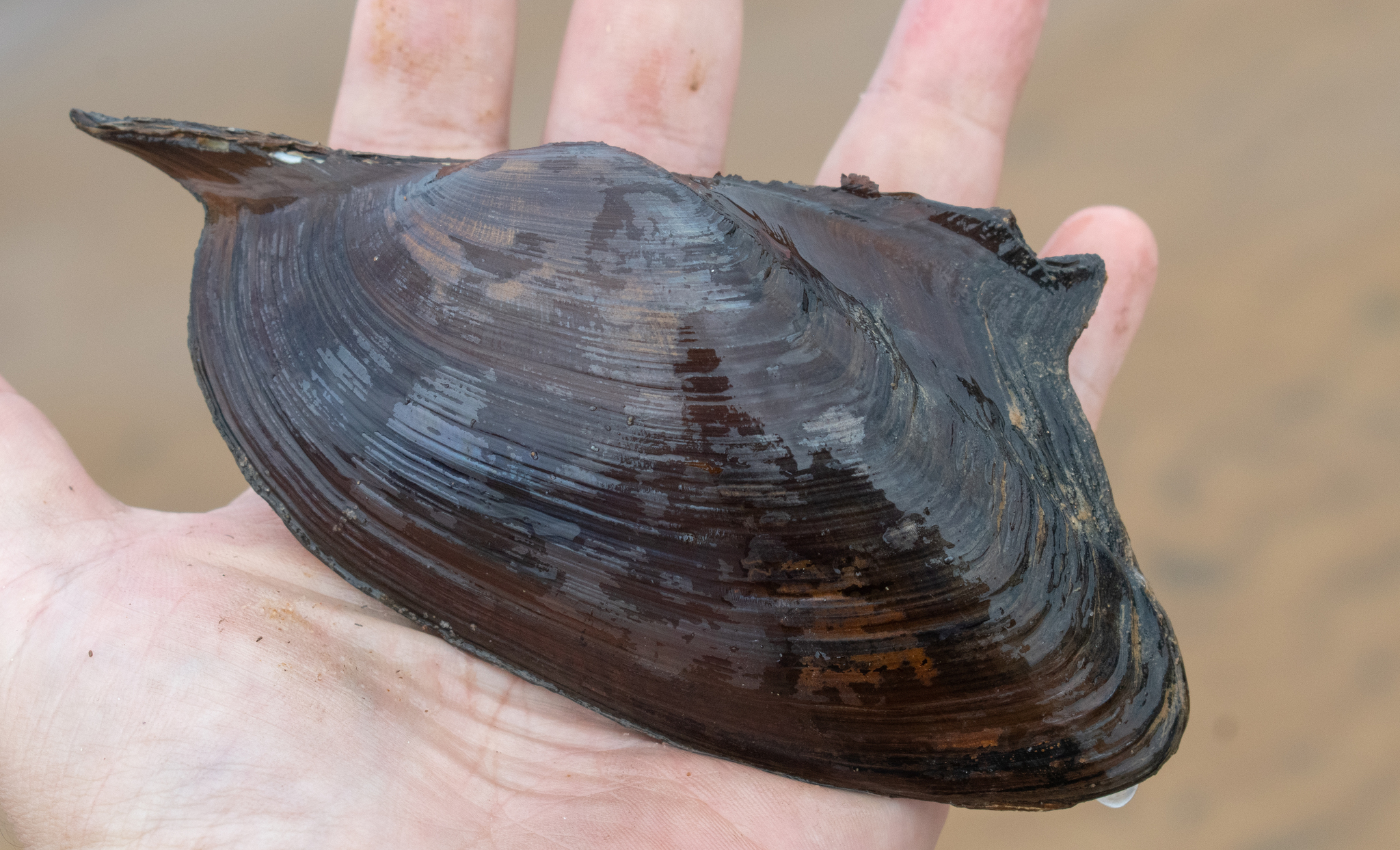
- Prisodon obliquus in Brazil
  Prisodon
- Triplodon

Tribe Rhipidodontini

- Diplodon

=== Cucumerunioninae ===
Genera within the subfamily Cucumerunioninae, from Australasia, include:

- Echyridella
- Cucumerunio
- Hyridella
- Virgus

=== Velesunioninae ===
Genera within the subfamily Velesunioninae, from Australasia, include:

- Alathyria
  - Alathyria jacksoni, the river mussel (or black river mussel) occurs in South Australia.
- Haasodonta
- Lortiella
- Microdonta
- Velesunio
- Westralunio
