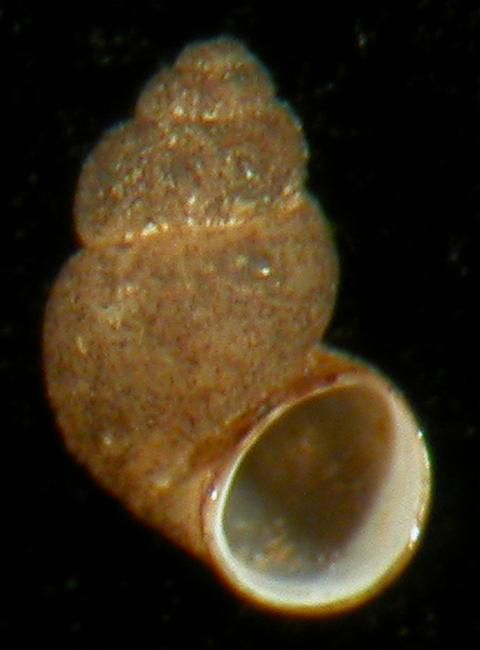
- AM C.203685

Scientific classification
- Kingdom: Animalia
- Phylum: Mollusca
- Class: Gastropoda
- Subclass: Caenogastropoda
- Order: Littorinimorpha
- Family: Tateidae
- Genus: Nanocochlea; Ponder & Clark, 1993

= Nanocochlea =

Genus of gastropods

Nanocochlea is a genus of minute freshwater snails with an operculum, aquatic gastropod mollusks in the family Tateidae. The genus was first described in 1993 by Winston Ponder and others. The type species is Nanocochlea monticola.

== Species ==
Species within the genus Nanocochlea include:

- Nanocochlea monticola
- Nanocochlea parva
- Nanocochlea pupoidea
