= Nanocochlea pupoidea =

Conservation status
- Vulnerable (IUCN 2.3)

Scientific classification
- Kingdom: Animalia
- Phylum: Mollusca
- Class: Gastropoda
- Subclass: Caenogastropoda
- Order: Littorinimorpha
- Family: Tateidae
- Genus: Nanocochlea
- Species: N. pupoidea

Binomial name
- Nanocochlea pupoidea Ponder & Clark, 1993

Species of gastropod

Nanocochlea pupoidea is a species of small freshwater snail with a gill and an operculum, an aquatic gastropod mollusk in the family Hydrobiidae. This species is endemic to Australia.
