= Horalabiosa =

Scientific classification
- Domain: Eukaryota
- Kingdom: Animalia
- Phylum: Chordata
- Class: Actinopterygii
- Order: Cypriniformes
- Family: Cyprinidae
- Subfamily: Labeoninae
- Genus: Horalabiosa; Silas, 1954

Type species
- Horalabiosa joshuai Silas, 1954

Genus of fishes

Horalabiosa is a disputed genus of cyprinid fish found only in India. There are currently two described species in this genus, although it is usually regarded as a synonym of Garra.

== Species ==
- Horalabiosa joshuai Silas, 1954
- Horalabiosa palaniensis Rema Devi & Menon, 1994
