= Garra kalpangi =

Scientific classification
- Kingdom: Animalia
- Phylum: Chordata
- Class: Actinopterygii
- Order: Cypriniformes
- Family: Cyprinidae
- Subfamily: Labeoninae
- Genus: Garra
- Species: G. kalpangi

Binomial name
- Garra kalpangi (Nebeshwar Sharma, Bagra & D. N. Das, 2012)

Species of fish

Garra kalpangi is a species of cyprinid fish in the genus Garra which is described from the Kalpangi River at Yachuli (Brahmaputra River system), Lower Subansiri District, Arunachal Pradesh, India.

== Description ==
The species is closely similar to G. gravelyi, G. rotundinasus and G.elongata in having a shared character i.e. a weakly developed proboscis. This species reaches a length of 7.2 cm (2.8 in).

== Etymology ==
Name is given as noun in apposition after the name of the River Kalpangi.
