= Garra typhlops =

Conservation status
- Vulnerable (IUCN 3.1)

Scientific classification
- Kingdom: Animalia
- Phylum: Chordata
- Class: Actinopterygii
- Order: Cypriniformes
- Family: Cyprinidae
- Subfamily: Labeoninae
- Genus: Garra
- Species: G. typhlops

Binomial name
- Garra typhlops (Bruun & E. W. Kaiser, 1944)

Synonyms
- Iranocypris typhlops Bruun & Kaiser, 1944

Species of fish

Garra typhlops, also known as the Iran cave barb, is a species of ray-finned fish in the family Cyprinidae. It is endemic to caves in Iran. Like other cave-adapted fish, it is blind and lacks pigmentation.

Three other cave-adapted fish species are known from Iran: Garra lorestanensis, G. tashanensis and the Zagroz blind loach (Eidinemacheilus smithi). In the general region there are three additional cavefish species, all Iraqi cypriniforms: Eidinemacheilus proudlovei, Caecocypris basimi, and Garra widdowsoni.
