= Mahi Kur Cave =

Cave in Iran

Mahi Kur Cave is a cave located in Lorestan province in Papi district, near a village called Levan. This cave is the only national natural monument of Lorestan province and was registered in 2006. There are two rare and unique specimens of blind fish in this cave that have not been found anywhere else in the world. These fish have no eyesight and are completely blind. They do not have any traces of outside eyes and are known as Garra typhlops since they live in groundwater and in dark caves.

== The discovery of Mahi Kur Cave ==
In 1930, two Danish naturalists came to Papi district with the executors of the Tehran-South Railway project. After investigating the tributaries of the Sirom River and Kairud Stream, they arrived at a water hole near the village of Levan and encountered with a type of blind fish. They took several specimens of the blind fish to their country and registered them as "Iranocypris" and apparently refuse to reveal the location of the fish.

On June 17, 1951, the research and exploration team of an English researcher named Anthony John Smith from Oxford University traveled to Iran to the city of Kerman to discover the location of the blind fish. But after three months he returned to England with no result. Twenty-six years later he realized the fish he was looking for is not in Kerman's aqueducts and is in the Zagros Mountains.

== Characteristics of blind fish in Mahi Kur ==
The home of this blind fish is in groundwater. Since the mouth of Mahi Kur cave is connected to the surface of the groundwater, it makes it possible for the blind fish to come close to the surface of the water during the nights. They are only seen during the hot days of the year near the earth's surface of water. The fish lives in the water temperature from 5 to 28 degrees Celsius.

== First specimen ==
The blind fish of the blind Persian cave, with the scientific name "Iranocypris typhlops" belongs to the common carp family.

== Second specimen ==
The blind fish with the scientific name of "Paracobits smithi" belongs to the stream of the Nemacheilus family. This type of fish, in addition to being deprived of eyes, does not have pigments or scales. It has three pairs of whiskers, the second pair of which grows well and reaches the end of the third pair. The average body length is reported to be 45 mm.

== Scientific and research value of blind fish ==
Blind fish have no economic value in terms of fisheries.

== The Access Path ==
Mahi Kur Cave is accessible both by road and by rail. Among the trains going to Lorestan, only the "normal" train of Tehran-Ahvaz and the "local" train of Doroud-Andimeshk stop at Tang-e haft station. Then from this station you have to walk to the north (parallel to the Caesar River) to the Sirom Bridge and then from there to the west (towards the villages of Levan and Lolri) until after about four hours of walking, you will reach the village of Levan and Mahi Kur Cave.
