= Garra dampaensis =

Scientific classification
- Kingdom: Animalia
- Phylum: Chordata
- Class: Actinopterygii
- Order: Cypriniformes
- Family: Cyprinidae
- Subfamily: Labeoninae
- Genus: Garra
- Species: G. dampaensis

Binomial name
- Garra dampaensis (Lalronunga, Lalnuntluanga & Lalramliana, 2013)

Species of fish

Garra dampaensis is a species of cyprinid fish in the genus Garra Known only from Seling River, inside Dampa Tiger Reserve, a tributary of Khawthlang Tuipui (Karnaphuli drainage) Mizoram, India.

== Etymology ==
The species is named after Dampa Tiger Reserve, Mizoram.
