= Garra waterloti =

Conservation status
- Least Concern (IUCN 3.1)

Scientific classification
- Kingdom: Animalia
- Phylum: Chordata
- Class: Actinopterygii
- Order: Cypriniformes
- Family: Cyprinidae
- Genus: Garra
- Species: G. waterloti

Binomial name
- Garra waterloti (Pellegrin, 1935)

Synonyms
- Discognathus waterloti Pellegrin, 1935; Garra dageti Monod, 1950

Species of fish

Garra ornata was frequently misidentified as G. waterloti.

Garra waterloti is a species of ray-finned fish in the genus Garra from west Africa.
