= Garra jordanica =

Scientific classification
- Kingdom: Animalia
- Phylum: Chordata
- Class: Actinopterygii
- Order: Cypriniformes
- Family: Cyprinidae
- Genus: Garra
- Species: G. jordanica

Binomial name
- Garra jordanica Hamidan, Geiger, & Freyhof, 2014

Species of fish

Garra jordanica is a species of ray-finned fish in the family Cyprinidae. This small fish, up to 10 cm (4 in) in standard length, is found in the northern Dead Sea basin, including the Jordan River system and Lake Kinneret, in Israel, Jordan and Syria. Populations in the coastal rivers of Kishon, Daliyya, and Taninnim have not been studied in detail, but may also be this species. In the past all these populations were included in G. rufa. Since the "G. rufa" seen in the aquarium and spa trade mostly are of Israeli origin, this leads to questions over their true identity. In the southern Dead Sea basin G. jordanica is replaced by the much rarer G. ghorensis.
