= Garra klatti =

Conservation status
- Endangered (IUCN 3.1)

Scientific classification
- Kingdom: Animalia
- Phylum: Chordata
- Class: Actinopterygii
- Division: Teleostei
- Order: Cypriniformes
- Family: Cyprinidae
- Genus: Garra
- Species: G. klatti

Binomial name
- Garra klatti (Kosswig, 1950)

Synonyms
- Tylognathus klatti Kosswig, 1950; Crossocheilus klatti (Kosswig, 1950)

Species of fish

Garra klatti, also known as the Isparta minnow or Anatolian golden barb, is a species of ray-finned fish in the genus Garra.

In FishBase it is placed in the genus Crossocheilus, which according to Jörg Freyhof is a purely East Asian genus. He suggests the species is close to Hemigrammocapoeta kemali, but the genus Hemigrammocapoeta should be considered part of the genus Garra. Eschmeyer's authoritative Catalog of Fishes treats the species as Garra klatti.

The type locality is Lake Eğirdir (Turkey) where the fish was found in the mid-20th century. It is now considered extirpated in this lake and in Lake Gölcük. The known distribution is restricted to Lake Işıklı basin in the Büyük Menderes drainage.
