= Garra longipinnis =

Conservation status
- Data Deficient (IUCN 3.1)

Scientific classification
- Kingdom: Animalia
- Phylum: Chordata
- Class: Actinopterygii
- Order: Cypriniformes
- Family: Cyprinidae
- Subfamily: Labeoninae
- Genus: Garra
- Species: G. longipinnis

Binomial name
- Garra longipinnis Banister & M. A. Clarke, 1977

Species of fish

Garra longipinnis is a cyprinid fish only found in Oman. It is unclear whether this is a different species from Garra barreimiae. No specimens have been found since 1968, and its taxonomic and conservation status could not be confirmed.
