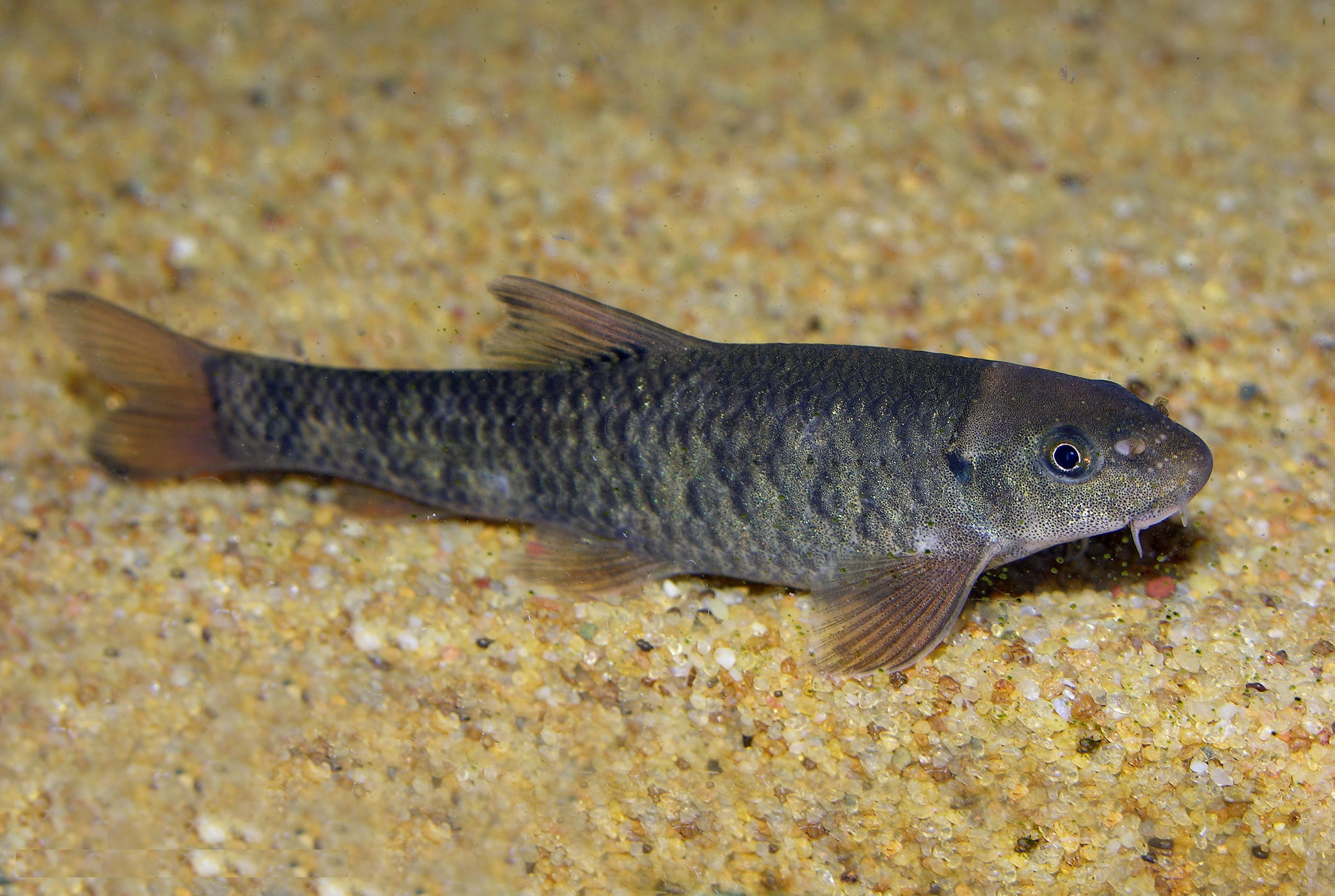
- Doctor fish (Garra rufa)

Scientific classification
- Kingdom: Animalia
- Phylum: Chordata
- Class: Actinopterygii
- Order: Cypriniformes
- Family: Cyprinidae
- Subfamily: Labeoninae
- Genus: Garra; F. Hamilton, 1822

Type species
- Cyprinus (Garra) lamta F. Hamilton, 1822

Synonyms
- Ageneiogarra Garman, 1912; Brachygramma Day, 1865; Discognathichthys Bleeker, 1860; Discognathus Heckel, 1843; Hemigrammocapoeta Pellegrin, 1927; Iranocypris Bruun & Kaiser, 1944; Lissorhynchus Bleeker, 1860; Mayoa Day, 1870; Phreatichthys Vinciguerra, 1924; Platycara McClelland, 1838; Tylognathoides Tortonese, 1938 Typhlogarra Trevawas, 1955

= Garra =

Genus of fishes

Garra is a genus of fish in the family Cyprinidae. These fish are one example of the "log suckers", sucker-mouthed barbs and other cyprinids commonly kept in aquaria to keep down algae. The doctor fish of Anatolia and the Middle East belongs in this genus. The majority of the more than 160 species of garras are native to Asia, but about one-fifth of the species are from Africa (East, Middle and West, but by far the highest species richness in Ethiopia).

== Description and ecology ==
These species are slim cyprinids with a flat belly and a sucking mouth; their shape indicates that they are at least in tendency rheophilic. They are distinguished from other cyprinids by a combination of features: As in their closest relatives, their lower lip is expanded at its posterior rim to form a round or oval sucking pad, the vomero-palatine organ is much reduced or completely lost, the pectoral fins have at least the first two rays enlarged and usually unbranched, the supraethmoid is wider than long when seen from above, and the cleithrum is narrow and elongated to the front.

From other Garrini (or Garraina), the genus Garra can be distinguished as follows: their pharyngeal teeth are arranged in three rows (like 2,4,5–5,4,2), the dorsal fin has 10 or 11 rays and starts slightly anterior to the pelvic fins, while the anal fin starts well behind the pelvic fins and has 8 or 9 rays. As far as is known, the diploid karyotype of garras is 2n = 50.

Garras are not or barely noticeably sexually dimorphic and generally cryptically coloured benthic freshwater fish. Six species in the genus (G. andruzzii, G. dunsirei, G. lorestanensis, G. tashanensis, G. typhlops and some populations of G. barreimiae) are cave-adapted, lacking pigmentation and/or eyes. Garras are omnivorous, eating alga, plankton and small invertebrates that they suck off substrate like rocks or logs. The food is scraped off with the sharp keratinized borders of the jaws and ingested via suction, created by contracting and relaxing the buccopharynx. As typical for Cypriniformes, the garras lack a stomach entirely, their oesophagus leading directly to the sphincter of the intestine. Different Garra species eat animal and vegetable matter in different proportions, which can – as typical for vertebrates – usually be recognized by the length of their intestine compared to related species: more herbivorous species have a longer intestine. Indeed, intestinal length in this genus is remarkably constant within species and varies a lot between species, meaning that it is useful to distinguish species and that dietary shifts have played a significant role in the evolution of garras.

When the females are ready to spawn, they are markedly plump and swollen; the ripe roe may fill almost four-fifths of their body cavity. The testicles of reproductive males are large too. The average Garra egg is 1.77 mm in diameter and a clutch contains several hundred eggs – up to a thousand or so in large females. The breeding behaviour is generally not well known and breeding is not often achieved in the aquarium; presumably, like many of their relatives they migrate upstream or (if they otherwise inhabit lakes) into the rivers to spawn.

== Taxonomy ==
The genus was established by Francis Buchanan-Hamilton in 1822 as a subgenus of Cyprinus (which at that time was a "basket genus" for carp-like cyprinids); he did not designate a type species, though as the only member of this subgenus was Garra lamta it became the type species of the genus after Pieter Bleeker did a taxonomic revision in 1863. The garras and their closest relatives are sometimes placed in a subfamily Garrinae, but this seems hardly warranted. More often, this group is included in the Labeoninae, or together with these in the Cyprininae. In the former case, the garras are members of the labeonine tribe Garrini, in the latter they are in the subtribe Garraina of tribe Labeonini. The genus Discogobio was considered a close relative, but this is no longer thought to be the case.

=== Phylogeny ===
The following maximum likelihood phylogenetic tree is based on a dataset of nuclear and mitochondrial DNA, from Yang et al. 2012, with updated binomial names:

- Garraina
  - - - Ceratogarra fasciacauda
      - Ceratogarra cambodgiensis
    - Paracrossochilus vittatus
  - - - - Tariqilabeo latius
        - Tariqilabeo diplochilus
      - - Tariqilabeo burmanicus
        - Tariqilabeo bicornis
    - ⊞Garra sensu stricto
      ⊟
      - Garra tengchongensis
      - - - Garra flavatra
          - Garra lissorhynchus
        - - - Garra spilota
            - - Garra sp. Nepal2
              - - Garra sp. Nepal1
                - Garra kempi
          - - - - Garra bicornuta
                - Garra joshuai
              - - Garra cf. annandalei
                - - Garra variabilis
                  - - Garra ceylonensis
                    - Garra mullya
            - - Garra gotyla
              - - - Garra fuliginosa
                  - - Garra orientalis
                    - - Garra mirofrontis
                      - Garra cyrano
                - - - Garra nasuta
                    - Garra lamta
                  - - Garra andruzzii
                    - - Garra makiensis
                      - - - Garra rufa
                          - Garra barreimiae
                        - - - Garra waterloti
                            - - Garra congoensis
                              - Garra ornata
                          - - Garra tana
                            - - Garra dembecha
                              - Garra regressa

"Garra" imberba and "G." micropulvinus were recovered in a more derived position than Garra sensu stricto; the two were recovered within the same clade as Discogobio and Pseudocrossocheilus, so they were subsequently reassigned to new genera.

=== Species ===
These are the currently recognized species in this genus:

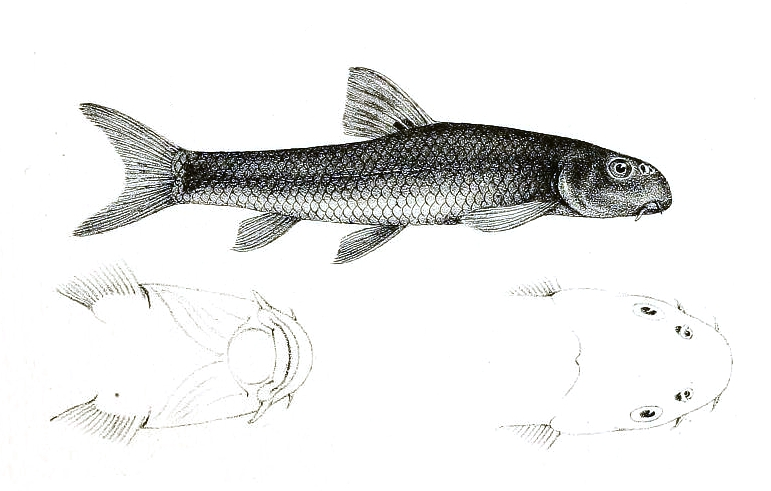
Garra blanfordii

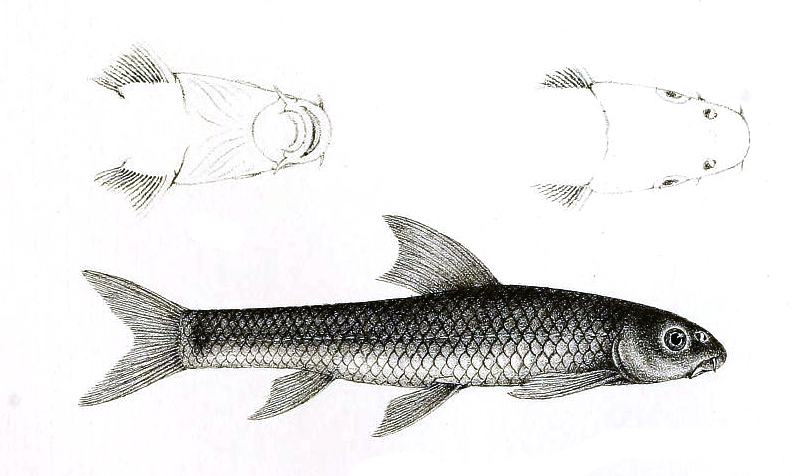
Garra makiensis

- Garra abhoyai Hora, 1921
- Garra aethiopica (Pellegrin, 1927)
- Garra allostoma T. R. Roberts, 1990
- Garra alticaputus Arunachalam, Nandagopal & Mayden, 2013
- Garra alticauda L. Cao, Nyingi, Bart & E. Zhang, 2023
- Garra amirhosseini Esmaeili, Sayyadzadeh, Coad & Eagderi, 2016
- Garra andruzzii (Vinciguerra, 1924) (Somalian cavefish)
- Garra annandalei Hora, 1921
- Garra apogon (Norman, 1925)
- Garra arunachalami J. J. Johnson & R. Soranam, 2001
- Garra arunachalensis Nebeshwar & Vishwanath, 2013
- Garra arupi Nebeshwar, Vishwanath & D. N. Das, 2009
- Garra barreimiae Fowler & Steinitz, 1956
- Garra bicornuta Narayan Rao, 1920
- Garra biloborostris Roni & Vishwanath, 2017
- Garra bimaculacauda Thoni, Gurung & Mayden, 2016
- Garra binduensis U. Das, Kosygin & Panigrahi, 2016
- Garra birostris Nebeshwar & Vishwanath, 2013
- Garra bispinosa E. Zhang, 2005
- Garra blanfordii (Boulenger, 1901)
- Garra borneensis (Vaillant, 1902)
- Garra bourreti (Pellegrin, 1928)
- Garra buettikeri Krupp, 1983
- Garra caudomaculata (Battalgil, 1942) (Antakya minnow)
- Garra centrala V. H. Nguyễn, T.H.N. Vũ & T.D.P. Nguyễn, 2015
- Garra ceylonensis Bleeker, 1863 (Ceylon logsucker)
- Garra chakpiensis Nebeshwar & Vishwanath, 2015
- Garra chathensis Ezung, Shangningam & Pankaj, 2020
- Garra chaudhurii Hora, 1921
- Garra chebera Habteselassie, Mikschi, Ahnelt & Waidbacher, 2010
- Garra chindwinensis Premananda, Kosygin, Saidullah, 2017
- Garra chingaiensis Abonmai, Linthoingambi, Ngangbam, Thoidingjam & K. R. Singh, 2023
- Garra chivaensis Moyon & L. Arunkumar, 2020
- Garra clavirostris Roni, Sarbojit & Vishwanath, 2017
- Garra compressa Kosygin & Vishwanath, 1998
- Garra congoensis Poll, 1959
- Garra cornigera Shangningam & Vishwanath, 2015
- Garra culiciphaga (Pellegrin, 1927) (Redstripe barb)
- Garra cyclostomata Đ. Y. Mai, 1978
- Garra cyrano Kottelat, 2000
- Garra dampaensis Lalronunga, Lalnuntluanga & Lalramliana, 2013
- Garra deccanensis Jadhav, Karuthapandi, Shangningam, Jaiswal & Shankar, 2022
- Garra dembecha Getahun & Stiassny, 2007
- Garra dembeensis (Rüppell, 1835) (Dembea stone lapper)
- Garra dengba S.-Q. Deng, L. Cao & E. Zhang, 2018
- Garra dohjei Marngar, Mawlong & Lokeshwor, 2024
- Garra dulongensis (Chen, X. F. Pan, X. Hong & J. X. Yang, 2006)
- Garra dunsirei Banister, 1987
- Garra duobarbis Getahun & Stiassny, 2007
- Garra elegans (Günther, 1868)
- Garra elongata Vishwanath & Kosygin, 2000
- Garra emarginata Kurup & Radhakrishnan, 2011
- Garra ethelwynnae Menon, 1958
- Garra festai (Tortonese, 1939)
- Garra flavatra S. O. Kullander & F. Fang, 2004
- Garra fluviatilis Kangrang, Thoni, Mayden & Beamish, 2016
- Garra fuliginosa Fowler, 1934
- Garra gallagheri Krupp, 1988 (Black Garra)
- Garra geba Getahun & Stiassny, 2007
- Garra ghorensis Krupp, 1982
- Garra gotyla (J. E. Gray, 1830) (Sucker head)
- Garra gracilis (Pellegrin & Chevey, 1936)
- Garra gravelyi (Annandale, 1919)
- Garra gymnothorax Berg, 1949 (Chest scaleless garra)
- Garra hexagonarostris Nebeshwar, Rameshori & Prabina, 2024
- Garra hindii (Boulenger, 1905)
- Garra hormuzensis Zamani-Faradonbe, E. Zhang & Keivany, 2021
- Garra hughi Silas, 1955
- Garra ignestii (Gianferrari, 1925)
- Garra imberbis (Vinciguerra, 1890)
- Garra irangensis Premananda, 2023
- Garra jaldhakaensis Kosygin, Shangningam, Singh & U. Das, 2021
- Garra jamila Moritz, Straube & Neumann, 2019
- Garra jenkinsonianum Hora, 1921
- Garra jerdoni F. Day, 1867
- Garra jordanica Hamidan, Geiger & Freyhof, 2014
- Garra joshuai (Silas, 1954)
- Garra kalakadensis Rema Devi, 1993
- Garra kalpangi Nebeshwar, Bagra & D. N. Das, 2012
- Garra kangrae Prashad, 1919
- Garra kemali (Hankó, 1925) (Eregil minnow)
- Garra kempi Hora, 1921
- Garra khawbungi Arunachalam, Nandagopal & Mayden, 2014
- Garra kimini Arunachalam, Nandagopal & Mayden, 2014
- Garra klatti (Kosswig, 1950)
- Garra koladynensis Nebeshwar & Vishwanath, 2017
- Garra laishrami Surachita, Chowdhury & Palita, 2023
- Garra lamta (F. Hamilton, 1822)
- Garra lancrenonensis Blache & Miton, 1960
- Garra langlungensis Ezung, Shangningam & Pankaj, 2021
- Garra lautior Banister, 1987
- Garra lissorhynchus (McClelland, 1842)
- Garra litanensis Vishwanath, 1993
- Garra longchuanensis Q. Yu, X. Z. Wang, H. Xiong & S. P. He, 2016
- Garra longipinnis Banister & M. A. Clarke, 1977
- Garra lorestanensis Mousavi-Sabet & Eagderi, 2016
- Garra lungongza Ngangbam & Lithoingambi, 2023
- Garra magnacavus Shangningam, Kosygin & Sinha, 2019
- Garra magnidiscus Tamang, 2013
- Garra makiensis (Boulenger, 1904)
- Garra mamshuqa Krupp, 1983
- Garra manipurensis Vishwanath & Sarojnalini, 1988
- Garra matensis Nebeshwar & Vishwanath, 2017
- Garra mcclellandi (Jerdon, 1849)
- Garra menderesensis (Küçük, Bayçelebi, Güçlü & Gülle, 2015)
- Garra menoni Rema Devi & T. J. Indra, 1984
- Garra meymehensis Zamani-Faradonbe, Keivany, Dorafshan & E. Zhang, 2021
- Garra mini Rahman, Mollah, Norén & S. O. Kullander, 2016
- Garra minibarbata L. Cao, Nyingi, Bart & E. Zhang 2023
- Garra minimus Arunachalam, Nandagopal & Mayden, 2013
- Garra mirofrontis X. L. Chu & G. H. Cui, 1987
- Garra mlapparaensis Kurup & Radhakrishnan, 2011
- Garra mondica Sayyadzadeh, Esmaeili & Freyhof, 2015
- Garra montisalsi Hora, 1921
- Garra motuoensis Z. Gong, Freyhof, J. Wang, M. Liu, F. Liu, P. C. Lin, Y. Jiang & H. Z. Liu 2018
- Garra moyonkhulleni Moyon & Arunkumar, 2018
- Garra mullya (Sykes, 1839) (sucker fish)
- Garra naganensis Hora, 1921
- Garra nambulica Vishwanath & Joyshree, 2005r.
- Garra namyaensis Shangningam & Vishwanath, 2012
- Garra nana (Heckel, 1843)
- Garra napata Moritz, Straube & Neumann, 2019
- Garra nasuta (McClelland, 1838)
- Garra nepalensis Rayamajhi & Arunachalam, 2017
- Garra nethravathiensis Arunachalam & Nandagopal, 2014
- Garra ngatangkha Arunkumar & Moyon, 2019
- Garra ngopi Tenali, Chandran, R. K. Singh & Sarkar, 2024
- Garra nigricauda Arunachalam, Nandagopal & Mayden, 2013
- Garra nigricollis S. O. Kullander & F. Fang, 2004
- Garra notata (Blyth, 1860)
- Garra nudiventris (Berg, 1905)
- Garra orientalis Nichols, 1925
- Garra ornata (Nichols & Griscom, 1917)
- Garra orontesi Bayçelebi, Kaya, Turan & Freyhof, 2021
- Garra palaniensis (Rema Devi & Menon, 1994)
- Garra palaruvica Arunachalam, Raja, Nandagopal & Mayden, 2013
- Garra panitvongi Tangjitjaroen, Z. S. Randall, Tongnunui, Boyd & Page, 2023
- Garra paralissorhynchus Vishwanath & K. Shanta Devi, 2005
- Garra parastenorhynchus Thoni, Gurung & Mayden, 2016
- Garra paratrilobata Roni, Chinglemba, Rameshori & Vishwanath, 2019
- Garra periyarensis K. C. Gopi, 2001
- Garra persica Berg, 1914
- Garra phewakholaensis Limbu, Rajbanshi & Raza 2024
- Garra phillipsi Deraniyagala, 1933 (Phillips's garra)
- Garra platycephala Narayan Rao, 1920
- Garra poecilura S. O. Kullander & F. Fang 2004
- Garra poilanei Petit & T. L. Tchang, 1933
- Garra prashadi Hora, 1921
- Garra propulvinus S. O. Kullander & F. Fang 2004
- Garra qiaojiensis H. W. Wu & Yao, 1977
- Garra quadratirostris Nebeshwar & Vishwanath, 2013
- Garra quadrimaculata (Rüppell 1835)
- Garra quangtriensis V. H. Nguyễn, T.H.N. Vũ & T. D. P. Nguyễn, 2015
- Garra rakhinica S. O. Kullander & F. Fang 2004
- Garra ranganensis Tamang, Sinha, Abujam & Kumar, 2019
- Garra regressa Getahun & Stiassny, 2007
- Garra rezai Mousavi-Sabet, Eagderi, Saemi-Komsari, Kaya & Freyhof, 2022
- Garra rhynchota Koller, 1926
- Garra robertsi Thoni & Mayden, 2015
- Garra roseae Mousavi-Sabet, Saemi-Komsari, Doadrio & Freyhof, 2019
- Garra rossica (A. M. Nikolskii, 1900)
- Garra rotundinasus E. Zhang, 2006
- Garra rufa (Heckel, 1843) (Red garra)
- Garra rupecula (McClelland, 1839)
- Garra sahilia Krupp, 1983
- Garra salweenica Hora & Mukerji, 1934
- Garra sannarensis Moritz, Straube & Neumann, 2019
- Garra sauvagei (Lortet, 1883)
- Garra shamal Kirchner, Kruckenhauser, Pichler, Borkenhagen & Freyhof, 2020
- Garra sharq Kirchner, Kruckenhauser, Pichler, Borkenhagen & Freyhof, 2020
- Garra simbalbaraensis Rath, Shangningam & Kosygin, 2019
- Garra sindhi Lyon, Geiger & Freyhof, 2016.
- Garra songbangensis V. H. Nguyễn, T.H.N. Vũ & T. D. P. Nguyễn, 2015
- Garra spilota S. O. Kullander & F. Fang, 2004
- Garra stenorhynchus Jerdon, 1849
- Garra substrictorostris Roni & Vishwanath, 2018
- Garra surendranathanii C. P. Shaji, L. K. Arun & P. S. Easa, 1996
- Garra surgifrons W. Zhou & C. Sun, 2018
- Garra surinbinnani Page, Ray, Tongnunui, Boyd & Randall, 2019
- Garra tamangi Gurumayum & Kosygin, 2016
- Garra tana Getahun & Stiassny, 2007
- Garra tashanensis Mousavi-Sabet, Vatandoust, Fatemi & Eagderi, 2016
- Garra tengchongensis E. Zhang & Y. Y. Chen, 2002
- Garra tezuensis Thoidingjam, Ngangbam, Linthoingambi & Kh. R. Singh, 2023
- Garra tiam Zamani-Faradonbe, Keivany, Dorafshan & E. Zhang, 2021
- Garra tibanica Trewavas, 1941
- Garra tibetana G. Zheng; S. Q. Deng; J. Wang; H. Z. Lui, 2018
- Garra trewavasae Monod, 1950
- Garra triangularis Shangningam, Rath & Kosygin, 2021
- Garra trilobata Shangningam & Vishwanath, 2015
- Garra turcica Karaman 1971
- Garra typhlops (Bruun & E. W. Kaiser, 1944) (Iran cave barb)
- Garra ukhrulensis Nebeshwar & Vishwanath, 2015
- Garra variabilis (Heckel, 1843) (Variable garra)
- Garra vinciguerrae (Boulenger 1901) (Cameroon logsucker)
- Garra waensis Lothongkham, Arbsuwan & Musikasinthorn, 2014
- Garra wanae (Regan, 1914)
- Garra waterloti (Pellegrin, 1936)
- Garra widdowsoni (Trewavas, 1955) (Iraq blind barb)
- Garra yajiangensis Gong, Freyhof, Wang, Liu, Liu, Lin, Jiang & Liu, 2018
- Garra zubzaensis Tenali, Shangningam, Bhattacharjee, Patel & Kosygin, 2024
