= Garra panitvongi =

Scientific classification
- Kingdom: Animalia
- Phylum: Chordata
- Class: Actinopterygii
- Order: Cypriniformes
- Family: Cyprinidae
- Genus: Garra
- Species: G. panitvongi

Binomial name
- Garra panitvongi Tangjitjaroen, Z. S. Randall, Tongnunui, Boyd & Page, 2023

Species of fish

Garra panitvongi, the redtail garra, is a species of ray-finned fish in the family Cyprinidae found in the Ataran River drainage and native to the Salween River basin in Thailand and Myanmar. After previously being popular in the pet trade, it was described to science as a new species in 2023.

== Description ==
Garra panitvongi is a small fish growing to around 92 millimeters (3.6 inches) in length. It is distinguishable from other members of its genus through its red-orange body and caudal fin coloration, as well as a protuberance above the mouth with a blue stripe on each side forming a "V" shape.

== Etymology ==
The specific name, panitvongi, is in honor of Thai professor Nonn Panitvong, who wrote A Photographic Guide to Freshwater Fishes of Thailand.

== Taxonomic evaluation ==
Garra panitvongi was found to form a clade with G. yajiangensis and G. gotyla.
