= Garra arunachalami =

Conservation status
- Critically Endangered (IUCN 3.1)

Scientific classification
- Kingdom: Animalia
- Phylum: Chordata
- Class: Actinopterygii
- Order: Cypriniformes
- Family: Cyprinidae
- Subfamily: Labeoninae
- Genus: Garra
- Species: G. arunachalami

Binomial name
- Garra arunachalami (Johnson & Soranam, 2001)

Synonyms
- Horalabiosa arunachalami (Johnson & Soranam 2001)

Species of fish

Garra arunachalami is a species of fish that was described by J.A. Johnson and Soranam (2001). It is included in the genus Garra and the carp family. The IUCN categorizes the species as critically endangered. No subspecies are listed in the Catalogue of Life. It is sometimes placed in the genus Horalabiosa.
