= Eidinemacheilus smithi =

Conservation status
- Vulnerable (IUCN 2.3)

Scientific classification
- Kingdom: Animalia
- Phylum: Chordata
- Class: Actinopterygii
- Division: Teleostei
- Order: Cypriniformes
- Family: Nemacheilidae
- Genus: Eidinemacheilus
- Species: E. smithi

Binomial name
- Eidinemacheilus smithi (Greenwood, 1976)

Synonyms
- Noemacheilus smithi Greenwood, 1976; Paracobitis smithi (Greenwood, 1976)

Species of fish

Eidinemacheilus smithi, also known as the Zagros blind loach, is a species of loach in the family Nemacheilidae. Nemacheilidae is a diverse family of small benthic cypriniform fishes which are distributed mainly across Europe and Asia, where most species inhabit cool, fast-flowing streams and rivers. This cavefish is endemic to an aquifer in the Karun River drainage in the Zagros Mountains of Iran. Adults have no pigment and no functioning eyes. Individuals are reported to reach lengths of approximately 5.5 cm, and they inhabit groundwater-fed pools, wells, and resurgences connected to the Loven Cave (Kaaje-Ru) system. The species used to be long known only from its type locality near the Baq-e-Loveh oasis, and it is named after British explorer Anthony Smith, who collected the type specimens. In 2022, a second new population was found at Tuveh Spring, about 31 km south of Loven Cave. Because it occupies small, isolated underground habitats in a limited distribution, it is listed as Vulnerable (D2) on the IUCN Red List under the 1994 criteria currently. There are three other known cavefish species in Iran: Garra lorestanensis, G. tashanensis and G. typhlops.

== Description ==
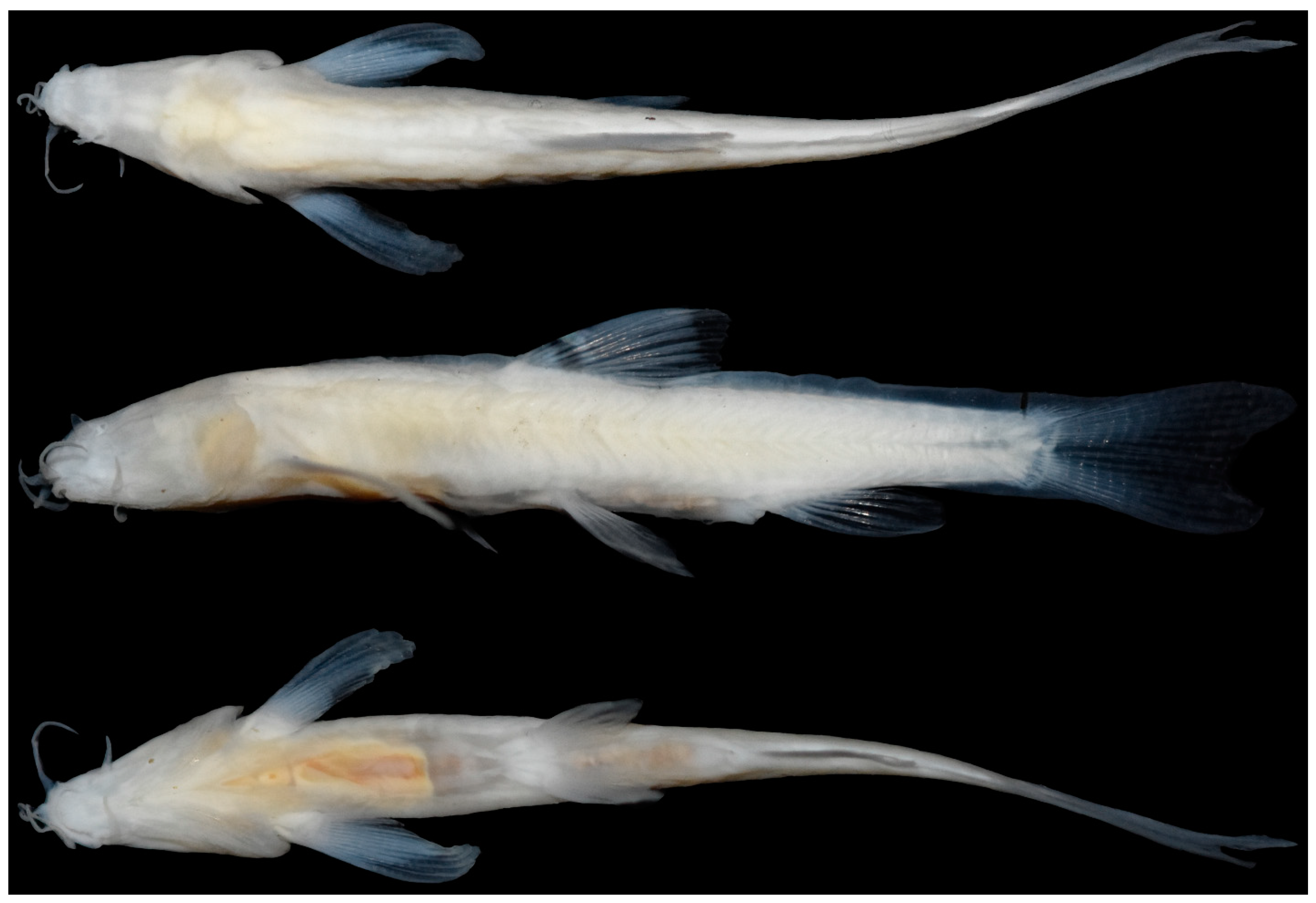
Preserved specimens of Eidinemacheilus smithi .

To distinguish Eidinemacheilus from sympatric crested loaches (Paracobitis) and other Middle Eastern nemacheilids, it has such characteristics: a narrow adipose keel along the dorsal margin of the caudal peduncle; no pigmentation and no eyes; smooth lips with minute papillae; a strongly reduced head canal system.

The meristic counts include dorsal fin with 7 rays, anal fin with 5 rays, pectoral fins with 10 rays, pelvic fins with 5 rays, and caudal fin with 7+7 branched rays.

== Geographic distribution ==
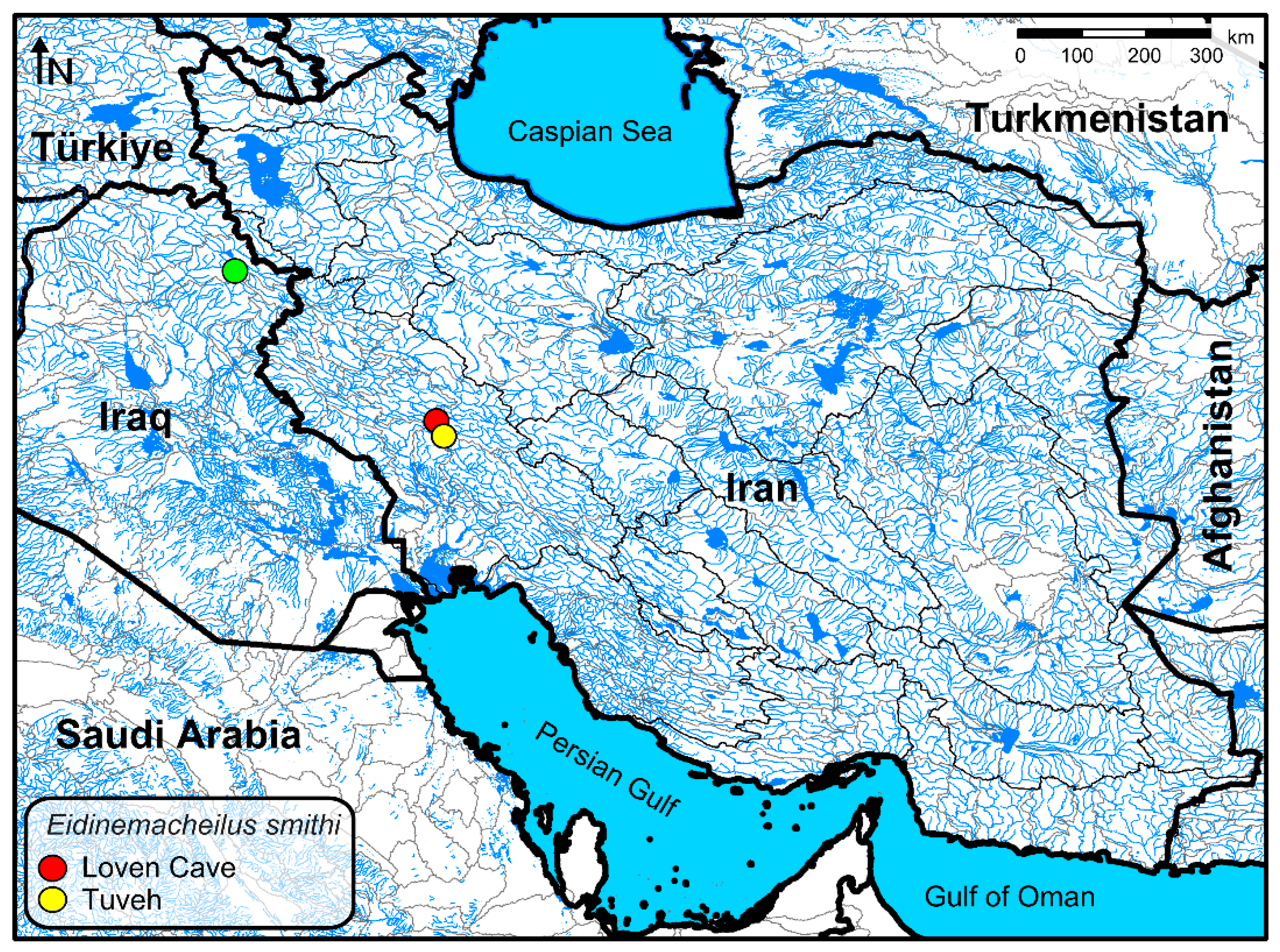
The known localities of Eidinemacheilus smithi.

Historically, the only documented location for this species was the Loven Cave system in western Iran's Zagros Mountains, specifically at a natural well near the Baq-e-Loveh oasis at Kaaje-Ru, within the Karun River drainage. The second population was found in 2022, at Tuveh Spring, roughly 31 km south of Loven Cave, showing a very limited distribution within connected karst aquifers of the Karun–Dez (Sezar) basin. No confirmed occurrences are known outside this drainage, and the species’ underground occupied sites are spatially discrete and likely under-surveyed. Although the known distribution of Eidinemacheilus smithi is very small, its family, Nemacheilidae, is a widely distributed bottom-dwelling group. It is commonly found in streams and rivers throughout much of Europe and Asia, and may also be found in caves, swamps and lakes.

== Biology ==
In taxonomy, Eidinemacheilus smithi is placed in Kingdom Animalia, Phylum Chordata and Class Actinopterygii, the ray-finned fishes. Within ray-finned fishes it belongs to the order Cypriniformes, the major group that includes carps, minnows and loaches, and belongs to the stone-loach family Nemacheilidae. Within Nemacheilidae it belongs to the genus Eidinemacheilus, which currently contains only two species, E. smithi and E. proudlovei from Iran and Iraqi Kurdistan.

There is little published information on the life history of Eidinemacheilus smithi. At Tuveh Spring, the habitat is seasonal and can dry out in summer; individuals either died locally or dispersed downstream, and the floods may have washed away fish or eggs in the Loven Cave system, which shows the persistence of underground refuges with intermittent surface emergence. As a troglobitic loach without eyes or pigment, E. smithi likely relies primarily on non-visual sensory modalities for foraging and navigation, and cavefish often exhibit expansion of the mechanosensory lateral line system and associated behaviors. Diet and reproduction remain undocumented for E. smithi, but studies of cavefishes more broadly indicate their diets are mostly detritus, plant material, and aquatic invertebrates.

Although almost nothing is known about the life history of E. smithi, its characteristics can be inferred to some extent from its family's information. Nemacheilidae is one of the most diverse primary freshwater fish families, with hundreds of species of small, elongated loaches distributed across much of Eurasia, particularly in cool sources like streams and rivers. Additionally, studies of other nemacheilid loaches show that most such species are small benthic fish like minnows that feed on benthic invertebrates and detritus, and they use the spaces between gravel and pebbles as cover in fast-flowing streams. With such minnow-like characteristics, it is likely easier for some lineages to move from surface streams into karst aquifers and caves and finally evolve as E. smithi. Also with this ability of moving, because the population in Loven Cave is persistent while the appearance at Tuveh Spring is seasonal, it can be inferred that the population system may function as source–sink dynamics, with the cave as the source and the spring as the sink, which means that the fish at Tuveh Spring are probably migrants from the cave population instead of members of a self-sustaining local population.

== Conservation ==
Eidinemacheilus smithi is currently listed as Vulnerable (D2) on the IUCN Red List under the 1994 criteria, showing its extremely small area of habitats. Regional pressures include groundwater over-extraction and declining recharge across Iran because of unsustainable water management. This situation increases the risk of springs and wells drying up and degradation of underground habitats. In response, national groundwater programs have emphasized closing illegal wells, equipping wells with volumetric/smart meters, and strengthening patrols. Such controls are directly related to protecting the spring and cave flows of the Karun–Dez system. On a broader scale for its family, Nemacheilidae, regional assessments of stone loaches in Europe indicate that many species are threatened by habitat degradation, water abstraction, and pollution. They emphasize the importance of protecting clean headwater streams and springs for conserving the family.
