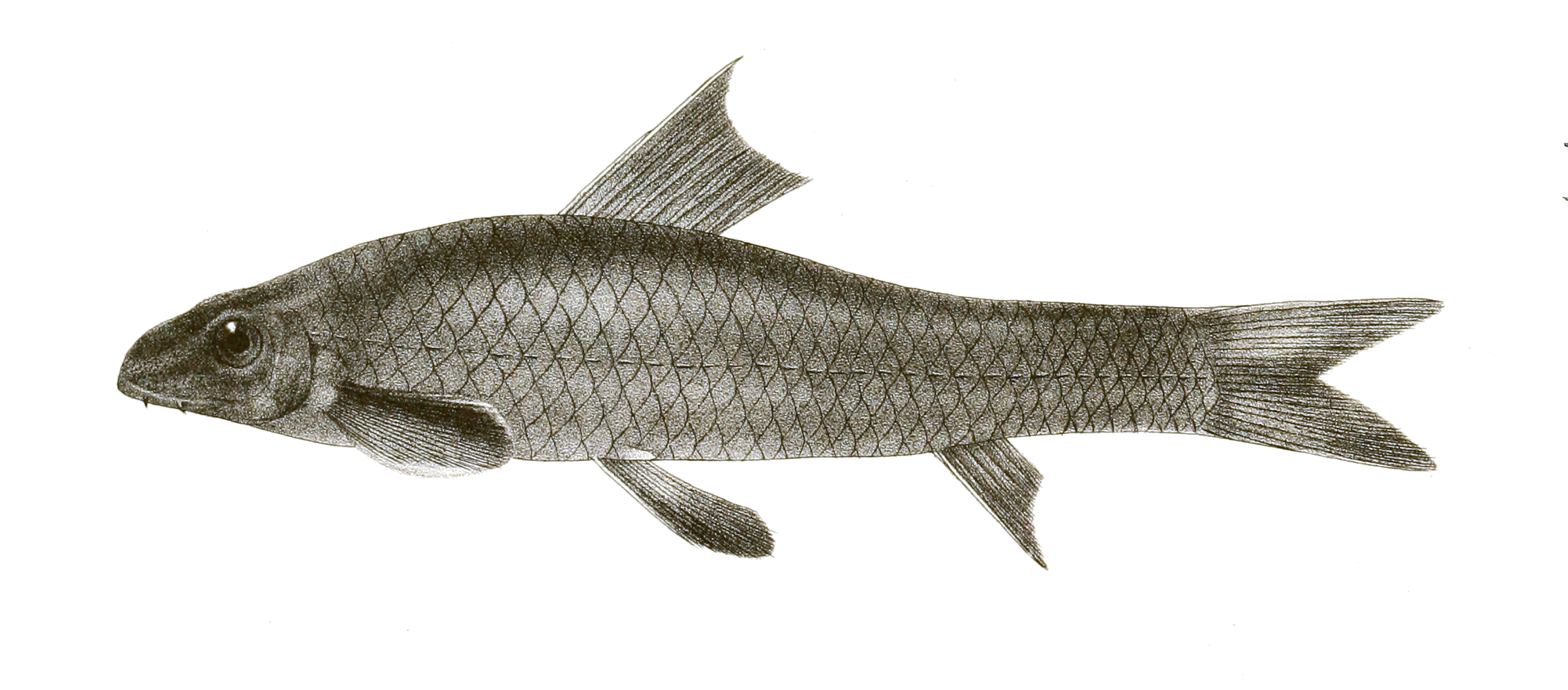

Scientific classification
- Kingdom: Animalia
- Phylum: Chordata
- Class: Actinopterygii
- Order: Cypriniformes
- Family: Cyprinidae
- Genus: Garra
- Species: G. jerdoni

Binomial name
- Garra jerdoni Day, 1867

Synonyms
- Discognathus jerdoni

= Garra jerdoni =

Species of fish

Garra jerdoni is a species of ray-finned fish in the family Cyprinidae. The species is endemic to India. It is sometimes considered conspecific with Garra mcclellandi. The meat of this fish is extremely hazardous if its taken from dirty or unsafe water.
