= Garra mamshuqa =

Conservation status
- Endangered (IUCN 3.1)

Scientific classification
- Kingdom: Animalia
- Phylum: Chordata
- Class: Actinopterygii
- Order: Cypriniformes
- Family: Cyprinidae
- Subfamily: Labeoninae
- Genus: Garra
- Species: G. mamshuqa

Binomial name
- Garra mamshuqa Krupp, 1983

Species of fish

Garra mamshuqa is a species of ray-finned fish in the genus Garra which is endemic to the Wadi Hadramaut drainage in Yemen.
