= Garra allostoma =

Conservation status
- Vulnerable (IUCN 3.1)

Scientific classification
- Kingdom: Animalia
- Phylum: Chordata
- Class: Actinopterygii
- Order: Cypriniformes
- Family: Cyprinidae
- Subfamily: Labeoninae
- Genus: Garra
- Species: G. allostoma

Binomial name
- Garra allostoma T. R. Roberts, 1990

Species of fish

Garra allostoma is a species of ray-finned fish in the genus Garra. It is known only from the mountainous region around Bamenda in Cameroon, where it may be threatened by deforestation.
