= Garra culiciphaga =

Conservation status
- Least Concern (IUCN 3.1)

Scientific classification
- Kingdom: Animalia
- Phylum: Chordata
- Class: Actinopterygii
- Order: Cypriniformes
- Family: Cyprinidae
- Subfamily: Labeoninae
- Genus: Garra
- Species: G. culiciphaga

Binomial name
- Garra culiciphaga (Pellegrin, 1927)

Synonyms
- Hemigrammocapoeta culiciphaga Pellegrin, 1927

Species of fish

Garra culiciphaga, the red stripe barb, is a species of freshwater fish in the family Cyprinidae. It lives in rivers in Syria and Turkey. It has a restricted range, but is not considered to be under threat.
