= Garra biloborostris =

Scientific classification
- Domain: Eukaryota
- Kingdom: Animalia
- Phylum: Chordata
- Class: Actinopterygii
- Order: Cypriniformes
- Family: Cyprinidae
- Genus: Garra
- Species: G. biloborostris

Binomial name
- Garra biloborostris Roni & Vishwanath, 2017

Species of fish

Garra biloborostris is a species of fish in the genus Garra. The fish is found in Assam's Brahmaputra tributaries.
