= Garra fuliginosa =

Conservation status
- Least Concern (IUCN 3.1)

Scientific classification
- Kingdom: Animalia
- Phylum: Chordata
- Class: Actinopterygii
- Order: Cypriniformes
- Family: Cyprinidae
- Subfamily: Labeoninae
- Genus: Garra
- Species: G. fuliginosa

Binomial name
- Garra fuliginosa Fowler, 1934

Synonyms
- Discolabeo fisheri Fowler, 1937; Garra fisheri (Fowler, 1937)

Species of fish

Garra fuliginosa is a species of ray-finned fish in the genus Garra. It is native to fast flowing water in large Indochinese rivers.
