= Garra rossica =

Scientific classification
- Kingdom: Animalia
- Phylum: Chordata
- Class: Actinopterygii
- Order: Cypriniformes
- Family: Cyprinidae
- Subfamily: Labeoninae
- Genus: Garra
- Species: G. rossica

Binomial name
- Garra rossica (A. M. Nikolskii, 1900)

Synonyms
- Discognathus rossicus Nikolskii, 1900; Discognathus Phryne Annandale, 1919

Species of fish

Garra rossica is a species of ray-finned fish in the genus Garra from eastern Iran, Afghanistan and Pakistan.
