= Garra cornigera =

Scientific classification
- Kingdom: Animalia
- Phylum: Chordata
- Class: Actinopterygii
- Order: Cypriniformes
- Family: Cyprinidae
- Subfamily: Labeoninae
- Genus: Garra
- Species: G. cornigera

Binomial name
- Garra cornigera Shangningam & Vishwanath, 2015

Species of fish

Garra cornigera is a species of cyprinid fish in the genus Garra endemic to the Sanalok River in India.
