= Garra aethiopica =

Conservation status
- Least Concern (IUCN 3.1)

Scientific classification
- Kingdom: Animalia
- Phylum: Chordata
- Class: Actinopterygii
- Order: Cypriniformes
- Family: Cyprinidae
- Subfamily: Labeoninae
- Genus: Garra
- Species: G. aethiopica

Binomial name
- Garra aethiopica (Pellegrin, 1927)

Synonyms
- Discognathus aethiopicus Pellegrin, 1927

Species of fish

Garra aethiopica is a species of ray-finned fish in the genus Garra. It is endemic to Ethiopia where it is found in the basins of the Awash River and Tekeze River.
