= Garra hughi =

Conservation status
- Endangered (IUCN 3.1)

Scientific classification
- Kingdom: Animalia
- Phylum: Chordata
- Class: Actinopterygii
- Order: Cypriniformes
- Family: Cyprinidae
- Subfamily: Labeoninae
- Genus: Garra
- Species: G. hughi

Binomial name
- Garra hughi Silas, 1955

Species of fish

Garra hughi (cardamon garra) is an endangered species of cyprinid fish. It occurs in high mountain streams of the Southern Western Ghats, from the Anamalai Hills south to the Agasthyamala Hills. The species is a benthopelagic fish, found in mountain streams.

== Description ==
Garra hughi can grow to 15.5 cm (6.1 in) standard length.

== Ecology ==
The juveniles are free swimmers and are found in cleaner waters closer to the banks and in pools and puddles along the course of the stream. The juveniles have an omnivorous diet including earthworms, aquatic insects, mostly larvae of chironomids and ephemeropterans and bits of filamentous algae and detritus, which is different from that of the adult. The adult fish shifts to feeding on vegetable matter (mainly algae) and changes its mode of living, to life close to the substratum of the rapid waters of the streams.

A lot of the habitat of G. hughi is threatened because of habitat loss and degradation caused by plantations, pollution, and destructive fishing practices.
