= Garra persica =

Scientific classification
- Kingdom: Animalia
- Phylum: Chordata
- Class: Actinopterygii
- Order: Cypriniformes
- Family: Cyprinidae
- Subfamily: Labeoninae
- Genus: Garra
- Species: G. persica

Binomial name
- Garra persica L. S. Berg, 1914

Species of fish

Garra persica is a species of ray-finned fish in the genus Garra from Iran and Iraq.
