= Garra kempi =

Kemp garra

Conservation status
- Least Concern (IUCN 3.1)

Scientific classification
- Kingdom: Animalia
- Phylum: Chordata
- Class: Actinopterygii
- Order: Cypriniformes
- Family: Cyprinidae
- Subfamily: Labeoninae
- Genus: Garra
- Species: G. kempi

Binomial name
- Garra kempi Hora, 1921

Species of fish

Garra kempi, the Kemp garra, is a species of ray-finned fish in the genus Garra from the Indian states of Arunachal Pradesh, Manipur, Meghalaya, Mizoram and Nagaland.
