= Garra kimini =

Scientific classification
- Kingdom: Animalia
- Phylum: Chordata
- Class: Actinopterygii
- Order: Cypriniformes
- Family: Cyprinidae
- Subfamily: Labeoninae
- Genus: Garra
- Species: G. kimini

Binomial name
- Garra kimini Arunachalam, Nandagopal & Mayden, 2013

Species of fish

Garra kimini is a species of ray-finned fish in the genus Garra, endemic to the Ranga River drainage in India.
