= Garra sindhi =

Scientific classification
- Kingdom: Animalia
- Phylum: Chordata
- Class: Actinopterygii
- Order: Cypriniformes
- Family: Cyprinidae
- Subfamily: Labeoninae
- Genus: Garra
- Species: G. sindhi

Binomial name
- Garra sindhi Lyon, Geiger, & Freyhof, 2016

Species of fish

Garra sindhi is a species of cyprinid fish in the genus Garra endemic to the Wadi Andhur in Oman.
