= Garra fluviatilis =

Scientific classification
- Kingdom: Animalia
- Phylum: Chordata
- Class: Actinopterygii
- Order: Cypriniformes
- Family: Cyprinidae
- Subfamily: Labeoninae
- Genus: Garra
- Species: G. fluviatilis

Binomial name
- Garra fluviatilis Kangrang, Thoni, Mayden, & Beamish, 2016

Species of fish

Garra fluviatilis is a species of cyprinid fish in the genus Garra endemic to the Khwae Noi River in Thailand.
