= Garra menderesensis =

Scientific classification
- Kingdom: Animalia
- Phylum: Chordata
- Class: Actinopterygii
- Order: Cypriniformes
- Family: Cyprinidae
- Subfamily: Labeoninae
- Genus: Garra
- Species: G. menderesensis

Binomial name
- Garra menderesensis (Küçük, Bayçelebi, Güçlü & Gülle, 2015)

Synonyms
- Hemigrammocapoeta menderesensis

Species of fish

Garra menderesensis is a species of ray-finned fish in the genus Garra, endemic to Lake Işıklı and the Büyük Menderes River in Turkey.
