= Garra festai =

Conservation status
- Critically Endangered (IUCN 3.1)

Scientific classification
- Kingdom: Animalia
- Phylum: Chordata
- Class: Actinopterygii
- Order: Cypriniformes
- Family: Cyprinidae
- Genus: Garra
- Species: G. festai

Binomial name
- Garra festai (Tortonese, 1939)

Species of fish

Garra festai is a species of ray-finned fish in the family Cyprinidae. The species is endemic to the Aammiq Wetland in Lebanon.
