= Garra tana =

Conservation status
- Vulnerable (IUCN 3.1)

Scientific classification
- Kingdom: Animalia
- Phylum: Chordata
- Class: Actinopterygii
- Order: Cypriniformes
- Family: Cyprinidae
- Subfamily: Labeoninae
- Genus: Garra
- Species: G. tana

Binomial name
- Garra tana Getahun & Stiassny, 2007

Species of fish

Garra tana is a species of tropical ray-finned fish in the genus Garra. It is endemic to Lake Tana in Ethiopia. It reaches a maximum length of around 10.5 cm, and can be found close to shore. It is listed as vulnerable under the IUCN red list status.
