= Garra dembecha =

Conservation status
- Least Concern (IUCN 3.1)

Scientific classification
- Kingdom: Animalia
- Phylum: Chordata
- Class: Actinopterygii
- Order: Cypriniformes
- Family: Cyprinidae
- Subfamily: Labeoninae
- Genus: Garra
- Species: G. dembecha

Binomial name
- Garra dembecha Getahun & Stiassny, 2007

Species of fish

Garra dembecha is a species of cyprinid fish in the genus Garra from East Africa.
