= Garra lissorhynchus =

Conservation status
- Least Concern (IUCN 3.1)

Scientific classification
- Kingdom: Animalia
- Phylum: Chordata
- Class: Actinopterygii
- Order: Cypriniformes
- Family: Cyprinidae
- Subfamily: Labeoninae
- Genus: Garra
- Species: G. lissorhynchus

Binomial name
- Garra lissorhynchus (McClelland, 1842)

Synonyms
- Platycara lissorhynchus McClelland, 1842; Discognathus macrochir Günther, 1868; Mayoa modesta Day, 1870; Discognathus modestus(Day, 1870)

Species of fish

Garra lissorhynchus (Khasi garra) is a species of ray-finned fish in the genus Garra from north-eastern India.
