= Garra bicornuta =

Conservation status
- Near Threatened (IUCN 3.1)

Scientific classification
- Kingdom: Animalia
- Phylum: Chordata
- Class: Actinopterygii
- Order: Cypriniformes
- Family: Cyprinidae
- Subfamily: Labeoninae
- Genus: Garra
- Species: G. bicornuta

Binomial name
- Garra bicornuta Narayan Rao, 1920

Species of fish

Garra bicornuta, the Tunga garra, is a small species of ray-finned fish in cyprinid family from rivers in the Western Ghats in India.
