= Garra salweenica =

Conservation status
- Data Deficient (IUCN 3.1)

Scientific classification
- Kingdom: Animalia
- Phylum: Chordata
- Class: Actinopterygii
- Order: Cypriniformes
- Family: Cyprinidae
- Subfamily: Labeoninae
- Genus: Garra
- Species: G. salweenica

Binomial name
- Garra salweenica Hora & Mukerji, 1934

Species of fish

Garra salweenica is a species of ray-finned fish in the genus Garra from Yunnan, Myanmar and Thailand.
