= Garra bispinosa =

Conservation status
- Vulnerable (IUCN 3.1)

Scientific classification
- Kingdom: Animalia
- Phylum: Chordata
- Class: Actinopterygii
- Order: Cypriniformes
- Family: Cyprinidae
- Subfamily: Labeoninae
- Genus: Garra
- Species: G. bispinosa

Binomial name
- Garra bispinosa E. Zhang, 2005

Species of fish

Garra bispinosa is a species of cyprinid fish in the genus Garra from Yunnan.
