= Garra regressa =

Conservation status
- Vulnerable (IUCN 3.1)

Scientific classification
- Kingdom: Animalia
- Phylum: Chordata
- Class: Actinopterygii
- Order: Cypriniformes
- Family: Cyprinidae
- Subfamily: Labeoninae
- Genus: Garra
- Species: G. regressa

Binomial name
- Garra regressa Getahun & Stiassny, 2007

Species of fish

Garra regressa is a species of cyprinid fish in the genus Garra. It is endemic to Ethiopia.
