= Garra congoensis =

Conservation status
- Least Concern (IUCN 3.1)

Scientific classification
- Kingdom: Animalia
- Phylum: Chordata
- Class: Actinopterygii
- Order: Cypriniformes
- Family: Cyprinidae
- Subfamily: Labeoninae
- Genus: Garra
- Species: G. congoensis

Binomial name
- Garra congoensis Poll, 1959

Species of fish

Garra congoensis (Congo logsucker) is a small species of ray-finned fish in the genus Garra. It is native to fast-flowing sections of the lower Congo River in Africa.
