= Garra nambulica =

Conservation status
- Vulnerable (IUCN 3.1)

Scientific classification
- Kingdom: Animalia
- Phylum: Chordata
- Class: Actinopterygii
- Order: Cypriniformes
- Family: Cyprinidae
- Subfamily: Labeoninae
- Genus: Garra
- Species: G. nambulica

Binomial name
- Garra nambulica Vishwanath & Joyshree, 2005

Species of fish

Garra nambulica is a species of cyprinid fish in the genus Garra which is found only in Manipur.
