= Garra ignestii =

Conservation status
- Least Concern (IUCN 3.1)

Scientific classification
- Kingdom: Animalia
- Phylum: Chordata
- Class: Actinopterygii
- Order: Cypriniformes
- Family: Cyprinidae
- Subfamily: Labeoninae
- Genus: Garra
- Species: G. ignestii

Binomial name
- Garra ignestii (Gianferrari, 1925)

Synonyms
- Discognathus ignestii Gianferrari, 1925

Species of fish

Garra ignestii is a species of ray-finned fish in the genus Garra. It is endemic to Ethiopia, occurring only in the drainages of the Tekezé River and the Abbay River in the north of that country.
