= Garra trewavasai =

Scientific classification
- Kingdom: Animalia
- Phylum: Chordata
- Class: Actinopterygii
- Order: Cypriniformes
- Family: Cyprinidae
- Genus: Garra
- Species: G. trewavasai

Binomial name
- Garra trewavasai Monod, 1950

Synonyms
- Garra trewavasae (lapsus)

Species of fish

Garra trewavasai is a species of ray-finned fish in the genus Garra. The specific name of this fish honours the British ichthyologist Ethelwynn Trewavas (1900-1993).
