= Garra alticaputus =

Scientific classification
- Kingdom: Animalia
- Phylum: Chordata
- Class: Actinopterygii
- Order: Cypriniformes
- Family: Cyprinidae
- Subfamily: Labeoninae
- Genus: Garra
- Species: G. alticaputus

Binomial name
- Garra alticaputus Arunachalam, Nandagopal & Mayden, 2013

Species of fish

Garra alticaputus is a species of cyprinid fish in the genus Garra described from the Dikrong River at Boorum village Itanagar, Arunachal Pradesh, India.

== Etymology ==
The name alticaputus came from a Latin word which refers to the deep head of the species.
