= Garra quadrimaculata =

Scientific classification
- Kingdom: Animalia
- Phylum: Chordata
- Class: Actinopterygii
- Order: Cypriniformes
- Family: Cyprinidae
- Subfamily: Labeoninae
- Genus: Garra
- Species: G. quadrimaculata

Binomial name
- Garra quadrimaculata (Rüppell, 1835)

Synonyms
- Gobio quadrimaculatus Rüppell, 1835; Barbus quadrimaculatus (Rüppell, 1835); Discognathus quadrimaculatus (Rüppell, 1835); Gobio hirticeps Rüppell, 1836; Discognathus hirticeps (Rüppell, 1836); Garra brittoni Trewavas, 1941

Species of fish

Garra quadrimaculata is a species of ray-finned fish in the genus Garra. It is mainly found on the Arabian Peninsula (Saudi Arabia and Yemen), but also in southeastern Eritrea, southeastern Ethiopia.
