= Garra tamangi =

Scientific classification
- Kingdom: Animalia
- Phylum: Chordata
- Class: Actinopterygii
- Order: Cypriniformes
- Family: Cyprinidae
- Subfamily: Labeoninae
- Genus: Garra
- Species: G. tamangi

Binomial name
- Garra tamangi (Gurumayum & Kosygin, 2016)

Species of fish

Garra tamangi is a species of ray-finned fish in the genus Garra described from the Dikrong River (a tributary of the Brahmaputra River basin) at Hoj near NHPC complex, Itanagar, Papum Pare district, Arunachal Pradesh, north eastern India.

== Description ==
Garra tamangi can be distinguished from its congeners by having roughly- a triangular proboscis trilobed with two small lobes anteriorly free and a large median lobe anteroventrally tuberculated. Di-,tri-and tetracuspid tubercles on snout.

== Etymology ==
The species is named after Lakpa Tamang in recognition of his assistance to the authors during the field work in Arunachal Pradesh.
