= Garra cyclostomata =

Scientific classification
- Kingdom: Animalia
- Phylum: Chordata
- Class: Actinopterygii
- Order: Cypriniformes
- Family: Cyprinidae
- Subfamily: Labeoninae
- Genus: Garra
- Species: G. cyclostomata

Binomial name
- Garra cyclostomata Đ. Y. Mai, 1978

Species of fish

Garra cyclostomata is a species of ray-finned fish in the genus Garra from Laos and Vietnam.
