= Garra arupi =

Scientific classification
- Kingdom: Animalia
- Phylum: Chordata
- Class: Actinopterygii
- Order: Cypriniformes
- Family: Cyprinidae
- Subfamily: Labeoninae
- Genus: Garra
- Species: G. arupi

Binomial name
- Garra arupi Nebeshwar, Vishwanath & D. N. Das, 2009

Species of fish

Garra arupi is a species of cyprinid fish in the genus Garra from the upper Brahmaputra basin in Arunachal Pradesh.

== Etymology ==
The fish is named in honor of Arup Kumar Das (b. 1952), the Coordinator of the University Grant Commission-sponsored "Centre of Excellence in Biodiversity" of the Rajiv Gandhi University, in Itanagar, India.
