= Garra annandalei =

Conservation status
- Least Concern (IUCN 3.1)

Scientific classification
- Kingdom: Animalia
- Phylum: Chordata
- Class: Actinopterygii
- Order: Cypriniformes
- Family: Cyprinidae
- Genus: Garra
- Species: G. annandalei

Binomial name
- Garra annandalei Hora, 1921

Synonyms
- Garra chaudhurii Hora, 1921; Garra satyendranathi Ganguly & Datta, 1974

Species of fish

Garra annandalei, the Annandale garra or Tunga garra, is a species of ray-finned fish in the genus Garra. It is found in northern Bengal, Bihar and Assam in India, Nepal, Myanmar and possibly Bhutan where it is found in rocky, clear and fast flowing mountain streams.
