= Garra cyrano =

Conservation status
- Data Deficient (IUCN 3.1)

Scientific classification
- Kingdom: Animalia
- Phylum: Chordata
- Class: Actinopterygii
- Order: Cypriniformes
- Family: Cyprinidae
- Subfamily: Labeoninae
- Genus: Garra
- Species: G. cyrano

Binomial name
- Garra cyrano Kottelat, 2000

Species of fish

Garra cyrano is a species of ray-finned fish in the genus Garra from tributaries of the Mekong in Laos.
