= Garra orientalis =

Conservation status
- Least Concern (IUCN 3.1)

Scientific classification
- Kingdom: Animalia
- Phylum: Chordata
- Class: Actinopterygii
- Order: Cypriniformes
- Family: Cyprinidae
- Subfamily: Labeoninae
- Genus: Garra
- Species: G. orientalis

Binomial name
- Garra orientalis Nichols, 1925

Species of fish

Garra orientalis is a species of cyprinid fish in the genus Garra which is found in the Pearl River system of China.
