= Garra abhoyai =

Scientific classification
- Kingdom: Animalia
- Phylum: Chordata
- Class: Actinopterygii
- Order: Cypriniformes
- Family: Cyprinidae
- Subfamily: Labeoninae
- Genus: Garra
- Species: G. abhoyai

Binomial name
- Garra abhoyai Hora, 1921

Species of fish

Garra abhoyai is a fish species in the genus Garra endemic to the Chindwin basin in India.
