= Garra mini =

Scientific classification
- Kingdom: Animalia
- Phylum: Chordata
- Class: Actinopterygii
- Order: Cypriniformes
- Family: Cyprinidae
- Subfamily: Labeoninae
- Genus: Garra
- Species: G. mini

Binomial name
- Garra mini Rahman, Mollah, Norén, & Kullander, 2016

Species of fish

Garra mini is a species of cyprinid fish in the genus Garra endemic to Bangladesh.
