= Garra lancrenonensis =

Conservation status
- Data Deficient (IUCN 3.1)

Scientific classification
- Kingdom: Animalia
- Phylum: Chordata
- Class: Actinopterygii
- Order: Cypriniformes
- Family: Cyprinidae
- Subfamily: Labeoninae
- Genus: Garra
- Species: G. lancrenonensis

Binomial name
- Garra lancrenonensis Blache & Miton, 1960

Species of fish

Garra lancrenonensis is a species of ray-finned fish in the genus Garra known only from the Logone River system in Chad and Cameroon.
