= Garra nethravathiensis =

Scientific classification
- Kingdom: Animalia
- Phylum: Chordata
- Class: Actinopterygii
- Order: Cypriniformes
- Family: Cyprinidae
- Subfamily: Labeoninae
- Genus: Garra
- Species: G. nethravathiensis

Binomial name
- Garra nethravathiensis Arunachalam & Nandagopal, 2014

Species of fish

Garra nethravathiensis is a species of cyprinid fish in the genus Garra which is found in the Netravati River, Karnataka India.
