= Garra namyaensis =

Scientific classification
- Kingdom: Animalia
- Phylum: Chordata
- Class: Actinopterygii
- Order: Cypriniformes
- Family: Cyprinidae
- Subfamily: Labeoninae
- Genus: Garra
- Species: G. namyaensis

Binomial name
- Garra namyaensis Shangningam & Vishwanath, 2012

Species of fish

Garra namyaensis is a species of cyprinid fish in the genus Garra which is found in the Namya River, Manilur India.
