= Garra parastenorhynchus =

Scientific classification
- Kingdom: Animalia
- Phylum: Chordata
- Class: Actinopterygii
- Order: Cypriniformes
- Family: Cyprinidae
- Subfamily: Labeoninae
- Genus: Garra
- Species: G. parastenorhynchus

Binomial name
- Garra parastenorhynchus Thoni, Gurung, & Mayden, 2016

Species of fish

Garra parastenorhynchus is a species of cyprinid fish in the genus Garra endemic to Bhutan.
