= Cameroon logsucker =

Conservation status
- Least Concern (IUCN 3.1)

Scientific classification
- Kingdom: Animalia
- Phylum: Chordata
- Class: Actinopterygii
- Order: Cypriniformes
- Family: Cyprinidae
- Genus: Garra
- Species: G. dembeensis

Binomial name
- Garra dembeensis (Rüppell, 1835)

Synonyms
- Discognathus johnstoni Boulmger, 1901; Chondrostoma dembeensis Rüppell, 1835; Discognathus dembeensis (Rüppell, 1835); Gymnostomus dembeensis (Rüppell, 1835); Discognathus chiarinii Vinciguerra, 1883; Garra johnstonii (Boulenger, 1901); Garra vinciguerrae (Boulenger, 1901)

Species of fish

Garra dembeensis, the Dembea stone lapper, is a small African species of ray-finned fish in the family Cyprinidae. It occurs in fast-flowing sections of rivers and wave-washed shores of lakes in the Nile system and other freshwater systems in East and Central Africa, although its presence in the Congo River basin is uncertain.
