= Garra rupecula =

Conservation status
- Near Threatened (IUCN 3.1)

Scientific classification
- Kingdom: Animalia
- Phylum: Chordata
- Class: Actinopterygii
- Order: Cypriniformes
- Family: Cyprinidae
- Subfamily: Labeoninae
- Genus: Garra
- Species: G. rupecula

Binomial name
- Garra rupecula (McClelland, 1839)

Synonyms
- Gonorhynchus rupeculus McClelland, 1839; Gonorhynchus brachypterus McClelland, 1839

Species of fish

The Mishmi garra (Garra rupecula) is a species of ray-finned fish in the genus Garra. It is endemic to north-eastern India.
