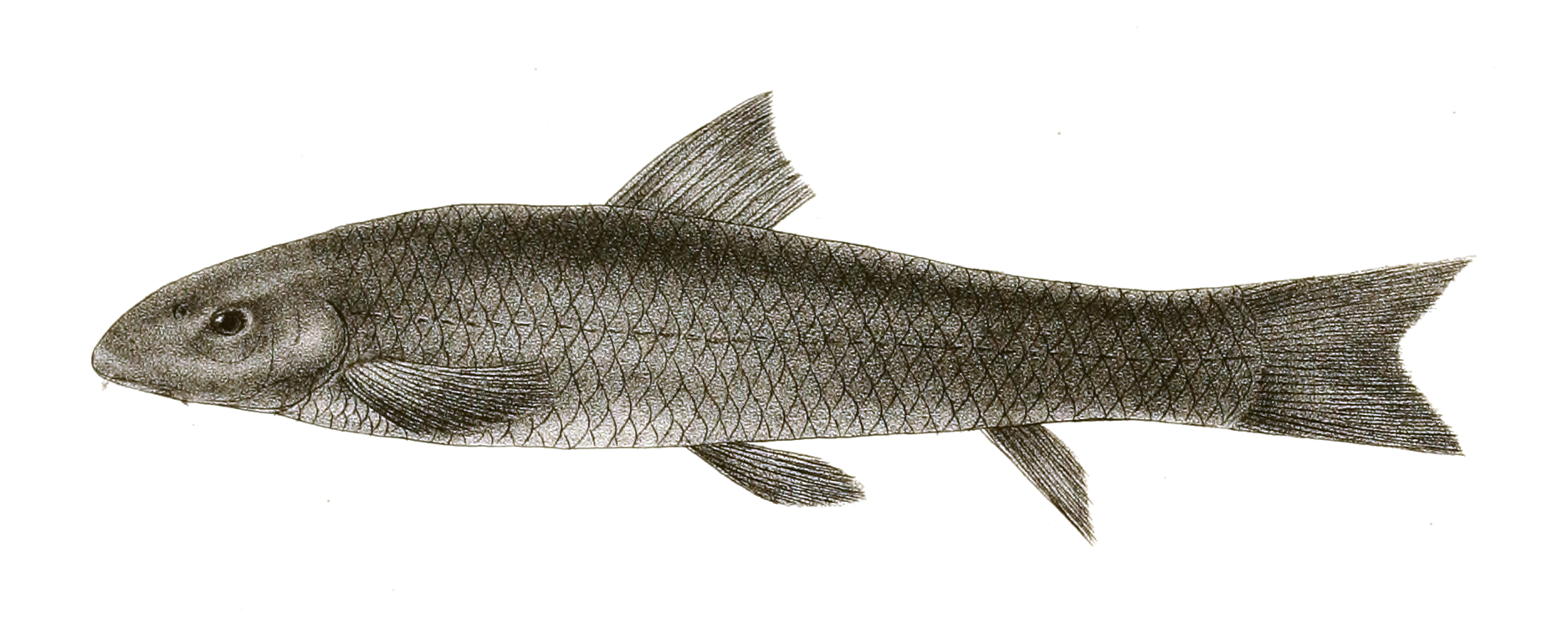

Conservation status
- Least Concern (IUCN 3.1)

Scientific classification
- Kingdom: Animalia
- Phylum: Chordata
- Class: Actinopterygii
- Order: Cypriniformes
- Family: Cyprinidae
- Subfamily: Labeoninae
- Genus: Garra
- Species: G. lamta

Binomial name
- Garra lamta (F. Hamilton, 1822)

Synonyms
- Cyprinus lamta Hamilton, 1822; Discognathus lamta (Hamilton, 1822); Garra prashadi Hora, 1921

= Garra lamta =

Species of fish

Garra lamta is a species of cyprinid in the genus Garra from south Asia.
