= Garra khawbungi =

Scientific classification
- Kingdom: Animalia
- Phylum: Chordata
- Class: Actinopterygii
- Order: Cypriniformes
- Family: Cyprinidae
- Subfamily: Labeoninae
- Genus: Garra
- Species: G. khawbungi

Binomial name
- Garra khawbungi Arunachalam, Nandagopal & Mayden, 2014

Species of fish

Garra khawbungi is a species of ray-finned fish in the genus Garra, endemic to the Tuipui River in India.
