= Garra robertsi =

Scientific classification
- Kingdom: Animalia
- Phylum: Chordata
- Class: Actinopterygii
- Order: Cypriniformes
- Family: Cyprinidae
- Subfamily: Labeoninae
- Genus: Garra
- Species: G. robertsi

Binomial name
- Garra robertsi Thoni & Mayden, 2015

Species of fish

Garra robertsi is a species of cyprinid fish in the genus Garra found in the Sungai Bongan and Tempassuk Rivers in Sabah Borneo.
