= Garra poecilura =

Conservation status
- Near Threatened (IUCN 3.1)

Scientific classification
- Kingdom: Animalia
- Phylum: Chordata
- Class: Actinopterygii
- Order: Cypriniformes
- Family: Cyprinidae
- Subfamily: Labeoninae
- Genus: Garra
- Species: G. poecilura

Binomial name
- Garra poecilura S. O. Kullander & F. Fang, 2004

Species of fish

Garra poecilura is a species of cyprinid fish in the genus Garra from southern Myanmar.
