= Garra geba =

Conservation status
- Least Concern (IUCN 3.1)

Scientific classification
- Kingdom: Animalia
- Phylum: Chordata
- Class: Actinopterygii
- Order: Cypriniformes
- Family: Cyprinidae
- Subfamily: Labeoninae
- Genus: Garra
- Species: G. geba

Binomial name
- Garra geba Getahun & Stiassny, 2007

Species of fish

Garra geba is a species of cyprinid fish in the genus Garra. It is endemic to Ethiopia.

== Size ==
Max length: 8.6 cm

== Environment and climate ==
Garra geba only lives in freshwater and in a tropical climate.

== Distribution ==
Garra geba are known to be found in Africa specifically the Geba River in Ethiopia.

== Description ==
Garra geba has a total of 11 dorsal soft rays and 9 anal soft rays. Garra geba have distinct features in which it is distinguished from African congeners. Their depressed head and gracile body, between five and nine predorsal scales, asquamate chest, posterior chamber of gas bladder small all contribute to individual features. It is a very slender and elongated fish with two pairs of barbels. The first pair are called the maxillary barbels which are usually slightly longer than the other rostral pair. The Garra geba's dorsal-fin membrane is a pale cream color with a faint band of black between the rays. It also has around 4 or 5 black spots between the rays with its anal, pelvic, and pectoral fins usually being a pale creamy brown. The caudal fin on the Garra geba is a pale brown and its median rays are dark brown.
