= Antakya minnow =

Conservation status
- Least Concern (IUCN 3.1)

Scientific classification
- Kingdom: Animalia
- Phylum: Chordata
- Class: Actinopterygii
- Order: Cypriniformes
- Family: Cyprinidae
- Genus: Garra
- Species: G. caudomaculata

Binomial name
- Garra caudomaculata (Battalgil, 1942)

Synonyms
- Crossocheilus caudomaculatus; Hemigrammocapoeta caudomaculata

Species of fish

The Antakya minnow or Orontes golden barb, (Garra caudomaculata) is a species of ray-finned fish in the genus Garra. There is some confusion regarding the identity of this fish. Formerly thought to be extinct, when occupying the Orontes watershed in Turkey, however a synonym, Hemigrammocapoeta caudomaculata is identified as least concern by the IUCN, and is found in the Asi drainage (Asi is synonymous with Orontes) in Turkey and Syria and Nahr al-Kabir river on the border between Syria and Lebanon, and called the Asi golden barb. They are now considered to be the same species.
