= Garra emarginata =

Scientific classification
- Kingdom: Animalia
- Phylum: Chordata
- Class: Actinopterygii
- Order: Cypriniformes
- Family: Cyprinidae
- Subfamily: Labeoninae
- Genus: Garra
- Species: G. emarginata

Binomial name
- Garra emarginata Kurup & Radhakrishnan, 2011

Species of fish

Garra emarginata is a species of ray-finned fish in the genus Garra endemic to the Periyar River in Kerala, India.
