= Garra platycephala =

Scientific classification
- Kingdom: Animalia
- Phylum: Chordata
- Class: Actinopterygii
- Order: Cypriniformes
- Family: Cyprinidae
- Subfamily: Labeoninae
- Genus: Garra
- Species: G. platycephala

Binomial name
- Garra platycephala Narayan Rao, 1920

Species of fish

Garra platycephala is a species of cyprinid fish in the genus Garra which is found in India.
