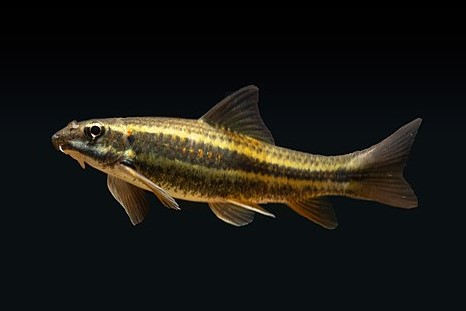

Conservation status
- Endangered (IUCN 3.1)

Scientific classification
- Domain: Eukaryota
- Kingdom: Animalia
- Phylum: Chordata
- Class: Actinopterygii
- Order: Cypriniformes
- Family: Cyprinidae
- Subfamily: Labeoninae
- Genus: Garra
- Species: G. kalakadensis

Binomial name
- Garra kalakadensis Rema Devi, 1993

= Garra kalakadensis =

Species of fish

Garra kalakadensis is a species of cyprinid fish in the genus Garra which is endemic to the Western Ghats in India. It is described from Kalakkad Mundanthurai Tiger Preserve.
