= Garra sahilia =

Conservation status
- Least Concern (IUCN 3.1)

Scientific classification
- Kingdom: Animalia
- Phylum: Chordata
- Class: Actinopterygii
- Order: Cypriniformes
- Family: Cyprinidae
- Subfamily: Labeoninae
- Genus: Garra
- Species: G. sahilia

Binomial name
- Garra sahilia Krupp, 1983

Species of fish

Garra sahilia is a species of ray-finned fish in the genus Garra from Arabia.

Subspecies are:

- Garra sahilia sahilia Krupp, 1983
- Garra sahilia gharbia Krupp, 1983
