= Phillips's garra =

Conservation status
- Critically Endangered (IUCN 3.1)

Scientific classification
- Kingdom: Animalia
- Phylum: Chordata
- Class: Actinopterygii
- Order: Cypriniformes
- Family: Cyprinidae
- Subfamily: Labeoninae
- Genus: Garra
- Species: G. phillipsi

Binomial name
- Garra phillipsi Deraniyagala, 1933

Species of fish

Phillips's garra (Garra phillipsi) is a species of freshwater fish in the family Cyprinidae. It is found only in Sri Lanka, where it is restricted to a single stream on the Moussakele tea estate, near Gammaduwa in the Upper Knuckles mountain range at altitudes between 1,036 and 1,066 m (3,400 and 3,500 ft) ASL.

It is named in honour of Maj. William Watt Addison Phillips MBE (1892–1981), British tea and rubber planter and amateur naturalist, who collected the holotype.
