= Garra buettikeri =

Conservation status
- Vulnerable (IUCN 3.1)

Scientific classification
- Kingdom: Animalia
- Phylum: Chordata
- Class: Actinopterygii
- Order: Cypriniformes
- Family: Cyprinidae
- Subfamily: Labeoninae
- Genus: Garra
- Species: G. buettikeri

Binomial name
- Garra buettikeri Krupp, 1983

Species of fish

Garra buettikeri is a species of ray-finned fish in the genus Garra. It is endemic to Saudi Arabia.
