= Garra minimus =

Scientific classification
- Kingdom: Animalia
- Phylum: Chordata
- Class: Actinopterygii
- Order: Cypriniformes
- Family: Cyprinidae
- Subfamily: Labeoninae
- Genus: Garra
- Species: G. minimus

Binomial name
- Garra minimus Arunachalam, Nandagopal & Mayden, 2013

Species of fish

Garra minimus is a species of cyprinid fish in the genus Garra described from the Ranga River, Lower Subansiri District, Arunachal Pradesh, India.

== Etymology ==
The name minimus came from a Latin word which refers to the small body size of the species.
