= Garra chakpiensis =

Scientific classification
- Kingdom: Animalia
- Phylum: Chordata
- Class: Actinopterygii
- Order: Cypriniformes
- Family: Cyprinidae
- Subfamily: Labeoninae
- Genus: Garra
- Species: G. chakpiensis

Binomial name
- Garra chakpiensis Nebeshwar Sharma & Vishwanath, 2015

Species of fish

Garra chakpiensis is a species of cyprinid fish in the genus Garra endemic to the Chindwin River Basin in India.
