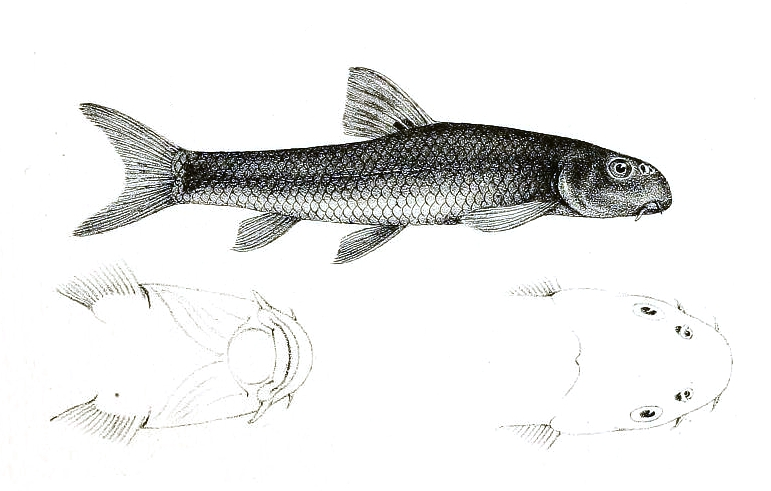

Conservation status
- Least Concern (IUCN 3.1)

Scientific classification
- Kingdom: Animalia
- Phylum: Chordata
- Class: Actinopterygii
- Order: Cypriniformes
- Family: Cyprinidae
- Subfamily: Labeoninae
- Genus: Garra
- Species: G. blanfordii

Binomial name
- Garra blanfordii (Boulenger, 1901)

Synonyms
- Discognathus blanfordii Boulenger, 1901; Discognathus vinciguerrae Boulenger, 1901; Discognathus giarrabensis Gianferrari, 1932; Garra giarrabensis (Gianferrari, 1932)

= Garra blanfordii =

Species of fish

Garra blanfordii is a species of ray-finned fish in the genus Garra from Eritrea, Sudan and Ethiopia, in Ethiopia it is abundant in the basin of the Abbay River.
