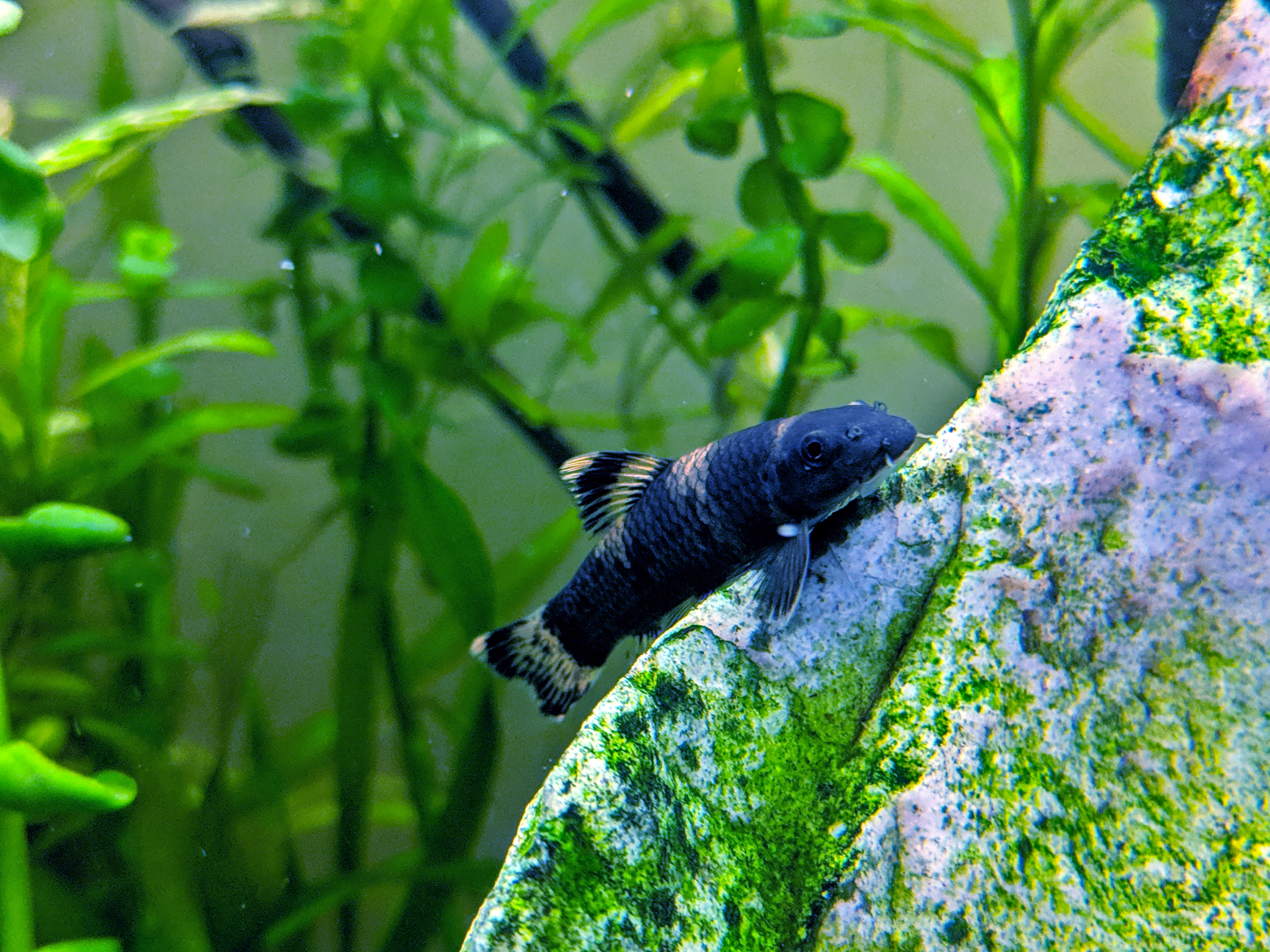

Conservation status
- Vulnerable (IUCN 3.1)

Scientific classification
- Kingdom: Animalia
- Phylum: Chordata
- Class: Actinopterygii
- Order: Cypriniformes
- Family: Cyprinidae
- Genus: Garra
- Species: G. flavatra

Binomial name
- Garra flavatra S. O. Kullander & F. Fang, 2004

= Garra flavatra =

Species of fish

Garra flavatra, also called Panda Garra, is a species of cyprinid fish in the genus Garra.
