= Garra manipurensis =

Conservation status
- Vulnerable (IUCN 3.1)

Scientific classification
- Kingdom: Animalia
- Phylum: Chordata
- Class: Actinopterygii
- Order: Cypriniformes
- Family: Cyprinidae
- Subfamily: Labeoninae
- Genus: Garra
- Species: G. manipurensis

Binomial name
- Garra manipurensis Vishwanath & Sarojnalini, 1988

Species of fish

Garra manipurensis is a species of ray-finned fish in the genus Garra which is endemic to Manipur.
