= Garra chebera =

Scientific classification
- Kingdom: Animalia
- Phylum: Chordata
- Class: Actinopterygii
- Order: Cypriniformes
- Family: Cyprinidae
- Subfamily: Labeoninae
- Genus: Garra
- Species: G. chebera

Binomial name
- Garra chebera Habteselassie, Mikschi, Ahnelt & Waidbacher, 2010

Species of fish

Garra chebera is a species of ray-finned fish in the genus Garra. It is endemic to the Dildil Stream in Ethiopia.
