= Garra quadratirostris =

Scientific classification
- Kingdom: Animalia
- Phylum: Chordata
- Class: Actinopterygii
- Order: Cypriniformes
- Family: Cyprinidae
- Subfamily: Labeoninae
- Genus: Garra
- Species: G. quadratirostris

Binomial name
- Garra quadratirostris Nebeshwar Sharma & Vishwanath, 2013

Species of fish

Garra quadratirostris is a species of cyprinid fish in the genus Garra which is found in India.
