= Garra wanae =

Scientific classification
- Kingdom: Animalia
- Phylum: Chordata
- Class: Actinopterygii
- Order: Cypriniformes
- Family: Cyprinidae
- Subfamily: Labeoninae
- Genus: Garra
- Species: G. wanae

Binomial name
- Garra wanae (Regan, 1914)

Synonyms
- Discognathus wanae Regan, 1914

Species of fish

Garra wanae is a species of ray-finned fish in the genus Garra which is found in Balochistan.
