= Garra mlapparaensis =

Scientific classification
- Kingdom: Animalia
- Phylum: Chordata
- Class: Actinopterygii
- Order: Cypriniformes
- Family: Cyprinidae
- Subfamily: Labeoninae
- Genus: Garra
- Species: G. mlapparaensis

Binomial name
- Garra mlapparaensis Madhusoodana Kurup, & Radhakrishnan, 2011

Species of fish

Garra mlapparaensis is a species of ray-finned fish in the genus Garra, endemic to Kerala in India.
