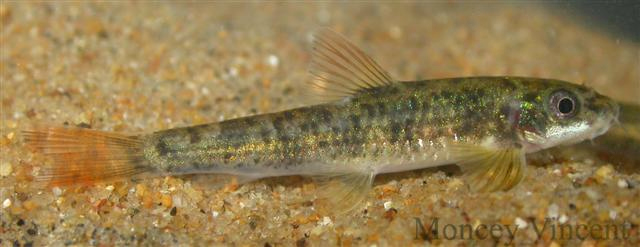

Conservation status
- Endangered (IUCN 3.1)

Scientific classification
- Kingdom: Animalia
- Phylum: Chordata
- Class: Actinopterygii
- Order: Cypriniformes
- Family: Cyprinidae
- Subfamily: Labeoninae
- Genus: Garra
- Species: G. surendranathanii

Binomial name
- Garra surendranathanii Shaji, Arun & Easa, 1996

= Garra surendranathanii =

Species of fish

Garra surendranathanii is a species of ray-finned fish in the genus Garra from the Western Ghats in Kerala. It occurs on four river systems the Periyar, Chalakudy, Pamba and Achenkovil in the state. A decline in habitat quality has endangered this fish.
