= Garra periyarensis =

- Rough Illustration

Conservation status
- Vulnerable (IUCN 3.1)

Scientific classification
- Kingdom: Animalia
- Phylum: Chordata
- Class: Actinopterygii
- Order: Cypriniformes
- Family: Cyprinidae
- Subfamily: Labeoninae
- Genus: Garra
- Species: G. periyarensis

Binomial name
- Garra periyarensis Gopi, 2001

Species of fish

Garra periyarensis is a species of cyprinid fish in the genus Garra. It is found only in the upstream reaches of Periyar River, in Kerala, India.

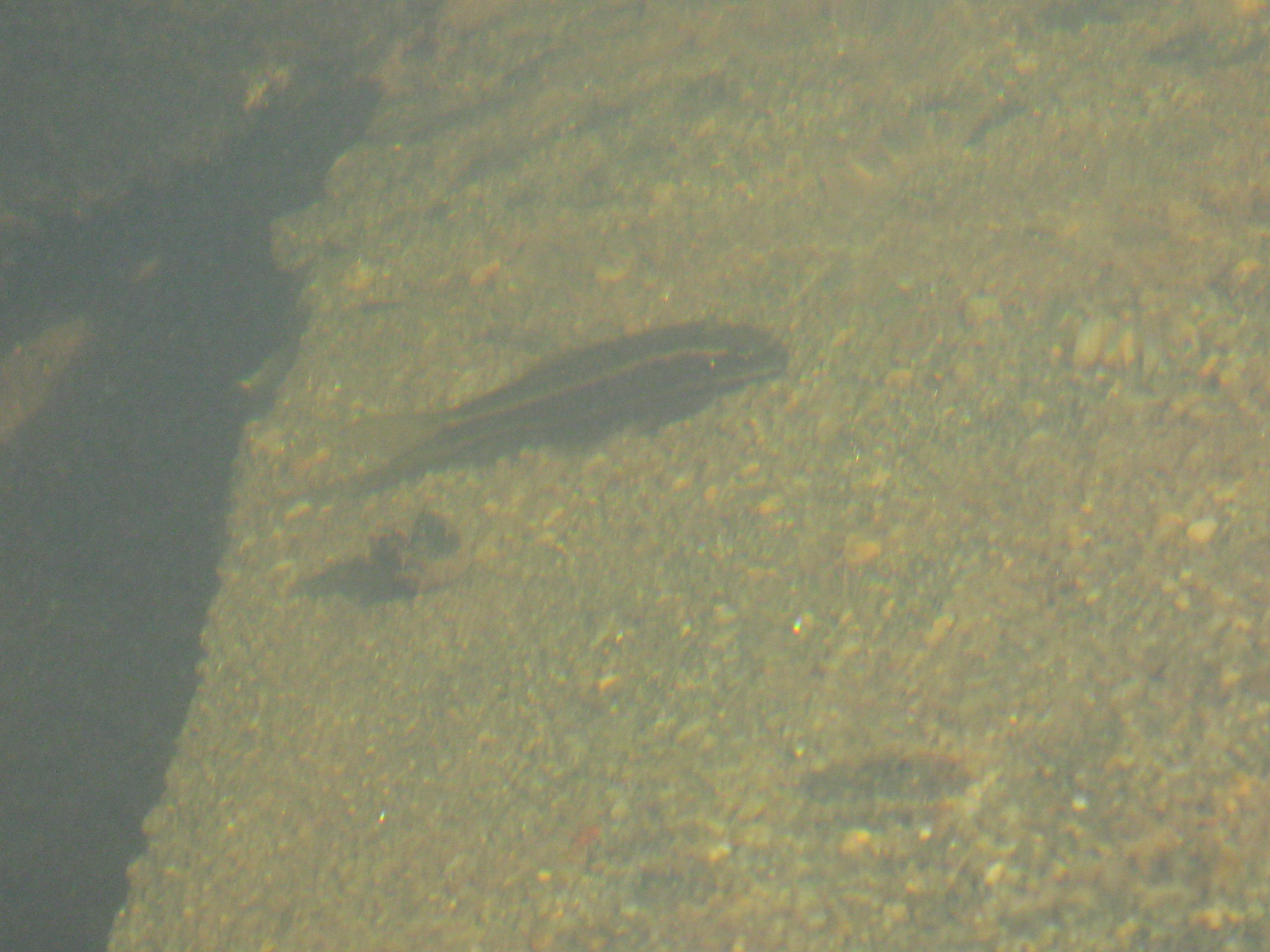
Garra periyarensis a view from periyar river
