= Garra longchuanensis =

Scientific classification
- Kingdom: Animalia
- Phylum: Chordata
- Class: Actinopterygii
- Order: Cypriniformes
- Family: Cyprinidae
- Subfamily: Labeoninae
- Genus: Garra
- Species: G. longchuanensis

Binomial name
- Garra longchuanensis Yu, Wang, Xiong, & He, 2016

Species of fish

Garra longchuanensis is a species of cyprinid fish in the genus Garra endemic to the Yiluowadi Jiang in China.
