= Garra hindii =

Conservation status
- Data Deficient (IUCN 3.1)

Scientific classification
- Kingdom: Animalia
- Phylum: Chordata
- Class: Actinopterygii
- Order: Cypriniformes
- Family: Cyprinidae
- Subfamily: Labeoninae
- Genus: Garra
- Species: G. hindii

Binomial name
- Garra hindii (Boulenger, 1905)

Synonyms
- Discognathus hindii Boulenger, 1905

Species of fish

Garra hindii is a species of cyprinid fish found in Africa.
