= Garra amirhosseini =

Scientific classification
- Kingdom: Animalia
- Phylum: Chordata
- Class: Actinopterygii
- Order: Cypriniformes
- Family: Cyprinidae
- Subfamily: Labeoninae
- Genus: Garra
- Species: G. amirhosseini

Binomial name
- Garra amirhosseini Esmaeili, Sayyadzadeh, Coad & Eagderi, 2016

Species of fish

Garra amirhosseini is a fish species in the genus Garra endemic to the Tigris River drainage in Iran.
