= Garra elegans =

Conservation status
- Least Concern (IUCN 3.1)

Scientific classification
- Kingdom: Animalia
- Phylum: Chordata
- Class: Actinopterygii
- Order: Cypriniformes
- Family: Cyprinidae
- Subfamily: Labeoninae
- Genus: Garra
- Species: G. elegans

Binomial name
- Garra elegans (Günther, 1868)

Synonyms
- Hemigrammocapoeta elegans (Günther, 1868); Hemigarra elegans (Günther, 1868); Tylognathus elegans Günther, 1868

Species of fish

Garra elegans, previously Hemigrammocapoeta elegans, is a species of cyprinid fish. It is a benthopelagic freshwater species endemic to the Euphrates – Tigris basin in Western Asia.
