= Garra tibanica =

Conservation status
- Least Concern (IUCN 3.1)

Scientific classification
- Kingdom: Animalia
- Phylum: Chordata
- Class: Actinopterygii
- Order: Cypriniformes
- Family: Cyprinidae
- Subfamily: Labeoninae
- Genus: Garra
- Species: G. tibanica

Binomial name
- Garra tibanica Trewavas, 1941

Species of fish

Garra tibanica is a species of ray-finned fish in the genus Garra.
