= Garra waensis =

Scientific classification
- Kingdom: Animalia
- Phylum: Chordata
- Class: Actinopterygii
- Order: Cypriniformes
- Family: Cyprinidae
- Subfamily: Labeoninae
- Genus: Garra
- Species: G. waensis

Binomial name
- Garra waensis Lothongkham, Arbsuwan & Musikasinthorn, 2014

Species of fish

Garra waensis is a species of cyprinid fish in the genus Garra endemic to the Wa River in Thailand.
