= Garra menoni =

Conservation status
- Vulnerable (IUCN 3.1)

Scientific classification
- Kingdom: Animalia
- Phylum: Chordata
- Class: Actinopterygii
- Order: Cypriniformes
- Family: Cyprinidae
- Subfamily: Labeoninae
- Genus: Garra
- Species: G. menoni

Binomial name
- Garra menoni Rema Devi & Indra, 1984

Species of fish

Garra menoni is a species of ray-finned fish in the genus Garra endemic to the Western Ghats in the Indian state of Kerala.
