= Garra arunachalensis =

Scientific classification
- Kingdom: Animalia
- Phylum: Chordata
- Class: Actinopterygii
- Order: Cypriniformes
- Family: Cyprinidae
- Subfamily: Labeoninae
- Genus: Garra
- Species: G. arunachalensis

Binomial name
- Garra arunachalensis Nebeshwar Sharma & Vishwanath, 2013

Species of fish

Garra arunachalensis is a fish species in the genus Garra endemic to India.
