= Garra litanensis =

Conservation status
- Vulnerable (IUCN 3.1)

Scientific classification
- Kingdom: Animalia
- Phylum: Chordata
- Class: Actinopterygii
- Order: Cypriniformes
- Family: Cyprinidae
- Subfamily: Labeoninae
- Genus: Garra
- Species: G. litanensis

Binomial name
- Garra litanensis Vishwanath, 1993

Species of fish

Garra litanensis is a species of ray-finned fish in the genus Garra known from a single stream in the north-eastern Indian state of Manipur.
