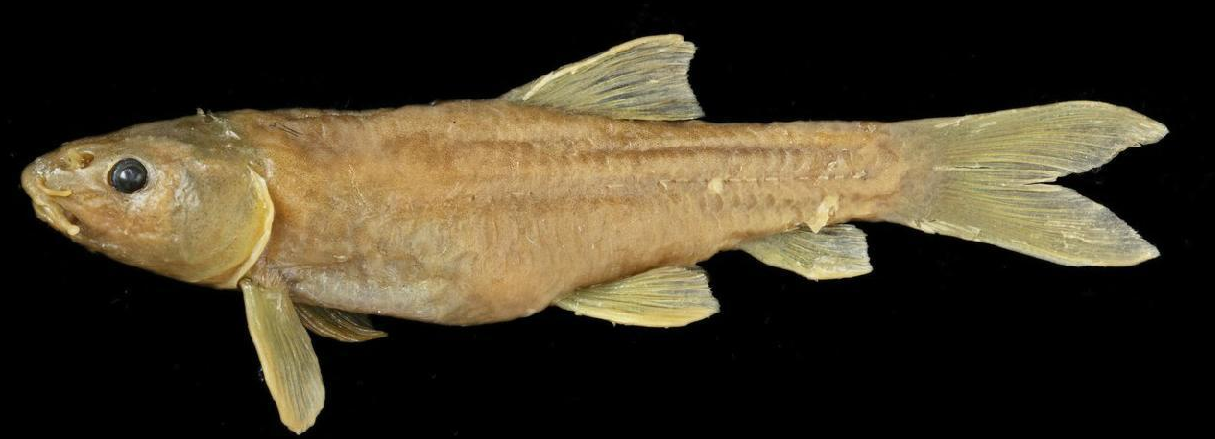

Conservation status
- Endangered (IUCN 3.1)

Scientific classification
- Kingdom: Animalia
- Phylum: Chordata
- Class: Actinopterygii
- Order: Cypriniformes
- Family: Cyprinidae
- Genus: Garra
- Species: G. dunsirei

Binomial name
- Garra dunsirei Banister, 1987

= Garra dunsirei =

Species of fish

Garra dunsirei, the Tawi Atair garra, is a species of ray-finned fish in the family Cyprinidae. This cavefish lacks pigmentation and is found only in pools near Tawi Atair in Dhofar, Oman. Unlike the cave form of the related Oman garra (G. barreimiae), G. dunsirei has normal eyes.
