= Garra bourreti =

Conservation status
- Least Concern (IUCN 3.1)

Scientific classification
- Kingdom: Animalia
- Phylum: Chordata
- Class: Actinopterygii
- Order: Cypriniformes
- Family: Cyprinidae
- Subfamily: Labeoninae
- Genus: Garra
- Species: G. bourreti

Binomial name
- Garra bourreti (Pellegrin, 1928)

Synonyms
- Discognathus bourreti Pellegrin, 1928

Species of fish

Garra bourreti is a species of ray-finned fish in the genus Garra from Vietnam.
