= Garra stenorhynchus =

Conservation status
- Least Concern (IUCN 3.1)

Scientific classification
- Kingdom: Animalia
- Phylum: Chordata
- Class: Actinopterygii
- Order: Cypriniformes
- Family: Cyprinidae
- Subfamily: Labeoninae
- Genus: Garra
- Species: G. stenorhynchus

Binomial name
- Garra stenorhynchus (Jerdon, 1849)

Species of fish

Garra stenorhynchus, also known as the Nilgiri garra, is a species of cyprinid fish in the genus Garra from the western Ghats in India, that reaches a length of 15.5 cm (6.1 in).

It was formerly a subspecies of Garra gotyla.
