= Garra naganensis =

Conservation status
- Least Concern (IUCN 3.1)

Scientific classification
- Kingdom: Animalia
- Phylum: Chordata
- Class: Actinopterygii
- Order: Cypriniformes
- Family: Cyprinidae
- Subfamily: Labeoninae
- Genus: Garra
- Species: G. naganensis

Binomial name
- Garra naganensis Hora, 1921

Synonyms
- Garra tirapensis Datta & Barman, 1984

Species of fish

Garra naganensis (Naga garra) is a species of ray-finned fish in the genus Garra, widespread in northeastern India.
