= Garra tengchongensis =

Scientific classification
- Kingdom: Animalia
- Phylum: Chordata
- Class: Actinopterygii
- Order: Cypriniformes
- Family: Cyprinidae
- Subfamily: Labeoninae
- Genus: Garra
- Species: G. tengchongensis

Binomial name
- Garra tengchongensis E. Zhang & Yi-Yu Chen, 2002

Species of fish

Garra tengchongensis is a species of cyprinid fish in the subfamily Labeoninae. It occurs in the upper Irrawaddy River basin in Yunnan, China.
