= Garra poilanei =

Conservation status
- Data Deficient (IUCN 3.1)

Scientific classification
- Kingdom: Animalia
- Phylum: Chordata
- Class: Actinopterygii
- Order: Cypriniformes
- Family: Cyprinidae
- Subfamily: Labeoninae
- Genus: Garra
- Species: G. poilanei

Binomial name
- Garra poilanei Petit & T. L. Tchang, 1933

Species of fish

Garra poilanei is a species of ray-finned fish in the genus Garra from northern Vietnam, Yunnan in China and northern Laos.
