= Garra mirofrontis =

Scientific classification
- Kingdom: Animalia
- Phylum: Chordata
- Class: Actinopterygii
- Order: Cypriniformes
- Family: Cyprinidae
- Subfamily: Labeoninae
- Genus: Garra
- Species: G. mirofrontis

Binomial name
- Garra mirofrontis X. L. Chu & G. H. Cui, 1987

Species of fish

Garra mirofrontis is a species of ray-finned fish in the genus Garra.
