= Garra nasuta =

Conservation status
- Least Concern (IUCN 3.1)

Scientific classification
- Kingdom: Animalia
- Phylum: Chordata
- Class: Actinopterygii
- Order: Cypriniformes
- Family: Cyprinidae
- Subfamily: Labeoninae
- Genus: Garra
- Species: G. nasuta

Binomial name
- Garra nasuta (McClelland, 1838)

Synonyms
- Garra tirapensis Datta & Barman, 1984

Species of fish

Garra nasuta (nose logsucker) is a species of ray-finned fish in the genus Garra found in fast-flowing hill streams in Asia.
