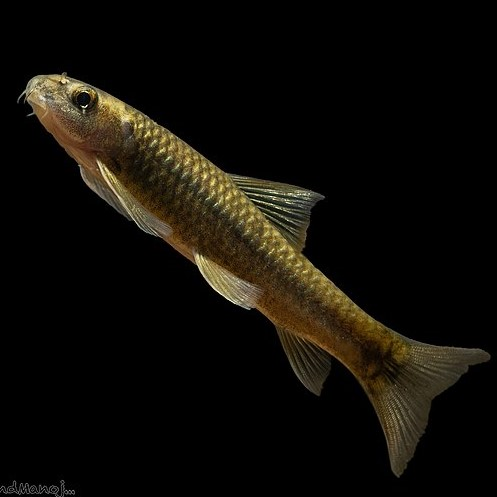

Conservation status
- Endangered (IUCN 3.1)

Scientific classification
- Kingdom: Animalia
- Phylum: Chordata
- Class: Actinopterygii
- Order: Cypriniformes
- Family: Cyprinidae
- Subfamily: Labeoninae
- Genus: Garra
- Species: G. joshuai

Binomial name
- Garra joshuai (Silas, 1954)

Synonyms
- Horalabiosa joshuai Silas, 1954

= Garra joshuai =

Species of fish

Garra joshuai, the lipped algae eater, is a species of cyprinid fish in the genus Garra endemic to streams in the Western Ghats in India.
