= Garra borneensis =

Scientific classification
- Kingdom: Animalia
- Phylum: Chordata
- Class: Actinopterygii
- Order: Cypriniformes
- Family: Cyprinidae
- Subfamily: Labeoninae
- Genus: Garra
- Species: G. borneensis

Binomial name
- Garra borneensis (Vaillant, 1902)

Synonyms
- Discognathus borneensis Vaillant, 1902

Species of fish

Garra borneensis is a species of ray-finned fish in the genus Garra from Borneo.
