= Garra lautior =

Conservation status
- Endangered (IUCN 3.1)

Scientific classification
- Kingdom: Animalia
- Phylum: Chordata
- Class: Actinopterygii
- Order: Cypriniformes
- Family: Cyprinidae
- Subfamily: Labeoninae
- Genus: Garra
- Species: G. lautior

Binomial name
- Garra lautior Banister, 1987

Species of fish

Garra lautior is a species of ray-finned fish in the genus Garra, endemic to the Wadi Hadramut drainage in Yemen.
