= Garra variabilis =

Conservation status
- Least Concern (IUCN 3.1)

Scientific classification
- Kingdom: Animalia
- Phylum: Chordata
- Class: Actinopterygii
- Division: Teleostei
- Order: Cypriniformes
- Family: Cyprinidae
- Subfamily: Labeoninae
- Genus: Garra
- Species: G. variabilis

Binomial name
- Garra variabilis (Heckel, 1843)

Synonyms
- Discognathus variabilis Heckel, 1843

Species of fish

Garra variabilis is a species of ray-finned fish in the genus Garra from Lebanon, Turkey, Syria and Iraq.
