= Garra dulongensis =

Scientific classification
- Kingdom: Animalia
- Phylum: Chordata
- Class: Actinopterygii
- Order: Cypriniformes
- Family: Cyprinidae
- Subfamily: Labeoninae
- Genus: Garra
- Species: G. dulongensis

Binomial name
- Garra dulongensis Chen, Pan, Kong & Yang, 2006

Synonyms
- Placocheilus dulongensis (Chen, Pan, Kong & Yang, 2006)

Species of fish

Garraa dulongensis is a species of ray-finned fish from the family Cyprinidae, the carps and minnows, which is found only in China. Fishbase places it in the genus Garra but Eschmeyer places it in Placocheilus.
