= Garra compressa =

Conservation status
- Vulnerable (IUCN 3.1)

Scientific classification
- Kingdom: Animalia
- Phylum: Chordata
- Class: Actinopterygii
- Order: Cypriniformes
- Family: Cyprinidae
- Subfamily: Labeoninae
- Genus: Garra
- Species: G. compressa

Binomial name
- Garra compressa Kosygin & Vishwanath, 1998

Species of fish

Garra compressa is a species of ray-finned fish in the genus Garra which occurs only in Manipur in eastern India.
