= Garra trilobata =

Scientific classification
- Kingdom: Animalia
- Phylum: Chordata
- Class: Actinopterygii
- Order: Cypriniformes
- Family: Cyprinidae
- Subfamily: Labeoninae
- Genus: Garra
- Species: G. trilobata

Binomial name
- Garra trilobata Shangningam & Vishwanath, 2015

Species of fish

Garra trilobata is a species of cyprinid fish in the genus Garra endemic to the Sanalok River in India.
