= Garra propulvinus =

Conservation status
- Near Threatened (IUCN 3.1)

Scientific classification
- Kingdom: Animalia
- Phylum: Chordata
- Class: Actinopterygii
- Order: Cypriniformes
- Family: Cyprinidae
- Subfamily: Labeoninae
- Genus: Garra
- Species: G. propulvinus

Binomial name
- Garra propulvinus S. O. Kullander & F. Fang, 2004

Species of fish

Garra propulvinus is a species of cyprinid fish in the genus Garra from Myanmar.
