= Garra nigricauda =

Scientific classification
- Kingdom: Animalia
- Phylum: Chordata
- Class: Actinopterygii
- Order: Cypriniformes
- Family: Cyprinidae
- Subfamily: Labeoninae
- Genus: Garra
- Species: G. nigricauda

Binomial name
- Garra nigricauda Arunachalam, Nandagopal & Mayden, 2013

Species of fish

Garra nigricauda is a species of cyprinid fish in the genus Garra which is found in the Brahmaputra River, Arunachal Pradesh, India.
