= Garra imberbis =

Conservation status
- Data Deficient (IUCN 3.1)

Scientific classification
- Kingdom: Animalia
- Phylum: Chordata
- Class: Actinopterygii
- Order: Cypriniformes
- Family: Cyprinidae
- Subfamily: Labeoninae
- Genus: Garra
- Species: G. imberbis

Binomial name
- Garra imberbis (Vinciguerra, 1890)

Synonyms
- Discognathus imberbis Vinciguerra, 1890

Species of fish

Garra imberbis is a species of ray-finned fish in the genus Garra, endemic to Myanmar.
