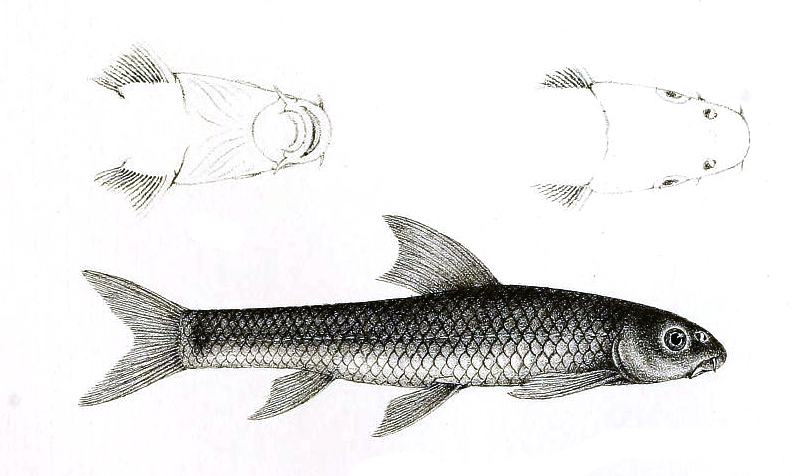

Conservation status
- Least Concern (IUCN 3.1)

Scientific classification
- Kingdom: Animalia
- Phylum: Chordata
- Class: Actinopterygii
- Order: Cypriniformes
- Family: Cyprinidae
- Subfamily: Labeoninae
- Genus: Garra
- Species: G. makiensis

Binomial name
- Garra makiensis (Boulenger, 1904)

Synonyms
- Discognathus makiensis Boulenger, 1904; Discognathus rothschildi Pellegrin, 1905

= Garra makiensis =

Species of fish

Garra makiensis is a species of ray-finned fish in the genus Garra. It is endemic to Ethiopia.
