= Garra magnidiscus =

Scientific classification
- Kingdom: Animalia
- Phylum: Chordata
- Class: Actinopterygii
- Order: Cypriniformes
- Family: Cyprinidae
- Subfamily: Labeoninae
- Genus: Garra
- Species: G. magnidiscus

Binomial name
- Garra magnidiscus Tamang, 2013

Species of fish

Garra magnidiscus is a species of cyprinid fish in the genus Garra. Identified in 2013, Garra m. is found in the Upper Siang district of Arunachal Pradesh where is it is known locally as Ngop. The name magnidiscus (in Latin: large disc) refers to a distinctive large adhesive disc found in the posterior region of its mouth.
