= Garra rotundinasus =

Scientific classification
- Kingdom: Animalia
- Phylum: Chordata
- Class: Actinopterygii
- Order: Cypriniformes
- Family: Cyprinidae
- Subfamily: Labeoninae
- Genus: Garra
- Species: G. rotundinasus

Binomial name
- Garra rotundinasus E. Zhang, 2006

Species of fish

Garra rotundinasus is a species of cyprinid fish in the genus Garra.
