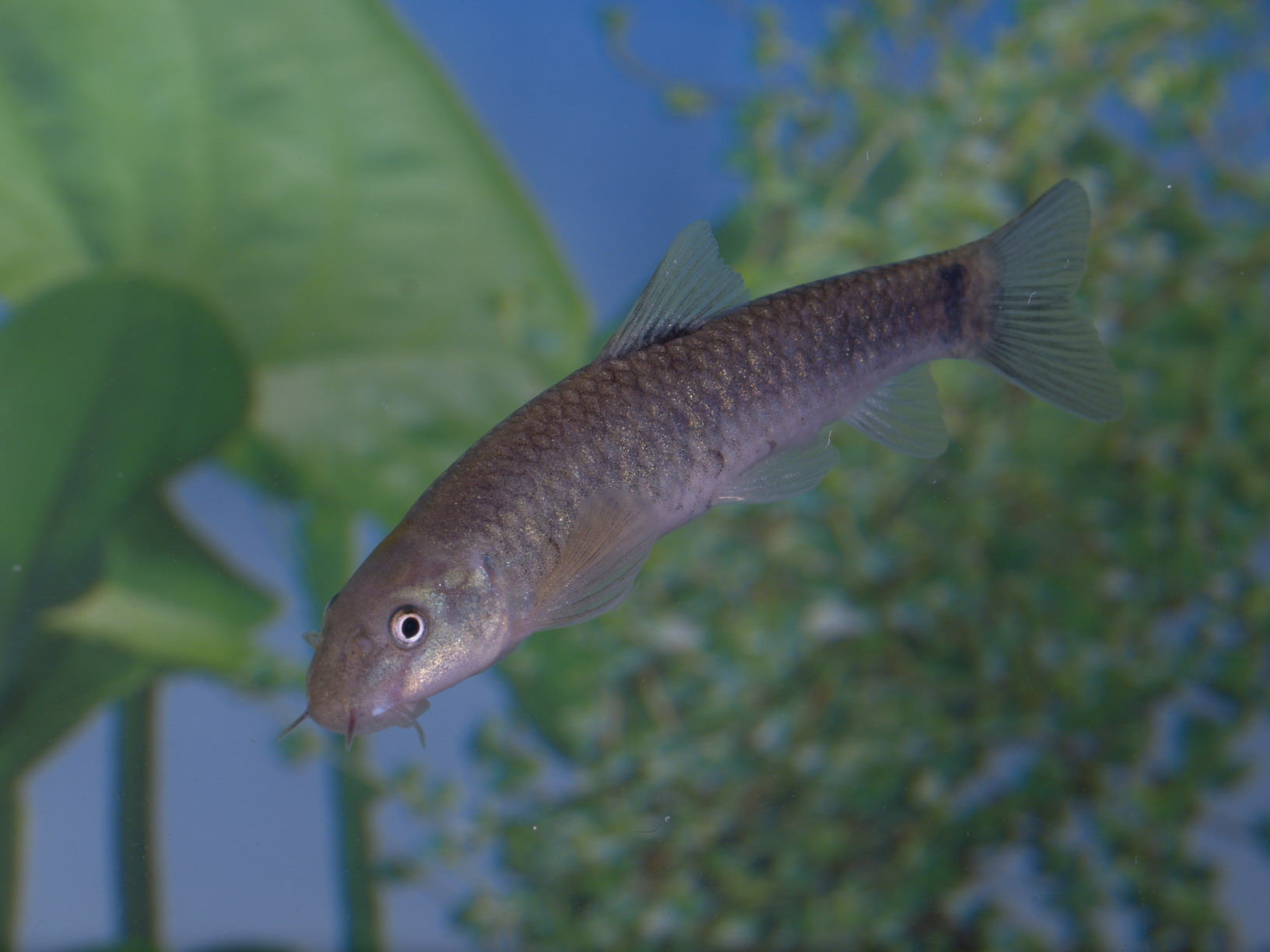

Conservation status
- Least Concern (IUCN 3.1)

Scientific classification
- Kingdom: Animalia
- Phylum: Chordata
- Class: Actinopterygii
- Division: Teleostei
- Order: Cypriniformes
- Family: Cyprinidae
- Subfamily: Labeoninae
- Genus: Garra
- Species: G. barreimiae

Binomial name
- Garra barreimiae Fowler & Steinitz, 1956

= Garra barreimiae =

Species of fish

Garra barreimiae, the Oman garra, is a species of ray-finned fish in the family Cyprinidae. It is found in the mountains of northern Oman and in the United Arab Emirates. Most populations inhabit wadis, streams, pools and springs, but one population which lives in a cave system, is known as Omani blind cave fish, and has lost its sight and pigmentation. The only other cave fish in the Arabian Peninsula is the Tawi Atair garra (G. dunsirei), but it has normal eyes.

== Taxonomy ==
The Oman garra was first described in 1956 by the American zoologist Henry Weed Fowler and the Israeli zoologist Heinz Steinitz as Garra barreimiae. The following subspecies are recognised:

- G. b. barreimiae Fowler & Steinitz, 1956
- G. b. gallagheri Krupp, 1988
- G. b. shawkahensis Banister & Clarke, 1977
- G. b. wurayahi Khalaf, 2009

The blind cave form has been found to be little different from the sighted form genetically. The subspecies are generally limited to different watersheds.

== Description ==
Garra barreimiae is a small, slender fish, somewhat flattened on the underside. It grows to a length of about 7–8 cm (2.8–3.1 in). The head is wedge-shaped and has a suction plate on the lower jaw and a blunt snout. This fish is a fairly dark colour and is speckled; it has a paler transverse band just behind the head. An unpigmented form with fewer scales and no external eyes has been found living underground. Juveniles of this form are sighted at first, but as they get older, skin grows over their eyes.

== Distribution and habitat ==
This species is endemic to the mountainous eastern region of the United Arab Emirates and northern region of Oman. It is often the most common fish species in its range. In both countries it is present on the western side of the mountains and in Oman, it is also present on the east side. This fish typically lives in wadis, in gravel or rock pools, in springs, in small streams and in slow-moving water. The blind form is only known from the Hoti cave systems in the Al Hamra region of the Jebel Akhdar Mountains in Oman.

== Ecology ==
Garra barreimiae is a shoaling fish and is quick to dart away if it feels threatened. It is a hardy and adaptable species. If the water body in which it is living is starting to dry up, it may be able to survive buried in wet gravel. It has also been known to skitter across wet rocks in order to move to another pool, and to make its way up steep wet rocks and beside waterfalls. It can tolerate brackish water and a wide range of temperatures.

The fish feeds on the bottom, eating algae which it scrapes off rocks and detritus. Examination of the stomach contents of one individual showed that it had consumed both single-celled and filamentous algae, rotifers, nematodes and small crustaceans. Breeding takes place when there is sufficient water and may be sparked by a downpour. The tiny eggs are deposited among the gravel.
