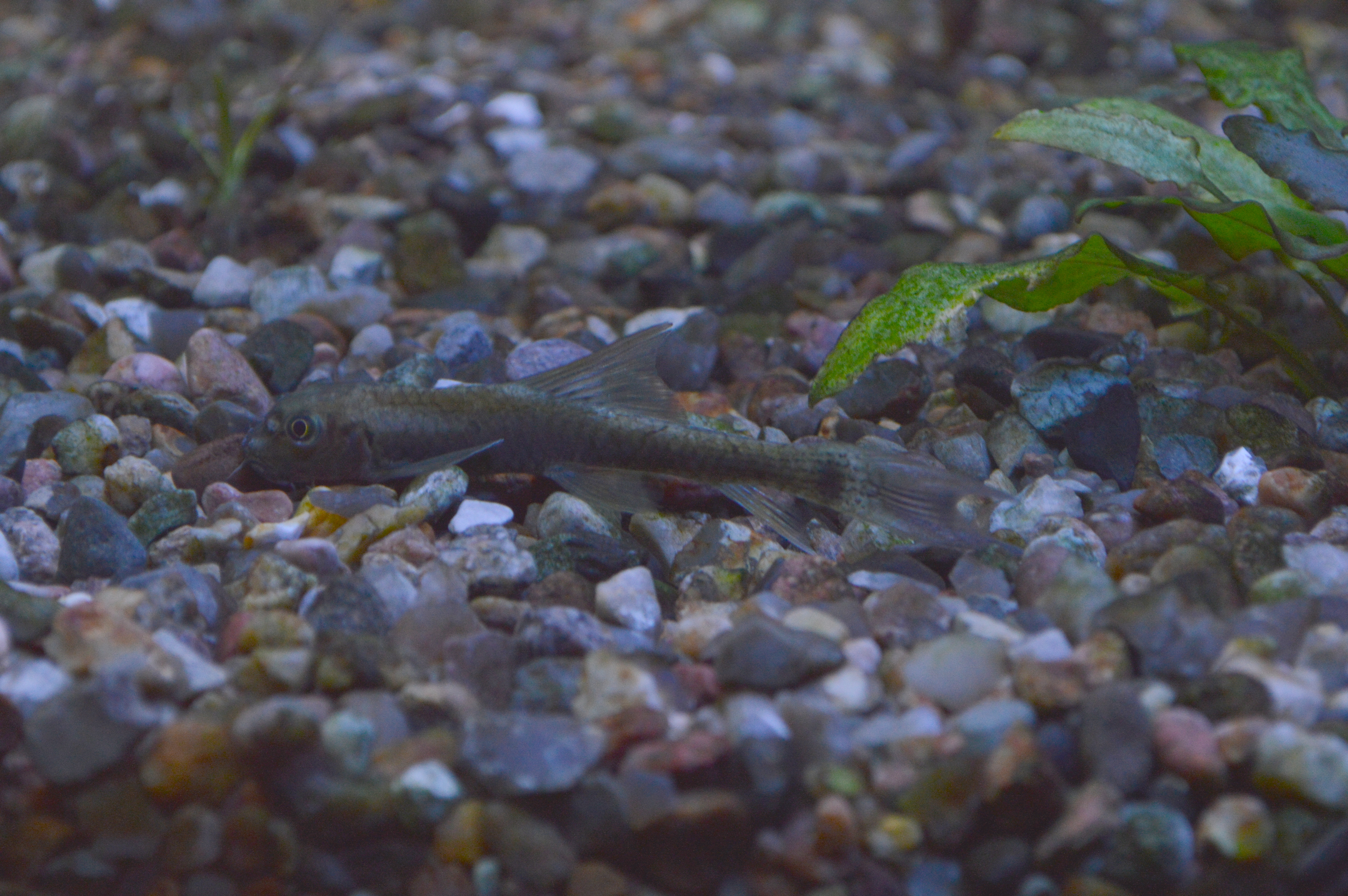

Conservation status
- Least Concern (IUCN 3.1)

Scientific classification
- Kingdom: Animalia
- Phylum: Chordata
- Class: Actinopterygii
- Order: Cypriniformes
- Family: Cyprinidae
- Subfamily: Labeoninae
- Genus: Garra
- Species: G. gotyla

Binomial name
- Garra gotyla (J. E. Gray, 1830)

= Garra gotyla =

Species of fish

Garra gotyla is a species of ray-finned fish in the cyprinid family from freshwater in South Asia.

The species is relatively widespread in South Asia, and reaches a length of 14.5 cm (5.7 in). The former subspecies, G. g. stenorhynchus of the Western Ghats has been elevated to full species status as Garra stenorhynchus.
