= Garra gravelyi =

Conservation status
- Near Threatened (IUCN 3.1)

Scientific classification
- Kingdom: Animalia
- Phylum: Chordata
- Class: Actinopterygii
- Order: Cypriniformes
- Family: Cyprinidae
- Subfamily: Labeoninae
- Genus: Garra
- Species: G. gravelyi

Binomial name
- Garra gravelyi (Annandale, 1919)

Synonyms
- Discognathus gravelyi Annandale, 1919

Species of fish

Garra gravelyi, the Burmese garra, is a species of ray-finned fish in the genus Garra. As well as Burma (Myanmar), it is also found in the Indian states of Mizoram and Manipur.
