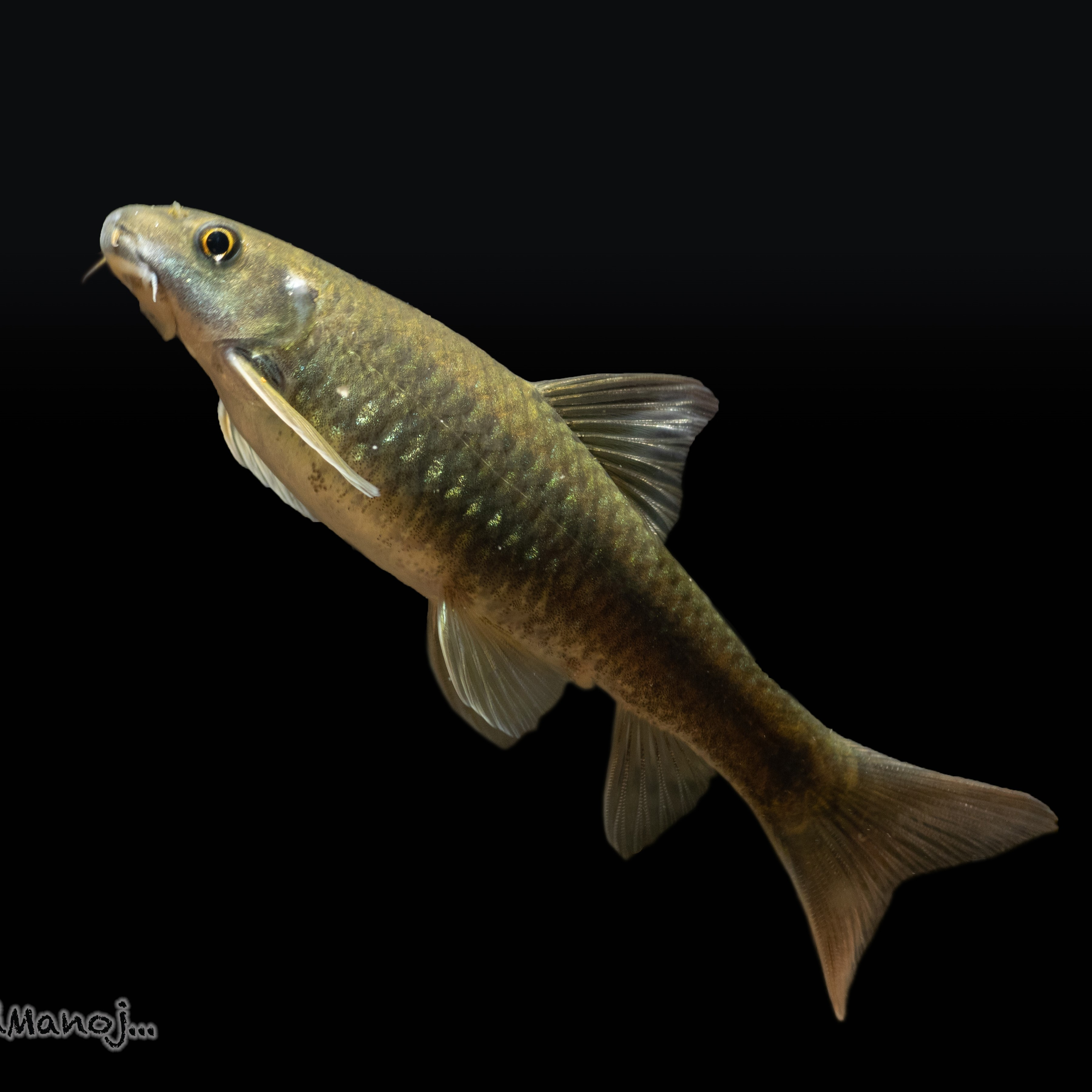

Conservation status
- Least Concern (IUCN 3.1)

Scientific classification
- Domain: Eukaryota
- Kingdom: Animalia
- Phylum: Chordata
- Class: Actinopterygii
- Order: Cypriniformes
- Family: Cyprinidae
- Subfamily: Labeoninae
- Genus: Garra
- Species: G. mcclellandi

Binomial name
- Garra mcclellandi (Jerdon, 1849)

Synonyms
- Gonorhynchus mclellandi Jerdon, 1849; Discognathus elegans Annandale, 1919

= Garra mcclellandi =

Species of fish

Garra mcclellandi, also known as Cauvery garra, is a species of cyprinid fish in the genus Garra which is found in mountain streams in the southern Western Ghats of India.
