= Garra palaniensis =

Conservation status
- Vulnerable (IUCN 3.1)

Scientific classification
- Kingdom: Animalia
- Phylum: Chordata
- Class: Actinopterygii
- Order: Cypriniformes
- Family: Cyprinidae
- Subfamily: Labeoninae
- Genus: Garra
- Species: G. palaniensis

Binomial name
- Garra palaniensis (Rema Devi & Menon, 1994)

Synonyms
- Horalabiosa palaniensis Rema Devi & Menon, 1994

Species of fish

Garra palaniensis is a species of cyprinid fish in the genus Garra endemic to India. It is sometimes placed in the genus Garra.
