= Garra ghorensis =

Jordanian log sucker

Conservation status
- Endangered (IUCN 3.1)

Scientific classification
- Kingdom: Animalia
- Phylum: Chordata
- Class: Actinopterygii
- Order: Cypriniformes
- Family: Cyprinidae
- Genus: Garra
- Species: G. ghorensis

Binomial name
- Garra ghorensis Krupp, 1982
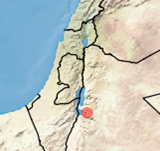

Species of fish

Garra ghorensis, the Jordanian log sucker or Dead Sea garra, is a species of ray-finned fish in the family Cyprinidae. It is native to Israel and Jordan, although it is no longer found in Israel. Its natural habitat is freshwater springs. It is threatened by habitat loss.
