= Garra ornata =

Conservation status
- Least Concern (IUCN 3.1)

Scientific classification
- Kingdom: Animalia
- Phylum: Chordata
- Class: Actinopterygii
- Order: Cypriniformes
- Family: Cyprinidae
- Subfamily: Labeoninae
- Genus: Garra
- Species: G. ornata

Binomial name
- Garra ornata (Nichols & Griscom, 1917)

Synonyms
- Discognathus ornatus Nichols & Griscom, 1917; Discognathus occidentalis Lönnberg & Rendahl (de), 1920; Garra occidentalis (Lönnberg & Rendahl, 1920); Discognathus baudoni Pellegrin, 1923; Garra baudoni (Pellegrin, 1923); Garra trewavasae Monod, 1950

Species of fish

Garra ornata is a species of ray-finned fish in the family Cyprinidae from rivers in West and Central Africa.
