= Garra elongata =

Conservation status
- Near Threatened (IUCN 3.1)

Scientific classification
- Kingdom: Animalia
- Phylum: Chordata
- Class: Actinopterygii
- Order: Cypriniformes
- Family: Cyprinidae
- Subfamily: Labeoninae
- Genus: Garra
- Species: G. elongata

Binomial name
- Garra elongata Vishwanath & Kosygin, 2000

Species of fish

Garra elongata is a species of ray-finned fish in the genus Garra from Manipur in north eastern India and possibly Myanmar.
