= Eidinemacheilus =

Scientific classification
- Kingdom: Animalia
- Phylum: Chordata
- Class: Actinopterygii
- Order: Cypriniformes
- Family: Nemacheilidae
- Genus: Eidinemacheilus; Segherloo, Ghaedrahmati & Freyhof, 2016

Type species
- Noemacheilus smithi Greenwood, 1976

Genus of fishes

Eidinemacheilus is a genus of troglobitic fish in the family Nemacheilidae endemic to Iran and Iraqi Kurdistan.

== Species ==
There are currently 2 recognized species in this genus:

- Eidinemacheilus proudlovei Freyhof, Abdullah, Ararat, Ibrahim & Geiger, 2016
- Eidinemacheilus smithi (Greenwood, 1976) (Zagroz blind loach)
