= Garra kemali =

Conservation status
- Endangered (IUCN 3.1)

Scientific classification
- Kingdom: Animalia
- Phylum: Chordata
- Class: Actinopterygii
- Order: Cypriniformes
- Family: Cyprinidae
- Subfamily: Labeoninae
- Genus: Garra
- Species: G. kemali

Binomial name
- Garra kemali (Hankó, 1925)

Synonyms
- Hemigrammocapoeta kemali Hankó, 1925

Species of fish

Garra kemali is a species of cyprinid fish, which is found only in Turkey, in swamps and freshwater lakes. It is threatened by a habitat loss.

Previously considered as Hemigrammocapoeta kemali, molecular data have indicated that the species should belong to the genus Garra.
