= Lalnuntluanga =

Indian cricketer (born 1986)

Personal information
- Born: 26 July 1986 (age 40)
- Source: ESPNcricinfo, 3 October 2019

Lalnuntluanga (born 26 July 1986) is an Indian cricketer. He made his List A debut on 19 September 2018, for Mizoram in the 2018–19 Vijay Hazare Trophy.
