= Garra lorestanensis =

Scientific classification
- Kingdom: Animalia
- Phylum: Chordata
- Class: Actinopterygii
- Order: Cypriniformes
- Family: Cyprinidae
- Subfamily: Labeoninae
- Genus: Garra
- Species: G. lorestanensis

Binomial name
- Garra lorestanensis (Mousavi-Sabet & Eagderi, 2016)

Species of fish

Garra lorestanensis is a species of ray-finned fish in the genus Garra known from the Loven Cave, the natural outlet of a subterranean limestone system of the Zagros Mountains in the Ab-e Sirum or Ab-e Serum Valley near Tang-e Haft railway station, the Tigris River drainage, the Persian Gulf Basin, Lorestan Province, southwestern Iran.

== Etymology ==
The species name lorestanensis, treated as an adjective, is derived from Lorestan Province, where the Loven cave is located.
