= Garra tashanensis =

Scientific classification
- Kingdom: Animalia
- Phylum: Chordata
- Class: Actinopterygii
- Order: Cypriniformes
- Family: Cyprinidae
- Subfamily: Labeoninae
- Genus: Garra
- Species: G. tashanensis

Binomial name
- Garra tashanensis Mousavi-Sabet, Vatandoust, Fatemi & Eagderi, 2016

Species of fish

Garra tashanensis is a species of ray-finned fish in the genus Garra. This cavefish is endemic to the Tashan Cave located in the Tashan region of Khuzestan Province, Iran.

== Description ==
Garra tashanensis lacks pigment and eyes, its anterior body has few scales.

== Etymology ==
The species tashanensis is named after Tashan region, where the Tashan Cave is located.
