= Eric Godwin Silas =

Sri Lankan-Indian ichthyologist (1928–2018)

Eric Godwin Silas (10 January 1928 – 27 April 2018) was a Sri Lanka born zoologist and marine biologist who worked in Kerala. He served as a director of the Central Marine Fisheries Research Institute, founder director of the Salim Ali Centre for Ornithology and Natural History and as a vice chancellor of Kerala Agricultural University.

Silas was born in Demodehera, Ceylon, and went to school in Trivandrum at the St. Joseph's English High School and later at the American Mission College in Madurai. He graduated with a BSc from Madras Christian College with a dissertation done under the guidance of Sunder Lal Hora, then director of the Zoological Survey of India. He received a PhD in 1954 and a DSc from Madras University in 1972.

He conducted ichthyology surveys in the hill river systems of the Western Ghats, the Tapti and also the lakes of the Himalayas. He revised the taxa from the Asian region and examined Hora's Satpura Hypothesis. He worked as a marine biologist at Mandapam in 1963 and also served as a scientist and curator for the Bombay Natural History Society. He conducted several collecting trips in the Indian seas aboard the RV Varuna. He also worked on the US research vessel Anton Bruun in 1964 and Korean fishing vessel MV Al Sarawat. He served as a director of the Central Marine Fisheries Research Institute from 1975 where he also established a museum of marine biology. He helped begin the master's program in mariculture at CMFRI in 1979. He was the founder chairman of the Salim Ali Centre for Ornithology and Natural History when it was created in 1991. In 1987 he served as the vice chancellor of the Kerala Agricultural University.
