= Blind fish =

Fish without functional eyes

A blind fish is a fish without functional eyes. Most blind fish species are found in dark habitats such as the deep ocean, deep river channels and underground.

== Blind fish species ==
=== Agnathans ===
- Myxine glutinosa
- Myxine circifrons
- Polistotrema stouti

=== Cartilaginous fishes ===
- Torpediniformes
  - Benthobatis moresbyi
  - Typhlonarke aysoni
  - Typhlonarke tarakea

=== Bony fishes ===
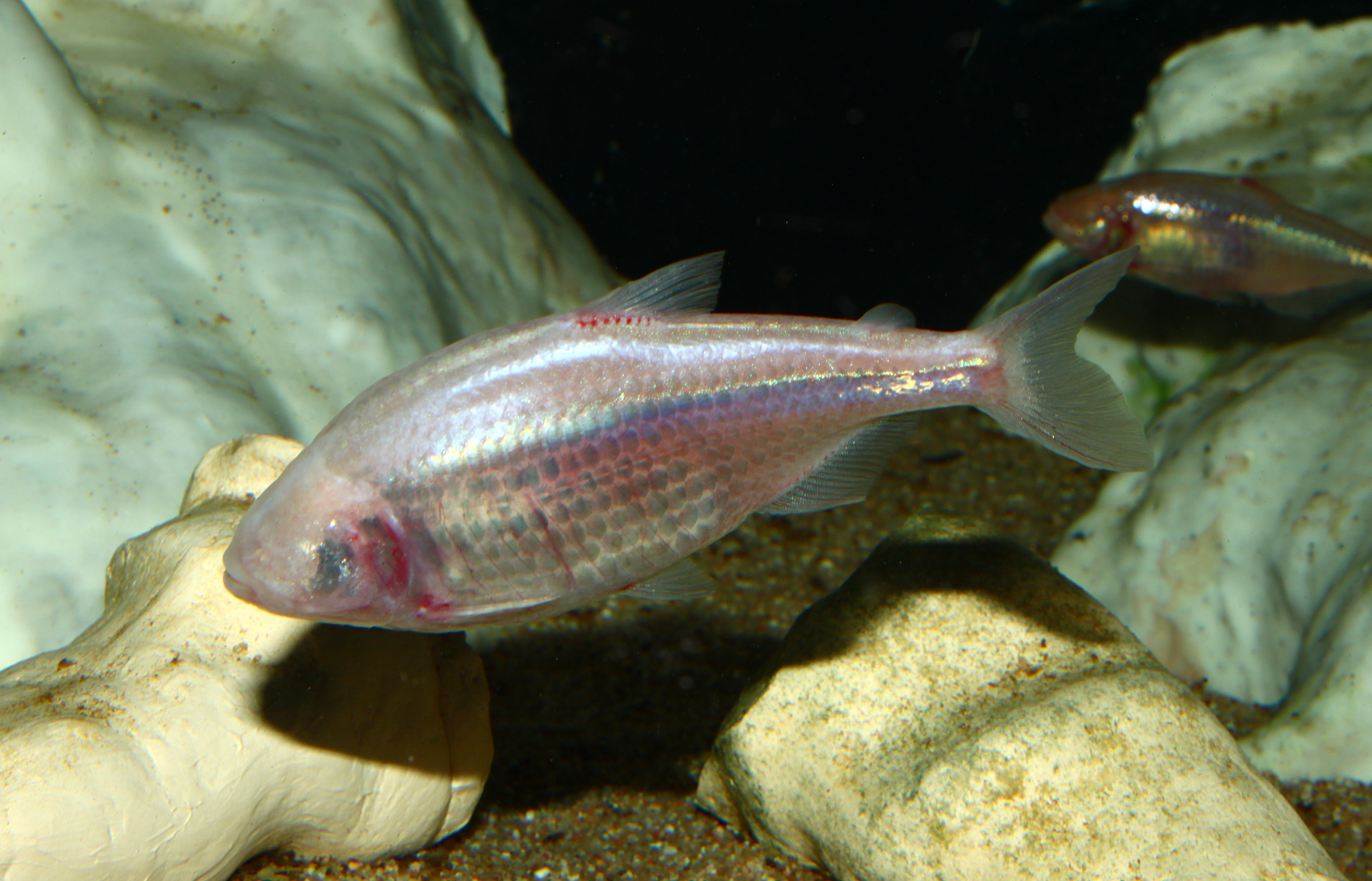
Astyanax jordani

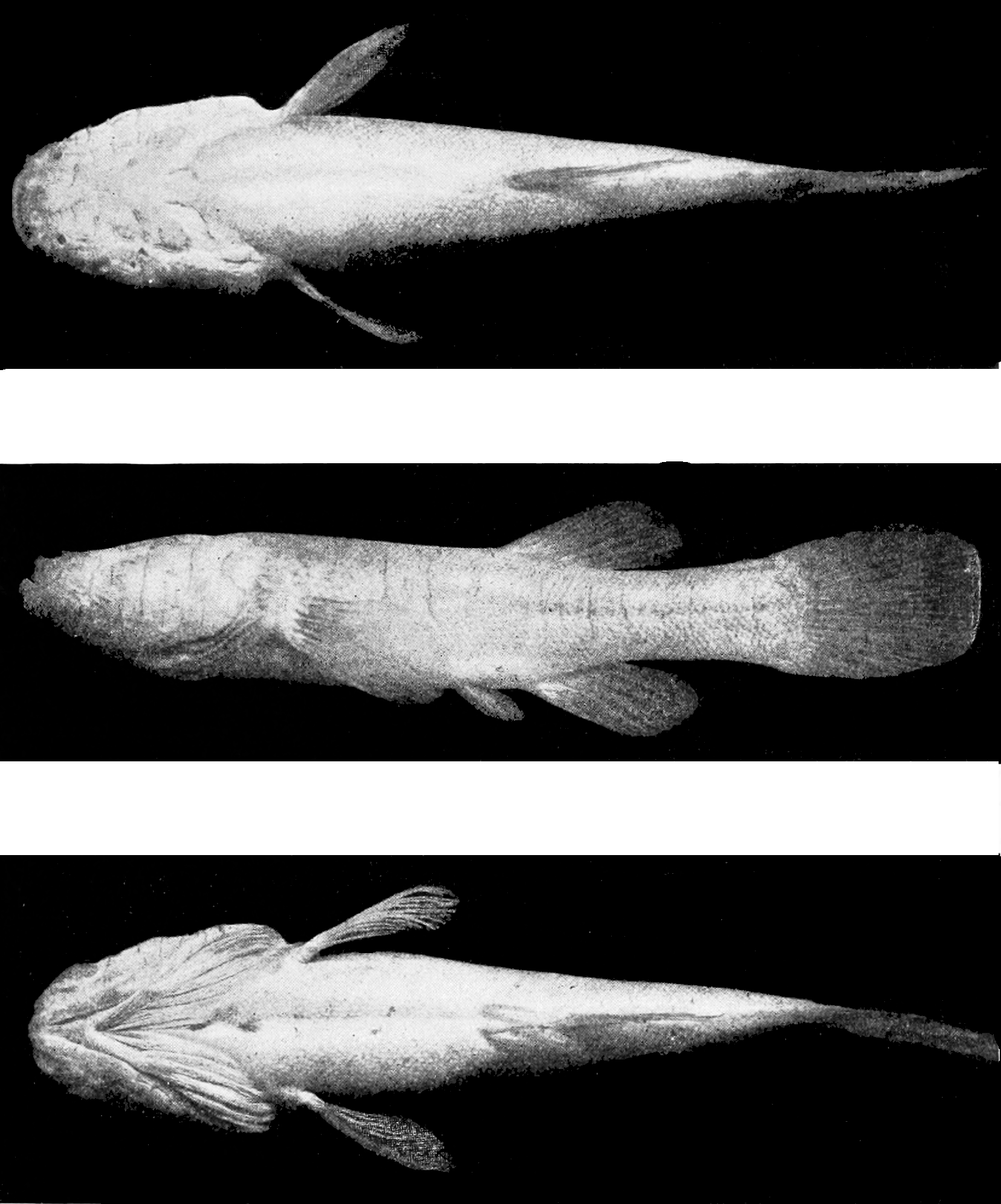
Amblyopsis sp.

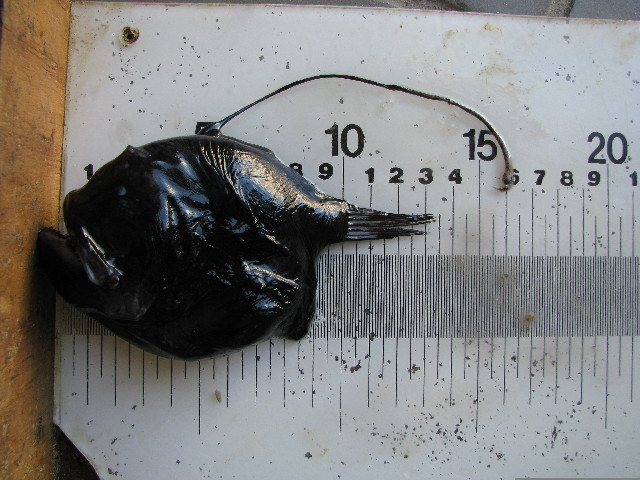
Bufoceratias wedli

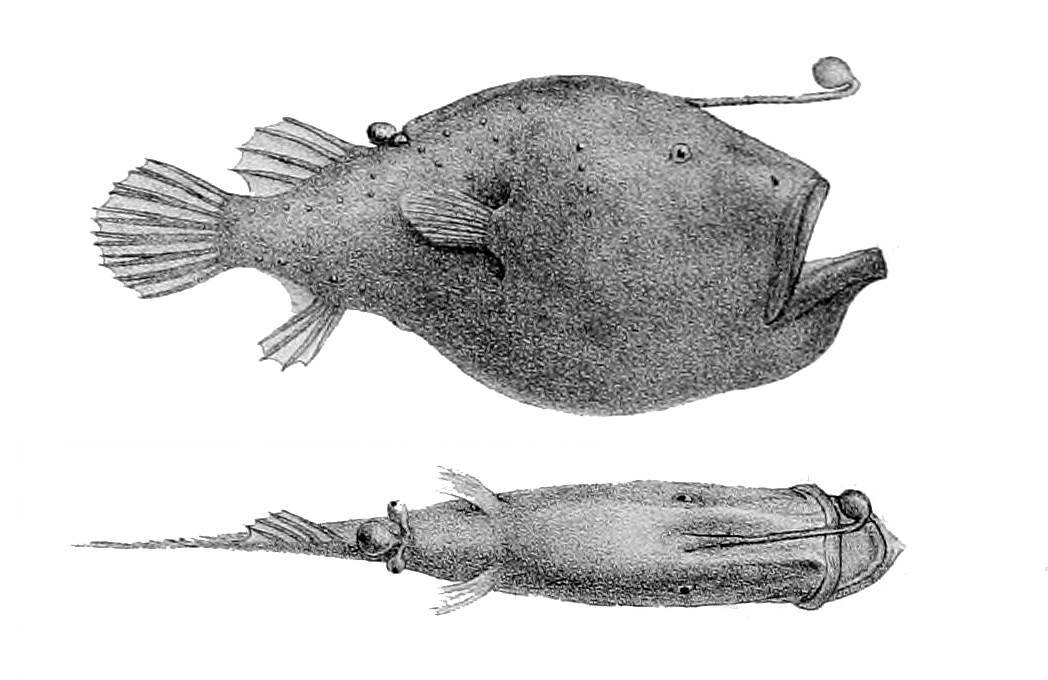
Cryptopsaras couesii

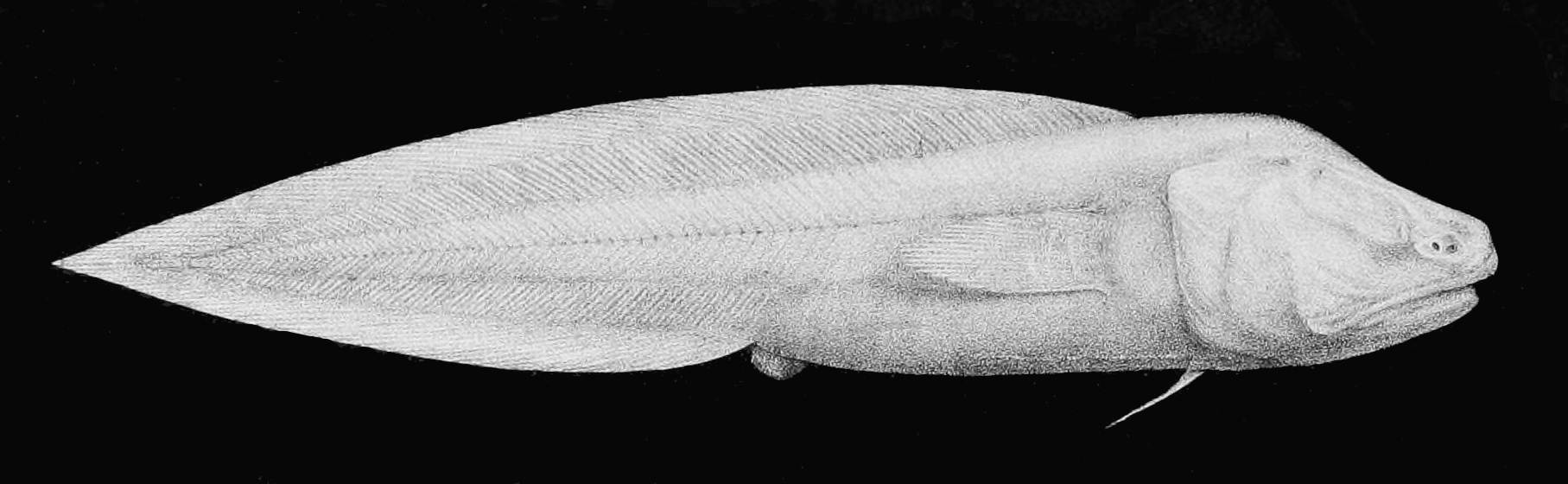
Aphyonus gelatinosus

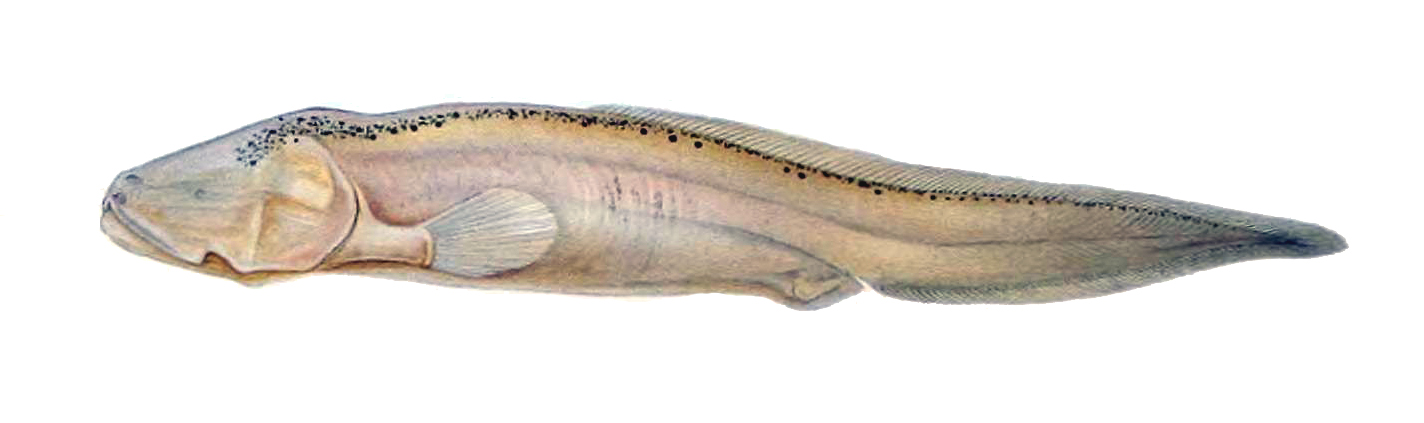
Sciadonus cryptophthalmus

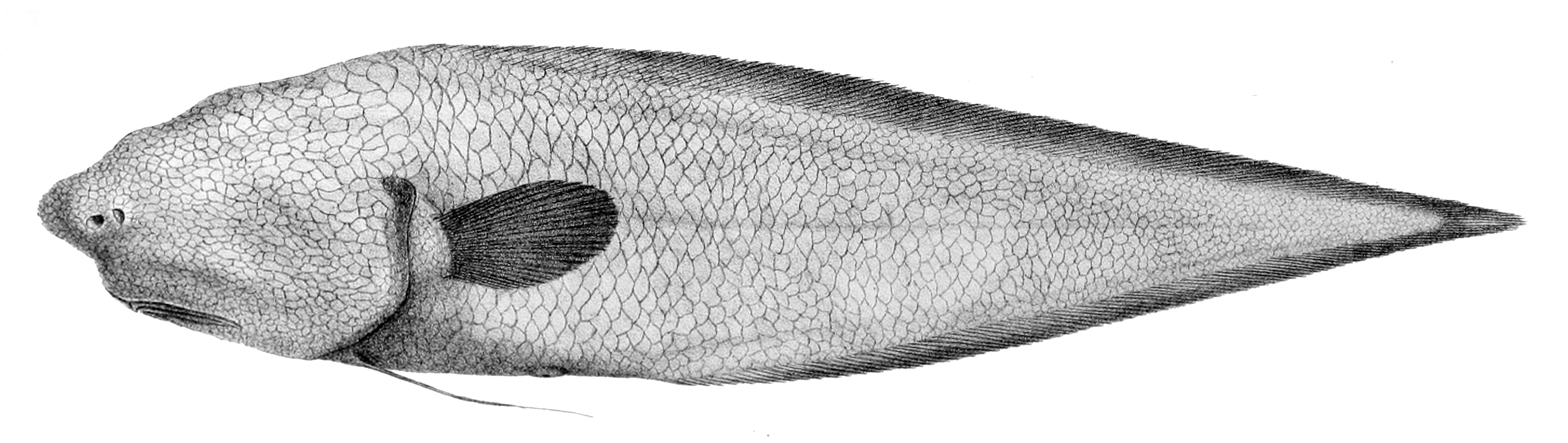
Typhlonus nasus

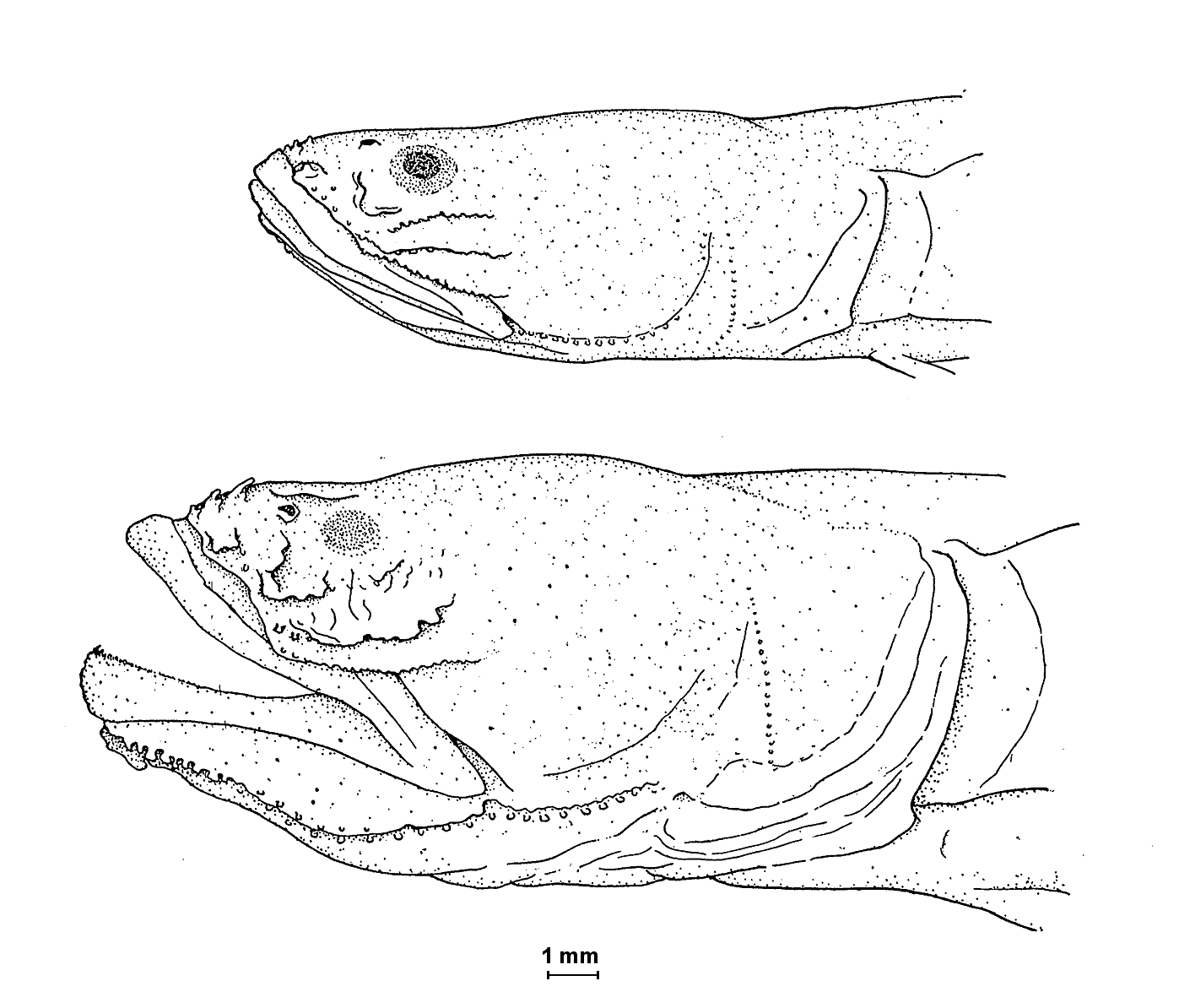
Lethops connectens

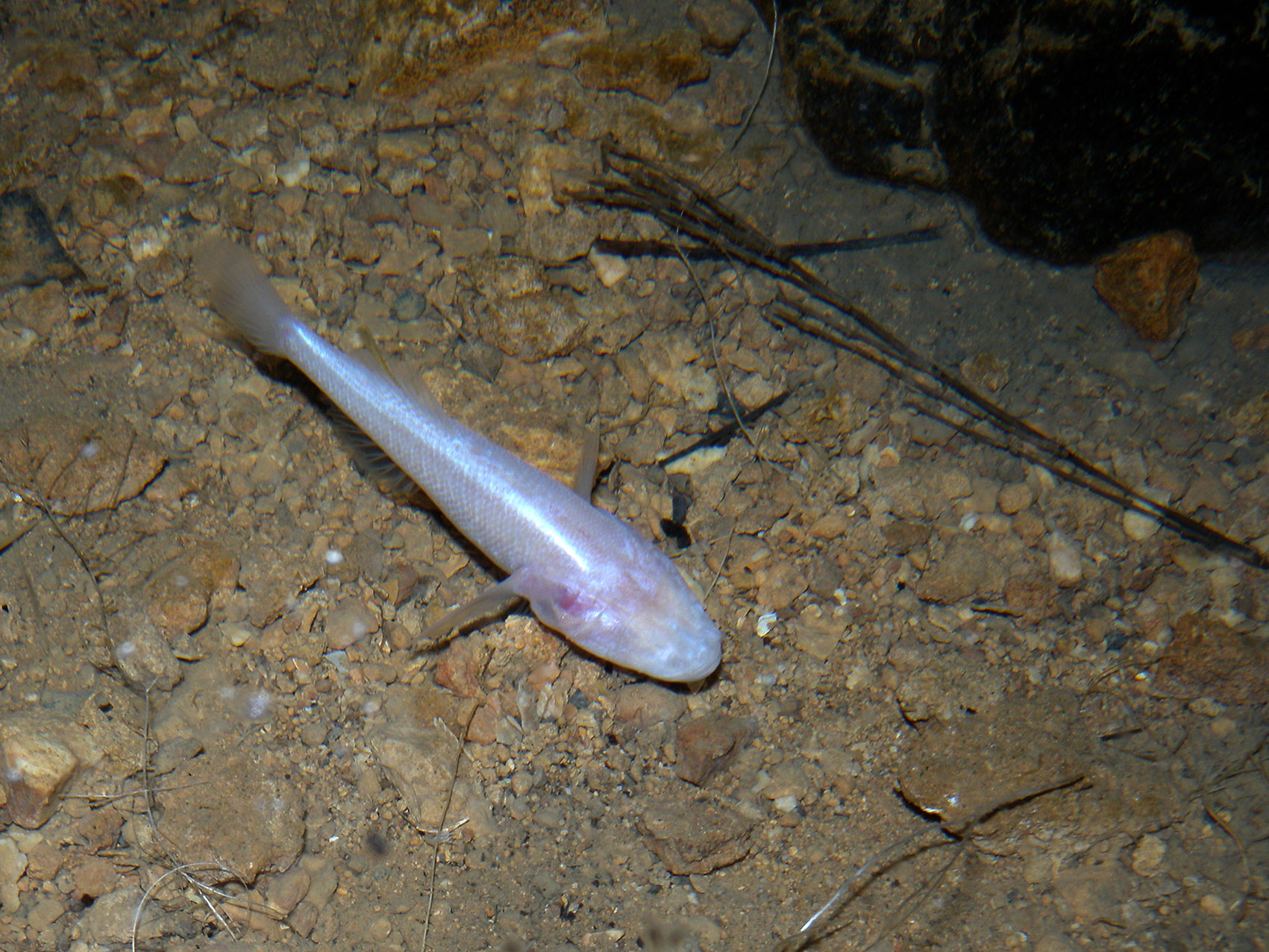
Typhleotris madagascariensis

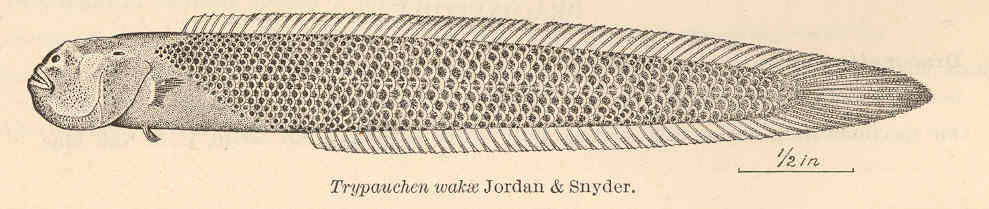
Trypauchen vagina

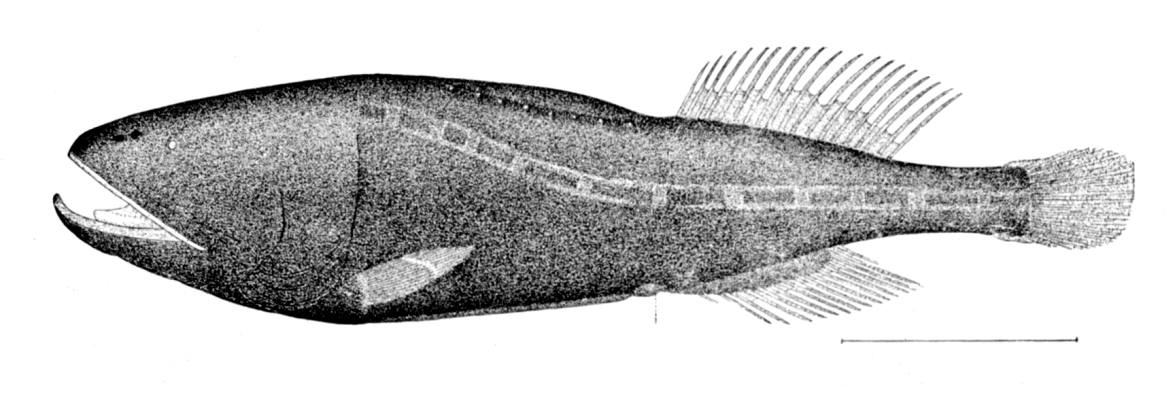
Ditropichthys storeri

- Anguilliformes
  - Moringuidae
    - Moringua abbreviata
- Salmoniformes
  - Ipnopidae
    - Ipnops murrayi
    - Ipnops agassizi
    - Ipnops meadi
    - Bathymicrops regis
    - Bathymicrops brevianalis
    - Bathyphlops sewelli
- Characiformes
  - Characidae
    - Astyanax jordani
    - Anoptichthys antrobius
    - Stygichthys typhlops
- Cypriniformes
  - Cyprinidae
    - Caecobarbus geertsii
    - Barbopsis devecchii
    - Iranocypris typhlops
    - Phreatichthys andruzzii
    - Typhlogarra widdowsoni
    - Puntius microps
    - Sinocyclocheilus anophthalmus
  - Cobitidae
    - Cryptotora thamicola
    - Nemacheilus troglocataractus
    - Nemacheilus starostini
    - Schistura spiesi
    - Schistura oedipus
    - Schistura deansmarti
    - Schistura kaysonei
    - Oreonectes anophthalmus
    - Heminoemacheilus hyalinus
- Percopsiformes
  - Amblyopsidae
    - Amblyopsis rosae
    - Amblyopsis spelaea
    - Chologaster cornuta
    - Forbesichthys agassizii
    - Speoplatyrhinus poulsoni
    - Typhlichthys subterraneus
- Siluriformes
  - Ictaluridae
    - Prietella phreatophila
    - Prietella lundbergi
    - Satan eurystomus
    - Trogloglanis pattersoni
  - Trichomycteridae
    - Cetopsis caecutiens
    - Pareiodon microps
    - Phreatobius cisternarum
    - Phreatobius dracunculus
    - Phreatobius sanguijuela
  - Pimelodidae
    - Caecorhamdia urichi
    - Caecorhamdella brasiliensis
    - Pimelodella kronei
  - Clariidae
    - Channallabes apus
    - Dolichallabes microphthalmus
    - Gymnallabes tihoni
    - Horaglanis krishnai
    - Uegitglanis zammaranoi
    - Typhlichthys subterraneus
- Lophiiformes
  - Diceratiidae
    - Bufoceratias wedli
  - Neoceratiidae
    - Neoceratias spinifer
  - Ceratiidae
    - Cryptopsaras couesii
    - Ceratias holboelli
- Ophidiiformes
  - Aphyonidae
    - Aphyonus gelatinosus
    - Aphyonus mollis
    - Barathronus bicolor
    - Barathronus parfaiti
    - Barathronus affinis
    - Barathronus diaphanus
    - Meteoria erythrops
  - Bythitidae
    - Ogilbia galapagosensis
    - Dermatopsis macrodon
    - Dipulus caecus
  - Ophidiidae
    - Acanthonus hextii
    - Leucicorus lusciosus
    - Leucochlamys cryptophthalmus
    - Leucochlamys jonassoni
    - Lucifuca subterraneus
    - Monothrix polylepis
    - Sciadonus pedicellaris
    - Sciadonus kullenbergi
    - Sciadonus cryptophthalmus
    - Typhliasina pearsi
    - Typhlonus nasus
- Synbranchiformes
  - Synbranchidae
    - Ophisternon candidum
    - Macrotrema caligans
    - Ophisternon bengalense
    - Ophisternon infernale
    - Monopterus boueti
  - Mastacembelidae
    - Mastacembelus brichardi
- Perciformes
  - Gobiidae
    - Caragobius urolepis
    - Lethops connectens
    - Luciogobius albus
    - Milyeringa veritas
    - Typhleotris madagascariensis
    - Caragobius urolepis
  - Gobioididae
    - Brachyamblyopus brachysoma
    - Brachyamblyopus multiradiatus
    - Brachyamblyopus coectus
    - Brachyamblyopus urolepis
    - Brachyamblyopus intermedius
    - Taenioides cirratus
    - Taenioides eruptionis
    - Taenioides anguillaris
    - Taenioidesrubicundus
    - Trypauchen vagina
    - Trypauchen raha
    - Trypauchen taenia
    - Trypauchenichthys sumatrensis
    - Trypauchenichthys typus
    - Paratrypauchen microcephalus
- Pleuronectiformes
  - Soleidae
    - Typhlachirus caecus
    - Typhlachirus elongatus
    - Typhlachirus lipophthalmus
- Cetomimiformes
  - Cetominidae
    - Ditropichthys storeri

== See also ==
- Troglofauna
