= Oxyropsis carinata =

Conservation status
- Least Concern (IUCN 3.1)

Scientific classification
- Kingdom: Animalia
- Phylum: Chordata
- Class: Actinopterygii
- Order: Siluriformes
- Family: Loricariidae
- Genus: Oxyropsis
- Species: O. carinata

Binomial name
- Oxyropsis carinata (Steindachner, 1879)

Synonyms
- Hypoptopoma carinatum Steindachner, 1879

Species of fish

Oxyropsis carinata is a species of freshwater ray-finned fish belonging to the family Loricariidae, the suckermouth armored catfishes, and the subfamily Hypoptopomatinae, the cascudinhos. This catfish is found in South America, where it is found in the Amazon basin.

== Taxonomy ==
Oxyropsis carinata was first formally described as Hypoptopoma carinatum in 1879 by the Austrian ichthyologist Franz Steindachner with its type locality given as "tributaries of the Amazon at the border of Peru". This catfish is now classified in the genus Oxyropsis which is within the subfamily Hypoptopomatinae and which was formerly considered to be a junior synonym of Hypoptopoma, until restored as a valid genus in 2002 by Adriana E. Aquino and Scott A. Schaefer.

== Etymology ==
Oxyropsis carinata is one of three valid species in the genus Oxyropsis, the name of which combines oxys, meaning "sharp" or "pointed", with opsis, which means "face" or "appearance". The describers of the genus, C. H. Eigenmann and R. S. Eignemann, did not explain this but it is thought to refer to the depressed head of the type species, O. wrightiana. The specific name, carinata, means "keeled", an allusion to the serrated ridge along the sides of this species.

== Description ==
Oxyropsis carinata, and O. wrightiana, are distinguished from O. acutirostris, by have a complete series of 25 or 26 plates along the middle of the flank, a deeper caudal peduncle; having more than 15 teeth on the premaxilla and the mandible; the possession of well developed serra on the spine of the pectoral fin with the serrae being less than a third in height as the thickness of the spine. It is distinguished from O. wrightiana by having longer serra on the pectoral fin spine and the serrae are spread along the whole length of the spine. There are between 25 and 35 teeth on the mandible. The last four plates on the flank have 5 or 6 rows of odontodes above and below the midlateral row of enlarged odontodes. This species reaches a standard length of 7.6 cm (3.0 in).

== Distribution and habitat ==
Oxyropsis carinata is found in the upper Amazon basin and lower Rio Negro in Bolivia, Brazil, Colombia and Peru. It is a demersal species found in rivers.
