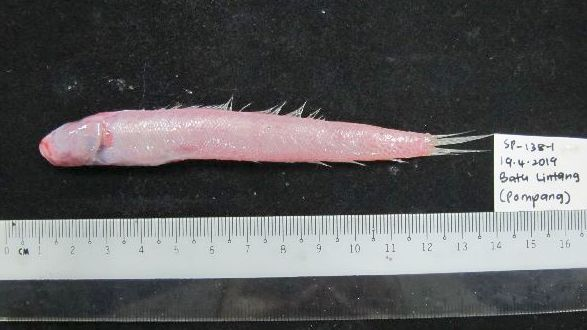

Scientific classification
- Domain: Eukaryota
- Kingdom: Animalia
- Phylum: Chordata
- Class: Actinopterygii
- Order: Gobiiformes
- Family: Oxudercidae
- Genus: Trypauchen
- Species: T. pelaeos

Binomial name
- Trypauchen pelaeos Murdy, 2006

= Trypauchen pelaeos =

Species of fish

Trypauchen pelaeos is a species of eel goby found in Indochina and southern China. It is reddish in color and has an elongated body with the anal, caudal, and the two dorsal fins fused together with membranous structures. It is similar in appearance and habits to the closely related burrowing goby, Trypauchen vagina.

T. pelaeos was first described by Edward O. Murdy in 2006. The generic name is derived from Ancient Greek τρύπα (trupa, "hole") and αυχενος (aukhenos, "neck"). The specific name means "mud-dweller", from πηλός (pélos, "mud").
