= Odontamblyopus roseus =

Scientific classification
- Kingdom: Animalia
- Phylum: Chordata
- Class: Actinopterygii
- Order: Gobiiformes
- Family: Oxudercidae
- Genus: Odontamblyopus
- Species: O. roseus

Binomial name
- Odontamblyopus roseus (Valenciennes, 1837)

Synonyms
- Amblyopus roseus Valenciennes, 1837

Species of fish

Odontamblyopus roseus is a species of eel goby native to the coastal waters along the west coast of India. This species can reach a length of 13.4 centimetres (5.3 in) SL. Unlike other members of this genus, this species does not have any muscles extending to the top of the skull.
