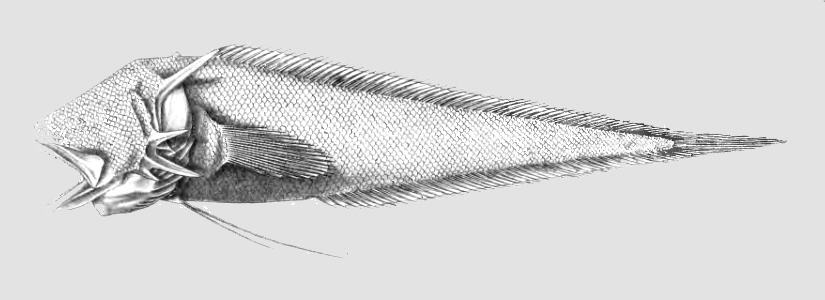

Conservation status
- Least Concern (IUCN 3.1)

Scientific classification
- Kingdom: Animalia
- Phylum: Chordata
- Class: Actinopterygii
- Division: Teleostei
- Order: Ophidiiformes
- Family: Acanthonidae
- Genus: Acanthonus
- Species: A. hextii

Binomial name
- Acanthonus hextii (Alcock, 1890)

Synonyms
- Tauredophidium hextii

= Acanthonus hextii =

Species of fish

Acanthonus hextii is a species of cusk-eel found in the Indian and western Pacific Oceans. It occurs at depths of from 1,500 to 2,660 metres (4,920 to 8,730 ft). This species grows to a length of 10.5 centimetres (4.1 in) SL. It is sometimes classified as a monotypic genus Tauredophidium.

== Etymology ==
The specific name honours Rear-Admiral John Hext (1842-1924) who was commander of the Royal Indian Marine who supported the expedition in board the R.I.M.S. Investigator in the Arabian Sea which collected the type specimen. Only one larval specimen has been identified and was similar in overall form to the related bony-eared assfish and gargoyle cusk, with multiple elongate pectoral-fin rays
