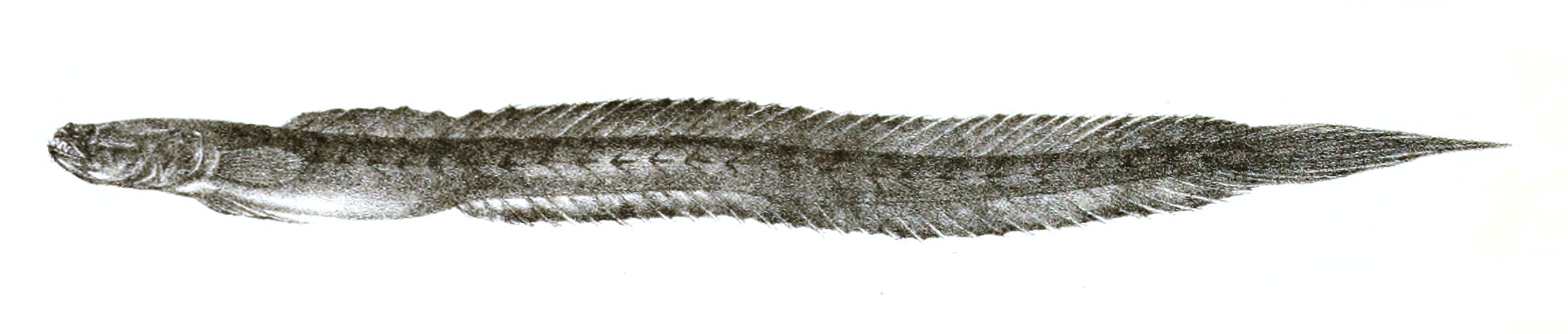

Scientific classification
- Kingdom: Animalia
- Phylum: Chordata
- Class: Actinopterygii
- Order: Gobiiformes
- Family: Oxudercidae
- Genus: Odontamblyopus
- Species: O. tenuis

Binomial name
- Odontamblyopus tenuis (F. Day, 1876)

Synonyms
- Gobioides tenuis F. Day, 1876

= Odontamblyopus tenuis =

Species of fish

Odontamblyopus tenuis is a species of eel goby native to fresh, brackish and marine coastal waters from Pakistan and Myanmar. This species can reach a length of 12.8 centimetres (5.0 in) SL.
