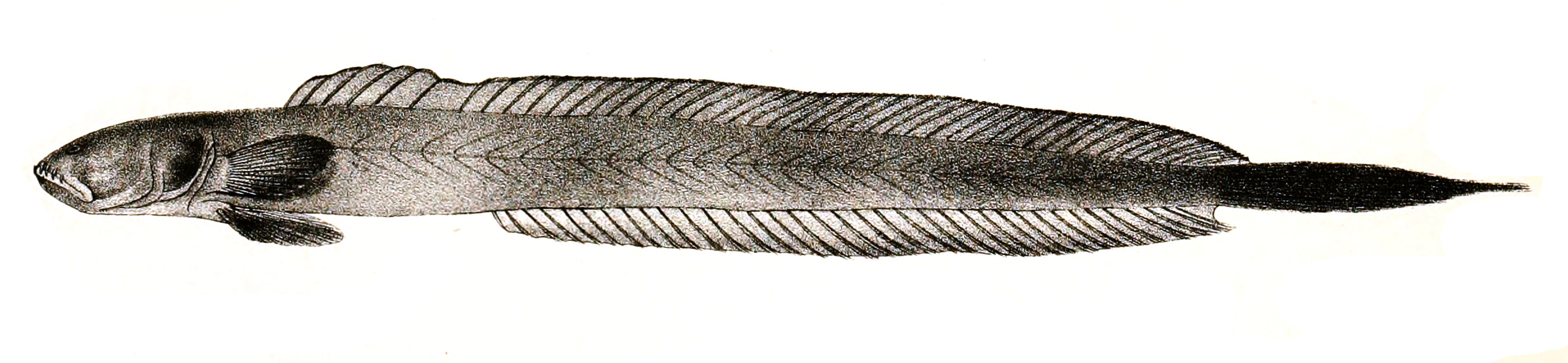

Scientific classification
- Kingdom: Animalia
- Phylum: Chordata
- Class: Actinopterygii
- Order: Gobiiformes
- Family: Oxudercidae
- Genus: Odontamblyopus
- Species: O. rubicundus

Binomial name
- Odontamblyopus rubicundus (F. Hamilton, 1822)

Synonyms
- Gobioides rubicundus F. Hamilton, 1822; Taenioides rubicundus (F. Hamilton, 1822); Amblyopus mayenna Valenciennes, 1837; Amblyopus taenia Günther, 1861

= Odontamblyopus rubicundus =

Species of fish

Odontamblyopus rubicundus is a species of eel goby native to coastal waters and estuaries from the east coast of India to Myanmar and Bangladesh. This species can reach a length of 25 centimetres (9.8 in) TL. It is of minor importance to local commercial fisheries.

== Habitats ==
This species found on freshwater and estuary in Bangladesh.They also found in Dakatia river and the Sundarbans of Bangladesh.
