= Oxyropsis =

Scientific classification
- Kingdom: Animalia
- Phylum: Chordata
- Class: Actinopterygii
- Order: Siluriformes
- Family: Loricariidae
- Subfamily: Hypoptopomatinae
- Genus: Oxyropsis; C. H. Eigenmann & R. S. Eigenmann, 1889

Type species
- Oxyropsis wrightiana C. H. Eigenmann & R. S. Eigenmann, 1889

Genus of fishes

Oxyropsis is a genus of freshwater ray-finned fishes belonging to the family Loricariidae, the suckermouth armored catfishes, and the subfamily Hypoptopomatinae, the cascudinhos. The catfishes in this genus are found in South America.

== Taxonomy ==
Oxyropsis was first proposed as a monospecific genus in 1889 by the ichthyologists Carl H. Eigenmann and Rosa Smith Eigenmann when they described O. wrightiana, which they also designated as its type species. The Eigenmanns gave the type locality of this species as Lake Hyanuary in the Brazilian state of Amazonas. The holotype was collected in 1865 by Louis Agassiz when he participated in the Thayer Expedition to Brazil. Oxyropsis is classified in the subfamily Hypoptopomatinae, known as cascudinhos, within the suckermouth armored catfish family Loricariidae, which is part of the suborder Loricarioidei within the catfish order Siluriformes. Oxyropisis was reduced to a synonym of Hypoptopoma by Charles Tate Regan in 1904 as he regarded O. wrightiana as synonymous with Hypoptopoma carinatum, the validity of the genus was reconfirmed in 2002.

== Species ==
Oxyropsis' contains the following valid species:

- Oxyropsis acutirostris P. Miranda-Ribeiro, 1951
- Oxyropsis carinata (Steindachner, 1879)
- Oxyropsis wrightiana C. H. Eigenmann & R. S. Eigenmann, 1889

== Etymology ==
Oxyropsis combines oxys, meaning "sharp" or "pointed", with opsis, which means "face" or "appearance". The Eigenmanns did not explain this but it is thought to refer to the depressed head of the type species.

== Characteristics ==
These species are distinguished by the presence of a single row of enlarged odontodes along the trunk midline lying adjacent and immediately dorsal to, the lateral line canal. Species of this genus have a depressed head and have relatively large eyes placed ventrolaterally. This genus is most similar to Hypoptopoma in external appearance, which shares the head shape and eye placement. Oxyropsis are elongate and have a narrow caudal peduncle, which distinguishes it from all other Hypoptopomatinae genera except Niobichthys and Acestridium.

The species of Oxyropsis are distinguished based on their armor plate formation, numbers of plates and teeth, relative depth of the caudal peduncle, development of serrae on the pectoral fin spine. Males have a genital papilla. The catfishes in this genus vary in standard length from 4.4 cm (1.7 in), for O. acutirostris, to 7.6 cm (3.0 in), in the case of O. carinata.

== Distribution ==
Oxyropsis catfishes are found in South America where they occur in the Amazon and Orinoco basins.
