= Odontamblyopus rebecca =

Scientific classification
- Domain: Eukaryota
- Kingdom: Animalia
- Phylum: Chordata
- Class: Actinopterygii
- Order: Gobiiformes
- Family: Oxudercidae
- Genus: Odontamblyopus
- Species: O. rebecca

Binomial name
- Odontamblyopus rebecca Murdy & Shibukawa, 2003

Species of fish

Odontamblyopus rebecca is a species of eel goby native to marine and brackish waters of Vietnam. This species can reach a length of 14.1 centimetres (5.6 in) SL. This species is mostly known from several specimens collected from a fish market in Haiphong, Vietnam.

== Etymology ==
The specific name honours Edward O. Murdy's wife Rebecca Rootes.
