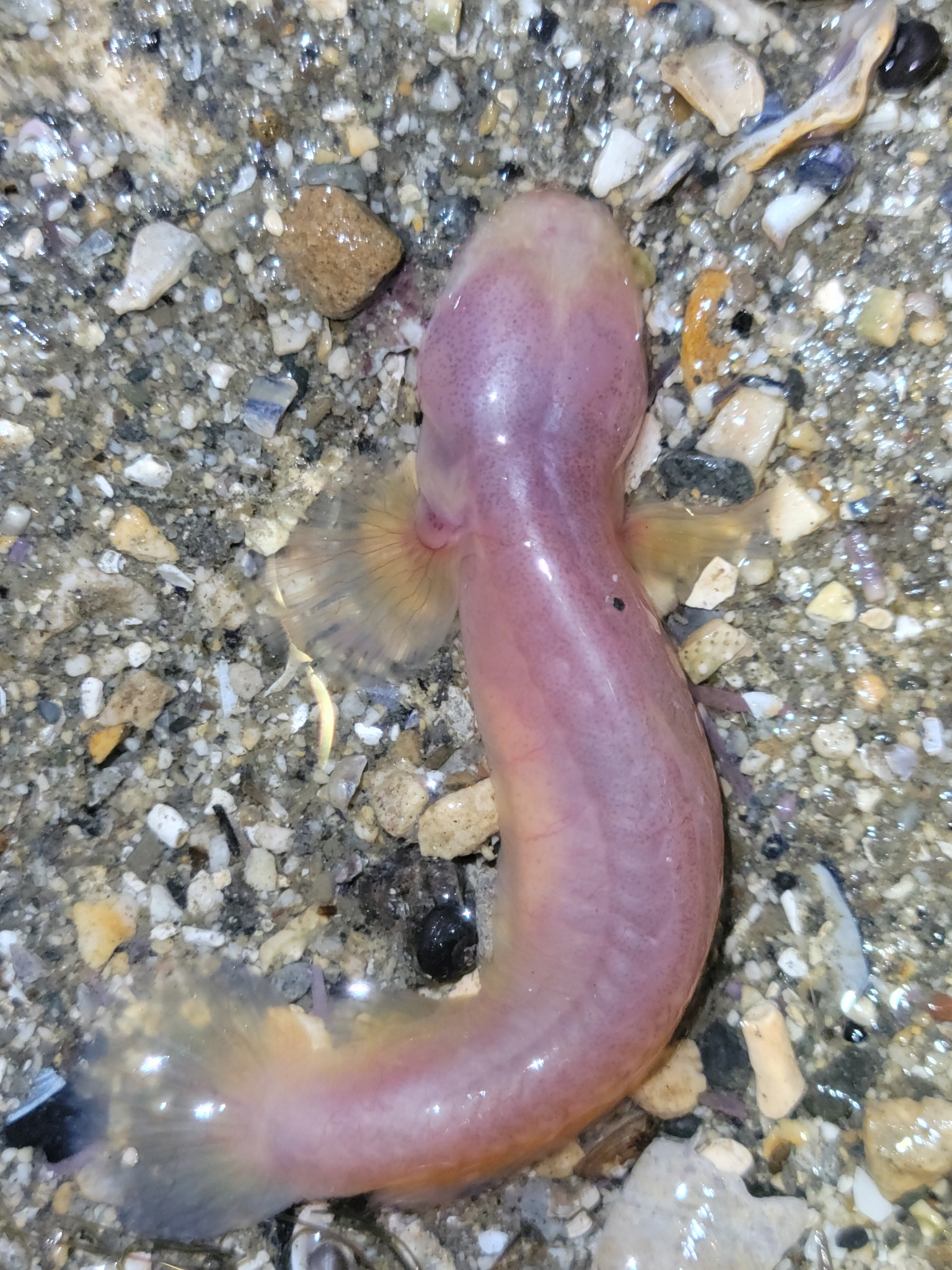

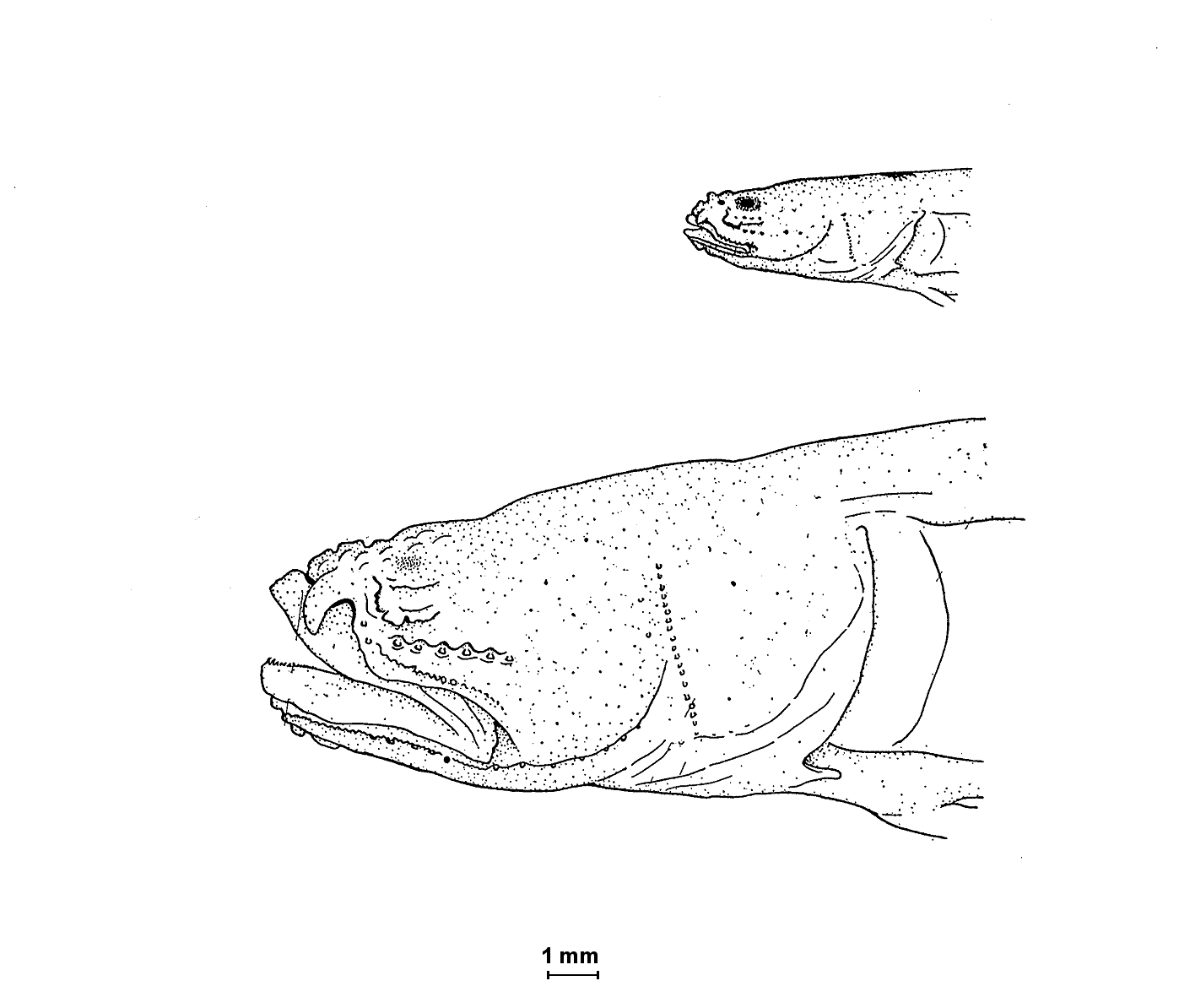
- Heads of juvenile (top) and adult (bottom)

Conservation status
- Least Concern (IUCN 3.1)

Scientific classification
- Kingdom: Animalia
- Phylum: Chordata
- Class: Actinopterygii
- Order: Gobiiformes
- Family: Oxudercidae
- Genus: Typhlogobius; Steindachner, 1879
- Species: T. californiensis

Binomial name
- Typhlogobius californiensis Steindachner, 1879

Synonyms
- Othonops eos R. S. Eigenmann, 1881

= Blind goby =

Species of fish

The blind goby (Typhlogobius californiensis) is a species of fish in the goby family Oxudercidae, the only species in the genus Typhlogobius. It is native to the coastlines of southern California in the United States and Baja California in Mexico, where it commonly inhabits the burrows of shrimp of the genus Callianassa. Mate guarding is a behavior observed in the blind goby species, specifically the male sex, which may benefit their offspring by being cautious of potential predators. Blind gobies are observed to be omnivores feeding on invertebrates like crustaceans. The adult of the species is completely blind and lacks pigmentation, while the juvenile has rudimentary eyes that help it find the shrimp burrows. This species can reach a length of 8.3 centimetres (3.3 in) TL.

== See also ==
- Halfblind goby
- Blind fish
