= Trypauchenopsis =

Conservation status
- Least Concern (IUCN 3.1)

Scientific classification
- Kingdom: Animalia
- Phylum: Chordata
- Class: Actinopterygii
- Division: Teleostei
- Order: Gobiiformes
- Family: Oxudercidae
- Subfamily: Amblyopinae
- Genus: Trypauchenopsis
- Species: T. intermedia

Binomial name
- Trypauchenopsis intermedia Volz, 1903

Synonyms
- Brachyamblyopus intermedius (Volz, 1903)

Species of fish

Trypauchenopsis intermedia, the bearded eel goby, is a species of goby native to fresh waters from the Atlantic coast of South Africa to the Pacific island of Guam. This species grows to a length of 9.5 centimetres (3.7 in) TL. This species is the only known member of its genus.
