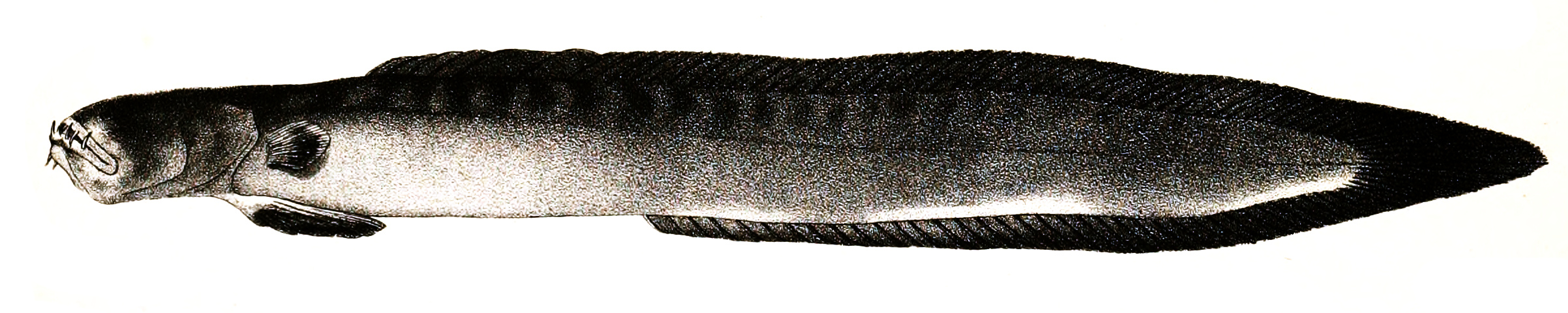

Conservation status
- Data Deficient (IUCN 3.1)

Scientific classification
- Kingdom: Animalia
- Phylum: Chordata
- Class: Actinopterygii
- Order: Gobiiformes
- Family: Oxudercidae
- Genus: Taenioides
- Species: T. buchanani

Binomial name
- Taenioides buchanani (Day, 1873)

Synonyms
- Amblyopus buchanani Day, 1873; Gobioides buchanani (Day, 1873)

= Taenioides buchanani =

Species of fish

Taenioides buchanani, the Burmese gobyeel, is a species of goby in the family Oxudercidae. It is found in the Indian Ocean along the eastern coast of India, Bangladesh and Myanmar.

== Description ==
Taenioides buchanani can reach a total length of 30.0 centimetres (11.8 in).

== Etymology ==
The species epithet is named in honour of Francis Hamilton-Buchanan (1762-1829), a Scottish physician and naturalist, who published an account of Indo-Gangetic fishes in 1822.
