= Gymnoamblyopus =

Scientific classification
- Kingdom: Animalia
- Phylum: Chordata
- Class: Actinopterygii
- Division: Teleostei
- Order: Gobiiformes
- Family: Oxudercidae
- Subfamily: Amblyopinae
- Genus: Gymnoamblyopus
- Species: G. novaeguineae

Binomial name
- Gymnoamblyopus novaeguineae Murdy & Ferraris, 2003

Species of fish

Gymnoamblyopus novaeguineae is a species of freshwater goby endemic to Papua New Guinea. This species grows to a length of 9.9 centimetres (3.9 in) SL. This species is the only known member of its genus.
