= Armour eelgoby =

Conservation status
- Least Concern (IUCN 3.1)

Scientific classification
- Kingdom: Animalia
- Phylum: Chordata
- Class: Actinopterygii
- Order: Gobiiformes
- Family: Oxudercidae
- Subfamily: Amblyopinae
- Genus: Amblyotrypauchen; Hora, 1924
- Species: A. arctocephalus

Binomial name
- Amblyotrypauchen arctocephalus (Alcock, 1890)

Synonyms
- Amblyopus arctocephalus Alcock, 1890; Amblyotrypauchen fraseri Hora, 1924

Species of fish

The armour eelgoby (Amblyotrypauchen arctocephalus) is a species of goby found from the Indian Ocean waters around India to the western Pacific Ocean where it occurs at depths of from 37 to 92 metres (121 to 302 ft). This species is currently the only known member of its genus.
