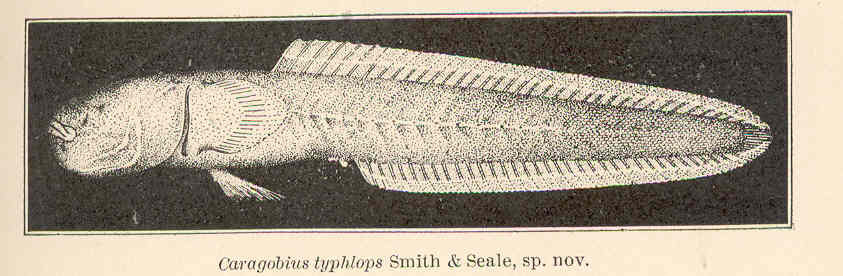
- Caragobius urolepis illustration

Scientific classification
- Kingdom: Animalia
- Phylum: Chordata
- Class: Actinopterygii
- Order: Gobiiformes
- Family: Oxudercidae
- Subfamily: Amblyopinae
- Genus: Caragobius; Smith & Seale, 1906

Type species
- Caragobius typhlops H. M. Smith & Seale, 1906

Synonyms
- Caragobioides H. M. Smith, 1945; Trypauchenophrys Franz, 1910

= Caragobius =

Genus of fishes

Caragobius is a genus of gobies native to Asia and the western Pacific Ocean.

== Species ==
There are currently three recognized species in this genus:

- Caragobius burmanicus (Hora, 1926) (Burmese geel goby)
- Caragobius rubristriatus (Saville-Kent, 1889) (Red eelgoby)
- Caragobius urolepis (Bleeker, 1852) (Scaleless worm goby)
