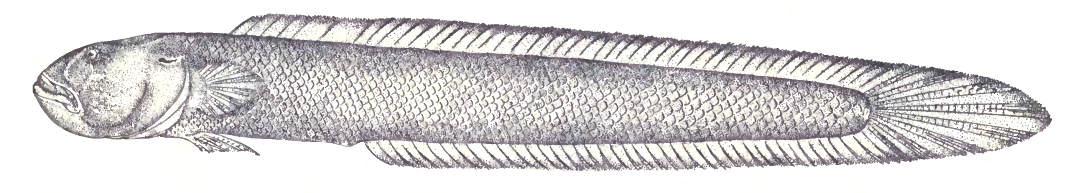
- Illustration of Trypauchen vagina from 1910
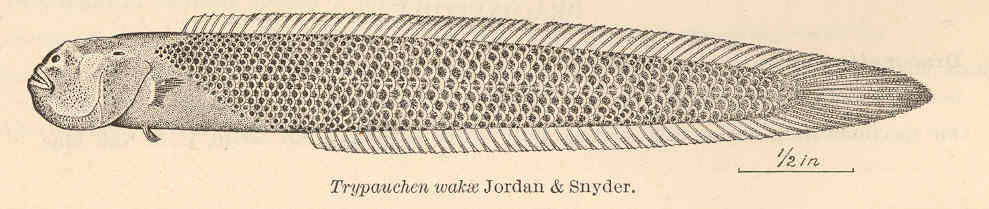
- Illustration of Trypauchen vagina (described here as Trypauchen wakae) from 1901

Scientific classification
- Kingdom: Animalia
- Phylum: Chordata
- Class: Actinopterygii
- Division: Teleostei
- Order: Gobiiformes
- Family: Oxudercidae
- Genus: Trypauchen
- Species: T. vagina

Binomial name
- Trypauchen vagina (Bloch & J. G. Schneider, 1801)

Synonyms
- Gobius vagina Bloch & J. G. Schneider, 1801; Gobioides ruber F. Hamilton, 1822; Trypauchen wakae D. S. Jordan & Snyder, 1901

= Trypauchen vagina =

Burrowing goby

Species of eel goby

Trypauchen vagina, commonly known as the burrowing goby, is a species of eel goby found in the Indo-Pacific region. It has an elongated body about 20 to 22 cm (7.9 to 8.7 in) in length. It is reddish-pink in color and possesses distinctive pouches in the upper edges of its gill covers. It lives in burrows in the silty and muddy bottoms of its marine and brackish habitats. It has reduced eyes that are entirely covered with skin and the anterior portion of its head is protected by thick flesh. Both adaptations aid it in digging its burrows.

== Description ==
T. vagina has an elongated body about 20 to 22 cm (7.9 to 8.7 in) in length. The anal, caudal, and two dorsal fins are fused together with membranous structures, forming a continuous margin around the posterior of the body. The pelvic fins are also completely fused together to form a cup-shaped suction disk. The pectoral fins have fifteen to twenty rays, with the upper rays longer than the lower rays.

The blunt snout, chin, and the area around the eyes are covered by thickened flesh that help it in digging. The mouth slants obliquely. It has two rows of sharp canine-like teeth on both jaws. The teeth on the outer rows are larger than those on the inner rows. The eyes are small and completely covered by skin. No barbels are present on the chin. On the upper edges of the gill covers are distinctive oval holes that open into pouch-like cavities. These pouches are present in only a few of the genera in the subfamily Amblyopinae (the eel gobies). Their function is unknown.

T. vagina is a blotchy reddish pink in coloration. The cheeks, the eye region, and the area behind the gills and above the pectoral fins are bright red. The fins are all colorless and translucent.

== Distribution ==
This species can be found in the shallow marine and brackish waters of the Indian Ocean, the Persian Gulf, and the western Pacific Ocean, from Kuwait to New Caledonia. T. vagina was recently recorded for the first time in the coastal waters of Israel (2009) and Turkey (2010), following its introduction in the Mediterranean Sea via the Suez Canal.

== Ecology ==
As its common name suggests, T. vagina lives in burrows in the silty or muddy bottoms of estuarine and coastal areas. It is omnivorous, mostly preying on small crustaceans that wander near its burrows.

== Taxonomy ==
T. vagina was first described as Gobius vagina by the German ichthyologists Marcus Elieser Bloch and Johann Gottlob Schneider in 1801. It is the type species of the genus Trypauchen, which includes only one other species, Trypauchen pelaeos. The genus was established in 1837 by the French zoologist Achille Valenciennes. The generic name is derived from Ancient Greek τρύπα (trupa, "hole") and αυχενος (aukhenos, "neck"). The specific name is from Latin vagina, meaning "sword sheath", and does not directly have to do with the body part of the same name.

T. vagina is classified under the subfamily Amblyopinae of the goby family Gobiidae.
