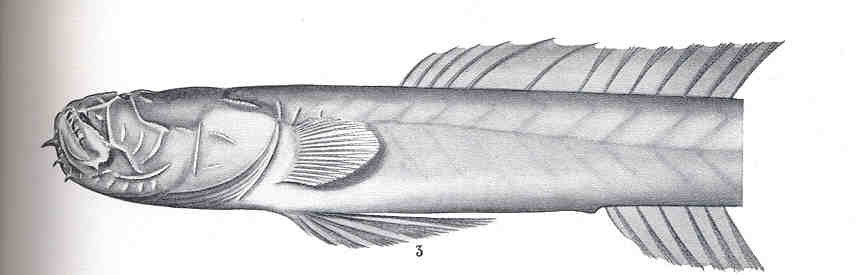

Scientific classification
- Kingdom: Animalia
- Phylum: Chordata
- Class: Actinopterygii
- Order: Gobiiformes
- Family: Oxudercidae
- Genus: Taenioides
- Species: T. purpurascens

Binomial name
- Taenioides purpurascens (De Vis, 1884)

= Taenioides purpurascens =

Species of fish

Taenioides purpurascens, the purple eelgoby, is a species of mud-dwelling bony fish native to Australia.
