= Bearded eelgoby =

Conservation status
- Near Threatened (IUCN 2.3)

Scientific classification
- Kingdom: Animalia
- Phylum: Chordata
- Class: Actinopterygii
- Order: Gobiiformes
- Family: Oxudercidae
- Genus: Taenioides
- Species: T. jacksoni

Binomial name
- Taenioides jacksoni J. L. B. Smith, 1943

Species of fish

The bearded eelgoby (Taenioides jacksoni), also known as the bearded goby, is a species of goby endemic to South Africa where it inhabits muddy areas of mangrove swamps, estuaries and rivers. This species can reach a length of 12 centimetres (4.7 in) TL.
