= Karsten totoyensis =

Scientific classification
- Domain: Eukaryota
- Kingdom: Animalia
- Phylum: Chordata
- Class: Actinopterygii
- Order: Gobiiformes
- Family: Oxudercidae
- Subfamily: Amblyopinae
- Genus: Karsten; Murdy, 2002
- Species: K. totoyensis

Binomial name
- Karsten totoyensis (Garman, 1903)

Synonyms
- Gobioides totoyensis Garman, 1903; Taenioides coecus M. C. W. Weber, 1913; Brachyamblyopus coecus (M. C. W. Weber, 1913)

Species of fish

Karsten totoyensis is a species of goby native to the western Pacific Ocean where it has been recorded from the Philippines, Fiji and Indonesia. This species can be found over muddy or sandy substrates usually down to a depth of 55 metres (180 ft), but it has been recorded down to a depth of 1,122 metres (3,681 ft). This species grows to a length of 4.8 centimetres (1.9 in) SL.

== Etymology ==
This species is the only known member of its genus, whose name honours Karsten E. Hartel, a Curatorial Associate in Ichthyology at the Museum of Comparative Zoology of Harvard University, for his assistance to the describer's studies as well as assisting others over the years.
