= Ctenotrypauchen =

Scientific classification
- Kingdom: Animalia
- Phylum: Chordata
- Class: Actinopterygii
- Order: Gobiiformes
- Family: Oxudercidae
- Subfamily: Amblyopinae
- Genus: Ctenotrypauchen
- Species: C. chinensis

Binomial name
- Ctenotrypauchen chinensis Steindachner, 1867

Species of fish

Ctenotrypauchen chinensis is a species of goby native to fresh waters of China. This species is the only known member of its genus.
