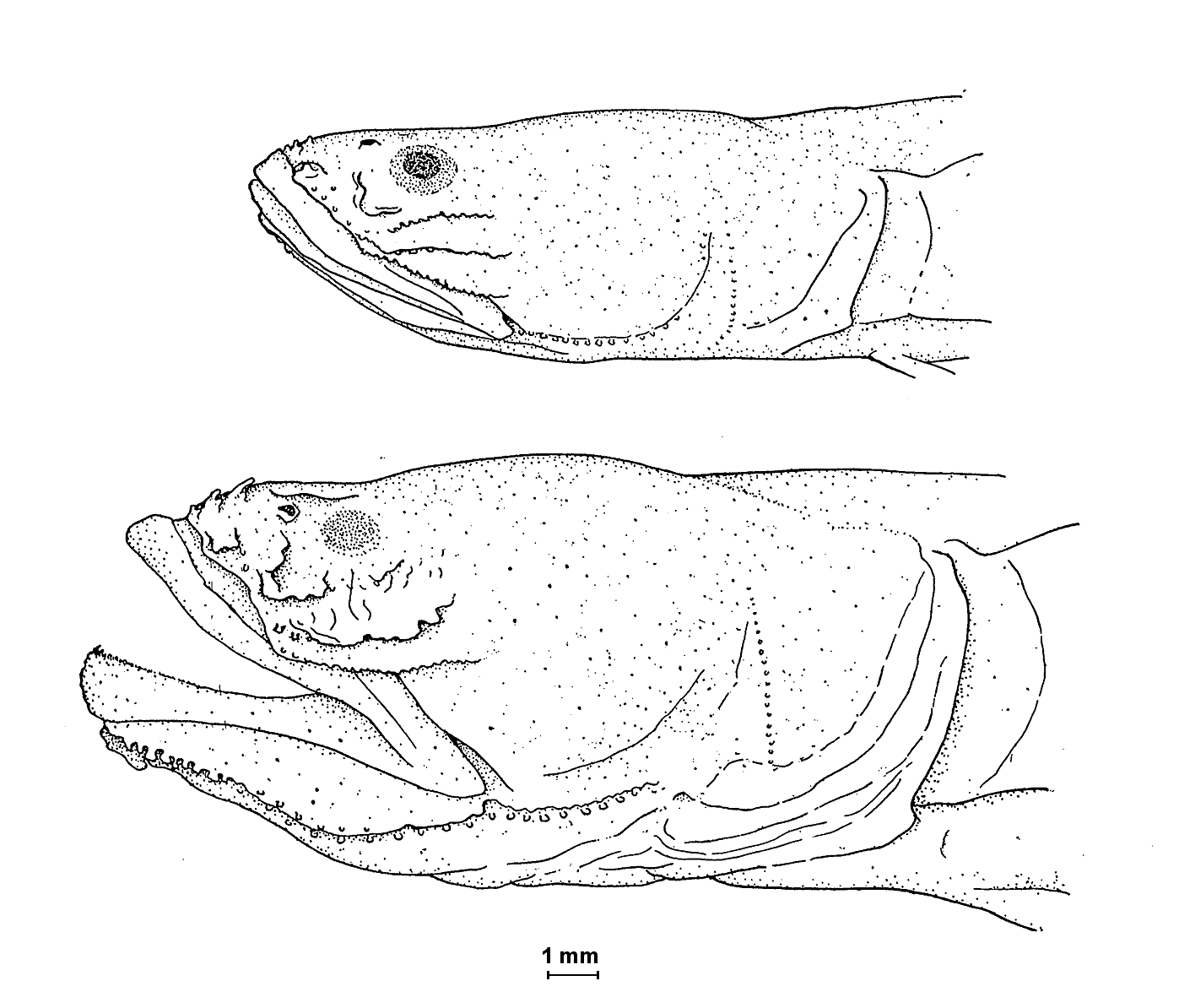

Conservation status
- Vulnerable (IUCN 3.1)

Scientific classification
- Kingdom: Animalia
- Phylum: Chordata
- Class: Actinopterygii
- Division: Teleostei
- Order: Gobiiformes
- Family: Oxudercidae
- Subfamily: Gobionellinae
- Genus: Lethops; C. L. Hubbs, 1926
- Species: L. connectens

Binomial name
- Lethops connectens Hubbs, 1926

= Halfblind goby =

Species of fish

The halfblind goby (Lethops connectens) is a species of marine goby native to the eastern Pacific Ocean from central California, United States to Baja California, Mexico where they inhabit kelp forests. The adults hide amongst the stones and the holdfasts of kelp on the seabed while the juveniles form schools in the kelp canopy. This species can reach a length of 6.4 centimetres (2.5 in) TL. Like the name suggests, the eyes of L. connectens are highly reduced. This species is the only known member of genus Lethops.

== See also ==
- Blind goby
- Blind fish
