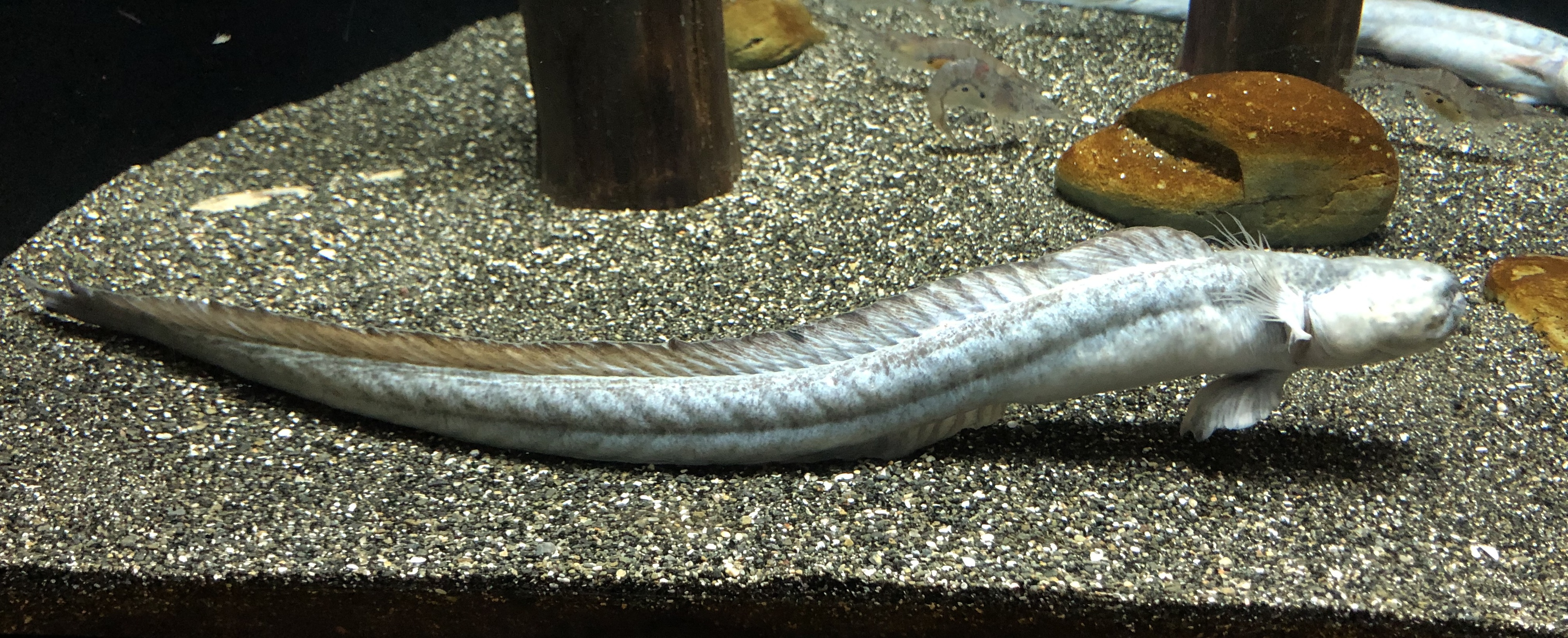

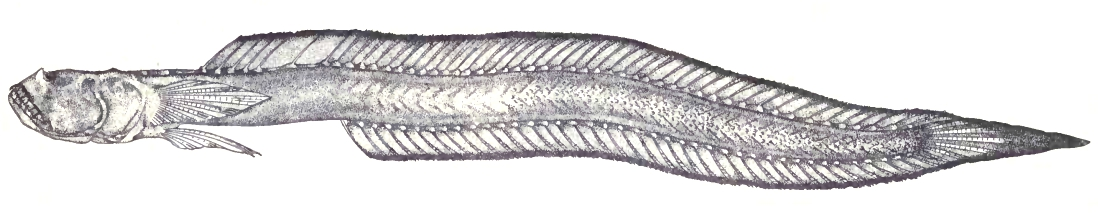

Scientific classification
- Kingdom: Animalia
- Phylum: Chordata
- Class: Actinopterygii
- Order: Gobiiformes
- Family: Oxudercidae
- Genus: Odontamblyopus
- Species: O. lacepedii

Binomial name
- Odontamblyopus lacepedii (Temminck & Schlegel, 1845)

Synonyms
- Amblyopus lacepedii Temminck & Schlegel, 1845; Amblyopus sieboldi Steindachner, 1867; Gobioides petersenii Steindachner, 1893; Taenioides abbotti D. S. Jordan & Starks, 1907; Taenioides petschiliensis Rendahl, 1924; Sericagobioides lighti Herre, 1927; Nudagobioides nankaii T. H. Shaw, 1929; Taenioides limboonkengi H. W. Wu, 1931

= Odontamblyopus lacepedii =

Species of fish

Odontamblyopus lacepedii, also known as daegaengi or warasubo, is a species of eel goby found in muddy-bottomed coastal waters in China, Korea and Japan. This species excavates elaborate vertical burrows up to 90 centimetres (35 in) long in the sea bed. This species can reach a length of 30.3 centimetres (11.9 in) SL. The specific name honours the French naturalist and politician Bernard-Germain-Étienne de La Ville-sur-Illon, comte de Lacépède, publisher of the 5 volume Histoire Naturelle des Poissons who is reported to have illustrated this species under the name Taenioïde Herrmannien. The species is edible.

== As food ==
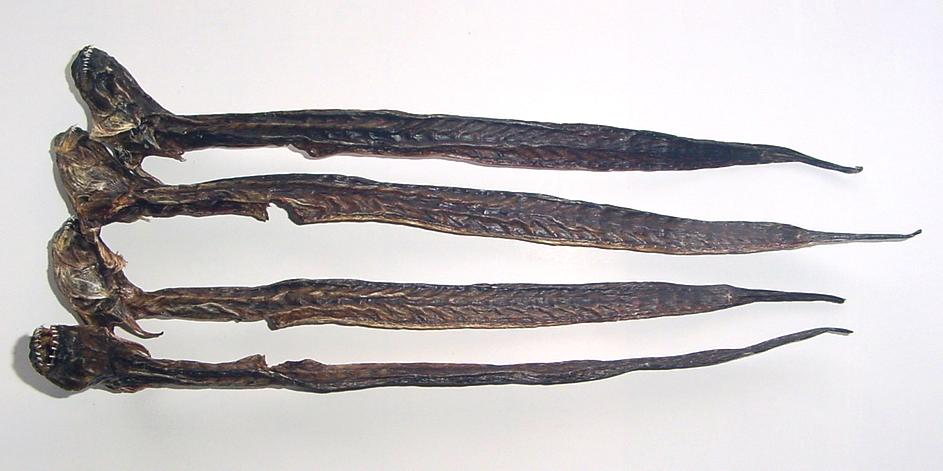
Japanese dried warasubo

Warasubo is a popular dish in cities around the Ariake Sea in Japan, used to boost tourism. Warasubo can be hung by the head and dried, added to miso soup, or eaten as sashimi. They are prepared in the ikizukuri method, or "prepared alive". If hung and dried, it can be placed in sake to give it a fishy flavour. But first, it must be tenderized to release the flavor. This is also required to eat dried warasubo by itself.

In Korea, the fish is called gaesogeng (개소겡), but the regional name daegaengi (대갱이) is used more frequently in context with food. It is a local specialty of Korea's south, e.g. in Suncheon (순천), Beolgyo (벌교) and Haenam (해남), where it is considered a delicacy. The dried fish is consumed as daegaengi po (대갱이포), or seasoned with chili, soy sauce and other spices making daegaengi muchim (대갱이무침).
