= Sovvityazius =

Conservation status
- Data Deficient (IUCN 3.1)

Scientific classification
- Kingdom: Animalia
- Phylum: Chordata
- Class: Actinopterygii
- Order: Gobiiformes
- Family: Oxudercidae
- Subfamily: Amblyopinae
- Genus: Sovvityazius
- Species: S. acer

Binomial name
- Sovvityazius acer Prokofiev, 2015

Genus of fishes

Sovvityazius acer is a species of fish in the family Oxudercidae found in the Philippines. This species is the only member of the genus Sovvityazius.
