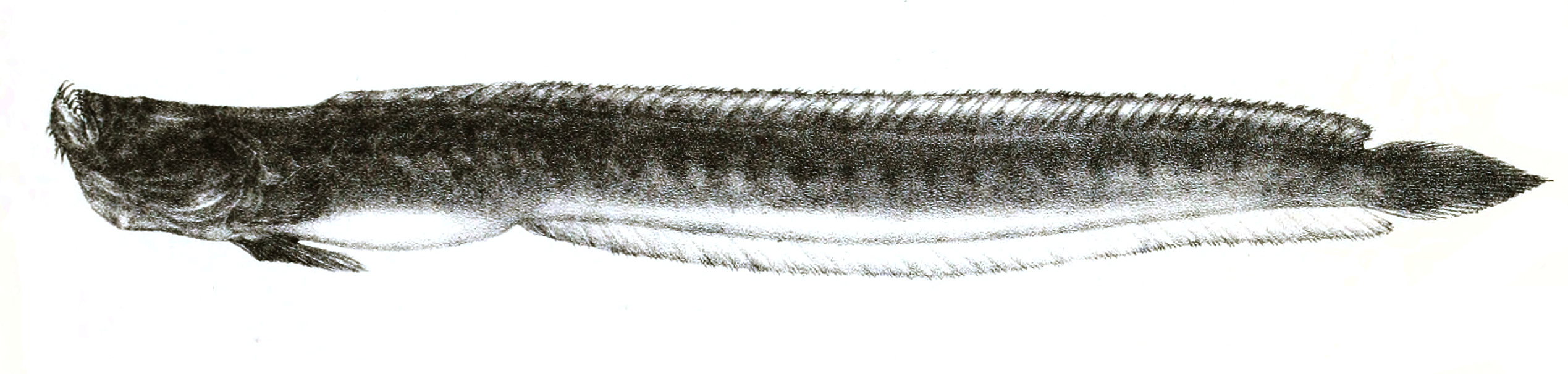

Conservation status
- Least Concern (IUCN 3.1)

Scientific classification
- Kingdom: Animalia
- Phylum: Chordata
- Class: Actinopterygii
- Division: Teleostei
- Order: Gobiiformes
- Family: Oxudercidae
- Genus: Taenioides
- Species: T. cirratus

Binomial name
- Taenioides cirratus (Blyth, 1860)

Synonyms
- Amblyopus cirratus Blyth, 1860; Gobioides cirratus (Blyth, 1860); Amblyopus brachygaster Günther, 1861; Taenioides brachygaster (Günther, 1861); Taenioides snyderi D. S. Jordan & C. L. Hubbs, 1925

= Taenioides cirratus =

Species of fish

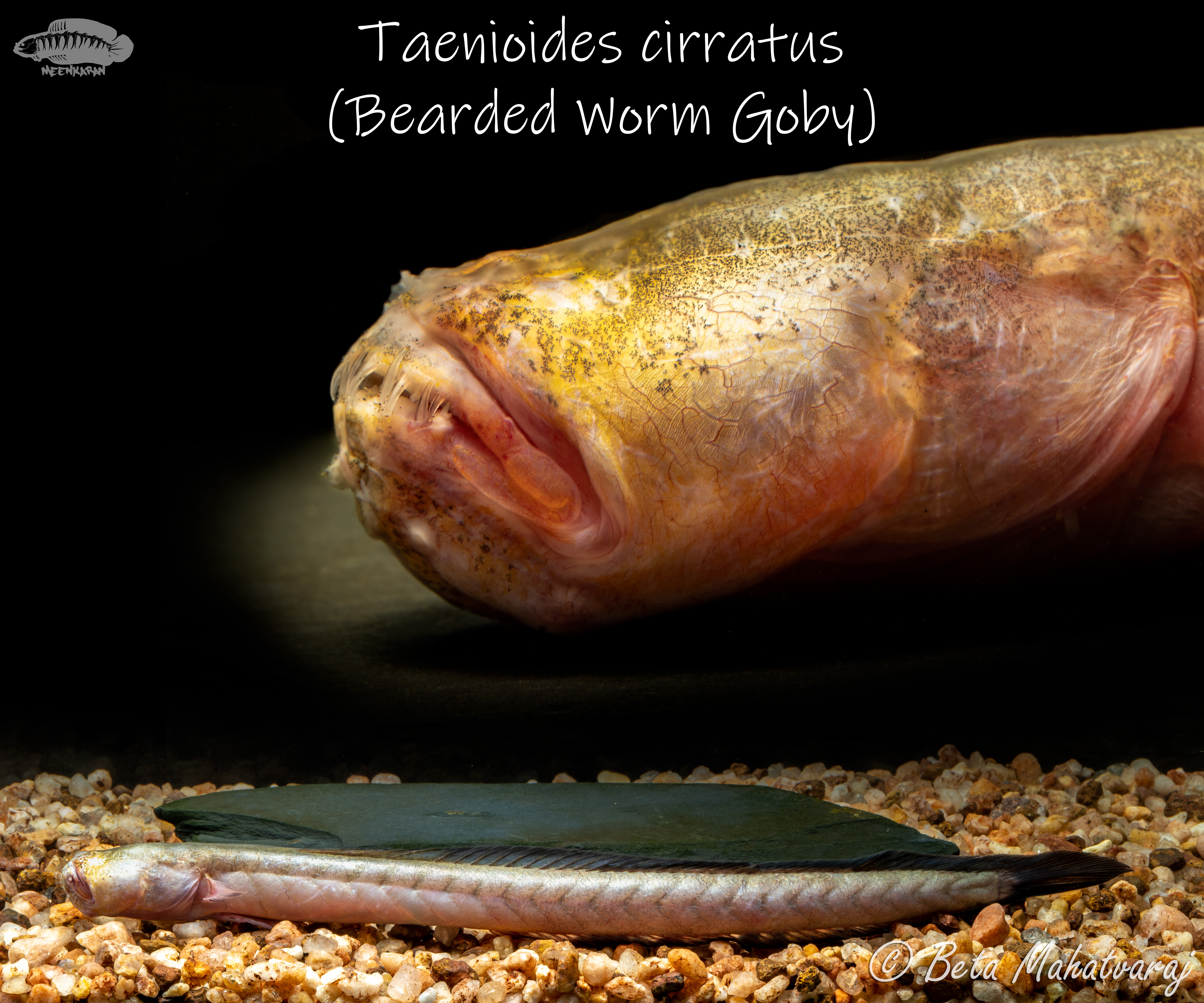
A diagram of a bearded worm goby (Taenioides cirratus) in captivity

Taenioides cirratus, known as the bearded worm goby, is a species of worm goby native to the Indian Ocean and the western Pacific Ocean from islands offshore of eastern Africa to New Caledonia and from Japan to Australia.

== Description ==
This species can reach a total length of 30 cm (12 in) .

== Habitat and distribution ==
The species can be found in estuaries and coastal waters, preferring areas with mud substrates feeding on small crustaceans and other invertebrates. They are found in fresh, brackish, and salt water and the dispersion area is the Mae Klong River (Samut Songkram Province) and Thai Sea Boundary. In Thailand, this species is called plā k̄heụ̄x (ปลาเขือ) and is sometimes eaten. It is capable of surviving in air for a considerable period by sucking air into its bronchial chambers probably to move over land. Taenioides cirratus is an invasive species that has "successfully invaded Gaoyou lake (1980s), Louma lake (2005), and Nansi lake (2011) (Yangyang et al.)." In Chaohu Lake in 2015, they reduced the population of shrimp and benthic fish.
