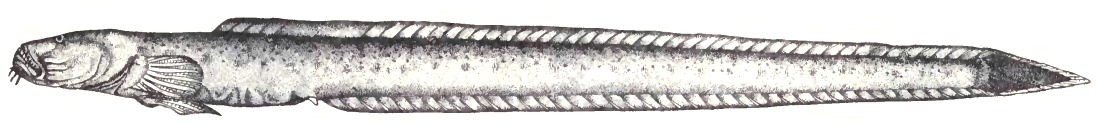
- Slender eel goby (T. gracilis)

Scientific classification
- Domain: Eukaryota
- Kingdom: Animalia
- Phylum: Chordata
- Class: Actinopterygii
- Order: Gobiiformes
- Family: Oxudercidae
- Subfamily: Amblyopinae
- Genus: Taenioides; Lacépède, 1800

Type species
- Taenioides hermannii Lacépède, 1800

Synonyms
- Amblyopus Valenciennes, 1837; Gymnurus Rafinesque, 1815; Leme De Vis, 1883; Psilosomus Swainson, 1839

= Taenioides =

Genus of fishes

Taenioides is a genus of gobies native to fresh, brackish, and marine waters of the coastal areas of the Indian Ocean and the western Pacific Ocean.

== Species ==
Thirteen recognized species are in this genus:

- Taenioides anguillaris (Linnaeus, 1758) (eel worm goby)
- Taenioides buchanani (F. Day, 1873) (Burmese gobyeel)
- Taenioides caniscapulus Roxas & Ablan, 1938
- Taenioides cirratus (Blyth, 1860) (bearded worm goby)
- Taenioides eruptionis (Bleeker, 1849)
- Taenioides esquivel J. L. B. Smith, 1947 (bulldog eelgoby)
- Taenioides gracilis (Valenciennes, 1837) (slender eel goby)
- Taenioides jacksoni J. L. B. Smith, 1943 (bearded eelgoby)
- Taenioides kentalleni Murdy & J. E. Randall, 2002
- Taenioides limicola C. L. Smith, 1964
- Taenioides mordax (De Vis, 1883)
- Taenioides nigrimarginatus Hora, 1924 (blackfin eel goby)
- Taenioides purpurascens (De Vis, 1884) (purple eelgoby)
