= Pseudotrypauchen =

Conservation status
- Data Deficient (IUCN 3.1)

Scientific classification
- Kingdom: Animalia
- Phylum: Chordata
- Class: Actinopterygii
- Division: Teleostei
- Order: Gobiiformes
- Family: Oxudercidae
- Subfamily: Amblyopinae
- Genus: Pseudotrypauchen
- Species: P. multiradiatus

Binomial name
- Pseudotrypauchen multiradiatus Hardenberg, 1931

Synonyms
- Brachyamblyopus multiradiatus (Hardenberg, 1931)

Species of fish

Pseudotrypauchen multiradiatus is a species of goby native to fresh and brackish water environments along the coast of southern Asia from India to Indonesia. This species grows to a length of 9 centimetres (3.5 in) SL. This species is the only known member of its genus.
