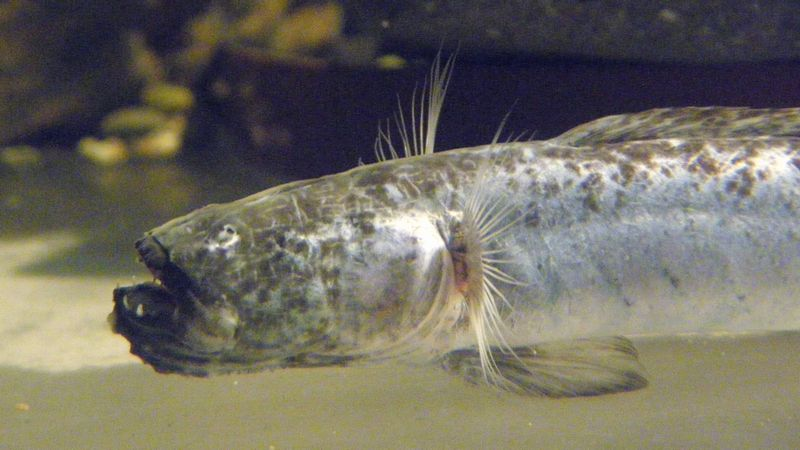
- O. lacepedii

Scientific classification
- Kingdom: Animalia
- Phylum: Chordata
- Class: Actinopterygii
- Order: Gobiiformes
- Family: Oxudercidae
- Subfamily: Amblyopinae
- Genus: Odontamblyopus; Bleeker, 1874

Type species
- Gobioides rubicundus F. Hamilton, 1822

Synonyms
- Nudagobioides T. H. Shaw, 1929; Sericagobioides Herre, 1927

= Odontamblyopus =

Genus of fishes

Odontamblyopus is a genus of gobies native to mud bottomed coastal and estuarine habitats from Pakistan eastward to Japan.

== Species ==
There are currently five recognized species in this genus:

- Odontamblyopus lacepedii (Temminck & Schlegel, 1845)
- Odontamblyopus rebecca (Murdy & Shibukawa, 2003)
- Odontamblyopus roseus (Valenciennes, 1837)
- Odontamblyopus rubicundus (F. Hamilton, 1822)
- Odontamblyopus tenuis (F. Day, 1876)
