= Oxyropsis acutirostris =

Conservation status
- Least Concern (IUCN 3.1)

Scientific classification
- Kingdom: Animalia
- Phylum: Chordata
- Class: Actinopterygii
- Order: Siluriformes
- Family: Loricariidae
- Genus: Oxyropsis
- Species: O. acutirostris

Binomial name
- Oxyropsis acutirostris P. Miranda-Ribeiro, 1951

Synonyms
- Hypoptopoma acutirostre (P. Miranda-Ribeiro, 1951)

Species of fish

Oxyropsis acutirostris is a species of freshwater ray-finned fish belonging to the family Loricariidae, the suckermouth armored catfishes, and the subfamily Hypoptopomatinae, the cascudinhos. This catfish is found in South America, where it is found in the Rio Negro and Orinoco basins.

== Taxonomy ==
Oxyropsis acutirostris was first formally described in 1951 by the Brazilian zoologist Paulo de Miranda-Ribeiro with its type locality given as Paricachoeira on the Rio Taquié, a tributary of the Rio Vaupes, which in turn is a tributary of the Rio Negro in the Brazilian state of Amazonas. This catfish is classified in the genus Oxyropsis which is within the subfamily Hypoptopomatinae and was formerly considered to be a junior synonym of Hypoptopoma, until revalidated as a valid genus in 2002 by Adriana E. Aquino and Scott A. Schaefer.

== Etymology ==
Oxyropsis actutirostris is one of three valid species in the genus Oxyropsis, the name of which combines oxys, meaning "sharp" or "pointed", with opsis, which means "face" or "appearance". The describers of the genus, C. H. Eigenmann and R. S. Eignemann, did not explain this but it is thought to refer to the depressed head of the type species, O. wrightiana. The specific name, acutirostris, means "sharp snout", an allusion to the pointed snout of this species.

== Description ==
Oxyropsis actutirostris is distinguished from the other species in its genus by having a shorter series of 18-19 plates along the middle of the flank; a caudal peduncle with a depth of between 1.8% and 2.2% of its standard length; between 10 and 16 teeth on the premaxilla, 10 to 14 teeth on the mandible; the possession of well developed serra on the spine of the pectoral fin with the serrae being as much as around a third in height as the thickness of the spine. This species reaches a standard length of 4.4 cm (1.7 in).

== Distribution and habitat ==
Oxyropsis actutirostris is found in the Orinoco and Rio Negro basins in Brazil, Colombia and Venezuela. Very little is known about the ecology of this catfish.
