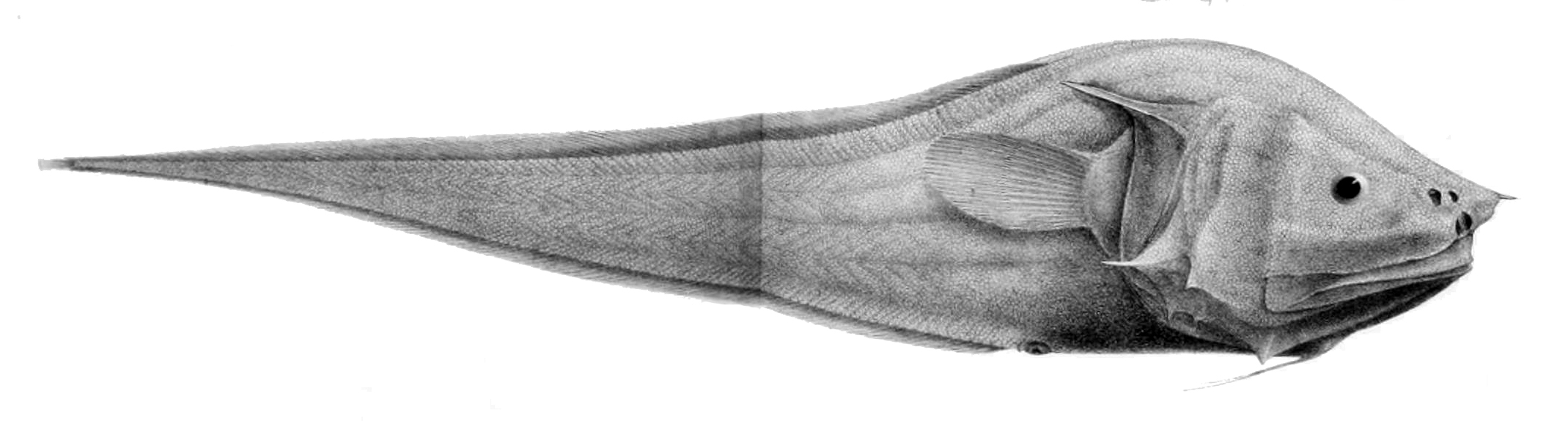
- Bony-eared assfish (Acanthonus armatus)

Scientific classification
- Kingdom: Animalia
- Phylum: Chordata
- Class: Actinopterygii
- Division: Teleostei
- Order: Ophidiiformes
- Suborder: Ophidioidei
- Family: Acanthonidae; Wong & Chen, 2024
- Genus: Acanthonus; Günther, 1878

Species
- See text

Synonyms
- Tauredophidium Alcock, 1890; Xyelacyba Cohen, 1961

= Acanthonus =

Genus of deep-water fishes

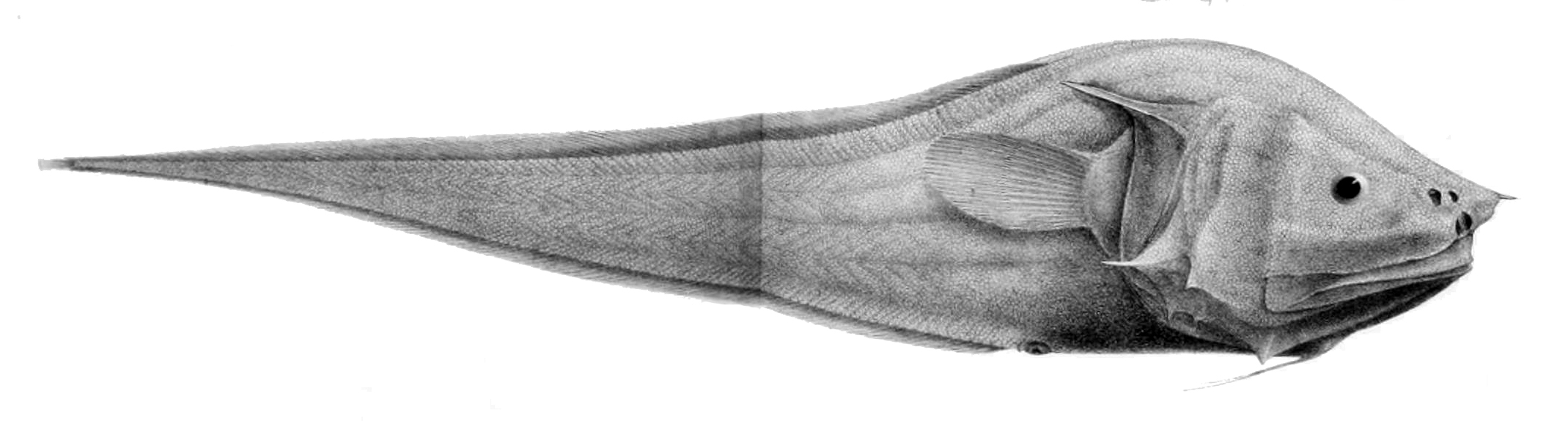
Acanthonus armatus

Acanthonus, also known as deepsea cusk-eels, are a genus of deepwater ophidiiform fish. They are the only members of the family Acanthonidae. They were formerly placed within the subfamily Neobythiinae of the Ophidiidae.

== Species ==
There are three valid species:

- Acanthonus armatus Günther, 1878
- Acanthonus hextii (Alcock, 1890)
- Acanthonus myersi (Cohen, 1961)

Synonyms

Acanthonus spinifer Garman, 1899 accepted as Acanthonus armatus Günther, 1878
