= Trypauchenichthys =

Scientific classification
- Kingdom: Animalia
- Phylum: Chordata
- Class: Actinopterygii
- Order: Gobiiformes
- Family: Oxudercidae
- Subfamily: Amblyopinae
- Genus: Trypauchenichthys; Bleeker, 1860

Type species
- Trypauchenichthys typus Bleeker, 1860

Genus of fishes

Trypauchenichthys is a genus of gobies native to fresh, brackish and marine waters along the Indian Ocean and Pacific coasts of Asia.

== Species ==
There are currently three recognized species in this genus:

- Trypauchenichthys larsonae Murdy, 2008
- Trypauchenichthys sumatrensis Hardenberg, 1931
- Trypauchenichthys typus Bleeker, 1860
