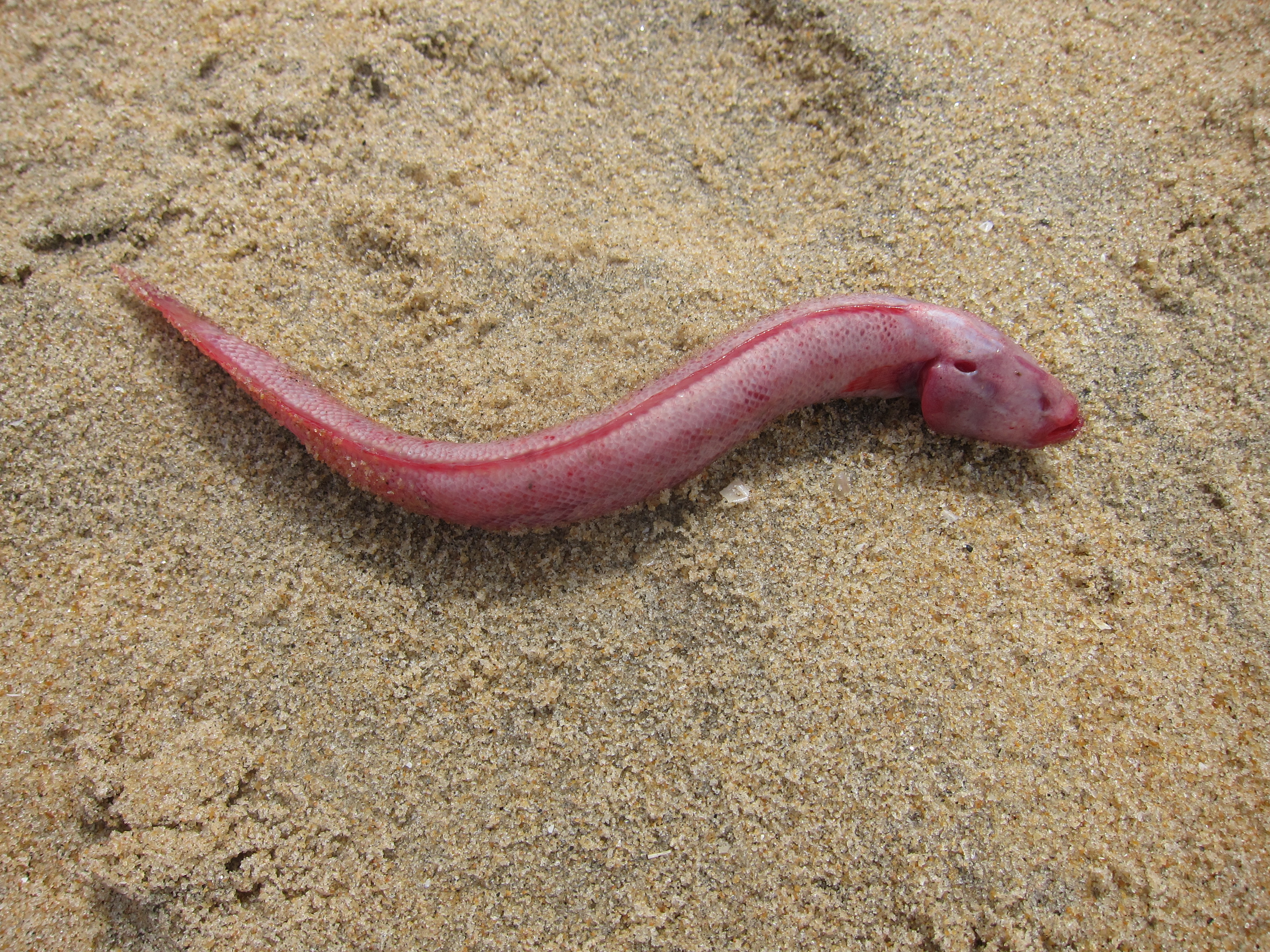
- Trypauchen spp.

Scientific classification
- Kingdom: Animalia
- Phylum: Chordata
- Class: Actinopterygii
- Order: Gobiiformes
- Family: Oxudercidae
- Subfamily: Amblyopinae
- Genus: Trypauchen; Valenciennes, 1837

Type species
- Gobius vagina Bloch & J. G. Schneider, 1801

Species
- See text

= Trypauchen =

Genus of fishes

Trypauchen is a genus of burrowing gobies native to the Indo-Pacific region. It is classified under the subfamily Amblyopinae of the family Gobiidae. The name is derived from Ancient Greek τρύπα (trupa, "hole") and αυχενος (aukhenos, "neck"), referring to the distinctive opercular pouches of the members of the genus.

== Species ==
There are currently two recognized species in this genus:

- Trypauchen pelaeos Murdy, 2006
- Trypauchen vagina (Bloch & J. G. Schneider, 1801)
