= Oxyropsis wrightiana =

Conservation status
- Least Concern (IUCN 3.1)

Scientific classification
- Kingdom: Animalia
- Phylum: Chordata
- Class: Actinopterygii
- Division: Teleostei
- Order: Siluriformes
- Family: Loricariidae
- Genus: Oxyropsis
- Species: O. wrightiana

Binomial name
- Oxyropsis wrightiana C. H. Eigenmann & R. S. Eigenmann, 1889

Synonyms
- Hypoptopoma wrightianum (C. H. Eigenmann & R. S. Eigenmann, 1889)

Species of fish

Oxyropsis wrightiana is a species of freshwater ray-finned fish belonging to the family Loricariidae, the suckermouth armored catfishes, and the subfamily Hypoptopomatinae, the cascudinhos. This catfish is found in South America, where it is found in the Amazon basin.

== Taxonomy ==
Oxyropsis wrightiana was first formally described in 1889 by the American ichthyologists Carl H. Eigenmann and Rosa Smith Eigenmann with its type locality given as Lake Hyanuary in the Brazilian state of Amazonas. When the Eigenmanns described this species they designated it as the type species of the new genus Oxyropsis. This genus was formerly considered to be a junior synonym of Hypoptopoma, until restored as a valid genus in 2002 by Adriana E. Aquino and Scott A. Schaefer.

== Etymology ==
Oxyropsis wrightiana is the type species of the genus Oxyropsis, the name of which combines oxys, meaning "sharp" or "pointed", with opsis, which means "face" or "appearance". The Eigenmanns did not explain this but it is thought to refer to the depressed head of this species. The specific name honors the Scottish-Canadian zoologist Robert Ramsay Wright, although the Eigenmanns misspelt his middle name as Ramsey, in recognition of Wright's contribution to the study of catfish anatomy.

== Description ==
Oxyropsis wrightiana, and O. carinata, are distinguished from O. acutirostris, by have a complete series of 25 or 26 plates along the middle of the flank, a deeper caudal peduncle; having more than 15 teeth on the premaxilla and the mandible; the possession of well developed serra on the spine of the pectoral fin with the serrae being less than a third in height as the thickness of the spine. It is distinguished from O. carinata by having shorter serra on the pectoral fin spine and the serrae are not spread along the whole length of the spine, being restricted to the middle third of the spine. There are between 15 and 24 teeth on the mandible. The last four plates on the flank have 1 or 2 rows of odontodes above and below the midlateral row of enlarged odontodes. This species reaches a standard length of 5.6 cm (2.2 in).

== Distribution and habitat ==
Oxyropsis wrightiana is found in the upper and middle Amazon basin in Brazil, Colombia, Ecuador and Peru. It is a demersal species found in medium sized rivers.
