= Biendongella =

Scientific classification
- Kingdom: Animalia
- Phylum: Chordata
- Class: Actinopterygii
- Order: Gobiiformes
- Suborder: Gobioidei
- Family: Oxudercidae
- Subfamily: Amblyopinae
- Genus: Biendongella; Prokofiev, 2015

Type species
- Biendongella iljini Prokofiev, 2015

Genus of fishes

Biendongella is a genus of fish in the subfamily Gobionellinae native to the South China Sea. The generic name is formed by adding the diminutive suffix ella to the Vietnamese name for the South China Sea, Bien Dong.

== Species ==
There are currently 2 recognized species in this genus:

- Biendongella hemilissa Prokofiev, 2015
- Biendongella iljini Prokofiev, 2015
