= Brachyamblyopus =

Scientific classification
- Kingdom: Animalia
- Phylum: Chordata
- Class: Actinopterygii
- Order: Gobiiformes
- Family: Oxudercidae
- Subfamily: Amblyopinae
- Genus: Brachyamblyopus
- Species: B. brachysoma

Binomial name
- Brachyamblyopus brachysoma (Bleeker, 1854)

Synonyms
- Amblyopus brachysoma Bleeker, 1854

Species of fish

Brachyamblyopus brachysoma is a species of goby native to fresh and brackish waters of southern and southeastern Asia and possibly occurring in Africa and the Persian Gulf. This species grows to a length of 10.5 centimetres (4.1 in) TL. This species is the only known member of its genus.
