= Starostin's loach =

Conservation status
- Vulnerable (IUCN 3.1)

Scientific classification
- Kingdom: Animalia
- Phylum: Chordata
- Class: Actinopterygii
- Order: Cypriniformes
- Family: Nemacheilidae
- Genus: Troglocobitis; Parin, 1983
- Species: T. starostini

Binomial name
- Troglocobitis starostini (Parin, 1983)

Synonyms
- Nemacheilus starostini Parin, 1983

Species of fish

The Starostin's loach (Troglocobitis starostini) is a species of troglobitic stone loach endemic to Turkmenistan. It is the only known member of the genus Troglocobitis, but it has previously been included in the genus Nemacheilus. It is the only cavefish known from Central Asia. The species English vernacular name and specific name honour the hydrobiologist I. V. Starostin, who was a researcher of the inland waters of Turkmenistan.
