= Gargoyle cusk =

Conservation status
- Least Concern (IUCN 3.1)

Scientific classification
- Kingdom: Animalia
- Phylum: Chordata
- Class: Actinopterygii
- Order: Ophidiiformes
- Family: Acanthonidae
- Genus: Acanthonus
- Species: A. myersi

Binomial name
- Acanthonus myersi Cohen, 1961

Synonyms
- Xyelacyba myersi

Species of fish

The gargoyle cusk (Acanthonus myersi) is a species of cusk-eel from the subfamily Neobythitinae of the family Ophidiidae. This species grows to a length of 57 centimetres (22 in) TL. It is sometimes classified in the monotypic genus Xyelacyba, although research suggests the species should be classified in the genus Acanthonus.

== Etymology ==
The specific name honours George S. Myers (1905-1985) of Stanford University who taught the describer, Daniel Cohen, ichthyology. It is a rare benthopelagic fish which occurs at depths of 984–2,500 metres (3,230–8,200 ft) around the world, other than the eastern Pacific, in tropical and subtropical latitudes. The larvae are similar in overall form to the related bony-eared assfish, but have the 1–4 and 15–20 pectoral-fin rays elongated.
