= Dolichallabes microphthalmus =

Conservation status
- Least Concern (IUCN 3.1)

Scientific classification
- Kingdom: Animalia
- Phylum: Chordata
- Class: Actinopterygii
- Order: Siluriformes
- Family: Clariidae
- Genus: Dolichallabes; Poll, 1942
- Species: D. microphthalmus

Binomial name
- Dolichallabes microphthalmus Poll, 1942

Species of fish

Dolichallabes microphthalmus is the only species of airbreathing catfish (order Siluriformes) in the genus Dolichallabes.

== Distribution ==
D. microphthalmus is known from the Congo River system. It was originally described from Kunungu, close to the central Congo River. This species is found in the same region around Bolobo and in the swamp areas near to Boende, Bokuma (Tshuapa) and Ingonge, in the Ruki River Basin. This species has also been collected around Maylimbe, Tshela region, on the Lower Congo Basin.

== Description ==
D. microphthalmus is the most elongate, eel-like species of clariid catfish. It also has a reduced skull, and its unpaired fins (dorsal, caudal, and anal fins) are continuous. The pectoral fins, though always present, may be extremely reduced in some specimens. The eyes are small. The lower lip is equal to or overgrows the upper lip. Due to certain skeletal characteristics, it has been suggested that D. microphthalmus is a paedomorphic clariid. This species grows up to about 25 centimetres (9.8 in) TL.
