= Comb goby =

Conservation status
- Least Concern (IUCN 3.1)

Scientific classification
- Kingdom: Animalia
- Phylum: Chordata
- Class: Actinopterygii
- Order: Gobiiformes
- Family: Oxudercidae
- Subfamily: Amblyopinae
- Genus: Paratrypauchen; Murdy, 2008
- Species: P. microcephalus

Binomial name
- Paratrypauchen microcephalus (Bleeker, 1860)

Synonyms
- Trypauchen microcephalus Bleeker, 1860; Ctenotrypauchen microcephalus (Bleeker, 1860); Taeniodes microcephalus (Bleeker, 1860); Trypauchen raha Popta, 1922; Ctenotrypauchen barnardi Hora, 1926

Species of fish

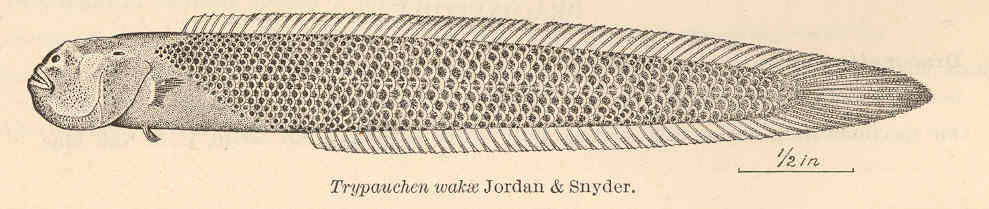
An image of Trypauchen wakae (Paratrypauchen microcephalus) by Jordan and Snyder

The comb goby (Paratrypauchen microcephalus) is a species of goby native to marine and brackish waters of the Indian Ocean and the western Pacific Ocean. This species occurs mostly on muddy substrates near mangrove forests. This species grows to a length of 18 centimetres (7.1 in) TL. This species is of minor importance to local commercial fisheries and can also be found in the aquarium trade. This species is the only known member of its genus. Paratrypauchen microcephalus has been recorded from areas which have soft, muddy bottoms, in estuaries and around the mouths of rivers near mangroves where they inhabit deep burrows in the mud. It is not known if they excavate the burrows themselves. This species feeds on benthic invertebrates such as crustaceans.
