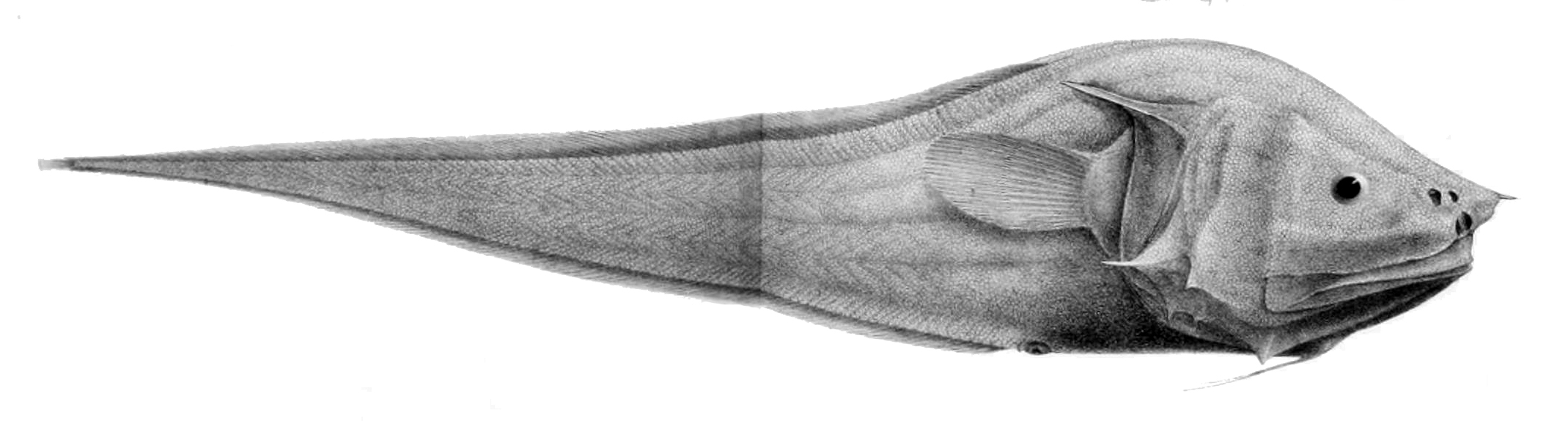
- Specimen from north of New Guinea
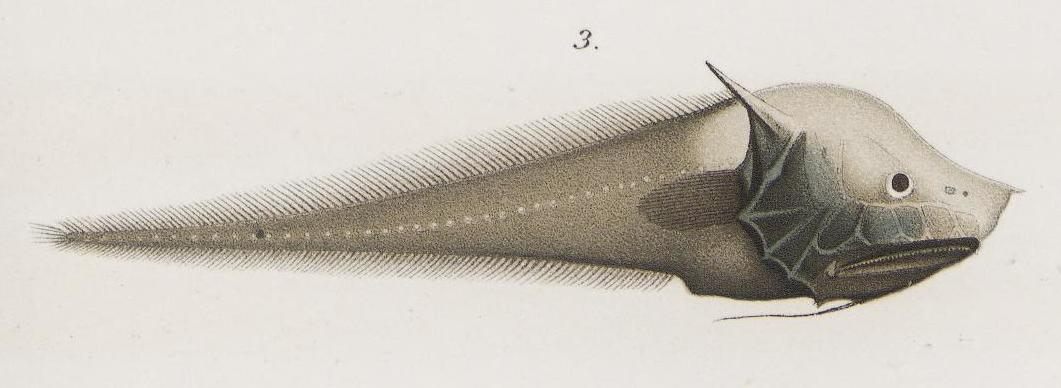
- Specimen from south of Panama

Conservation status
- Least Concern (IUCN 3.1)

Scientific classification
- Kingdom: Animalia
- Phylum: Chordata
- Class: Actinopterygii
- Division: Teleostei
- Order: Ophidiiformes
- Family: Acanthonidae
- Genus: Acanthonus
- Species: A. armatus

Binomial name
- Acanthonus armatus Günther, 1878

Synonyms
- Acanthonus spinifer Garman, 1899

= Bony-eared assfish =

Bony-eared assfish Temporal range: Holocene

Species of fish

The bony-eared assfish (Acanthonus armatus) is a bathypelagic species of cusk-eel found in tropical and sub-tropical oceans at depths of from 1,171 to 4,415 metres (3,842 to 14,485 ft). It has been found as far north as Queen Charlotte Sound off British Columbia's coast. This species grows to a length of 37.5 centimetres (14.8 in) standard length. The larvae are similar in overall form to the related gargoyle cusk, but have elongated 3rd, 4th, and 5th pectoral-fin rays.

The bony-eared assfish has been distinguished, by some sources, as having the smallest brain-to-body weight ratio of any living vertebrate, with one sample brain weighing just 6 milligrams. But the ratio is closely contested by some species of lamprey and the ocean sunfish.

Like many other creatures that dwell in the depths of the sea, assfish are soft and flabby with a light skeleton. This is likely to have resulted from a lack of food and the high pressures which accompany living at such a depth, making it difficult to generate muscle and bone.

== Discovery and naming ==
The type specimen was an 11.5-inch (29 cm) individual taken by the Challenger expedition (1872–1876) north of New Guinea at a depth of 1,075 fathoms (6,450 ft; 1,966 m). It was described in 1878 by German ichthyologist Albert Günther, who gave the species its scientific name. Armatus means "armed" in Latin, likely chosen because the fish sports spines off the tip of the nose and the gills. This also perhaps accounts for the "bony-eared" part, according to Gavin Hanke, curator of vertebrate zoology at the Royal British Columbia Museum. Akanthos is Ancient Greek for "prickly", and onus could either mean "hake, a relative of cod", Hanke says, "or a donkey". Adam Summers, associate director at the Friday Harbor Laboratories at the University of Washington, concurs, saying onus could easily read "as a homonym of the Greek word for ass" (referring to a donkey).
