= Rosa Smith Eigenmann =

American ichthyologist

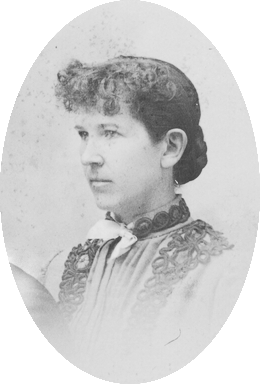
- Born: Rosa Smith; October 7, 1858; Monmouth, Illinois
- Died: January 12, 1947 (aged 88); San Diego, California
- Resting place: Greenwood Memorial Park
- Spouse: Carl H. Eigenmann
- Scientific career
- Fields: Ichthyology
- Workplaces: California Academy of Sciences
- Academic advisors: David Starr Jordan

Rosa Smith Eigenmann (October 7, 1858 – January 12, 1947) was an American ichthyologist (the branch of zoology devoted to the study of fish), as well as a writer, editor, former curator at the California Academy of Sciences, and the first librarian of the San Diego Society of Natural History. She "is considered the first woman ichthyologist in the United States." Eigenmann was also the first woman to become president of Indiana University's chapter of Sigma Xi, an honorary science society. She authored twelve published papers of her own between 1880 and 1893, and collaborated with her husband, Carl H. Eigenmann, as "Eigenmann & Eigenmann" on twenty-five additional works between 1888 and 1893. Together, they are credited with describing about 150 species of fishes.

== Early life and education ==
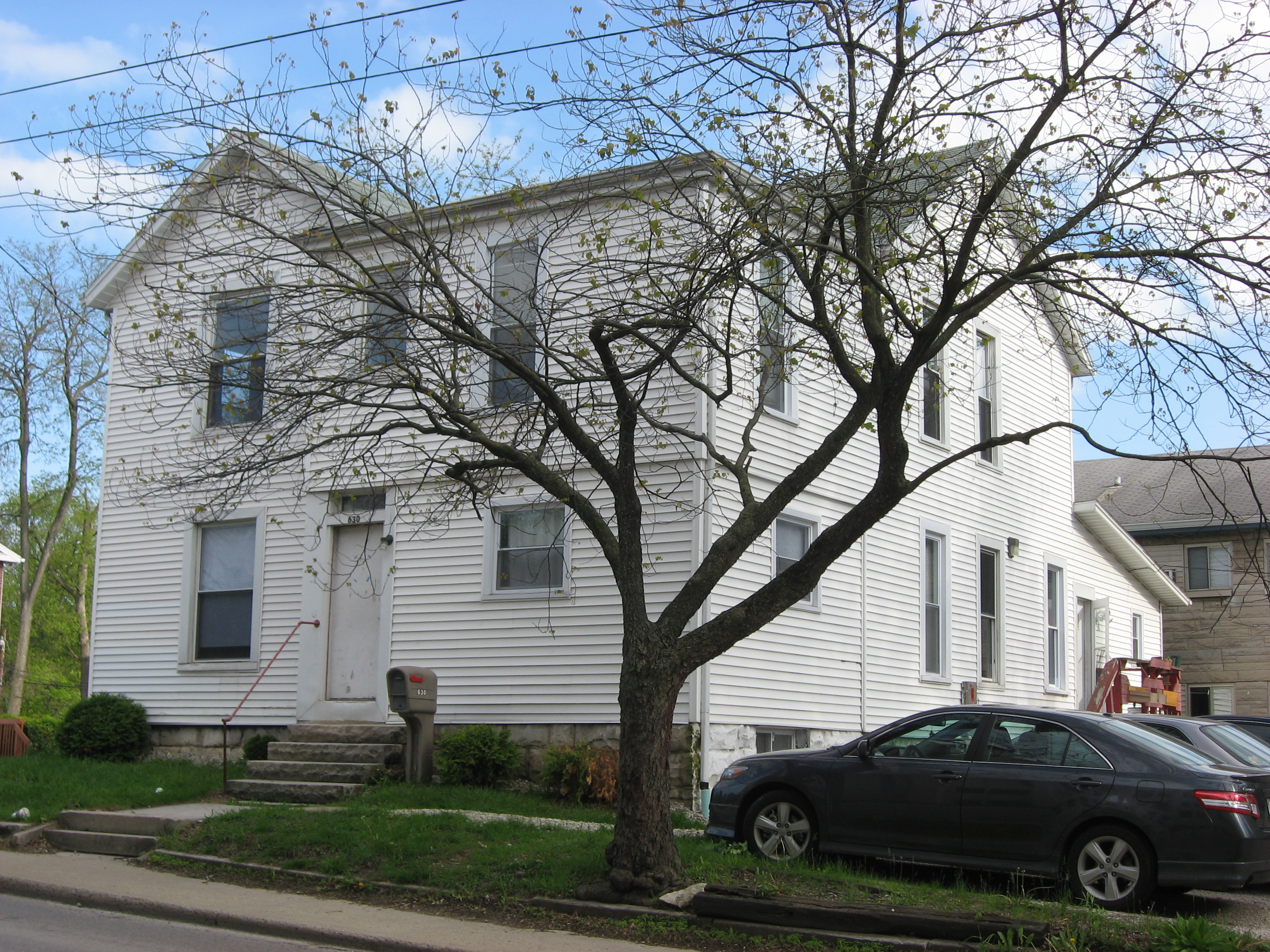
Eigenmann's former home in Bloomington, Indiana

Rosa Smith was born on October 7, 1858, in Monmouth, Illinois, the youngest of Lucretia (Gray) and Charles Kendall Smith's nine children. Smith's parents, originally from Vermont, had moved to Illinois to begin publishing a newspaper. Charles Kendall Smith founded the Monmouth Atlas in 1846, but sold it in 1857. Seeking a warmer climate for family health reasons, the Smiths moved to California in 1876 and settled in San Diego.

Smith completed her secondary education at the Point Loma Seminary in San Diego. Smith also attended a five-week course at a business college in San Francisco, where she was one of only two women in the class. (The other was Kate Sessions, later an important San Diego horticulturalist known as the "Mother of Balboa Park.")

Smith had a lifelong interest in natural history. She began by observing and collecting bird and animal specimens in California and joined the San Diego Society of Natural History (San Diego Natural History Museum) in 1878 as an associate member. Smith became the first woman with full membership in the Society in 1879, and also served as the Society's librarian and recording secretary for several years during the 1880s.

Smith met David Starr Jordan, a noted ichthyologist from Indiana University in Bloomington, Indiana, while he was visiting San Diego in 1879. The circumstances of their meeting are uncertain, but Jordan may have heard Smith read her paper at a meeting of the San Diego Society of Natural History about a new species of fish. At about this time, she had discovered the blind goby Othonops eos living in caves underneath the Point Loma peninsula. Jordan was impressed and encouraged her to continue her studies as one of his zoology students at IU. Smith accepted Jordan's offer, and spent the summer of 1880 touring Europe with Jordan and some of his colleagues and students. After returning to the United States, she spent two years studying at IU before an illness in the family caused her to return to San Diego in 1882 without earning an undergraduate degree.

== Marriage and family ==
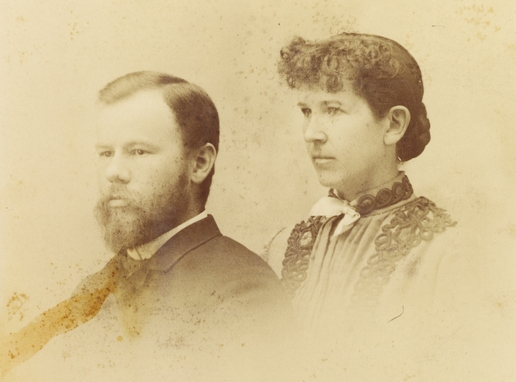
Photograph of Carl H. Eigenmann and Rosa Smith Eigenmann, 1889.

Smith met fellow IU student Carl H. Eigenmann, a German scientist who was pursuing a doctorate degree in ichthyology, through her studies with professor Jordan. Eigenmann corresponded with Smith while she was living in San Diego and also traveled to California, where the couple were married at Smith's home on August 20, 1887.

The Eigenmanns had five children. Lucretia Margaretha Eigenmann (1889–1965), the eldest, was mentally disabled; their only son, Theodore Smith Eigenmann (1893–1970), later became institutionalized after serving in the army in 1918. Although family responsibilities prevented her from pursuing her own research, she continued to work as an editor on her husband's papers. The three other Eigenmann's children pursued professional careers. Charlotte Elizabeth Eigenmann (1891-1959) graduated from Stanford University and pursued an editorial career. Adele Rosa (Eigenmann) Eiler (1896-1978) accompanied her father on the Irwin Expedition to South America in 1918-1919, and received a medical degree from Indiana University in 1921. Adele and her husband, John Oliver Eiler, later moved to San Diego. Thora Marie Eigenmann (1901-1968), a graduate of the University of Missouri, became a writer.

Rosa Eigenmann bore most of the family responsibilities for raising their children, although she continued to collaborate on scientific research with her husband. Family responsibilities also prevented her from pursuing her own research after 1893, but she continued to work with her husband as an editor of his research papers.

== Career ==
Around 1879 Smith discovered blind goby (Othonops eos) living in underwater caves at San Diego's Point Loma peninsula. The discovery led to her additional training in the natural sciences at Indiana University and launched her work as an ichthyologist. Smith published her first articles in 1880, which included "On the occurrence of a species of Cremnobates at San Diego, California," in the Proceedings of the U.S. National Museum, and A list of fish of San Diego California (1880), which was submitted to the San Diego Society of Natural History. The American Museum of Natural History also published several of Smith's articles.

After returning to San Diego from Bloomington, Indiana, in 1882, she focused on publishing formal descriptions of the blind goby and other species of fishes. By the age of twenty-eight, several of her papers had been published in the Proceedings of the U.S. National Museum. In addition, the Smithsonian Institution had asked her to make a collection of surf perch from the San Diego area. With her family's involvement in newspaper publishing in California, it is not surprising that she also worked as a journalist, becoming a reporter for the San Diego Union, possibly its first woman reporter, while continuing to write and edit scholarly papers.

Following Smith's marriage to Carl Eigenmann in 1887, the couple immediately left for Harvard University, where they studied the Agassiz collections of South American fishes and collaborated on research. The Eigenmanns also spent the summer of 1888 at Woods Hole, Massachusetts, the site of a U.S. Fish Commission station. Their first collaboration, a study of South American freshwater fishes that were in the collections at Harvard, was published in 1888 as "A list of the American species of Gobiidae and Callionymidae, with notes on the specimens contained in the Museum of Comparative Zoology, at Cambridge, Massachusetts," as well as "Preliminary notes on South American Nematognathi" which appeared in the Proceedings of the California Academy of Sciences, and "South American Nematognathi" in the American Naturalist. In addition to collaborating on research with her husband, she was granted special student status at Harvard to study cryptogamic botany with William G. Farlow in 1887–88.

After their return to California in 1889, the Eigenmanns established a biological station in San Diego and continued their studies of fish in the region. The Eigenmanns also held appointments as curators at the California Academy of Sciences. In 1891, after David Starr Jordan left his position at Indiana University to become chancellor of Stanford University, Eigenmann's husband, Carl, replaced Jordan as professor of zoology at IU and the Eigenmanns returned to Bloomington, Indiana. Carl Eigenmann was later named chair of the zoology department, and in 1908 he became the first Dean of the Graduate School.

Rosa Eigenmann authored twelve published papers on her own between 1880 and 1893 and co-authored another twenty-five more with her husband, Carl, including notable works on fresh-water fishes in South America and on various species of fishes in western North America. Due to their research and publication, "the Eigenmann and Eigenmann authority" became well known throughout the ichthyological community.

Eigenmann was proud of women's academic accomplishments, but she felt that women in science had not received proper recognition because there were so few women working in the sciences. As she told the Pacific Coast Women's Press Association in 1891: "In science as everywhere else in the domain of thought, woman should be judged by the same standard as her brother. Her work must not simply be well done for a woman."

== Later years ==
Eigenmann's last co-authored publication with her husband, Carl, was "Preliminary descriptions of new fishes from the Northwest," which appeared in the American Naturalist (1893). After her retirement from active research in 1893 to care for her family, she continued to edit her husband's papers on research topics that included fishes of the Pacific coast, blind cave vertebrates from Kentucky and southern Indiana, and South America's freshwater fishes. In 1893 she also delivered a lecture at the Smithsonian Museum on the topic of women in science, which was later published. In addition, she served as president of The National Science Club for Women in 1895.

Eigenmann's husband, Carl, never fully recovered from his high altitude expeditions in Chile in 1918, which weakened his health. In 1926 the Eigenmanns left Indiana and returned to San Diego. Carl Eigenmann suffered a stroke in a year later, and died on April 24, 1927. Rosa Eigenmann continued to live in the San Diego area Coronado, California, following her husband's death, but she was no longer scientifically active.

== Death and legacy ==
Rosa Smith Eigenmann died on January 12, 1947, in San Diego, California, of chronic myocarditis, which followed a series of difficult eye operations. Her remains are buried in San Diego's Greenwood Memorial Park cemetery.

David Starr Jordan, who was Eigenmann's former professor, credited Eigenmann and her husband, Carl, with identifying 35 new genera, and others have credited the couple with providing the initial descriptions of nearly 150 species of fishes. She was also the first woman to become president of the Indiana University's chapter of Sigma Xi, an honorary science society.

== Published works ==
Authored:

- A list of the fishes of San Diego, California (San Diego, California: privately published, 1880) (List was submitted to the San Diego Society of Natural History, November 5, 1880.)
- "On the occurrence of a species of Cremnobates at San Diego, California," Proceedings of the U.S. National Museum (1880) 3: 147–49
- "Description of a new gobioid fish (Othonops eos) from San Diego, California," Proceedings of the U.S. National Museum (1881) 4: 19–21
- "Description of a new species of Gobiesox (G. rhessodon) from San Diego, California," Proceedings of the U.S. National Museum (1881) 4: 140–41
- "Description of a new species of Uranidea (U. rhothea) from Spokane river, Washington territory," Proceedings of the U.S. National Museum (1883) 6: 347–48
- "The life colors of Cremnobates integripinnis," Proceedings of the U.S. National Museum (1883) 6: 216–17
- "Notes of the fishes of Todos Santos bay, Lower California," Proceedings of the U.S. National Museum (1883) 6: 232–36
- "On the life coloration of the young of Pomacentrus rubicundus," Proceedings of the U.S. National Museum (1883) 6: 652
- "Notes on fishes collected at San Cristobal, Lower California, by Charles H. Townsend, assistant, U.S. Fish commission," Proceedings of the U.S. National Museum (1885) 7: 551–53
- "On the occurrence of a new species of Rhinoptera (R. encenadoe) in Todos Santos bay, Lower California," Proceedings of the U.S. National Museum (1886) 9: 220
- "Description of a New Species of Euprotomicrus," Proceedings of the California Academy of Sciences (1890) 2 (ser. 3): 35
- "New California Fishes, " American Naturalist (1891) 25: 153–56

Co-authored with Carl H. Eigenmann:

- "Cyprinodon californiensis," The West-American Scientist (1888) 5: 3–4
- "A list of the American species of Gobiidae and Callionymidae, with notes on the specimens contained in the Museum of Comparative Zoology, at Cambridge, Massachusetts," Proceedings of the California Academy of Sciences (1888) 2 (ser. 1): 51–78
- "Notes on some Californian fishes, with descriptions of two new species," Proceedings of the U.S. National Museum (1888) 11: 463–66
- "Preliminary notes on South American Nematognathi" Proceedings of the California Academy of Sciences (1888) 2 (ser. 1): 119–72; and 2 (ser. 2), pp. 28–56
- "South American Nematognathi," American Naturalist (1888) 23: 647–49
- "Contributions from the San Diego biological laboratory," The West-American Scientist (1889) 6: 44–47
- "Description of a new species of Cyprinodon," Proceedings of the California Academy of Sciences (1889) 2 (ser. 1): 270
- "Description of new nematogathoid fishes from Brazil," The West-American Scientist (1889) 6: 8–10
- "Notes from the San Diego biological laboratory. The fishes of Cortez banks; additions to the fauna of San Diego; fishes of Aetna springs, Napa county, California; fishes of Allen springs, Lake county, California," The West-American Scientist (1889) 6: 123–32; 147–50
- "On the development of California food fishes," American Naturalist (1889) 23: 107–10
- "On the genesis of the color-cells of fishes," The West-American Scientist (1889) 6: 61–62
- "On the phosphorescent spots of Porichthys margaritatus," The West-American Scientist (1889) 6: 32–34
- "Preliminary descriptions of new species and genera of Characinidae," The West-American Scientist (1889) 6: 7–8
- "A review of the Erythrininae," Proceedings of the California Academy of Sciences (1889) 2 (ser. 2): 100–16
- "A revision of the edentulous genera of Curimatinae," Annuals of the New York Academy of Science (1889) 4: 409–40
- "The young stages of some selachians," American Naturalist (1888) 25: 150–51; and also: The West-American Scientist (1889) 6: 150–51
- "Additions to the fauna of San Diego," Proceedings of the California Academy of Sciences (1890) 2 (ser. 3): 1–24
- "Descriptions of new species of Sebastodes," Proceedings of the California Academy of Sciences (1890) 2 (ser. 3): 36–38
- A revision of the South American Nematognathi, or cat-fishes (San Francisco: California Academy of Sciences, 1890)
- "Cottus beldingi, sp. nov.," American Naturalist (1891) 25: 1132–33
- "Recent additions to the ichthyological fauna of California," Proceedings of the California Academy of Sciences (1891) p. 159–61
- "A catalogue of the fishes of the Pacific coast of America, north of Cerros island," Annuals of the New York Academy of Science (1892) 6: 349–58
- "A catalogue of the fresh-water fishes of South America," Proceedings of the U.S. National Museum (1892) 14: 1–81
- "New fishes from western Canada," American Naturalist (1892) 26: 961–64
- "Preliminary descriptions of new fishes from the Northwest," American Naturalist (1893) 27: 151–54

Co-authored with John Swain:

- "Notes on a collection of fishes from Johnson's island (700 miles S.W. of the Hawaiian group) including descriptions of five new species," Proceedings of the U.S. National Museum, (1882) 5: 119–43
