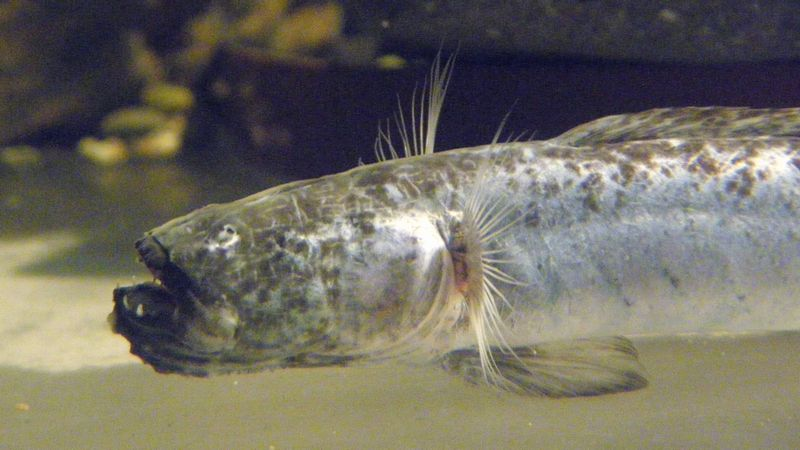
- Odontamblyopus lacepedii

Scientific classification
- Kingdom: Animalia
- Phylum: Chordata
- Class: Actinopterygii
- Division: Teleostei
- Order: Gobiiformes
- Family: Oxudercidae
- Subfamily: Amblyopinae; Günther, 1861

= Amblyopinae =

Subfamily of fishes

Amblyopinae is a subfamily of elongated mud-dwelling gobies commonly called eel gobies or worm gobies; it has been regarded as a subfamily of the family Gobiidae, while the 5th edition Fishes of the World classifies it as a subfamily of the family Oxudercidae. The members in the subfamily have two dorsal fins that are connected by a membranous structure and their eyes are highly reduced in size. They are usually pink, red, or purple in coloration.

== Genera ==
Currently, 15 genera in this subfamily are recognized:

- Amblyotrypauchen Hora, 1924
- Biendongella Prokofiev, 2015
- Brachyamblyopus Bleeker, 1874
- Caragobius H. M. Smith & Seale, 1906
- Ctenotrypauchen Steindachner, 1867
- Gymnoamblyopus Murdy & Ferraris, 2003
- Karsten Murdy, 2002
- Odontamblyopus Bleeker, 1874
- Paratrypauchen Murdy, 2008
- Pseudotrypauchen Hardenberg, 1931
- Sovvityazius Prokofiev, 2015
- Taenioides Lacépède, 1800
- Trypauchen Valenciennes, 1837
- Trypauchenichthys Bleeker, 1860
- Trypauchenopsis Volz, 1903
