= Angled worm lizard =

Conservation status
- Least Concern (IUCN 3.1)

Scientific classification
- Domain: Eukaryota
- Kingdom: Animalia
- Phylum: Chordata
- Class: Reptilia
- Order: Squamata
- Clade: Amphisbaenia
- Family: Trogonophidae
- Genus: Agamodon
- Species: A. anguliceps

Binomial name
- Agamodon anguliceps Peters, 1882

Species of lizard

The angled worm lizard (Agamodon anguliceps) is a species of reptile in the family Trogonophidae. It is found in Somalia in the Horn of Africa. Markings on specimens of Agamodon anguliceps are mottled as yellowish white with darker brown markings along the side of the lizard. The anatomical skull structure of the angled worm lizard features a short, sharp angle between the occipitoparietal and facial plane region.
