= Flat worm lizard =

Conservation status
- Data Deficient (IUCN 3.1)

Scientific classification
- Domain: Eukaryota
- Kingdom: Animalia
- Phylum: Chordata
- Class: Reptilia
- Order: Squamata
- Clade: Amphisbaenia
- Family: Trogonophidae
- Genus: Agamodon
- Species: A. compressus

Binomial name
- Agamodon compressus Mocquard, 1888

Species of lizard

The flat worm lizard (Agamodon compressus) is a species of reptile in the family Trogonophidae. It is found in Somalia.
