= Agamodon =

Scientific classification
- Kingdom: Animalia
- Phylum: Chordata
- Class: Reptilia
- Order: Squamata
- Suborder: Lacertoidea
- Clade: Amphisbaenia
- Family: Trogonophidae
- Genus: Agamodon; Peters, 1882

Type species
- Agamodon anguliceps Peters, 1882

Species
- 3, see text.

Genus of lizards

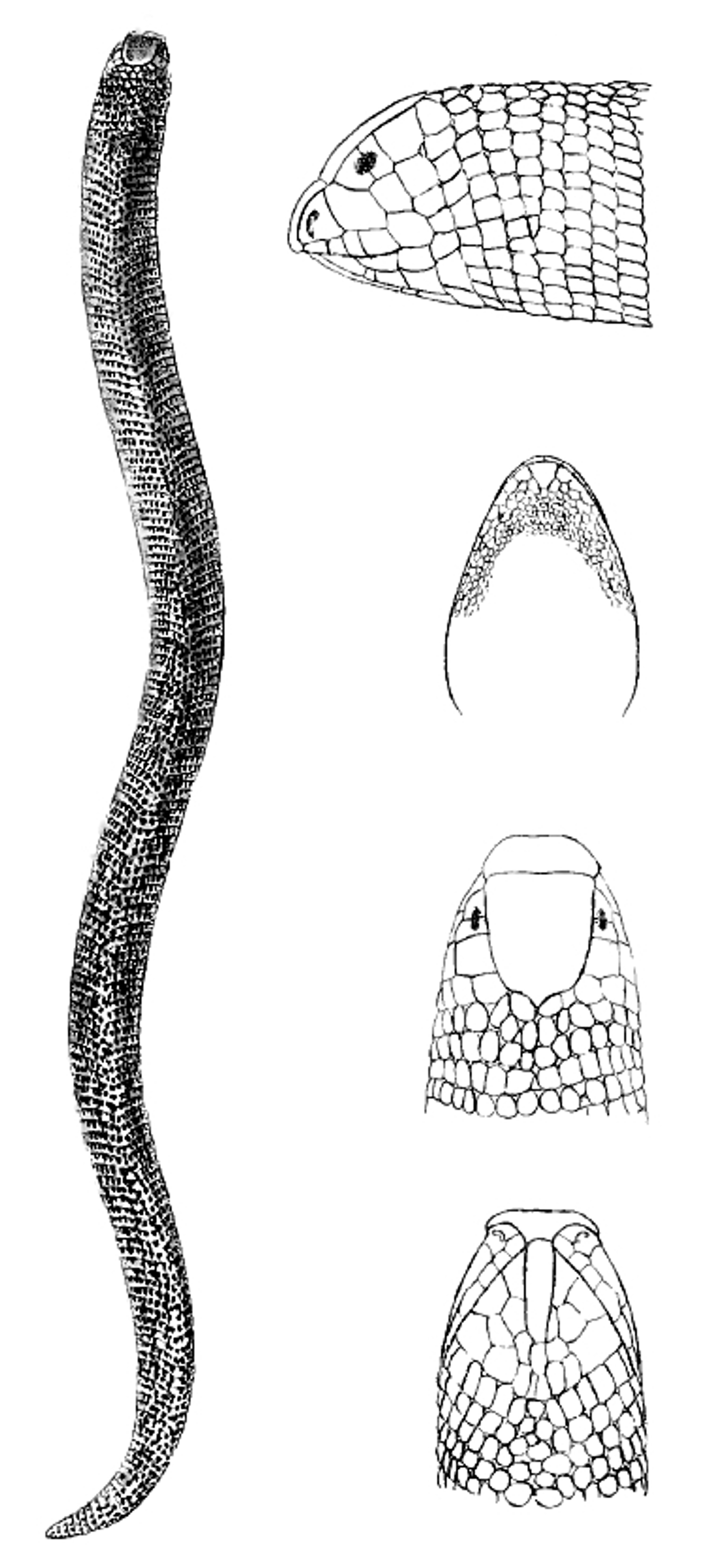
Agamodon arabicus

Agamodon is a small genus of worm lizards in the family Trogonophidae. They are found in the Horn of Africa and in the southern part of the Arabian Peninsula. The genus contains the following three species:

- Angled worm lizard Agamodon anguliceps Peters, 1882
- Arabian worm lizard Agamodon arabicus Anderson, 1901
- Flat worm lizard Agamodon compressus Mocquard, 1888
