= Horn of Africa =

Peninsula and geopolitical region

Coordinates: 09°N 48°E

Geography
- Area: 1,882,757 km^{2} (726,937 sq mi)

Administration
- Djibouti
- Capital city: Djibouti City
- Eritrea
- Capital city: Asmara
- Ethiopia
- Capital city: Addis Ababa
- Somalia
- Capital city: Mogadishu
- Somaliland (Note: Partially recognized.)
- Capital city: Hargeisa
- Puntland (Note: Suspended recognition of the Federal Government of Somalia.)
- Capital city: Garowe
- Jubaland
- Capital city: Bu'ale (de jure); Kismayo (de facto)
- Islamic Wilayat of Somalia (Note: Unrecognized quasi-state.)
- Capital city: Jilib

Demographics
- Population: 140,683,144 (2020)

Additional information
- Time zone: East Africa Time (UTC+03:00)

The Horn of Africa (HOA), also known as the Somali Peninsula, is a large peninsula and geopolitical region located in the easternmost part of mainland Africa. It is the fourth largest peninsula in the world and is composed of Somalia, Djibouti, Ethiopia, Eritrea, and the partially recognised state of Somaliland. Although not common, some broader geopolitical definitions include parts or all of Kenya and Sudan. It has been described as a region of significant geopolitical and strategic importance, since it is situated along the southern boundary of the Red Sea; extending hundreds of kilometers into the Gulf of Aden, Guardafui Channel, and Indian Ocean. It shares a maritime border with the Arabian Peninsula.

The Horn of Africa commonly is referred to simply as "the Horn," while inhabitants are sometimes colloquially termed Horn Africans or Horners. The term Horn Africans or Horners, aside from its geographic context, is considered a coherent population label. Anthropologically, "Horn Africans" is used in a stricter sense, reserved for the Cushitic and Ethio‑Semitic speaking peoples, who constitute the core historical and demographical population of the Horn, rather than all groups living within the peninsula's borders. Regional studies on the Horn of Africa are carried out in the fields of Ethiopian studies and Somali studies.

== Names ==
The peninsula has been known by various names. The Ancient Romans referred to it as Regio Aromatica or Regio Cinnamonifora after the aromatic plants found there, or as Regio Incognita for its poor coverage by classical Mediterranean cartography. In ancient and medieval times, the Horn of Africa was referred to as Bilad al Barbar ("Land of the Berbers"). It is also known as the Somali Peninsula, or in the Somali language as Geeska Afrika or Jasiiradda Soomaali. In other local languages it is called the direct equivalent of "Horn of Africa" or "African Horn": in Amharic: የአፍሪካ ቀንድ, romanized: yäafrika qänd, in Arabic: القرن الأفريقي, romanized: al-qarn al-'afrīqī, in Oromo: Gaanfaa Afrikaa, and in Tigrinya: ቀርኒ ኣፍሪቃ, romanized: q'ärnī afīrīqa.

== Usage ==
=== Geographic and geopolitical ===
The region geographically consists of Djibouti, Eritrea, Ethiopia, Somalia, and the partially recognised state of Somaliland. These nations protrude from the continent in the shape resembling a horn. Geopolitically, the region consists of these same nations. The term is occasionally used to be inclusive of neighbouring southeast African countries to distinguish the broader geopolitical definition of the Horn of Africa from narrower peninsular definitions.

=== Population ===
In genetics, linguistic and anthropological studies, the term is used as a label for those with a shared, distinct, commonality in their genetic structure, historical trajectories, cultural traits, and Afroasiatic languages. Genome‑wide studies of these populations identify two ancestry components largely restricted to the Horn: a differentiated African component termed 'Ethiopic' and a differentiated non‑African component termed 'Ethio‑Somali', which represent East African plus West Eurasian related admixture.

== Peoples ==
=== Demographics and linguistics ===
Map showcasing the distribution of the Afroasiatic languages in the horn

The main groups are the Cushitic-speaking Cushitic peoples, traditionally centered in the lowlands, and the Ethio-semitic-speaking Habesha peoples, who inhabit the Ethiopian and Eritrean highlands. The most spoken Cushitic languages are: Oromo with ~30 million speakers, Somali with ~28 million speakers,Sidama with ~3 million speakers, and Afar with ~3 million speakers. The most spoken Ethio-semitic languages are: Amharic with ~32 million speakers, and Tigrinya with ~10 million speakers. Other Afroasiatic languages with a significant number of speakers include the Cushitic Saho, Hadiyya, and Agaw languages; the Semitic Tigre, Arabic, Gurage, Harari, Silt'e and Argobba tongues

Languages belonging to the Nilo-Saharan language family are spoken in some areas by Nilotic ethnic minorities in Ethiopia and Eritrea. These tongues include the Nilo-Saharan Me'en and Mursi languages used in southwestern Ethiopia, and Kunama and Nara idioms spoken in parts of southern Eritrea. Omotic languages are also spoken by Omotic communities inhabiting Ethiopia's southern regions. Among these languages are Aari, Dizi, Gamo, Kafa, Hamer and Wolaytta.

The Horn has, both modern and historically, utilised several indigenous writing systems. Among these is Ge'ez script (ግዕዝ Gəʿəz) (also known as Ethiopic), which has been written in for at least 2000 years. It is an abugida script that was originally developed to write the Ge'ez language. In speech communities that use it, such as the Amharic and Tigrinya, the script is called fidäl (ፊደል), which means "script" or "alphabet". The Somali language was, for centuries, written using an adapted Arabic script known as wadaad's script. In the early 20th century, in response to a national campaign to settle on a writing script for the Somali language, which had since lost its ancient script, Osman Yusuf Kenadid, a Somali poet and cousin of the Sultan Yusuf Ali Kenadid, devised a phonetically sophisticated alphabet called Osmanya (also known as far soomaali; Osmanya: 𐒍𐒖𐒇 𐒈𐒝𐒑𐒛𐒐𐒘) for representing the sounds of Somali. Though no longer the official writing script in Somalia, the Osmanya script is available in the Unicode range 10480-104AF [from U+10480 – U+104AF (66688–66735)].

=== Genetics ===
==== Autosomal ====
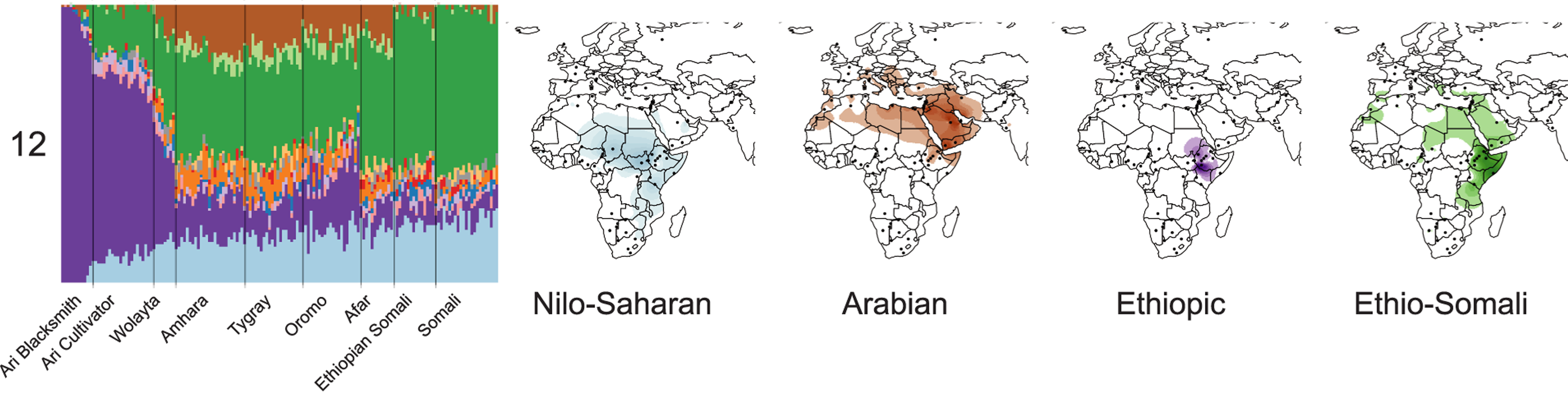
Admixture analysis of the Horn

Modern studies consistently show that Horn of Africans, those speaking Cushitic and Ethio‑Semitic, form a distinct cluster, deriving their genomes from a mix of local East African ancestry dubbed "Ethiopic" and substantial non‑African, West Eurasian, ancestry which Hodgson et al dub "Ethio-Somali"".

"The Semitic-Cushitic Ethiopians stand out as a relatively uniform set of individuals characterized by a strong (40%–50%) non-African component and an African component split between a broad East African and an apparently Ethiopia-specific component"

— Pagani et al, Ethiopian Genetic Diversity Reveals Linguistic Stratification and Complex Influences on the Ethiopian Gene Pool

Genome‑wide analyses indicate that HOAs carry 40–60 % or more of this non‑African component, detectable in ADMIXTURE and principal component analyses setting them apart from other sub‑Saharan African populations. This non‑African component is often represented in analyses as a distinct "Ethio‑Somali" ancestral component, interpreted as an ancient back‑migration into northeast Africa, tied to the Afro‑Asiatic linguistic dispersal. This back‑migration signal shows affinities to ancestries typical of the Levant and North Africa; in combination with the "Ethiopic" African component, this places Horn populations in an intermediate genetic position between sub‑Saharan Africans and Middle Eastern/European populations in PCA space.

In addition to this Cushitic, Ethio-Somali, Eurasian component, HOAs carry a secondary southern Arabian related component that entered via the Red Sea corridor. This component is detectable in autosomal studies as a distinct West Eurasian ancestry not overlapping with the older Ethio‑Somali signal.

"Thus, it is more likely that the genetic-geographic HOA-Arabia distance gradient reflects secondary admixture of Arabian migrants into HOA populations already carrying substantial non-African ancestry"

— Hodgson et al, Early Back-to-Africa Migration into the Horn of Africa

==== Unipaternal ====
===== Y-DNA =====
Haplogroup E-M35 has the highest frequency in Horners, particularly its descendent E-M78 with a high diversity of subclades suggesting an ancient presence in the region, followed by various lineages belonging to Haplogroup J, specifically J1 and J2, as well as Haplogroup T-M184. Cruciani et al found E-M35 in approximately 57% of both Oromo and Amhara individuals. The second most prevalent lineage Haplogroup J, has been found to exist at levels as high as 35.4% in the Amhara, of which 33.3% is of the type J1, while 2.1% is of J2 type. These lineages are also found in the neighbouring Tigrayans. Amongst Somalis, Haplogroup E-M78, specifically E-V32 is found in roughly 2/3 of the population with most of the remaining belonging either to T-M70 or J-P58.

===== DNA =====
Maternal ancestry in northern Ethiopian populations, including Tigrayans, is dominated by African L haplogroups, which comprise about 60% of lineages. Consistent with other regions and groups like Somalis where it also comprises around 60% of lineages. The remaining 40% belong primarily to Eurasian-associated lineages such as M1 and subclades of haplogroup N.

== History ==
=== Prehistory ===
Some of the earliest Homo sapiens fossils, the Omo remains (from ca. 233,000 years ago) and the Herto skull (from ca. 160,000 ago) have been found in the region, both in Ethiopia.

The findings of the Earliest Stone Tipped Projectiles from the Ethiopian Rift dated to more than 279,000 years ago "in combination with the existing archaeological, fossil and genetic evidence, isolate East Africa as a source of modern cultures and biology."

According to the Southern Dispersal scenario, the Southern route of the Out of Africa migration occurred in the Horn of Africa through the Bab el Mandeb. Today at the Bab-el-Mandeb straits, the Red Sea is about 12 miles (19 kilometres) wide, but 50,000 years ago it was much narrower and sea levels were 70 meters lower. Though the straits were never completely closed, there may have been islands in between which could be reached using simple rafts. Shell middens 125,000 years old have been found in Eritrea, indicating the diet of early humans included seafood obtained by beachcombing.

Ethiopian and Eritrean agriculture established the earliest known use of the seed grass teff (Poa abyssinica) between 4000 and 1000 BCE. Teff is used to make the flatbread injera/taita. Coffee originated in Ethiopia and has become a worldwide beverage.

Historian Christopher Ehret, cited genetic evidence which had identified the Horn of Africa as a source of a genetic marker "M35/215" Y-chromosome lineage for a significant population component which moved north from that region into Egypt and the Levant. Ehret argued that this genetic distribution paralleled the spread of the Afrasian language family with the movement of people from the Horn of Africa into Egypt and added a new demic component to the existing population of Egypt 17,000 years ago.

=== Ancient history ===
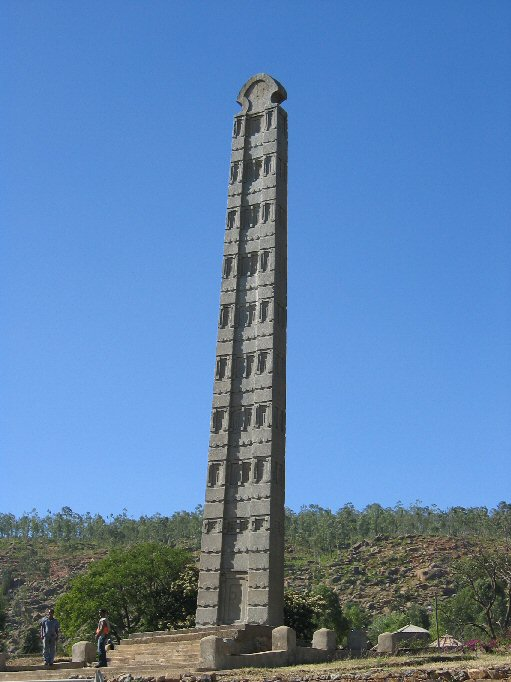
King Ezana's Stela at Aksum, symbol of the Aksumite civilization

The area comprising Somaliland, Somalia, Djibouti, the Red Sea coast of Eritrea and Sudan is considered the most likely location of the land known to the ancient Egyptians as Punt (or "Ta Netjeru", meaning god's land), whose first mention dates to the 25th century BCE.

Dʿmt was a kingdom located in Eritrea and northern Ethiopia, which existed during the 8th and 7th centuries BCE. With its capital probably at Yeha, the kingdom developed irrigation schemes, used plows, grew millet, and made iron tools and weapons. After the fall of Dʿmt in the 5th century BCE, the plateau came to be dominated by smaller successor kingdoms, until the rise of one of these kingdoms during the 1st century, the Aksumite Kingdom, which was able to reunite the area.

The Kingdom of Aksum (also known as the Aksumite Empire) was an ancient state located in the Eritrea and Ethiopian Highlands, which thrived between the 1st and 7th centuries CE. A major player in the commerce between the Roman Empire and Ancient India, Aksum's rulers facilitated trade by minting their own currency. The state established its hegemony over the declining Kingdom of Kush and regularly entered the politics of the kingdoms on the Arabian Peninsula, eventually extending its rule over the region with the conquest of the Himyarite Kingdom. Under Ezana (fl. 320–360), the kingdom of Aksum became the first major empire to adopt Christianity, and was named by Mani as one of the four great powers of his time, along with Persia, Rome and China.

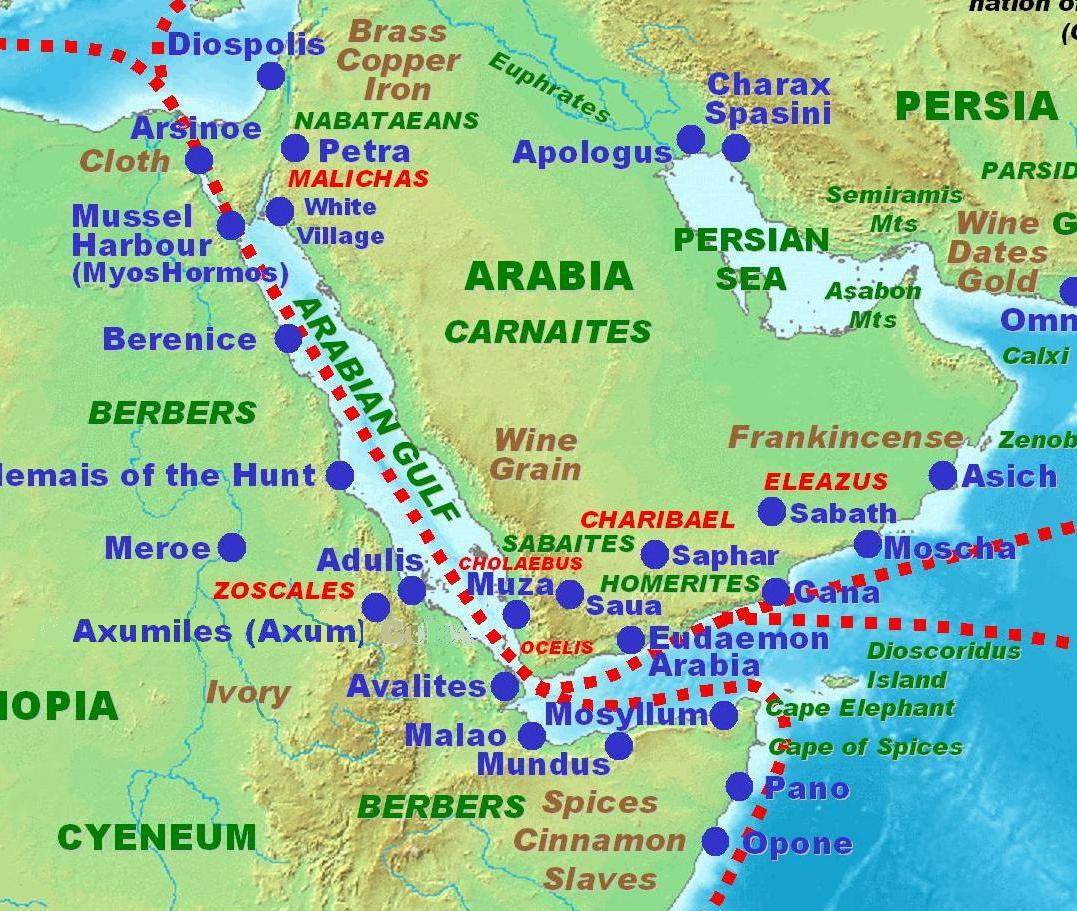
Ancient trading centers in the Horn of Africa and the Arabian Peninsula according to the Periplus of the Erythraean Sea

Somalia was an important link in the Horn, connecting the region's commerce with the rest of the ancient world. Somali sailors and merchants were the main suppliers of frankincense, myrrh and spices, all of which were valuable luxuries to the Ancient Egyptians, Phoenicians, Mycenaeans, Babylonians and Romans. The Romans consequently began to refer to the region as Regio Aromatica. In the classical era, several flourishing Somali city-states such as Opone, Mosylon and Malao competed with the Sabaeans, Parthians and Axumites for the rich Indo-Greco-Roman trade.

The birth of Islam opposite the Horn's Red Sea coast meant that local merchants and sailors living on the Arabian Peninsula gradually came under the influence of the new religion through their converted Arab Muslim trading partners. With the migration of Muslim families from the Islamic world to the Horn in the early centuries of Islam, and the peaceful conversion of the local population by Muslim scholars in the following centuries, the ancient city-states eventually transformed into Islamic Mogadishu, Berbera, Zeila, Barawa and Merka, which were part of the Barbara civilization. The city of Mogadishu came to be known as the "City of Islam" and controlled the East African gold trade for several centuries.

=== Middle Ages and Early Modern era ===
A copy of 17th century philosophical and ethical treatise by Ethiopian philosopher Zara Yaqob

During the Middle Ages, several powerful empires dominated the regional trade in the Horn, including the Adal Sultanate, the Ajuran Sultanate, the Ethiopian Empire, the Zagwe dynasty, and the Sultanate of the Geledi.

The Sultanate of Showa, established in 896, was one of the oldest local Islamic states. It was centered in the former Shewa province in central Ethiopia. The polity was succeeded by the Sultanate of Ifat around 1285. Ifat was governed from its capital at Zeila in Somaliland and was the easternmost district of the former Shewa Sultanate.

The Adal Sultanate was a medieval multi-ethnic Muslim state centered in the Horn region. At its height, it controlled large parts of Somalia, Ethiopia, Djibouti and Eritrea. Many of the historic cities in the region, such as Amud, Maduna, Abasa, Berbera, Zeila and Harar, flourished during the kingdom's golden age. This period that left behind numerous courtyard houses, mosques, shrines and walled enclosures. Under the leadership of rulers such as Sabr ad-Din II, Mansur ad-Din, Jamal ad-Din II, Shams ad-Din, General Mahfuz and Ahmad ibn Ibrahim al-Ghazi, Adalite armies continued the struggle against the Solomonic dynasty, a campaign historically known as the Conquest of Abyssinia or Futuh al Habash.

Through a strong centralized administration and an aggressive military stance towards invaders, the Ajuran Sultanate successfully resisted an Oromo invasion from the west and a Portuguese incursion from the east during the Gaal Madow and the Ajuran-Portuguese wars. Trading routes dating from the ancient and early medieval periods of Somali maritime enterprise were strengthened or re-established, and the state left behind an extensive architectural legacy. Many of the hundreds of ruined castles and fortresses that dot the landscape of Somalia today are attributed to Ajuran engineers, including a lot of the pillar tomb fields, necropolises and ruined cities built during that era. The royal family, the House of Gareen, expanded its territories and established its hegemonic rule through a combination of warfare, trade linkages and alliances.

The Zagwe dynasty ruled many parts of modern Ethiopia and Eritrea from approximately 1137 to 1270. The name of the dynasty comes from the Cushitic-speaking Agaw people of northern Ethiopia. From 1270 onwards for many centuries, the Solomonic dynasty ruled the Ethiopian Empire.

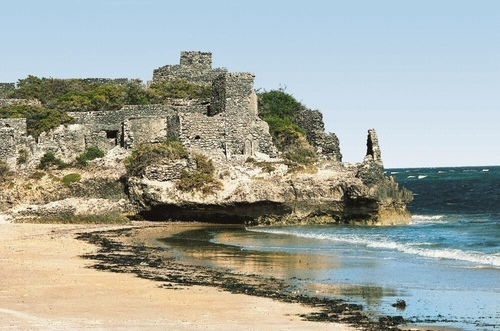
The citadel in Gondershe, an important city in the medieval Ajuran Sultanate

In 1270, the Amhara nobleman Yekuno Amlak, who claimed descent from the last Aksumite king and ultimately the Queen of Sheba, overthrew the Agaw Zagwe dynasty at the Battle of Ansata, ushering his reign as Emperor of Ethiopia. While initially a rather small and politically unstable entity, the empire managed to expand significantly during the crusades of Amda Seyon I (1314–1344) and his successors, becoming the dominant force in East Africa.

In the early 15th century, Ethiopia sought to make diplomatic contact with European kingdoms for the first time since Aksumite times. A letter from King Henry IV of England to the Emperor of Abyssinia survives. In 1428, the Emperor Yeshaq sent two emissaries to Alfonso V of Aragon, who sent return emissaries who failed to complete the return trip.

The first continuous relations with a European country began in 1508 with Portugal under Emperor Lebna Dengel, who had just inherited the throne from his father. This proved to be an important development, for when Abyssinia was subjected to the attacks of the Adal Sultanate General and Imam Ahmad ibn Ibrahim al-Ghazi (called "Gurey" or "Grañ", both meaning "the Left-handed"), Portugal assisted the Ethiopian emperor by sending weapons and four hundred men, who helped his son Gelawdewos defeat Ahmad and re-establish his rule. This Ethiopian–Adal War was one of the first proxy wars in the region as the Ottoman Empire, and Portugal took sides in the conflict.

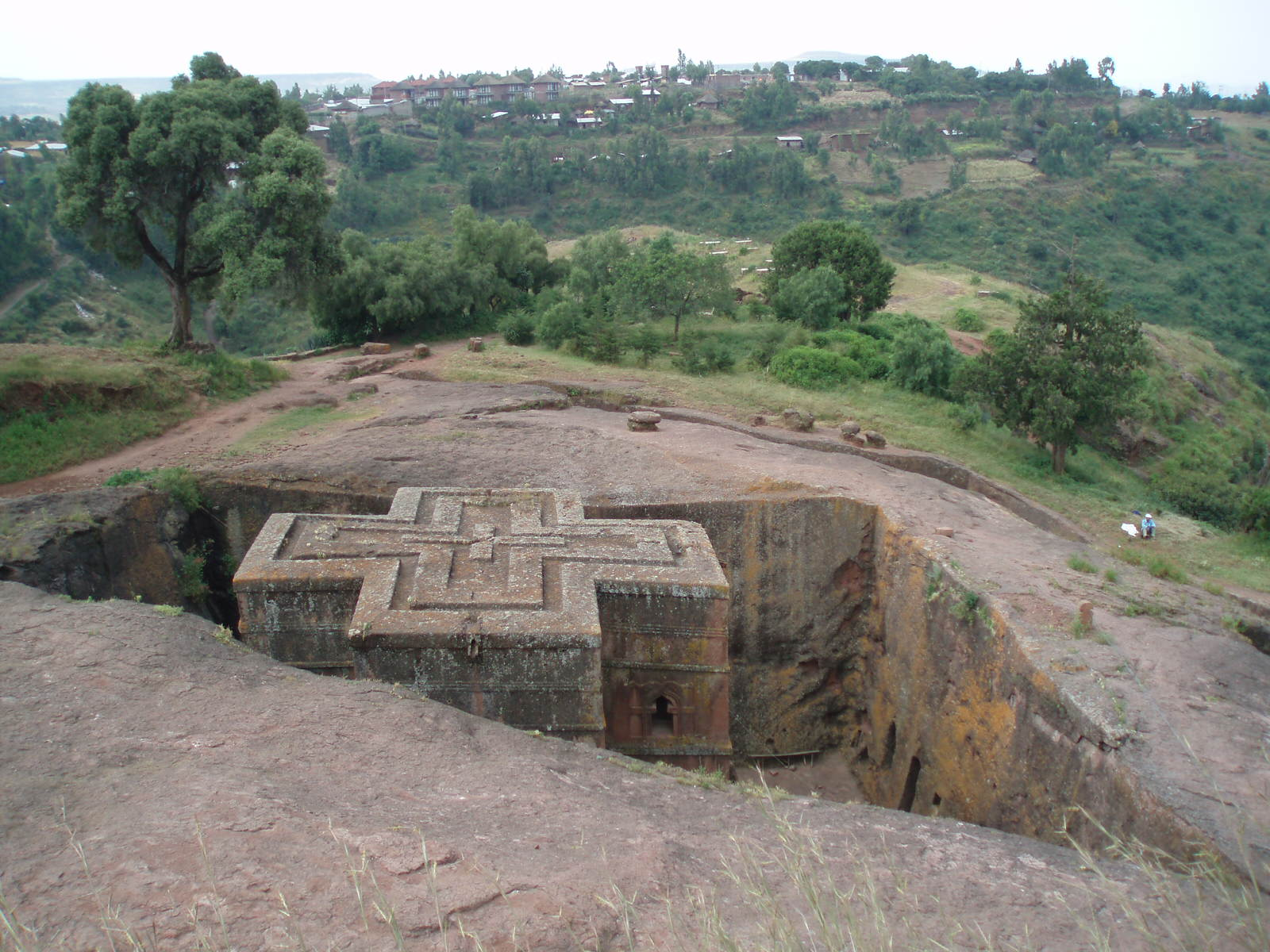
The Lalibela churches carved by the Zagwe dynasty in the 12th century

When Emperor Susenyos converted to Roman Catholicism in 1624, years of revolt and civil unrest followed resulting in thousands of deaths. The Jesuit missionaries had offended the Orthodox faith of the local Ethiopians. On 25 June 1632, Susenyos's son, Emperor Fasilides, declared the state religion to again be Ethiopian Orthodox Christianity, and expelled the Jesuit missionaries and other Europeans.

During the end of 18th and the beginning of 19th century the Yejju dynasty (more specifically, the Warasek) ruled north Ethiopia changing the official language of Amhara people to Afaan Oromo, including inside the court of Gondar which was capital of the empire. Founded by Ali I of Yejju several successive descendants of him and Abba Seru Gwangul ruled with their army coming from mainly their clan the Yejju Oromo tribe as well as Wollo and Raya Oromo.

The Sultanate of the Geledi was a Somali kingdom administered by the Gobroon dynasty, which ruled parts of the Horn of Africa during the 18th and 19th centuries. It was established by the Ajuran soldier Ibrahim Adeer, who had defeated various vassals of the Ajuran Empire and established the House of Gobroon. The dynasty reached its apex under the successive reigns of Sultan Yusuf Mahamud Ibrahim, who successfully consolidated Gobroon power during the Bardera wars, and Sultan Ahmed Yusuf, who forced regional powers such as the Omani Empire to submit tribute.

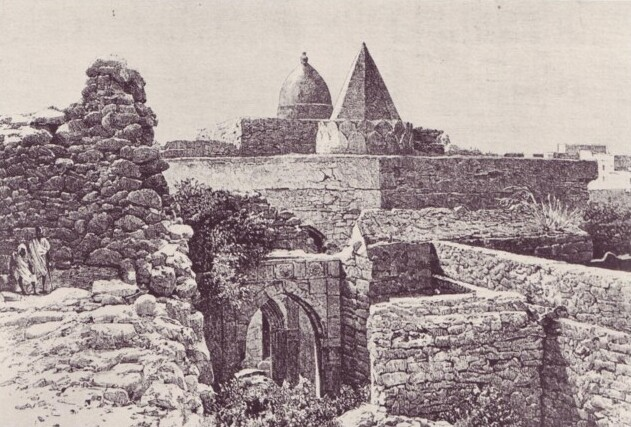
Engraving of the 13th century Fakr ad-Din Mosque built by Fakr ad-Din, the first Sultan of the Sultanate of Mogadishu

The Isaaq Sultanate was a Somali kingdom that ruled parts of the Horn of Africa during the 18th and 19th centuries. It spanned the territories of the Isaaq clan, descendants of the Banu Hashim clan, in modern-day Somaliland and Ethiopia. The sultanate was governed by the Reer Guled branch of the Eidagale sub-clan established by the first sultan, Sultan Guled Abdi. The sultanate is the pre-colonial predecessor to the modern Somaliland.

According to oral tradition, prior to the Guled dynasty the Isaaq clan-family were ruled by a dynasty of the Tolje'lo branch starting from, descendants of Ahmed nicknamed Tol Je'lo, the eldest son of Sheikh Ishaaq's Harari wife. There were eight Tolje'lo rulers in total, starting with Boqor Harun (Somali: Boqor Haaruun) who ruled the Isaaq Sultanate for centuries starting from the 13th century. The last Tolje'lo ruler Garad Dhuh Barar (Somali: Dhuux Baraar) was overthrown by a coalition of Isaaq clans. The once strong Tolje'lo clan were scattered and took refuge amongst the Habr Awal with whom they still mostly live.

The Majeerteen Sultanate (Migiurtinia) was another prominent Somali sultanate based in the Horn region. Ruled by King Osman Mahamuud during its golden age, it controlled much of northeastern and central Somalia in the 19th and early 20th centuries. The polity had all of the organs of an integrated modern state and maintained a robust trading network. It entered into treaties with foreign powers and exerted strong centralized authority on the domestic front. Much of the Sultanate's former domain is today coextensive with the autonomous Puntland region in northern Somalia.

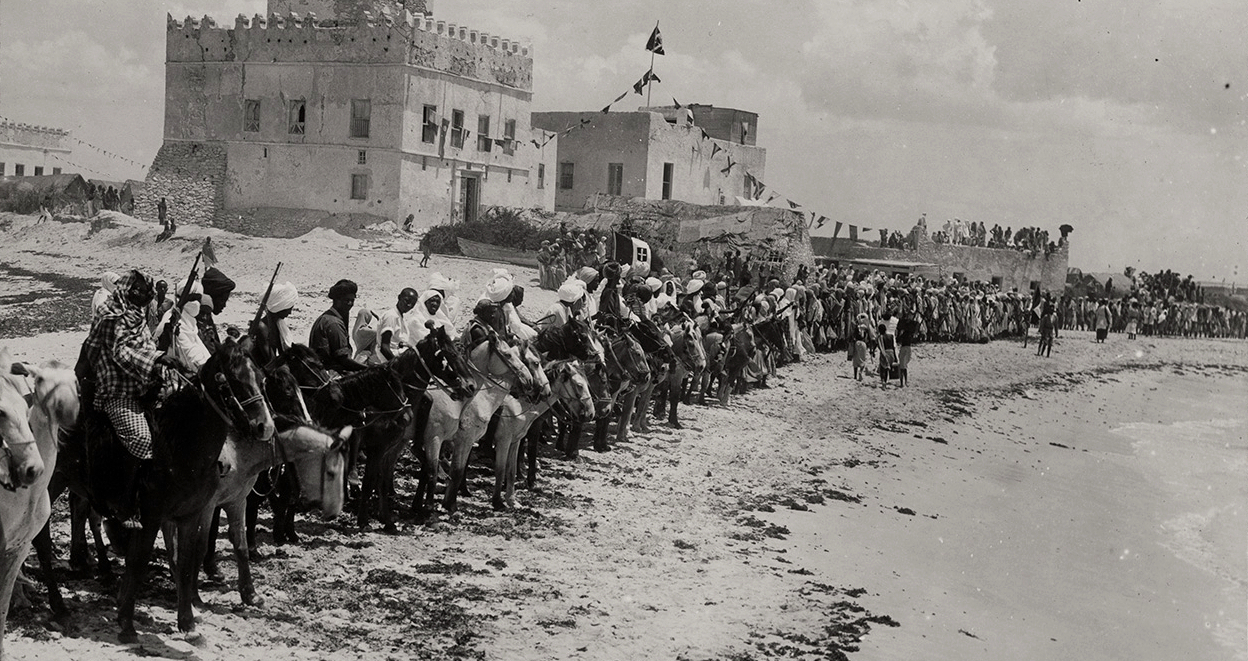
Hobyo Sultanate cavalry and fort with Italian flag flying from the battlements (Italian Protectorate period, 1924)

The Sultanate of Hobyo was a 19th-century Somali kingdom founded by Sultan Yusuf Ali Kenadid. Kenadid's goal was to seize control of the neighboring Majeerteen Sultanate, which was then ruled by his cousin Boqor Osman Mahamuud. He was unsuccessful, and was forced into exile in Yemen. A decade later, in the 1870s, Kenadid returned from the Arabian Peninsula with a band of Hadhrami musketeers and a group of devoted lieutenants with whom he established the kingdom of Hobyo, which ruled much of northern and central Somalia during the early modern period.

=== Modern history ===
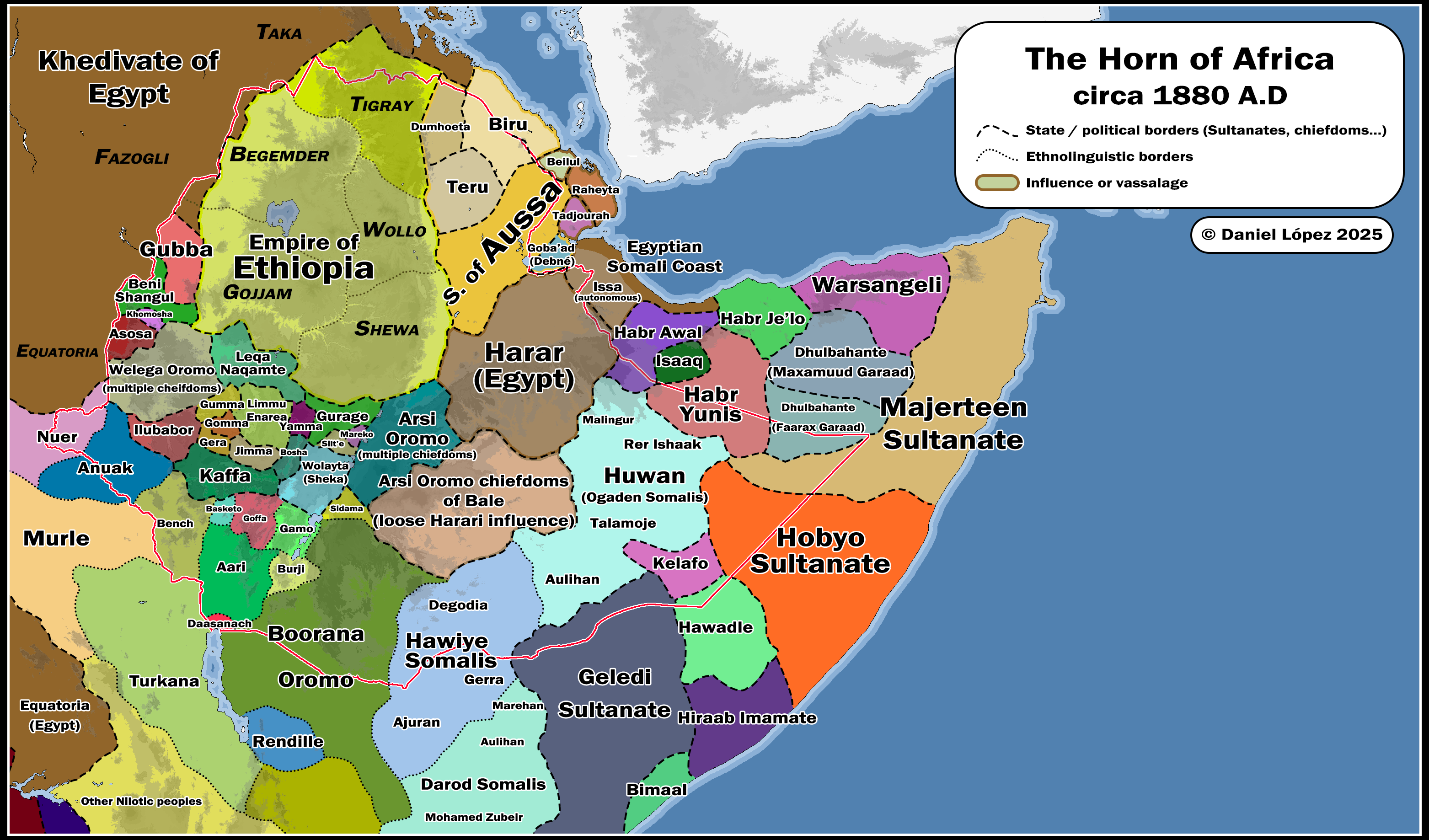
The Horn of Africa before the Scramble for Africa (c. 1880)

In the period following the opening of the Suez Canal in 1869, when European powers scrambled for territory in Africa and tried to establish coaling stations for their ships, Italy invaded and occupied Eritrea. On 1 January 1890, Eritrea officially became a colony of Italy. In 1896 further Italian incursion into the horn was decisively halted by Ethiopian forces. By 1936, Eritrea became a province of Italian East Africa (Africa Orientale Italiana), along with Ethiopia and Italian Somaliland. By 1941, Eritrea had about 760,000 inhabitants, including 70,000 Italians. The Commonwealth armed forces, along with the Ethiopian patriotic resistance, expelled those of Italy in 1941, and took over the area's administration. The British continued to administer the territory under a UN Mandate until 1951, when Eritrea was federated with Ethiopia, per UN resolution 390 A (V) adopted December 1950.

The strategic importance of Eritrea, due to its Red Sea coastline and mineral resources, was the main cause for the federation with Ethiopia, which in turn led to Eritrea's annexation as Ethiopia's 14th province in 1962. This was the culmination of a gradual process of takeover by the Ethiopian authorities, a process which included a 1959 edict establishing the compulsory teaching of Amharic, the main language of Ethiopia, in all Eritrean schools. The lack of regard for the Eritrean population led to the formation of an independence movement in the early 1960s (1961), which erupted into a 30-year war against successive Ethiopian governments that ended in 1991. Following a UN-supervised referendum in Eritrea (dubbed UNOVER) in which the Eritrean people overwhelmingly voted for independence, Eritrea declared its independence and gained international recognition in 1993. In 1998, a border dispute with Ethiopia led to the Eritrean-Ethiopian War.

From 1862 until 1894, the land to the north of the Gulf of Tadjoura situated in modern-day Djibouti was called Obock and was ruled by Somali and Afar Sultans, local authorities with whom France signed various treaties between 1883 and 1887 to first gain a foothold in the region. In 1894, Léonce Lagarde established a permanent French administration in the city of Djibouti and named the region Côte française des Somalis (French Somaliland), a name which continued until 1967.

In 1958, on the eve of neighboring Somalia's independence in 1960, a referendum was held in the territory to decide whether to join the Somali Republic or to remain with France. The referendum favoured continued association with France, partly due to a combined yes vote by the sizable Afar ethnic group and resident Europeans. There were reports of widespread vote rigging, with the French expelling thousands of Somalis before the polls. The majority of those who voted no were Somalis who were strongly in favour of joining a united Somalia, as had been proposed by Mahmoud Harbi, Vice President of the Government Council. Harbi was killed in a plane crash two years later. Djibouti finally gained its independence from France in 1977. Hassan Gouled Aptidon, a Somali politician who had campaigned for a yes vote in the referendum of 1958, became the nation's first president (1977–1999). In early 2011, the Djiboutian citizenry took part in a series of protests against the long-serving government, which were associated with the larger Arab Spring demonstrations. The unrest eventually subsided by April of the year, and Djibouti's ruling People's Rally for Progress party was re-elected to office.

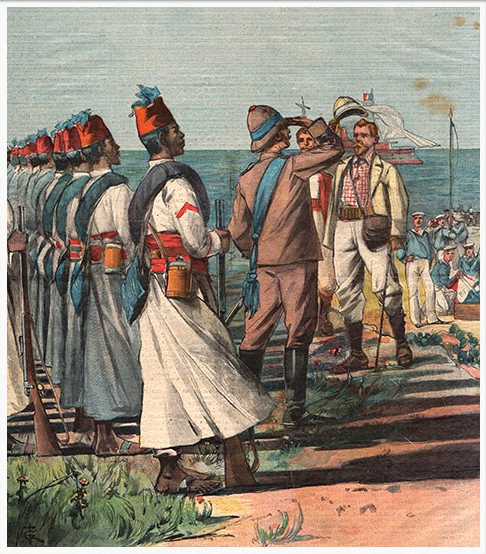
Eritrean Ascaris, colonial troops of the Italian Army, in a 1898 wood engraving

The Dervish existed for 25 years, from 1895 until 1920. The Turks named Hassan Emir of the Somali nation, and the Germans promised to officially recognize any territories the Dervishes were to acquire. After a quarter of a century of holding the British at bay, the Dervishes were finally defeated in 1920 as a direct consequence of Britain's new policy of aerial bombardment. As a result of this bombardment, former Dervish territories were turned into a protectorate of Britain. Italy faced similar opposition from Somali Sultans and armies, and did not acquire full control of modern Somalia until the Fascist era in late 1927. This occupation lasted until 1941, and was replaced by a British military administration. Former British Somaliland would remain, along with Italian Somaliland, a trusteeship of Italy, between 1950 and 1960. The Union of the two countries in 1960 formed the Somali Republic. A civilian government was formed, and on 20 July 1961, through a popular referendum, the constitution drafted in 1960 was ratified.

Due to its longstanding ties with the Arab world, the Somali Republic was accepted in 1974 as a member of the Arab League. During the same year, the nation's former socialist administration also chaired the Organization of African Unity, the predecessor of the African Union. In 1991, the Somali Civil War broke out, which saw the dissolving of the union and Somaliland regaining its independence, along with the collapse of the central government and the emergence of numerous autonomous polities, including the Puntland administration in the north. Somalia's inhabitants subsequently reverted to local forms of conflict resolution, either secular, Islamic or customary law, with a provision for appeal of all sentences. A Transitional Federal Government was subsequently created in 2004. The Federal Government of Somalia was established on 20 August 2012, concurrent with the end of the TFG's interim mandate. It represents the first permanent central government in the country since the start of the civil war. The Federal Parliament of Somalia serves as the government's legislative branch.

Modern Ethiopia and its current borders are a result of significant territorial reduction in the north and expansion in the east and south toward its present borders, owing to several migrations, commercial integration, treaties as well as conquests, particularly by Emperor Menelik II and Ras Gobena. From the central province of Shoa, Menelik set off to subjugate and incorporate 'the lands and people of the South, East and West into an empire.' He did this with the help of Ras Gobena's Shewan Oromo militia, began expanding his kingdom to the south and east, expanding into areas that had not been held since the invasion of Ahmad ibn Ibrihim al-Ghazi, and other areas that had never been under his rule, resulting in the borders of Ethiopia of today. Menelik had signed the Treaty of Wichale with Italy in May 1889, in which Italy would recognize Ethiopia's sovereignty so long as Italy could control a small area of northern Tigray (part of modern Eritrea). In return, Italy was to provide Menelik with arms and support him as emperor. The Italians used the time between the signing of the treaty and its ratification by the Italian government to further expand their territorial claims. Italy began a state funded program of resettlement for landless Italians in Eritrea, which increased tensions between the Eritrean peasants and the Italians. This conflict erupted in the Battle of Adwa on 1 March 1896, in which Italy's colonial forces were defeated by the Ethiopians.

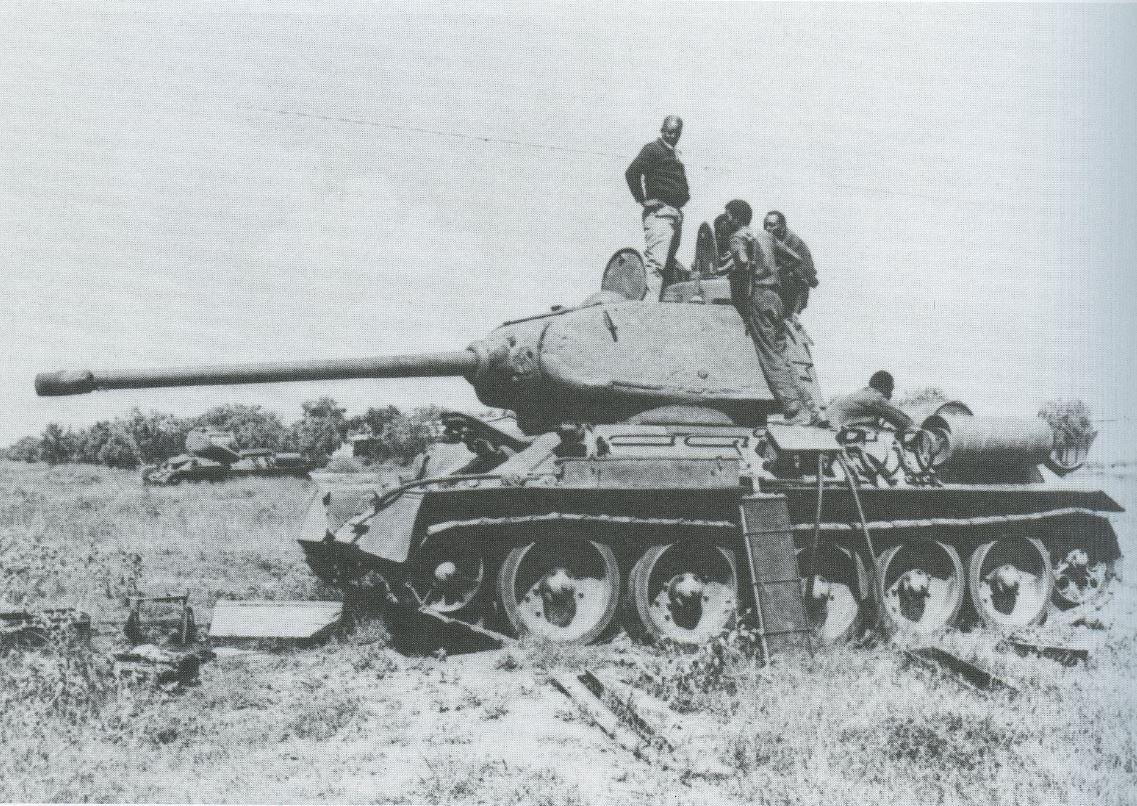
Somali engineers repair a captured Ethiopian T-34/85 Model 1969 tank for use by the Western Somali Liberation Front during the Ogaden War, March 1978.

The early 20th century in Ethiopia was marked by the reign of Emperor Haile Selassie I, who came to power after Iyasu V was deposed. In 1935, Haile Selassie's troops fought and lost the Second Italo-Abyssinian War, after which Italy annexed Ethiopia to Italian East Africa. Haile Selassie subsequently appealed to the League of Nations, delivering an address that made him a worldwide figure and 1935's Time magazine Man of the Year. Following the entry of Italy into World War II, British Empire forces, together with patriot Ethiopian fighters, liberated Ethiopia during the East African Campaign in 1941.

Haile Selassie's reign came to an end in 1974, when a Soviet-backed Marxist-Leninist military junta, the Derg led by Mengistu Haile Mariam, deposed him, and established a one-party communist state, which was called the People's Democratic Republic of Ethiopia. In July 1977, the Ogaden War broke out after the Somalia government of Siad Barre sought to incorporate the predominantly Somali-inhabited Ogaden region into a Pan-Somali Greater Somalia. By September 1977, the Somali army controlled 90 percent of the Ogaden, but was later forced to withdraw after Ethiopia's Derg received assistance from the USSR, Cuba, South Yemen, East Germany and North Korea, including around 15,000 Cuban combat troops.

In 1989, the Tigrayan Peoples' Liberation Front (TPLF) merged with other ethnically based opposition movements to form the Ethiopian Peoples' Revolutionary Democratic Front (EPRDF), and eventually managed to overthrow Mengistu's dictatorial regime in 1991. A transitional government, composed of an 87-member Council of Representatives and guided by a national charter that functioned as a transitional constitution, was then set up. The first free and democratic election took place later in 1995, when Ethiopia's longest-serving prime minister Meles Zenawi was elected to office. As with other nations in the Horn region, Ethiopia maintained its historically close relations with countries in the Middle East during this period of change. Zenawi died in 2012, but his Ethiopian People's Revolutionary Democratic Front (EPRDF) party remains the ruling political coalition in Ethiopia.

== Geography ==
=== Geology and climate ===
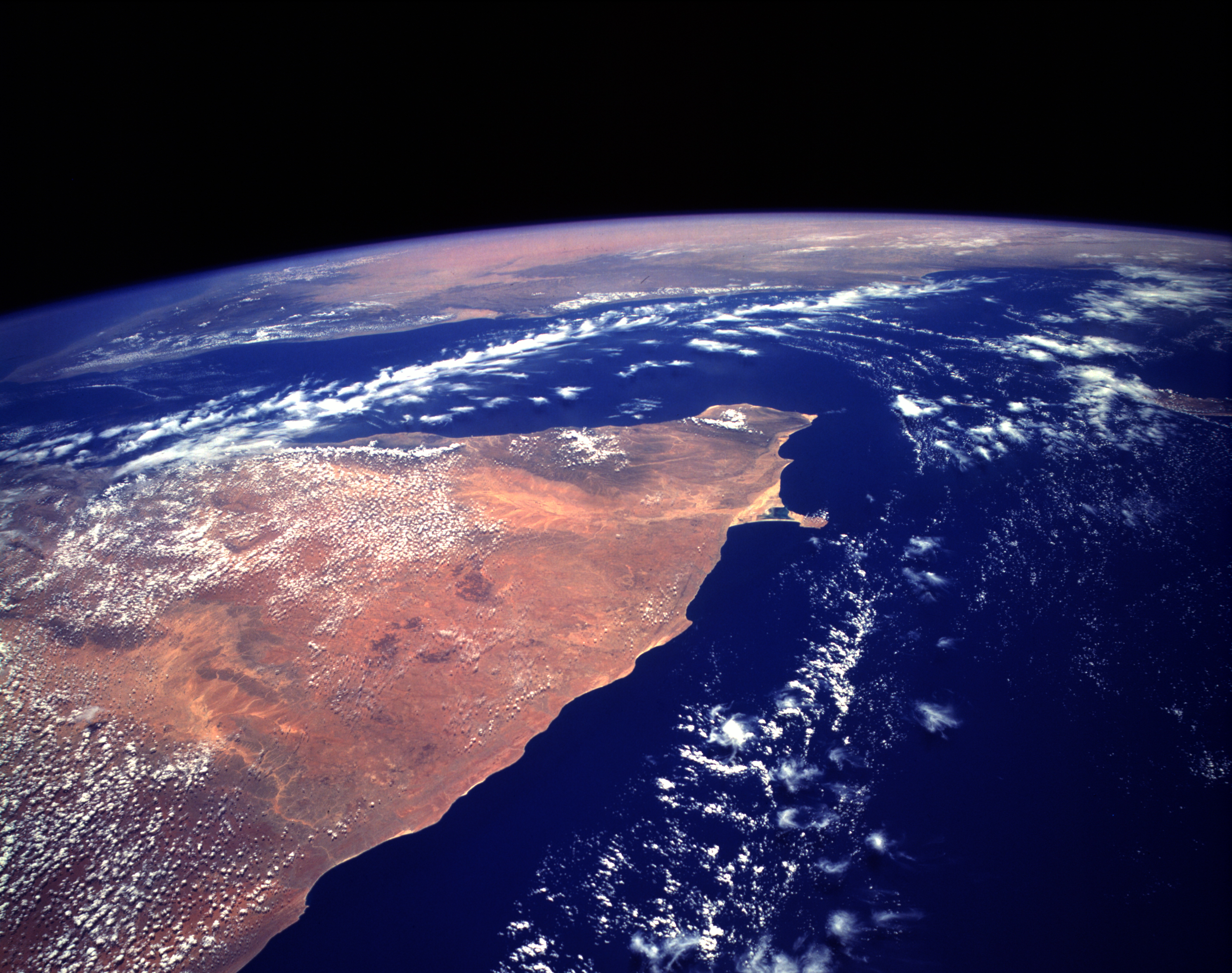
The Horn of Africa as seen from the NASA Space Shuttle in May 1993. The orange and tan colors in this image indicate a largely arid to semiarid climate.

The Horn of Africa is almost equidistant from the equator and the Tropic of Cancer. It consists chiefly of mountains uplifted through the formation of the Great Rift Valley, a fissure in the Earth's crust extending from Turkey to Mozambique and marking the separation of the African and Arabian tectonic plates. Mostly mountainous, the region arose through faults resulting from the Rift Valley.

Geologically, the Horn and Yemen once formed a single landmass around 18 million years ago, before the Gulf of Aden rifted and separated the Horn region from the Arabian Peninsula. The Somali Plate is bounded on the west by the East African Rift, which stretches south from the triple junction in the Afar Depression, and an undersea continuation of the rift extending southward offshore. The northern boundary is the Aden Ridge along the coast of Saudi Arabia. The eastern boundary is the Central Indian Ridge, the northern portion of which is known as the Carlsberg Ridge. The southern boundary is the Southwest Indian Ridge.

Extensive glaciers once covered the Simien and Bale Mountains but melted at the beginning of the Holocene. The mountains descend in a huge escarpment to the Red Sea and more steadily to the Indian Ocean. Socotra is a small island in the Indian Ocean off the coast of Somalia. Its size is 3,600 km^{2} (1,400 sq mi) and it is a territory of Yemen.

The lowlands of the Horn are generally arid in spite of their proximity to the equator. This is because the winds of the tropical monsoons that give seasonal rains to the Sahel and the Sudan blow from the west. Consequently, they lose their moisture before reaching Djibouti and northern part of Somalia, with the result that most of the Horn receives little rainfall during the monsoon season.

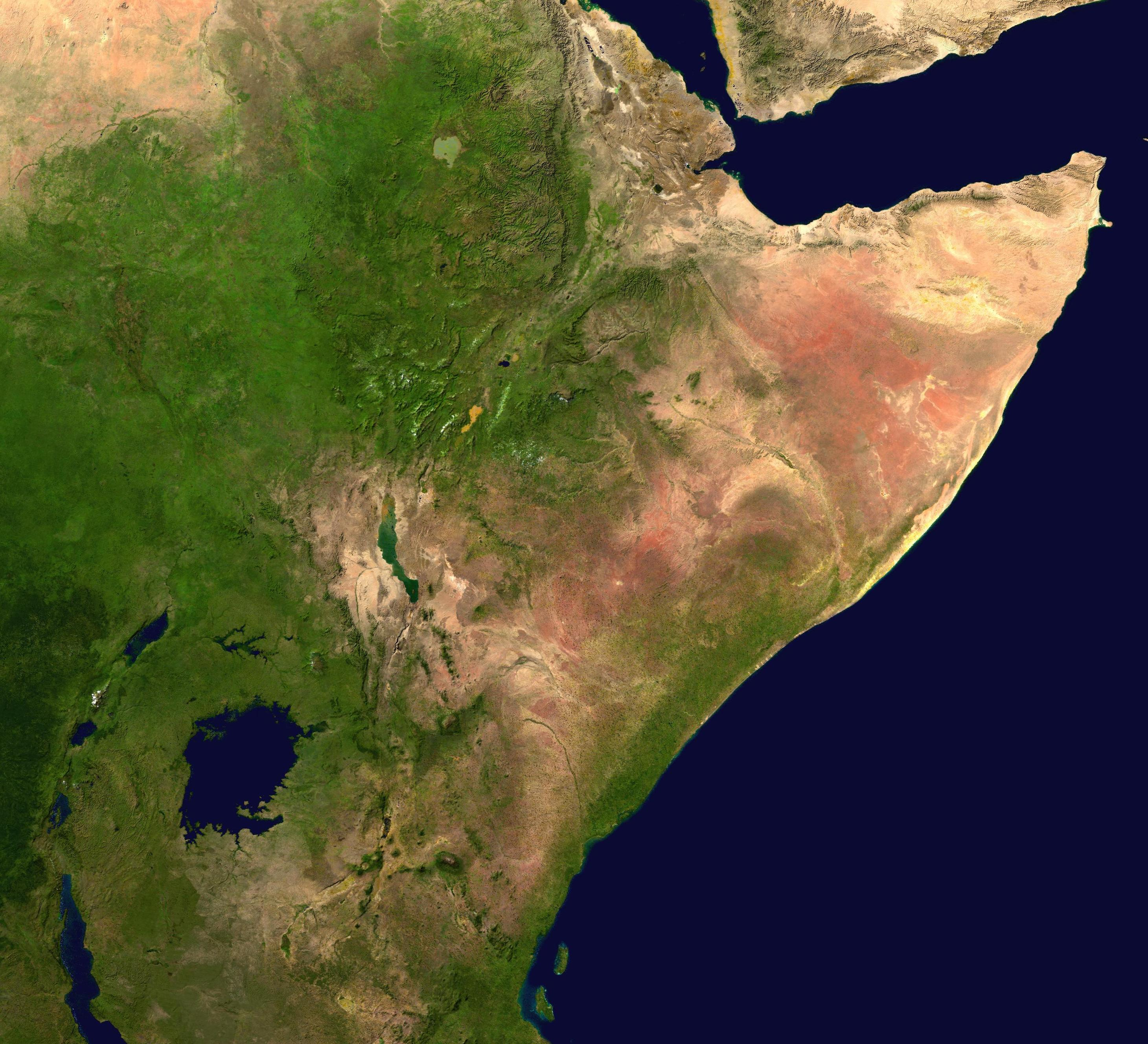
The Horn of Africa. NASA image

In the mountains of Ethiopia, many areas receive over 2,000 mm (79 in) per year, and even Asmara receives an average of 570 mm (22 in). This rainfall is the sole source of water for many areas outside Ethiopia, including Egypt. In the winter, the northeasterly trade winds do not provide any moisture except in mountainous areas of northern Somalia, where rainfall in late autumn can produce annual totals as high as 500 mm (20 in). On the eastern coast, a strong upwelling and the fact that the winds blow parallel to the coast means annual rainfall can be as low as 50 mm (2.0 in).

The climate in Ethiopia varies considerably between regions. It is generally hotter in the lowlands and temperate on the plateau. At Addis Ababa, which ranges from 2,200 to 2,600 m (7,218 to 8,530 ft), maximum temperature is 26 °C (78.8 °F) and minimum 4 °C (39.2 °F). The weather is usually sunny and dry, but the short (belg) rains occur from February to April and the big (meher) rains from mid-June to mid-September. The Danakil Desert stretches across 100,000 km^{2} of arid terrain in northeast Ethiopia, southern Eritrea, and northwestern Djibouti. The area is known for its volcanoes and extreme heat, with daily temperatures over 45 °C and often surpassing 50 °C. It has a number of lakes formed by lava flows that dammed up several valleys. Among these are Lake Asale (116 m below sea level) and Lake Giuletti/Afrera (80 m below sea level), both of which possess cryptodepressions in the Danakil Depression. The Afrera contains many active volcanoes, including the Maraho, Dabbahu, Afdera and Erta Ale.

In Somalia, there is not much seasonal variation in climate. Hot conditions prevail year-round along with periodic monsoon winds and irregular rainfall. Mean daily maximum temperatures range from 28 to 43 °C (82 to 109 °F), except at higher elevations along the eastern seaboard, where the effects of a cold offshore current can be felt. Somalia has only two permanent rivers, the Jubba and the Shabele, both of which begin in the Ethiopian Highlands.

=== Ecology ===
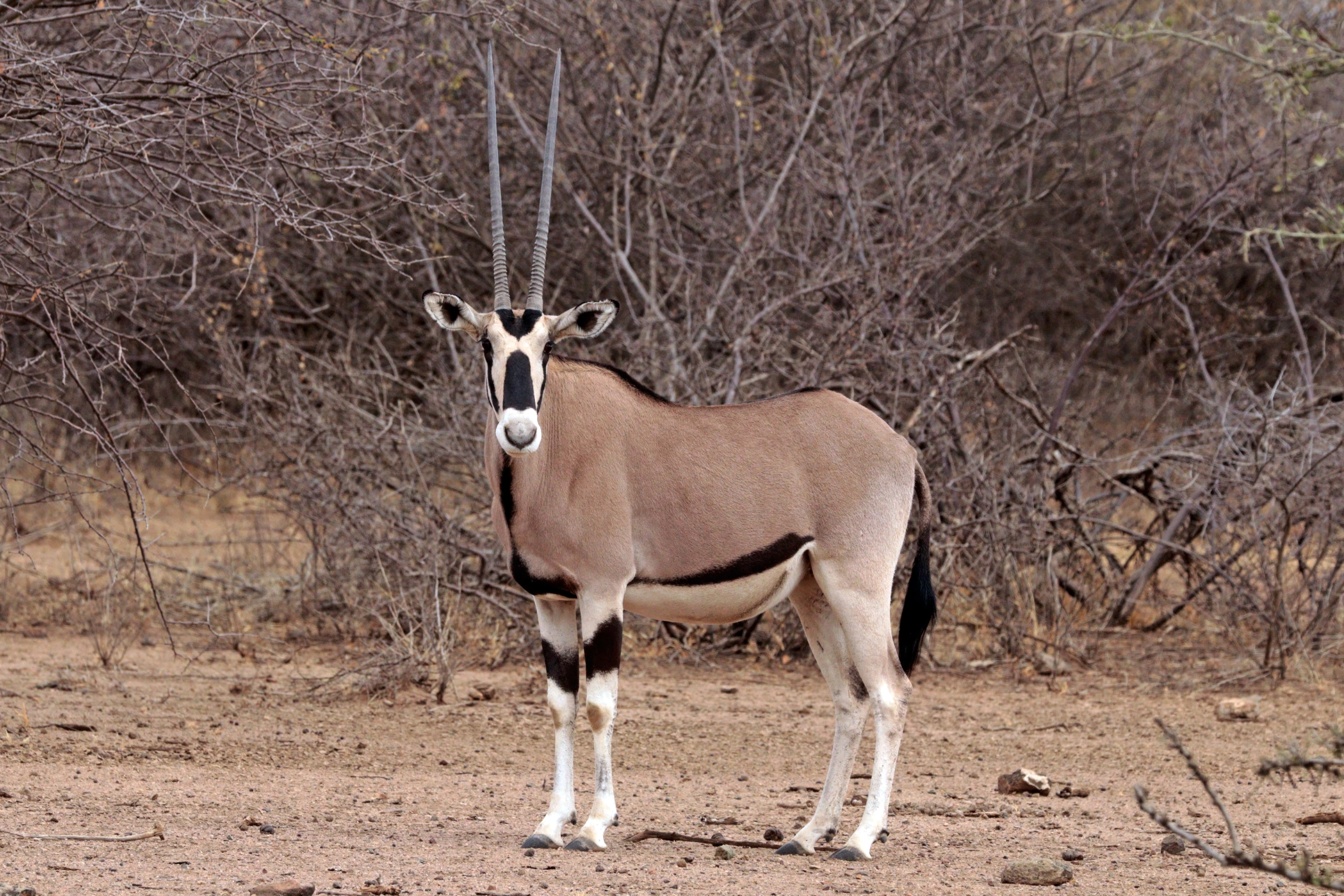
Oryx beisa beisa is found throughout the Horn of Africa.

About 220 mammals are found in the Horn of Africa. Among threatened species of the region, there are several antelopes such as the beira, the dibatag, the silver dikdik and the Speke's gazelle. Other remarkable species include the Somali wild ass, the desert warthog, the hamadryas baboon, the Somali pygmy gerbil, the ammodile, and the Speke's pectinator. The Grevy's zebra is the unique wild equid of the region. There are predators such as spotted hyena, striped hyena and African leopard. The endangered painted hunting dog had populations in the Horn of Africa, but pressures from human exploitation of habitat along with warfare have reduced or extirpated this canid in this region.

Some important bird species of the Horn are the black boubou, the golden-winged grosbeak, the Warsangli linnet, and the Djibouti spurfowl.

The Horn of Africa holds more endemic reptiles than any other region in Africa, with over 285 species total and about 90 species which are found exclusively in the region. Among endemic reptile genera, there are Haackgreerius, Haemodracon, Ditypophis, Pachycalamus and Aeluroglena. Half of these genera are uniquely found on Socotra. Unlike reptiles, amphibians are poorly represented in the region.

There are about 100 species of freshwater fish in the Horn of Africa, about 10 of which are endemic. Among the endemic, three cavefishes, Somali blind barb, Phreatichthys andruzzii and Uegitglanis zammaranoi can be found.

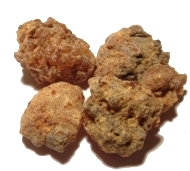
Myrrh, a common resin in the Horn

It is estimated that about 5,000 species of vascular plants are found in the Horn, about half of which are endemic. Endemism is most developed in Socotra and Somaliland. The region has two endemic plant families: the Barbeyaceae and the Dirachmaceae. Among the other remarkable species, there are the cucumber tree found only on Socotra, the Bankoualé palm, the yeheb nut, and the Somali cyclamen.

Due to the Horn of Africa's semi-arid and arid climate, droughts are not uncommon. They are complicated by climate change and changes in agricultural practices. For centuries, the region's pastoral groups have observed careful rangeland management practices to mitigate the effects of drought, such as avoiding overgrazing or setting aside land only for young or ill animals. However, population growth has put pressure on limited land and led to these practices no longer being maintained. Droughts in 1983–85, 1991–92, 1998–99 and 2011 have disrupted periods of gradual growth in herd numbers, leading to a decrease of between 37 and 62 percent of the cattle population. Initiatives by ECHO and USAID have succeeded in reclaiming hundreds of hectares of pastureland through rangeland management, leading to the establishment of the Dikale Rangeland in 2004. 2023 began with the continuation of a severe multiyear drought across the Horn of Africa, affecting over 36 million people. Consecutive failed rainy seasons led to the death of over 13 million livestock in Somalia, Ethiopia and Kenya.

As of 2023, the Horn of Africa is affected by a severe ongoing drought and famine that has been going on for six consecutive years, especially in Somalia and in the months from March to May during which 60 percent of the annual rainfall occurs. It is estimated that the lives of a number of people ranging from 22 to 58 million are at risk.

== Economy ==
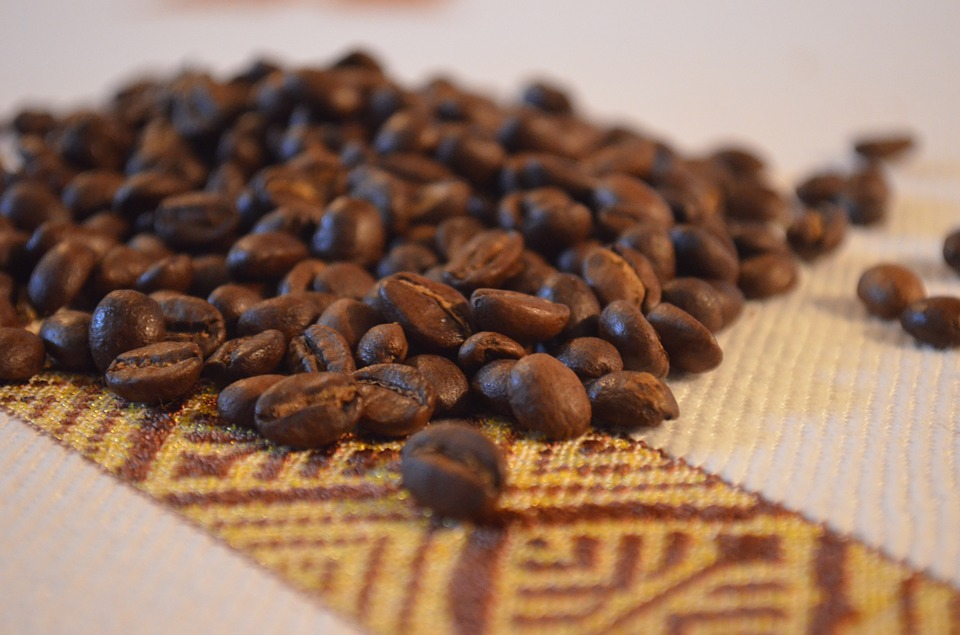
Coffee beans from Ethiopia

According to the IMF, in 2010 the Horn of Africa region had a total GDP (PPP) of $106.224 billion and nominal of $35.819 billion. Per capita, the GDP in 2010 was $1061 (PPP) and $358 (nominal).

Over 95 percent of cross-border trade within the region is unofficial and undocumented, carried out by pastoralists trading livestock. The unofficial trade of live cattle, camels, sheep and goats from Ethiopia sold to other countries in the Horn and the wider Eastern Africa region, including Somalia and Djibouti, generates an estimated total value of between US$250 and US$300 million annually (100 times more than the official figure), with the towns of Burao and Yirowe in Somaliland being home to the largest livestock markets in the Horn of Africa, with as many as 10,000 heads of sheep and goats sold daily from all over the Horn of Africa, many of which are shipped to Gulf states via the port of Berbera. This trade helps lower food prices, increase food security, relieve border tensions and promote regional integration. The unregulated and undocumented nature of this trade runs risks, such as allowing disease to spread across national borders, and governments are unhappy with lost tax revenue and foreign exchange revenues.

== See also ==
- Incense trade route
- List of peninsulas
- Operation Enduring Freedom – Horn of Africa
- Silk Road
- Sub-Saharan Africa
- African Great Lakes Region

== Sources ==
This article incorporates text from a free content work. Licensed under CC BY 4.0 (license statement/permission). Text taken from The Impact of Disasters on Agriculture and Food Security 2025, The Food and Agriculture Organization of the United Nations.

== Sources ==
- Beshah, Girma; Aregay, Merid Wolde (1964). The Question of the Union of the Churches in Luso-Ethiopian Relations (1500–1632). Lisbon: Junta de Investigações do Ultramar and Centro de Estudos Históricos Ultramarinos.
- Cana, Frank Richardson (1911). "Somaliland" . Encyclopædia Britannica. Vol. 25 (11th ed.). pp. 378–384.
- Negash, Tekeste (2005). Eritrea and Ethiopia: the Federal Experience. Uppsala, Sweden: Nordiska Afrikainstitutet. Archived from the original on 22 May 2024.
- Shillington, Kevin (2005). Encyclopedia of African History. CRC Press.
