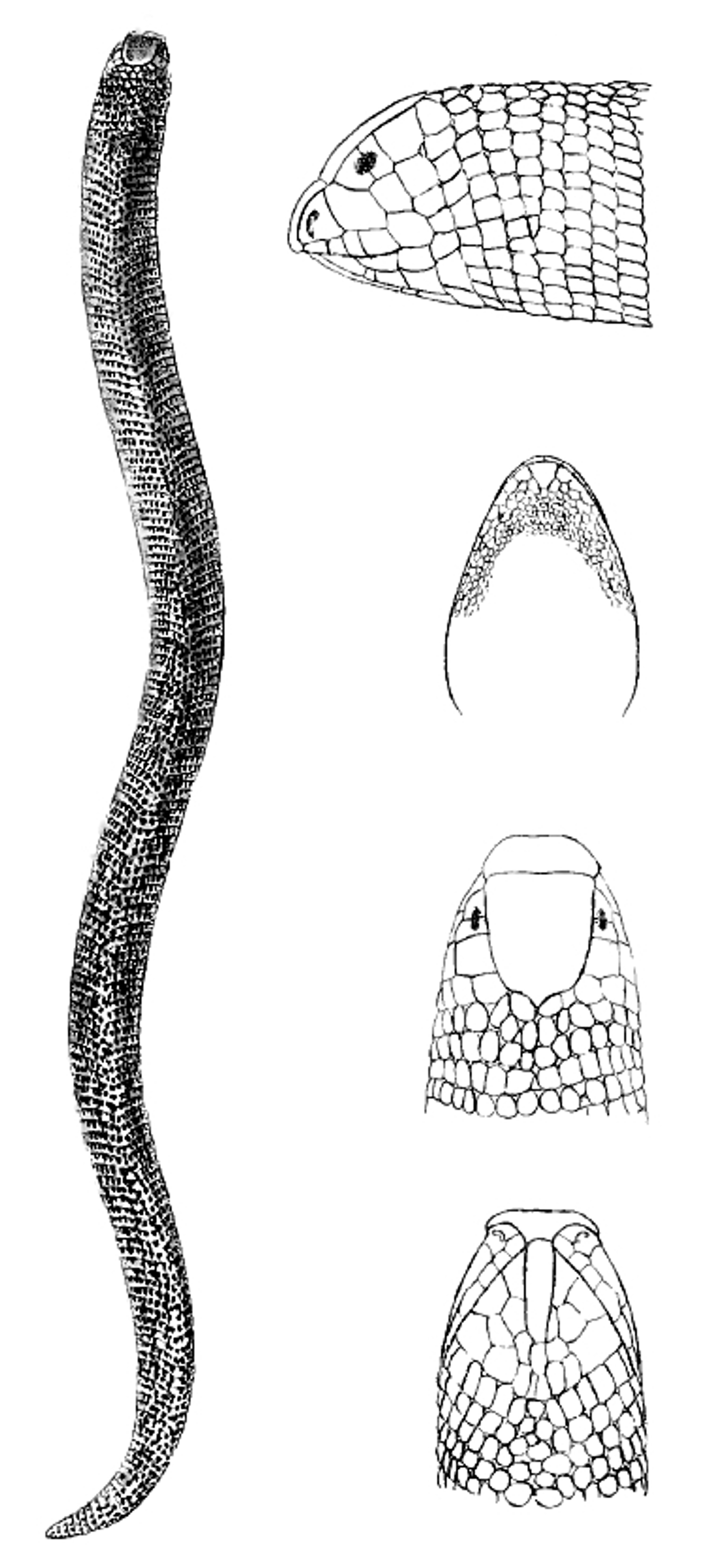
- Sketch of the Arabian worm lizard

Conservation status
- Data Deficient (IUCN 3.1)

Scientific classification
- Domain: Eukaryota
- Kingdom: Animalia
- Phylum: Chordata
- Class: Reptilia
- Order: Squamata
- Clade: Amphisbaenia
- Family: Trogonophidae
- Genus: Agamodon
- Species: A. arabicus

Binomial name
- Agamodon arabicus Andersson, 1901

= Arabian worm lizard =

Species of lizard

The Arabian worm lizard (Agamodon arabicus) is a species of reptiles in the family Trogonophidae. It is found in the southern part of the Arabian Peninsula in Yemen. The population is unknown as it has only been recorded in the past 100 years. The threats are also unknown but does not seem to be threatened by Yemen's small-scale agriculture. Not much is known about this species hence the data deficient status.
