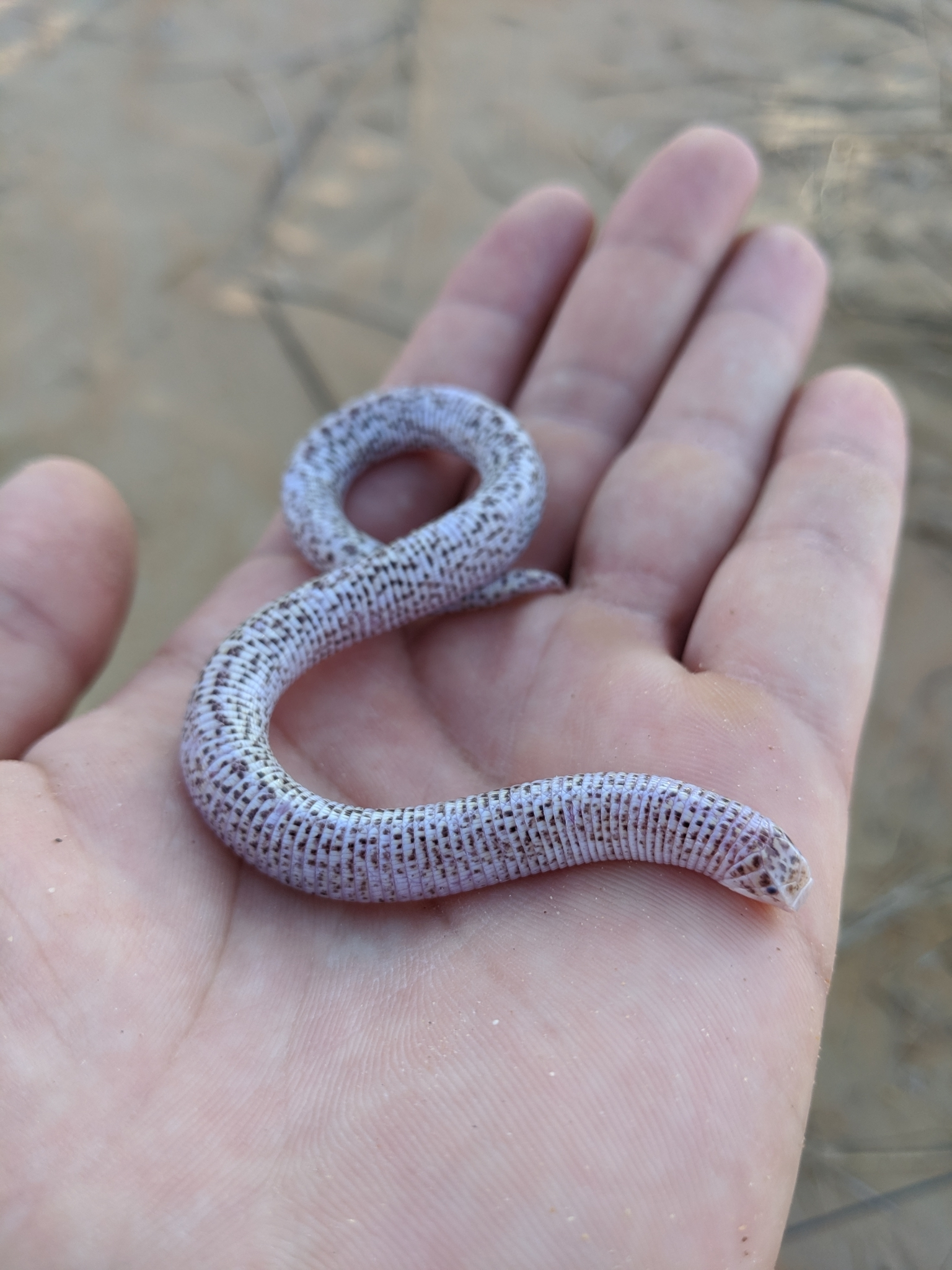

Conservation status
- Least Concern (IUCN 3.1)

Scientific classification
- Kingdom: Animalia
- Phylum: Chordata
- Class: Reptilia
- Order: Squamata
- Clade: Amphisbaenia
- Family: Trogonophidae
- Genus: Diplometopon; Nikolsky, 1907
- Species: D. zarudnyi

Binomial name
- Diplometopon zarudnyi Nikolsky, 1907

Synonyms
- Diplometopon zarudnyi Nikolsky, 1907; Pachycalamus zarudnyi — Boulenger, 1920; Diplometopon zarudnyi — Haas, 1957; Diplometopon shueaibi Niazi, 1979; Diplometopon zarudnyi — Gans, 2005

= Zarudny's worm lizard =

Species of amphisbaenian

Zarudny's worm lizard (Diplometopon zarudnyi) is a species of amphisbaenian reptile in the family Trogonophidae. The species is monotypic within the genus Diplometopon. The species is native to the Middle East.

== Etymology ==
The specific name, zarudnyi, is in honor of Russian zoologist Nikolai Zarudny.

== Geographic range ==
D. zarudnyi is found in western Iran, southern Iraq, and on the Arabian Peninsula in Kuwait, Oman, Qatar, northern Saudi Arabia, and the United Arab Emirates.

== Habitat ==
The preferred natural habitats of D. zarudnyi are desert, grassland, and shrubland, at altitudes from sea level to 1,000 m (3,300 ft).

== Description ==
D. zarudnyi typically measures approximately 30 cm (12 in) in total length (including tail). Because it has no limbs, it uses body undulations similar to a snake to move itself along. It has limited vision.

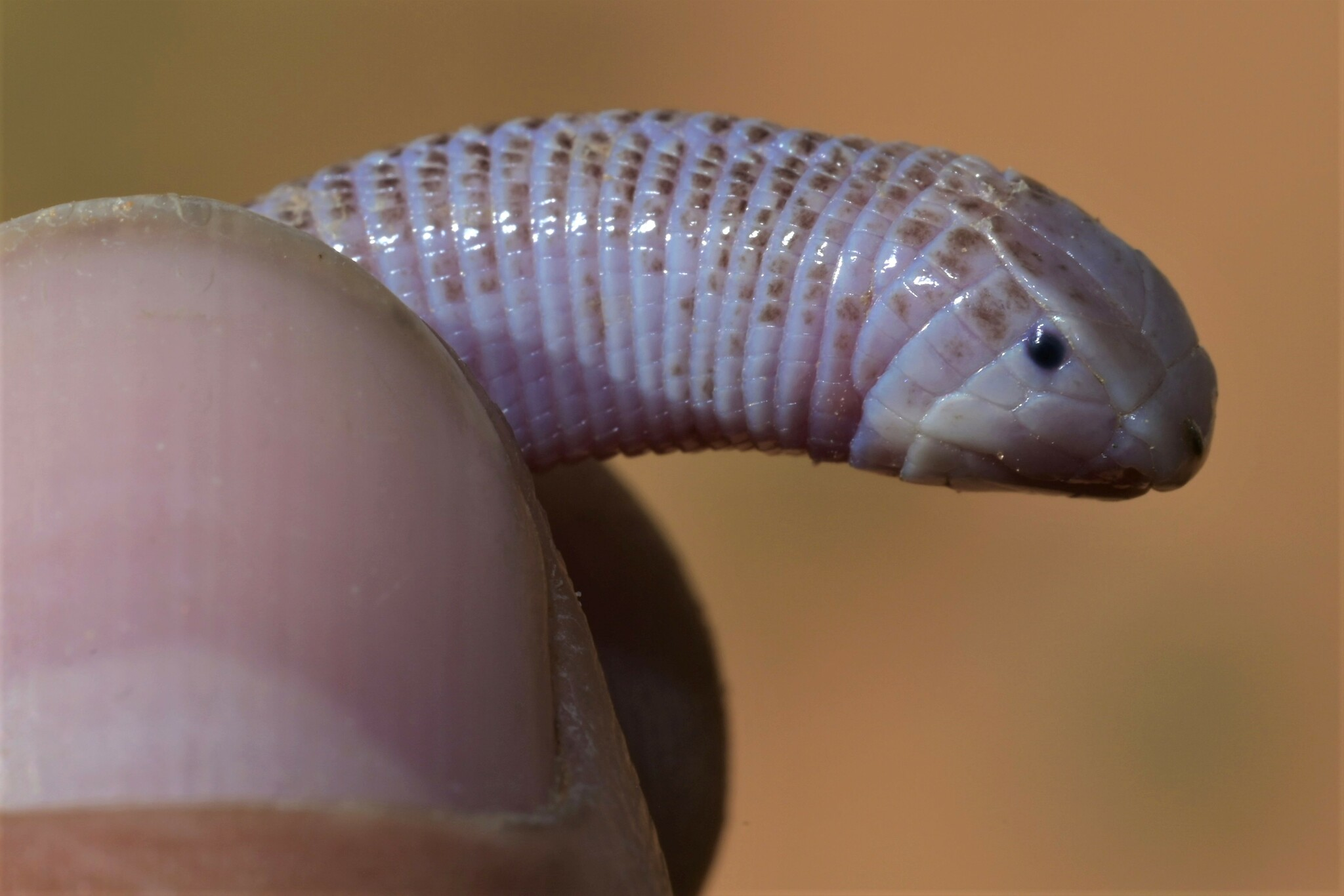
In Saudi Arabia

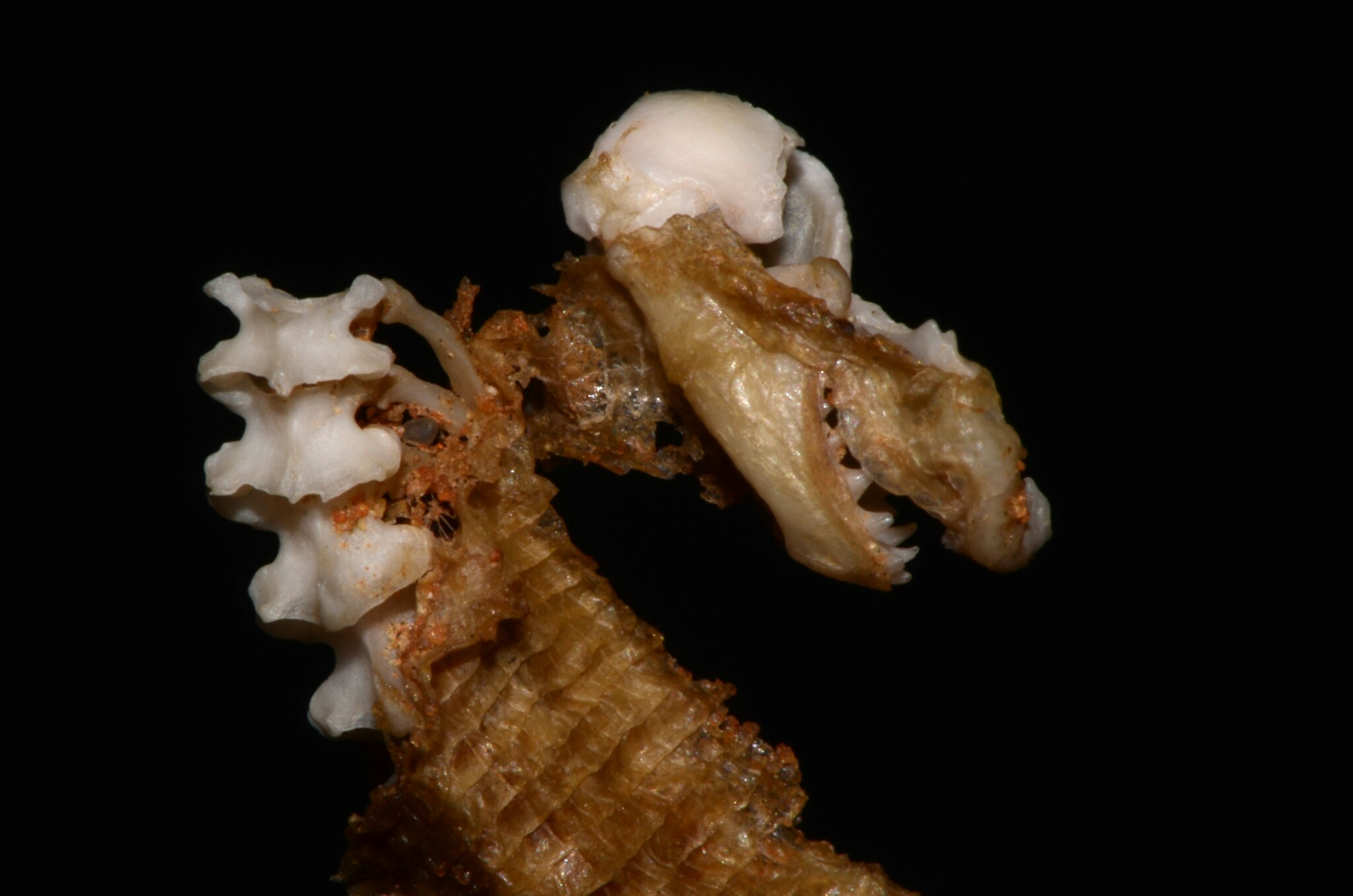
Skull

== Behavior ==
D. zarudnyi is terrestrial and fossorial, burrowing in sand or loose soil.

== Diet ==
The diet of D. zarudnyi consists of insects (mainly larvae and adults of beetles of the genus Dermestes), and other small invertebrates.

== Reproduction ==
D. zarudnyi is oviparous.

== Conservation status ==
D. zarudnyi is classified as Least Concern (LC) in the IUCN Red List.
