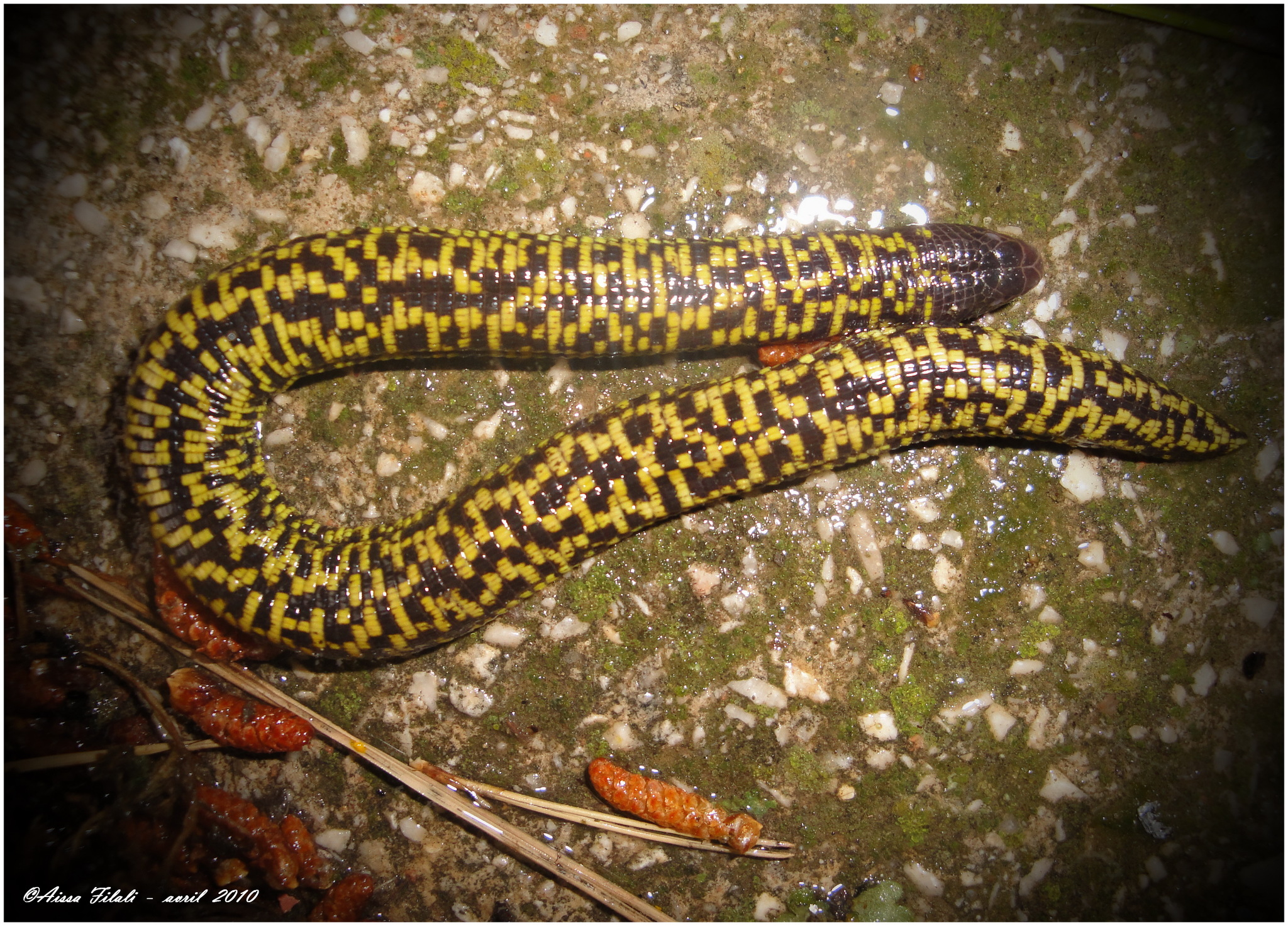

Conservation status
- Least Concern (IUCN 3.1)

Scientific classification
- Kingdom: Animalia
- Phylum: Chordata
- Class: Reptilia
- Order: Squamata
- Clade: Amphisbaenia
- Family: Trogonophidae
- Genus: Trogonophis; Kaup, 1830
- Species: T. wiegmanni

Binomial name
- Trogonophis wiegmanni Kaup, 1830
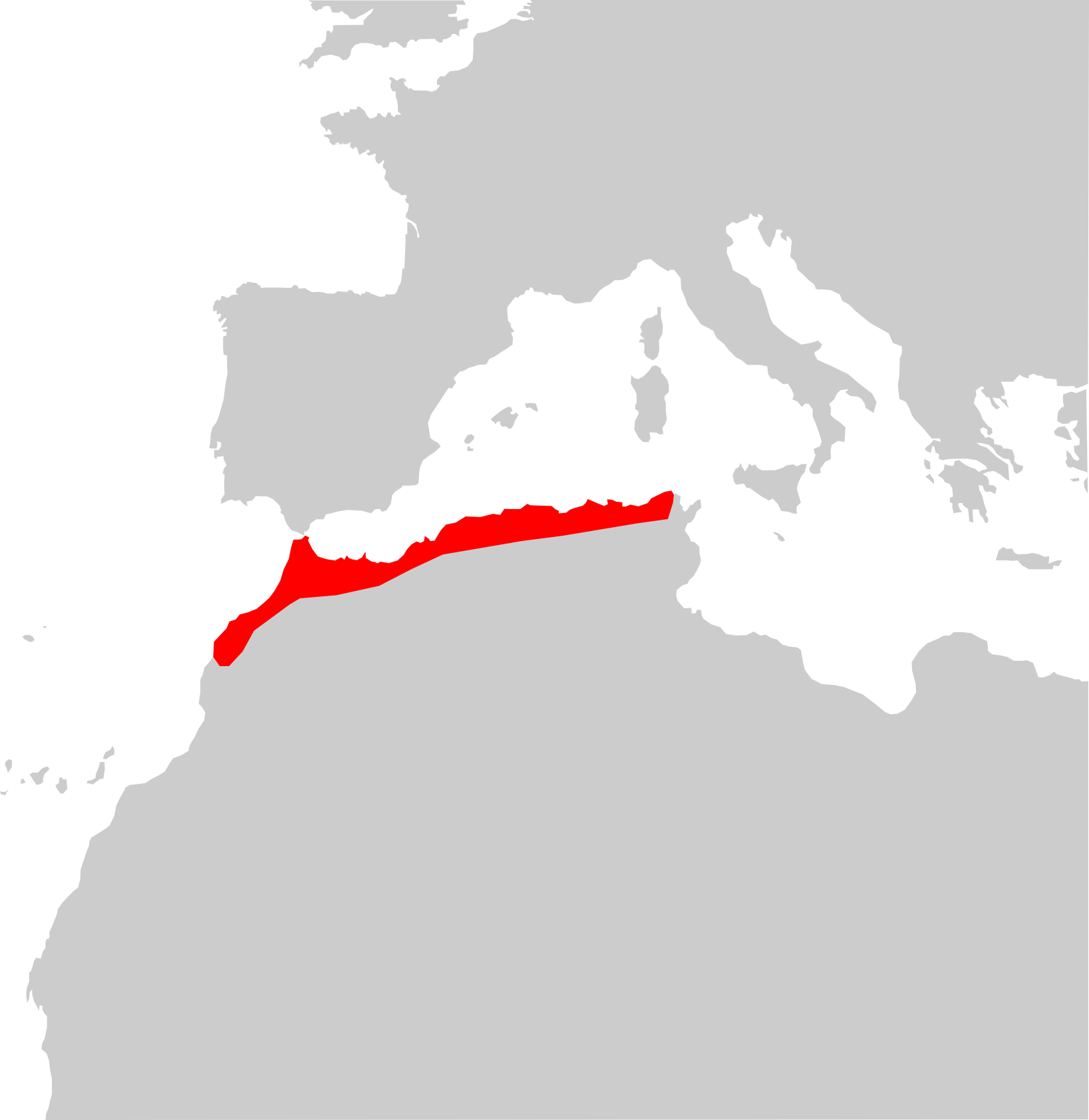

= Checkerboard worm lizard =

Species of amphisbaenian

The checkerboard worm lizard (Trogonophis wiegmanni) is a species of amphisbaenian in the family Trogonophidae. This is only extant species within the genus Trogonophis, and is endemic to North Africa. Its natural habitats are temperate forests, Mediterranean-type shrubby vegetation, temperate grassland, sandy shores, arable land, and pastureland. It is threatened by habitat loss.

== Subspecies ==
There are two subspecies, which can be distinguished by their coloration. The nominotypical subspecies, Trogonophis w. wiegmanni Kaup, 1830, has a pale yellow ground color, while T. w. elegans (Gervais, 1835) has a gray-white or light pink ground color.

== Description ==
Both subspecies of T. wiegmanni exhibit the following characteristics. The head is rounded and slightly compressed dorso-ventrally. The snout is slightly protruding. Two pairs of cephalic shields are present. The nostrils open forward. External ears are absent. The skull is elongate compared to other Trogonophidae.

The body is wormlike: legless, elongate, cylindrical, and annulated. There are sunken lateral lines. The short conical tail lacks autotomy. The body is short and stout relative to other legless lizards. Both sexes lack pre-anal pores.

== Habitat ==
T. wiegmanni can found in areas with abundant leaf litter, sandy soil and moist soil that is covered with stones and other ground cover. It can also be found near roadsides, in traditionally cultivated areas, in oak forest and oak-juniper forests, in sandy patches with no vegetation and in steppe habitat.

T. wiegmanni has a tolerance for a broad range of habitats such as; temperate forest, shrubland, temperate grassland, artificial/terrestrial arable Land, and artificial/terrestrial pastureland. It has been found at elevations from sea level to 1,900 m (6,200 ft).

== Etymology ==
The specific name, wiegmanni, is in honor of German herpetologist Arend Friedrich August Wiegmann.

== Common names ==
Trogonophis wiegmanni is commonly known in English as "Wiegmann's worm lizard" or the "checkerboard worm lizard", in French as "Trogonophis ", and in German as "Schachbrett-Doppelschleiche " or "Wiegmanns Spitzschwanz Doppelschleiche ".

== Geographic range ==
T. wiegmanni is native to northern Algeria, western Morocco, the Chafarinas Islands of Spain, and northwestern Tunisia.

== Behavior ==
T. wiegmanni can be found mostly under rocks/stones in its specific habitats, sometimes in pairs. Individuals of the same sex in this species are never found together under the same rock indicating intrasexual intolerance. Females benefit from male presence through enhanced vigilance or reduced harassment by other males within this species.

== Diet ==
Trogonophis wiegmanni consumes a variety of insects and other soil invertebrates.

== Reproduction ==
T. wiegmanni is viviparous.
