= Terastiodontosaurus =

Terastiodontosaurus Temporal range: Lutetian

Scientific classification
- Kingdom: Animalia
- Phylum: Chordata
- Class: Reptilia
- Order: Squamata
- Clade: Amphisbaenia
- Family: Trogonophidae
- Genus: †Terastiodontosaurus; Georgalis et al., 2024
- Species: †T. marcelosanchezi

Binomial name
- †Terastiodontosaurus marcelosanchezi Georgalis et al., 2024

Extinct genus of trogonophid worm lizard

Terastiodontosaurus is an extinct genus of trogonophid worm lizard. Its only known species Terastiodontosaurus marcelosanchezi lived in Tunisia during the Lutetian stage of the Eocene epoch.

== Palaeobiology ==
=== Palaeoecology ===
The extremely thick enamel of Terastiodontosaurus marcelosanchezi indicates that its teeth were capable of withstanding very high stresses, likely indicating that T. marcelosanchezi was durophagous and could crush and consume a wide variety of snails.
