= Uegitglanis zammaranoi =

Conservation status
- Vulnerable (IUCN 3.1)

Scientific classification
- Kingdom: Animalia
- Phylum: Chordata
- Class: Actinopterygii
- Division: Teleostei
- Order: Siluriformes
- Family: Clariidae
- Genus: Uegitglanis; Gianferrari, 1923
- Species: U. zammaranoi

Binomial name
- Uegitglanis zammaranoi Gianferrari, 1923
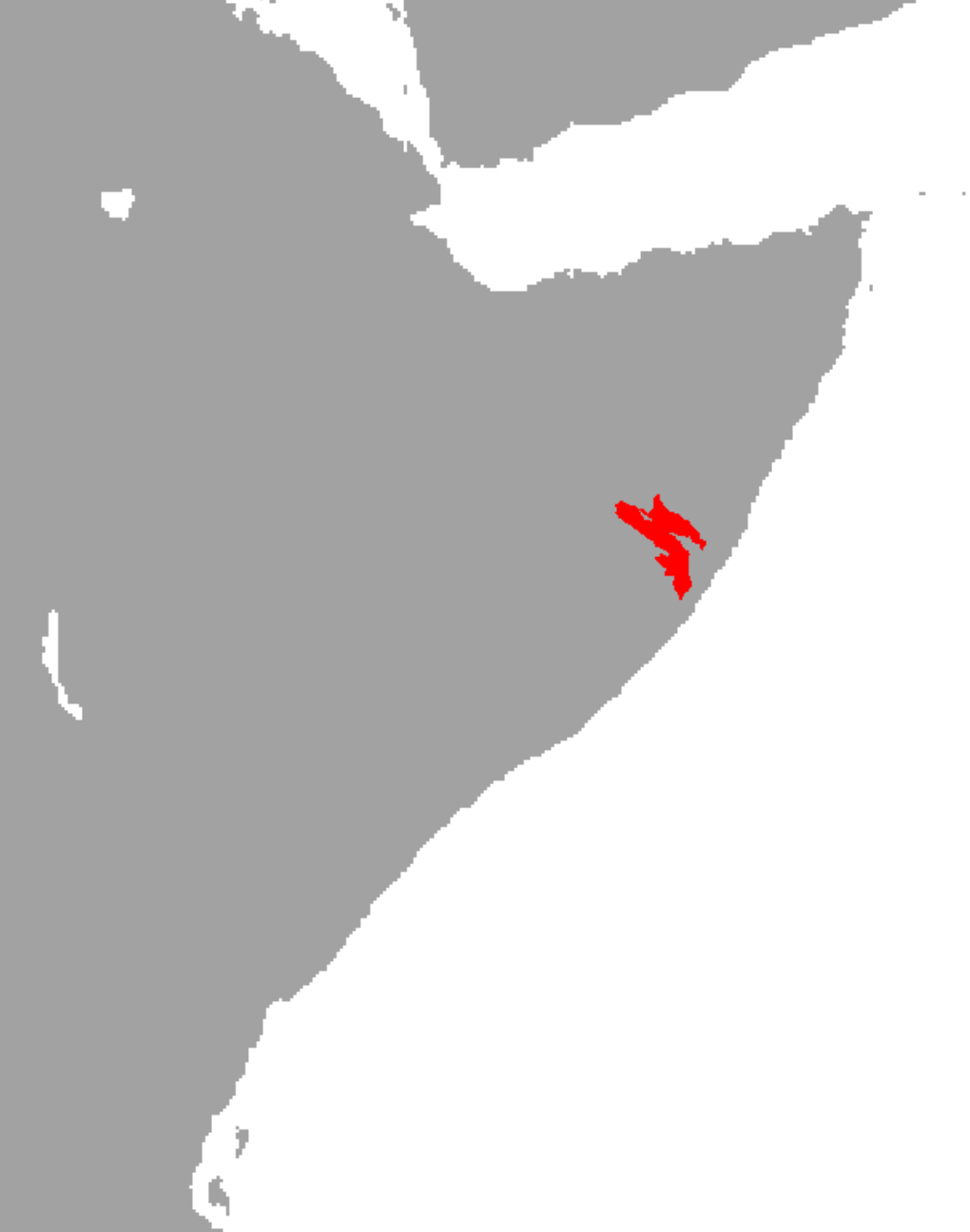

Species of fish

Uegitglanis zammaranoi is the only species of catfish (order Siluriformes) in the genus Uegitglanis of the family Clariidae. It is endemic to Somalia, where it only occurs in caves near the Jubba and Shebelle Rivers. This species grows to about 10.1 cm (4.0 in) in total length.

Like many other cave adapted fishes, Uegitglanis lacks eyes entirely. It also possesses a range of other unique traits among African clariids, including an unencapsulated swim bladder and a reduced cranial laterosensory canal system. These traits are shared by the similarly troglobitic clariid genus Horaglanis from Kerala, India. This divergent morphology has led to hypotheses that Uegitglanis is an early branching clariid lineage, distantly related to other African genera. However, recent genomic evidence indicates that it is phylogenetically nested within African clariids.

Two other cavefish species known from Somalia (both Cypriniformes) are Barbopsis devecchi and Phreatichthys andruzzii.
