= Somalian blind barb =

Conservation status
- Data Deficient (IUCN 3.1)

Scientific classification
- Kingdom: Animalia
- Phylum: Chordata
- Class: Actinopterygii
- Order: Cypriniformes
- Family: Cyprinidae
- Genus: Barbopsis di Caporiacco, 1926
- Species: B. devecchii

Binomial name
- Barbopsis devecchii di Caporiacco, 1926

Synonyms
- Barbopsis devecchi Di Caporiacco, 1926; Barbopsis stefaninii Gianferrari, 1930; Eilichthys microphthalmus Pellegrin, 1929

Species of fish

The Somalian blind barb (Barbopsis devecchii) is a ray-finned fish species in the family Cyprinidae. It is the only member of the genus Barbopsis. This troglobitic fish is found only in Somalia.

There are two other cavefish species in Somalia: the cyprinid Phreatichthys andruzzii and the catfish Uegitglanis zammaranoi.
