= Short worm lizard =

Conservation status
- Data Deficient (IUCN 3.1)

Scientific classification
- Kingdom: Animalia
- Phylum: Chordata
- Class: Reptilia
- Order: Squamata
- Clade: Amphisbaenia
- Family: Trogonophidae
- Genus: Pachycalamus; Günther, 1881
- Species: P. brevis

Binomial name
- Pachycalamus brevis Günther, 1881

Species of lizard

The short worm lizard (Pachycalamus brevis) is a species of reptile in the Trogonophidae family. It is monotypic within the genus Pachycalamus. It is found on the island of Socotra.
