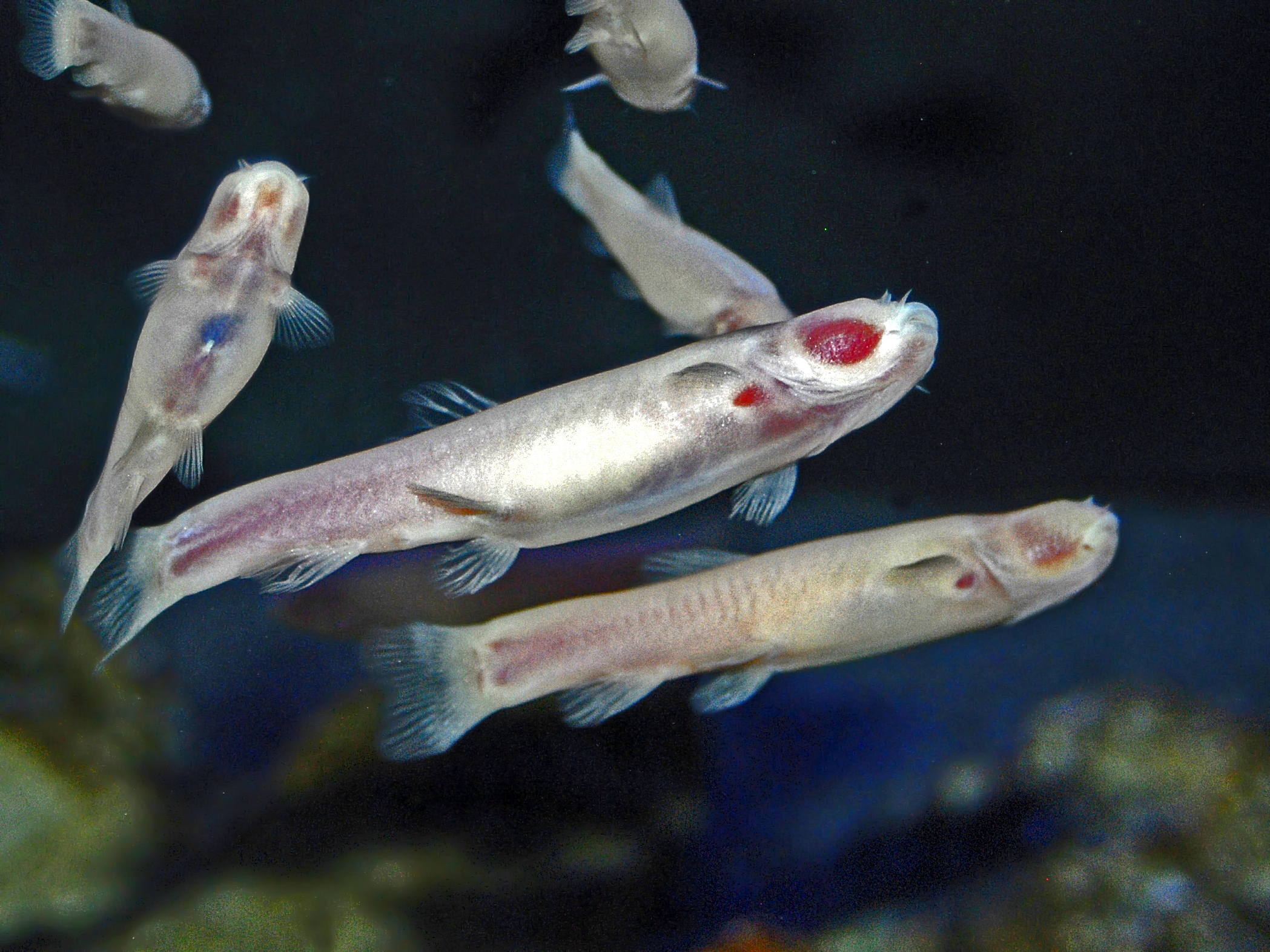

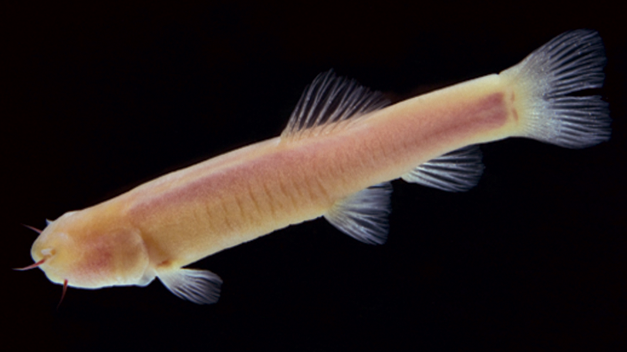

Conservation status
- Vulnerable (IUCN 3.1)

Scientific classification
- Kingdom: Animalia
- Phylum: Chordata
- Class: Actinopterygii
- Order: Cypriniformes
- Family: Cyprinidae
- Genus: Garra
- Species: G. andruzzii

Binomial name
- Garra andruzzii (Vinciguerra, 1924)

Synonyms
- Phreatichthys andruzzii

= Garra andruzzii =

Species of fish

Garra andruzzii, a species of cyprinid fish, formerly the only species of the genus Phreatichthys, and is endemic to Somalia. This cave-adapted fish is whitish (not pigmented) and blind. It has no scales. It is considered to have evolved in the cave environment for some two million years. Its former generic name derives from the Greek words phreasatos for spring, and ichthys for fish. It grows to a maximum length of 6.2 cm (2.4 in).

This fish is the first animal discovered that does not adjust its biological clock with the light of the sun. It has an unusual internal clock, which measures the passage of time with an extremely long period (up to 47 hours). It is also completely blind to all light stimuli.

Two other cavefish species are found in Somalia: the cyprinid Barbopsis devecchi and the catfish Uegitglanis zammaranoi.
