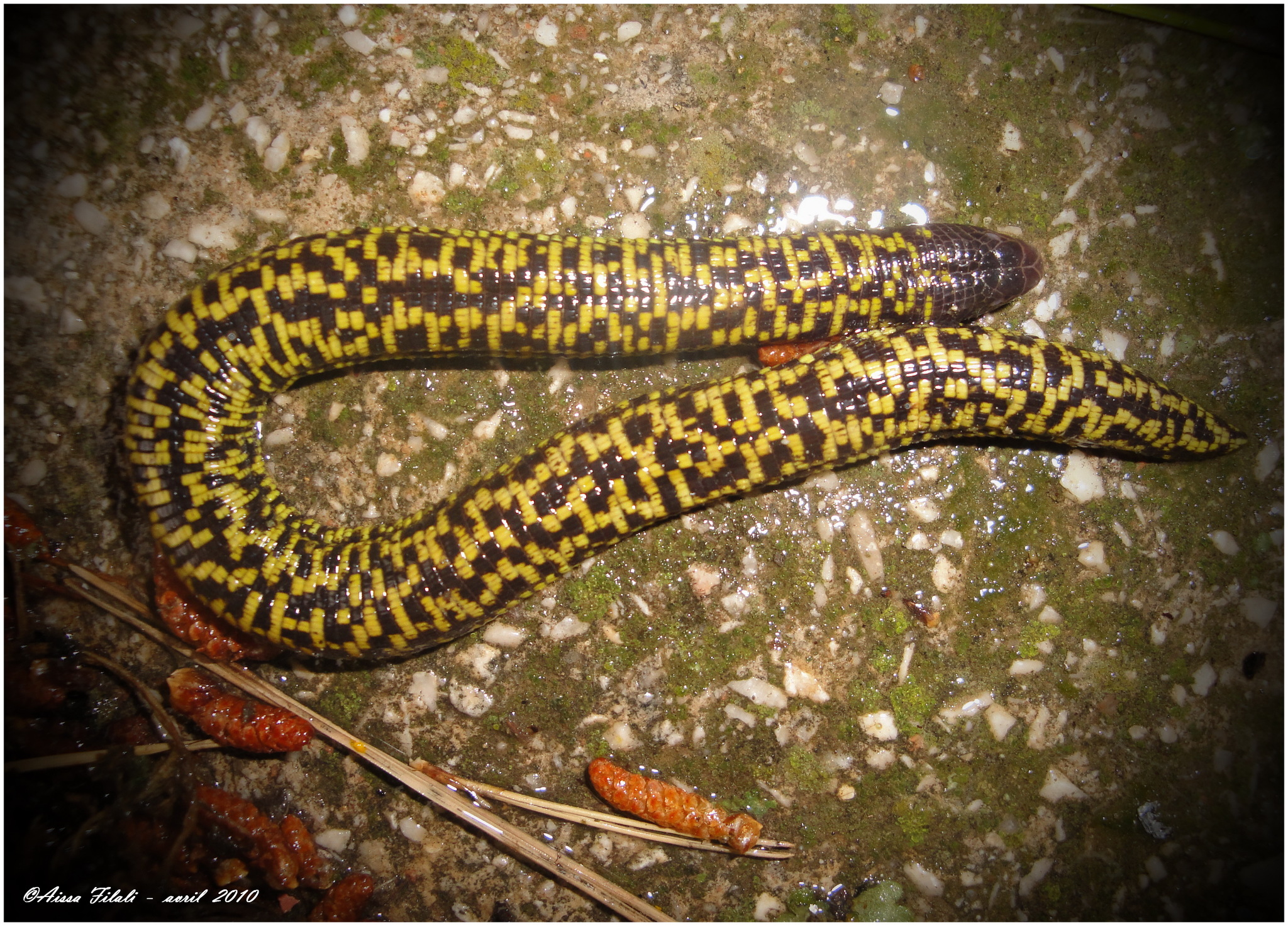
- Trogonophis wiegmanni

Scientific classification
- Kingdom: Animalia
- Phylum: Chordata
- Order: Squamata
- Clade: Amphisbaenia
- Family: Trogonophidae; Gray, 1865

Genera
- Four, see text.

= Trogonophidae =

Trogonophids Temporal range: Thanetian to present

Family of amphisbaenians

Trogonophidae (Palearctic worm lizards or desert ringed lizards) is a small family of amphisbaenians, containing six species in four genera.

== Geographic range ==
Trogonophids are found in North Africa, the Horn of Africa, the Arabian Peninsula, and western Iran.

== Description ==
Trogonophids are limbless, carnivorous, lizard-like reptiles highly modified for burrowing. They construct their tunnels with an oscillating motion that forces soil into the walls. Unlike other amphisbaenians, their teeth are fused to their jaws, rather than lying in a groove.

== Genera ==
The following four genera are recognized as being valid.

- Agamodon W. Peters, 1882 (three species)
- Diplometopon Nikolskii, 1907 (monotypic)
- Pachycalamus Günther, 1881 (monotypic)
- Trogonophis Kaup, 1830 (monotypic)

The following fossil taxa are also known:

- Palaeoblanus Schleich, 1988
- Terastiodontosaurus Georgalis et al, 2024
- Todrasaurus Augé & Rage, 2006

Terastiodontosaurus from the Early or Middle Eocene of Tunisia is the largest known worm lizard to have ever existed, with an estimated total length of nearly 90 centimetres (35 in). Todrasaurus from the Late Paleocene of Morocco is the earliest known species.
