= Hava Hornung =

Israeli oceanographer

Hava Wienograd Len Hornung (Hebrew: חוה הורנונג; December 25, 1929 – December 29, 2012) was Israel's first female oceanographer and instrumental in the establishment of the first oceanographic research station in Israel, the Sea Fisheries Research Station, or "Tahanah le-heker ha-dayig hayami". She was one of the catalysts for oceanographic research in Israel, which eventually culminated in larger Israel Oceanographic and Limnological Research Center (IOLR) in 1967, which continues to do cutting-edge research to this day.

== Early life ==
Hava was born on December 25, 1929, in the town of Świerże in Eastern Poland to Yerachmiel Len and Esther Wienograd Len. In early 1940, after the Soviet invasion of Poland and the fall of the Second Polish Republic, Yerachmiel was arrested on charges of political dissent and deported to a gulag in Siberia with the rest of his family. After a year in the gulag, Hava and her family were sent to work on a kolkhoz in order to help feed the proliferous ranks of the Soviet Army.

Between 1942 and 1944 the family managed to emigrate to Osh, Kyrgyzstan, where Hava completed secondary school in 1946. Only 17 years old, she and her family left Osh and snuck into the U.S.-occupied portion of divided Berlin, after which she began her education at the Humboldt University of Berlin, where she studied analytical chemistry. After graduating in 1949, Hava boarded a ship and sailed across the Mediterranean to reach the newly established state of Israel.

== Israel and oceanography ==
Hava worked as an oceanographer in Israel for about 50 years. After arriving to the port of Haifa shortly after the end of the 1948 Arab-Israeli War and the establishment of the state of Israel, she was immediately recruited by the head of the "Sea Fisheries Research Station" "Hatachana Lecheker Hadaig" ("התחנה לחקר הדיג") in Haifa. The Station had been established in 1946 by German Jewish biologist and zoologist Walter Steinitz, and had only recently received support from the newly formed Israeli Ministry of Agriculture to begin studying the Mediterranean coast. In 1972, after almost 15 years of service, Hava and other members of the "Sea Fisheries Research Station" were given the option of continuing to work as civil servants for the Ministry of Agriculture or to merge with the private Israel Oceanographic and Limnological Research (IOLR) center. The IOLR had been established by Israeli naval captain Yochai Bin-Nun in 1967, and quickly began to consolidate different branches of oceanographic research in Israel. Hava and her colleagues chose to join IOLR and work in the newly formalized National Institute for Oceanography.

Hava worked at the National Institute for Oceanography in Haifa until 31 December 1994, when she was required by law to retire. However, as she was doing essential research and environmental monitoring, she was re-contracted beginning April 1, 1995 until June 30, 1999. During her time at the "Sea Fisheries Research Station" and, later, in IOLR, Hava published and co-published dozens of papers in marine chemistry and biology.

During her first years working as an oceanographic researcher in Haifa, she met Fred Shraga HaCohen Hornung, an officer in the Israeli Navy who had fought in the 1948 Arab-Israeli War. They married on March 28, 1950. After her official retirement in 1999, she continued to live Haifa with her husband until her death in 2012. She is survived by two children and six grandchildren.

== Legacy and notable publications ==
As the first female oceanographer in the recently founded state of Israel, she pioneered the study of oceanography in the country and helped set the foundations for the 1967 Israel Oceanographic and Limnological Research center (IOLR). In 1993, fellow National Institute of Oceanography researcher Bella S. Galil discovered a new species of crustacean in the Mediterranean basin, named Levantocaris hornungae "for Ms. Hava Hornung, in appreciation of a lifetime of work on the Mediterranean fauna."

Most of Hava's research focused on monitoring the levels of heavy metals, particularly mercury, in the ocean and in marine creatures in the Mediterranean Sea along the Israeli coast. In the late 1970s, she and Otto Oren measured high concentrations of mercury in fish from Haifa Bay, and sent the data to the Israeli Environmental Protection service, which was a branch of the Ministry of the Interior. Following this discovery, the government granted the IOLR $30,000 per year as part of the MEDPOL program for the monitoring of heavy metals along the Israeli Mediterranean coastline. Later in her career, she volunteered to conduct research on beached dolphins and other marine mammals in concordance with the Israeli Marine Mammal Research and Assistance Center (IMMRA), founded in 1994.

Aside from her seminal contributions to the findings that came as a result of the United Nations Mediterranean Action Plan, she also authored and co-authored numerous research papers on oceanography in various journals, including the Marine Pollution Bulletin, Helgoland Marine Research, Toxicological & Environmental Chemistry, and Estuarine, Coastal and Shelf Science, among others.
