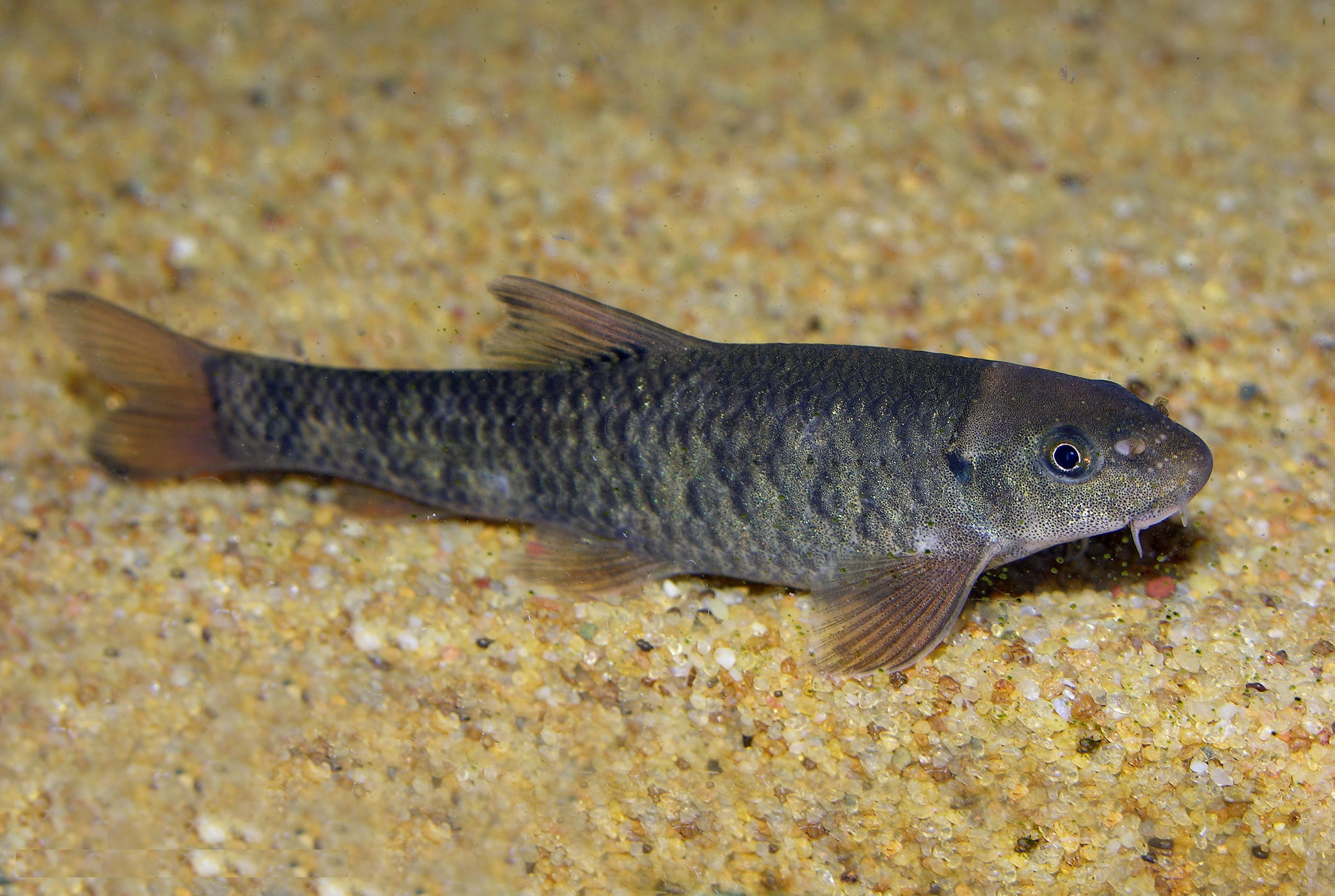

Conservation status
- Least Concern (IUCN 3.1)

Scientific classification
- Kingdom: Animalia
- Phylum: Chordata
- Class: Actinopterygii
- Division: Teleostei
- Order: Cypriniformes
- Family: Cyprinidae
- Subfamily: Labeoninae
- Genus: Garra
- Species: G. rufa

Binomial name
- Garra rufa (Heckel, 1843)

Synonyms
- Discognathus crenulatus Heckel 1846–49; Discognathus lamta non Hamilton 1822; Discognathus obtusus Heckel 1843; Discognathus rufus Heckel 1843; Garra lamta non Hamilton 1822; Garra rufa crenulata Heckel 1844

= Red garra =

Species of fish

The red garra (Garra rufa), also known as the doctor fish or nibble fish, is a species of cyprinid native to a wide range of freshwater habitats in subtropical parts of Western Asia. This small fish typically is up to about 14 cm (5.5 in) in total length, but some individuals can reach as much as 24 cm (9.5 in).

In the wild, G. rufa feeds on detritus, algae, and tiny animals (arthropods and other zooplankton).

== Distribution, habitat, and taxonomy ==
As traditionally defined, G. rufa is native to Turkey, Syria, Jordan, Israel-Palestine, Iraq and Iran. Some of the main systems where it is found are the Kızıl, Seyhan, Ceyhan, Orontes, Queiq, Jordan, Tigris–Euphrates, Kor, and Mond River Basins, but the species also inhabits other coastal river basins in the Levant and Iran, as well as the endorheic Lake Maharlu system. It lives in rivers, streams, canals, reservoirs, ponds, and lakes, although it tends to avoid stagnant waters. It often is common or abundant, even in areas that are heavily influenced by humans, such as polluted canals.

The taxonomy of this species has been labelled with uncertainty. As traditionally defined (sensu lato), some morphological variations exist over its relatively large range and it has been recognized for several years that it likely was a species complex. Several subspecies have been described, but their validity is questionable, and in the last few decades, authorities have generally not recognized them. Nevertheless, reviews published since 2014 have provided genetic and morphologic evidence for recognizing some of them as separate species, while other new species have been described from the species complex. This includes G. turcica (formerly a subspecies) from its Turkish range, except the Tigris–Euphrates system, G. jordanica (new species) from the northern Dead Sea basin, including the Jordan River, in Israel, Jordan and Syria, G. gymnothorax (formerly a subspecies) from the Karun, Balarud and Bashar systems in Iran, G. mondica (new species) of the Mond River basin in Iran, and G. amirhosseini (new species) from the Sartang-e-Bijar Spring in the Tigris River system in Iran. G. jordanica and G. turcica have entirely separate ranges from true G. rufa (thus limiting its range to the Tigris–Euphrates system and river systems in Iran), but the others do overlap in range with true G. rufa or at least occur in the same river basins.

Other members of the G. rufa complex are G. barreimiae, G. elegans, G. ghorensis, G. longipinnis, G. nana, G. persica, G. rossica, and G. sahilia, but these were generally recognized as valid species many years ago. Finally the complex includes four cavefish: G. lorestanensis, G. tashanensis, G. typhlops and G. widdowsoni.

== Fish pedicure ==
Using doctor fish as a pedicure treatment remains a controversial subject due to sanitation and animal ethics issues. The practice is banned in several U.S. states and Canadian provinces as cosmetology regulators believe the practice is unsanitary. Reporting done through the Wall Street Journal found that "cosmetology regulations generally mandate that tools need to be discarded or sanitized after each use. But epidermis-eating fish are too expensive to throw away". Not everyone supports this consensus, as at least one report conducted by the UK Health Protection Agency in 2011 assigned a "very low" risk of transferring infection from the procedure. Animal-rights organizations such as PETA denounces the practice, citing callous methods of international transportation and suggesting that the fish are deliberately starved between treatments to force them to eat an abnormal amount of food.

Garra rufa fish seen in the spa and aquarium trade mostly originate from commercial facilities in Israel and to a lesser degree Turkey. Since Israeli and many (but not all) Turkish populations of "G. rufa" now are recognized as G. jordanica and G. turcica instead, this leads to questions over the true identity of most of the fish seen in the trade. It is legally protected from capture from the wild in Turkey due to concerns of overharvesting. Despite its ability to survive in polluted waters, the species requires clean, well-oxygenated, and moving waters to thrive in an aquarium.

When used as a prelude intended to enhance the effects of ultraviolet light exposure in psoriasis treatment, fish pedicure is known as ichthyotherapy.

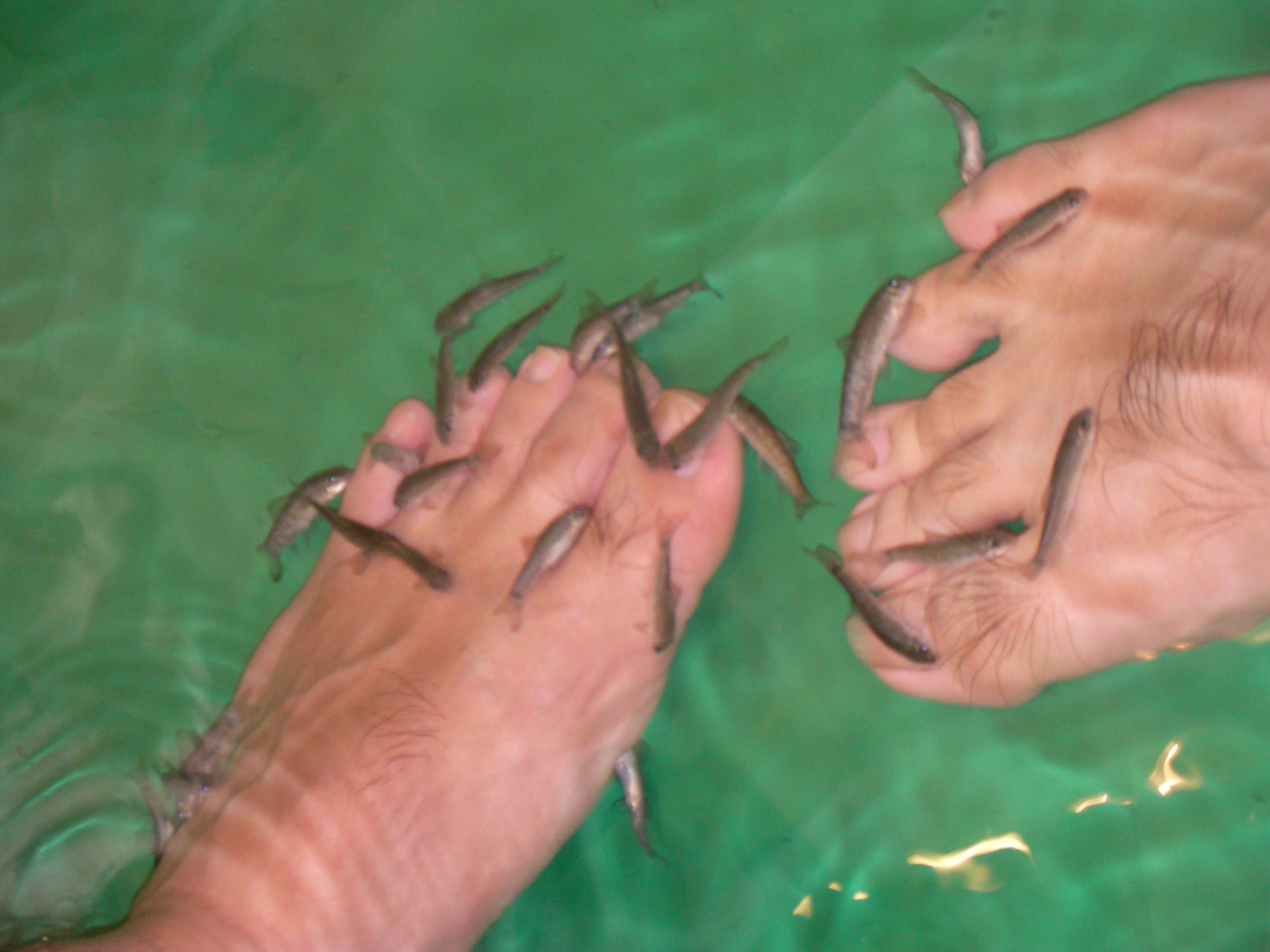
Doctor fish cleaning a bather's feet.

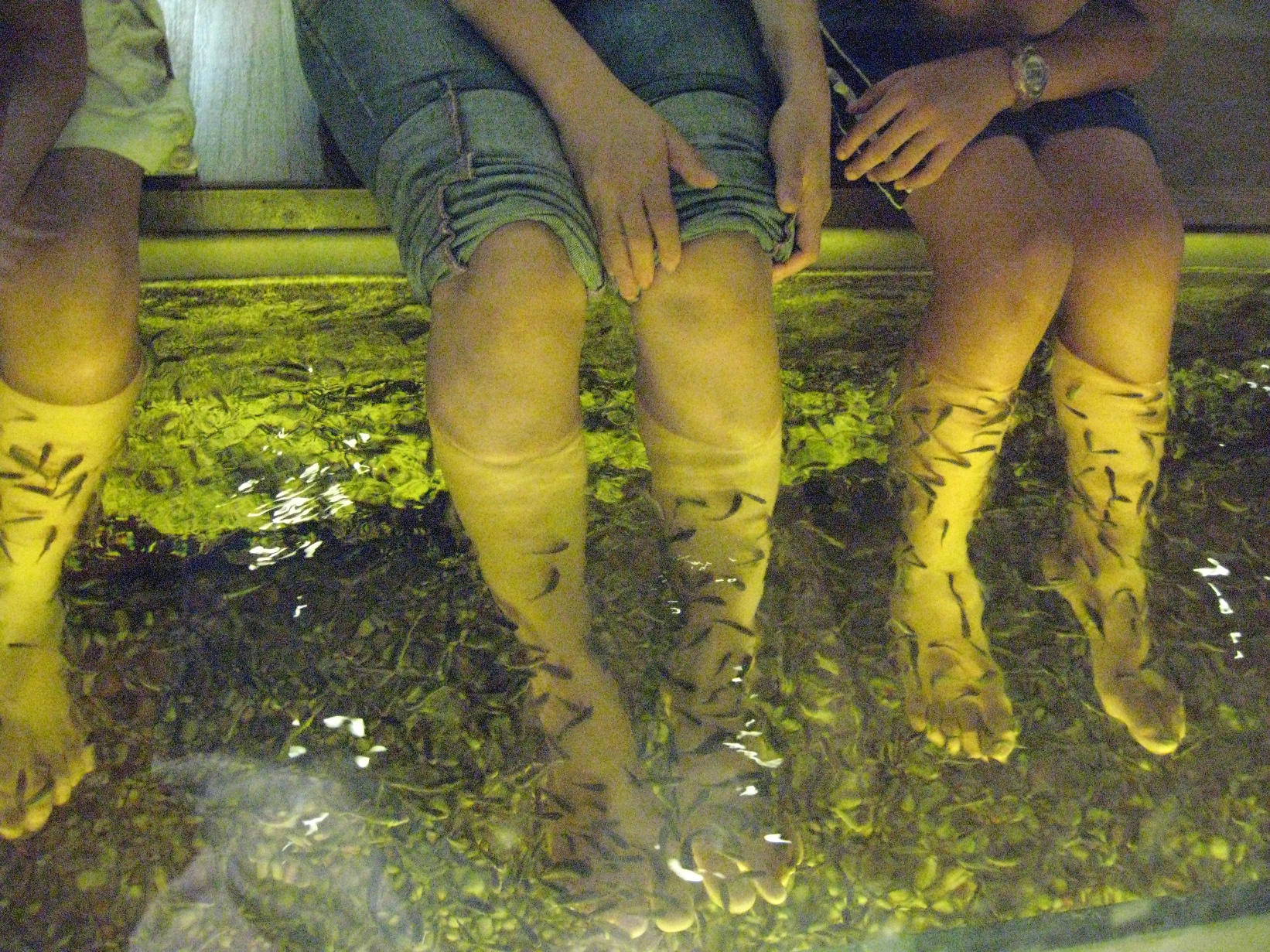
Some spas provide large fish ponds with thousands of doctor fish in them.

Doctor Fish actively feeding

== See also ==
- Cleaner fish
