= Heinz Steinitz =

Israeli marine biologist and herpetologist

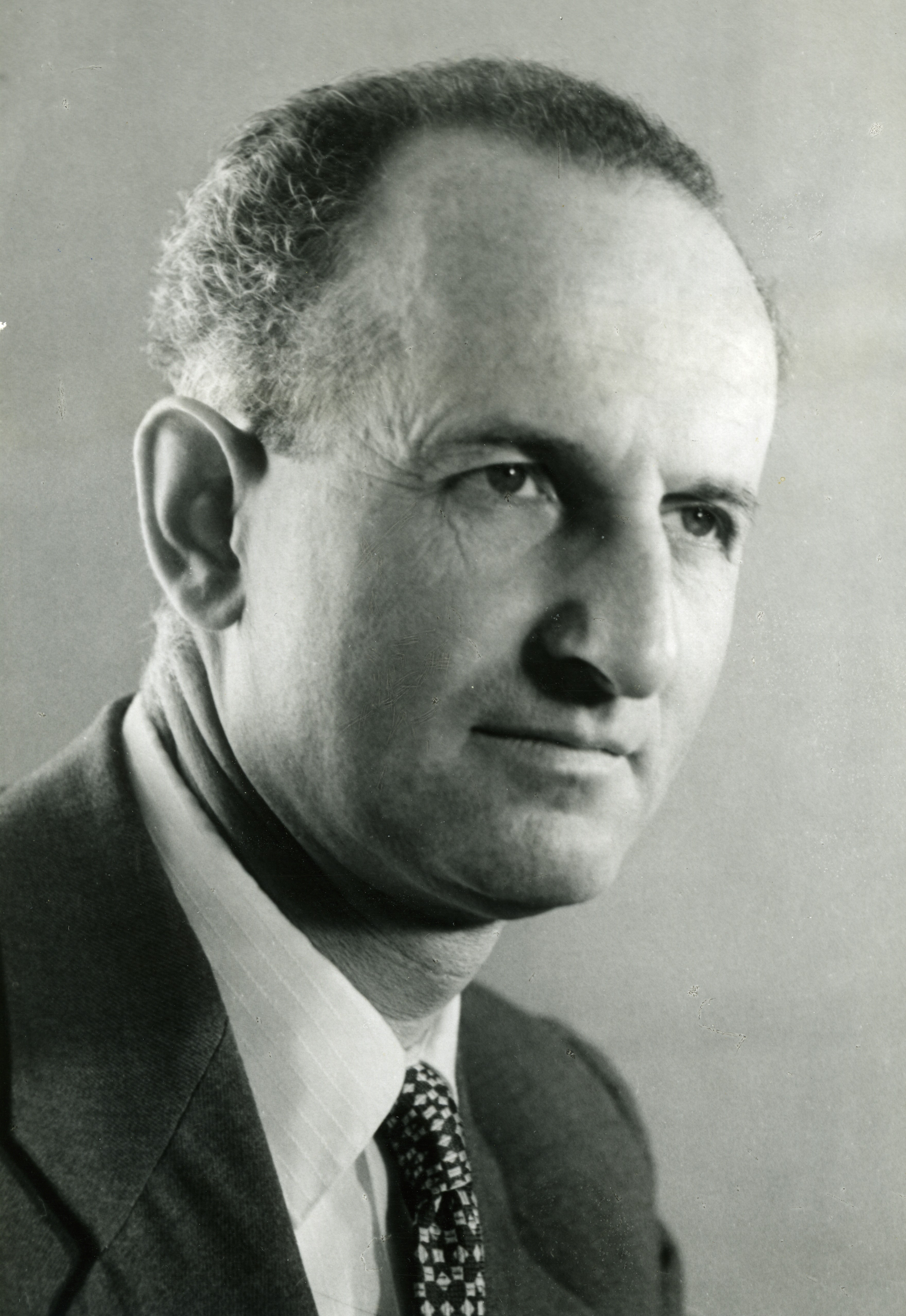
Prof Heinz Steinitz, 1957

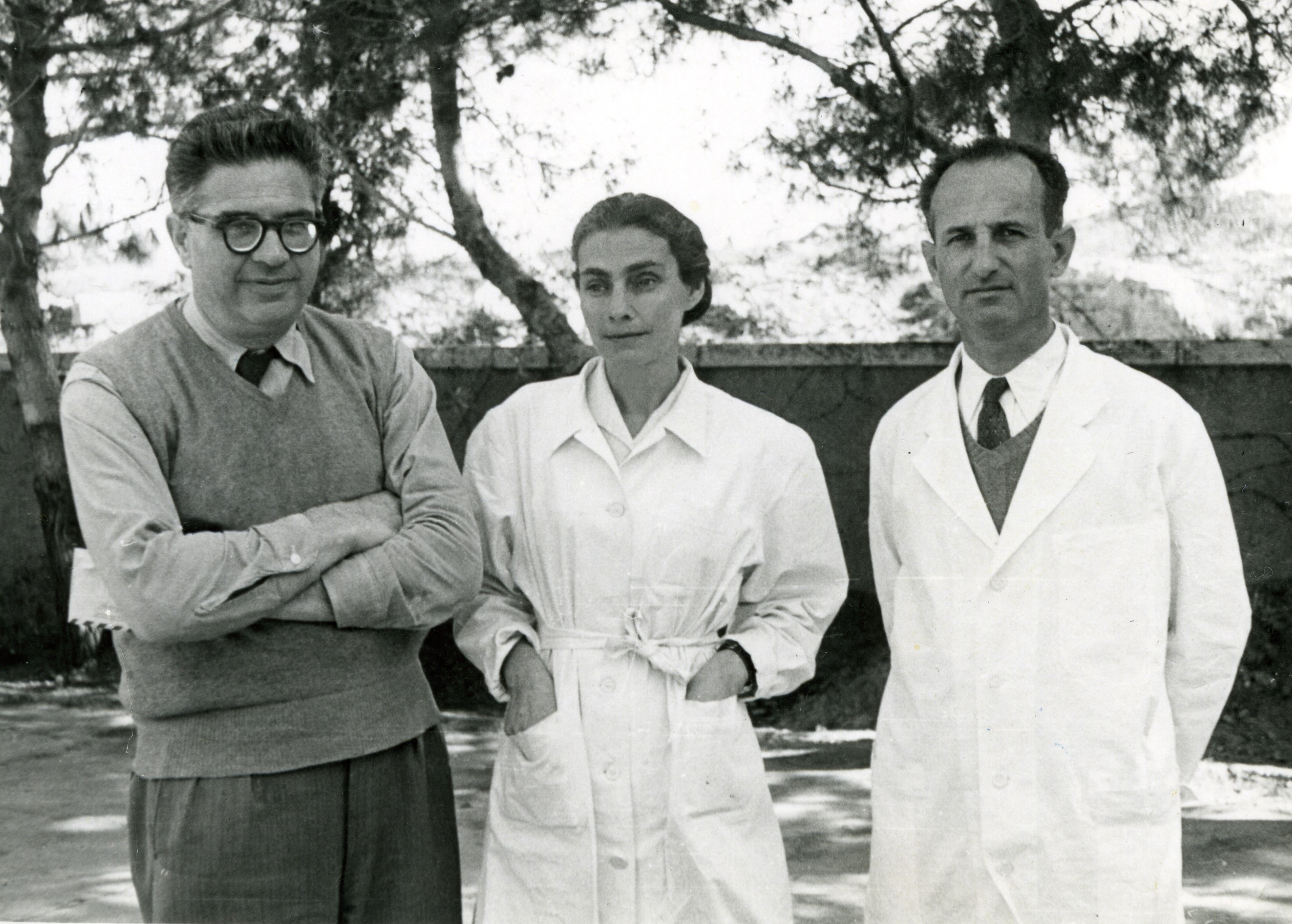
Three professors of the Department of Zoology, The Hebrew University, Jerusalem, 1955. From left to right: Herpetologist and paleontologist Georg Haas, geneticist Elisabeth Goldschmidt and Heinz Steinitz.

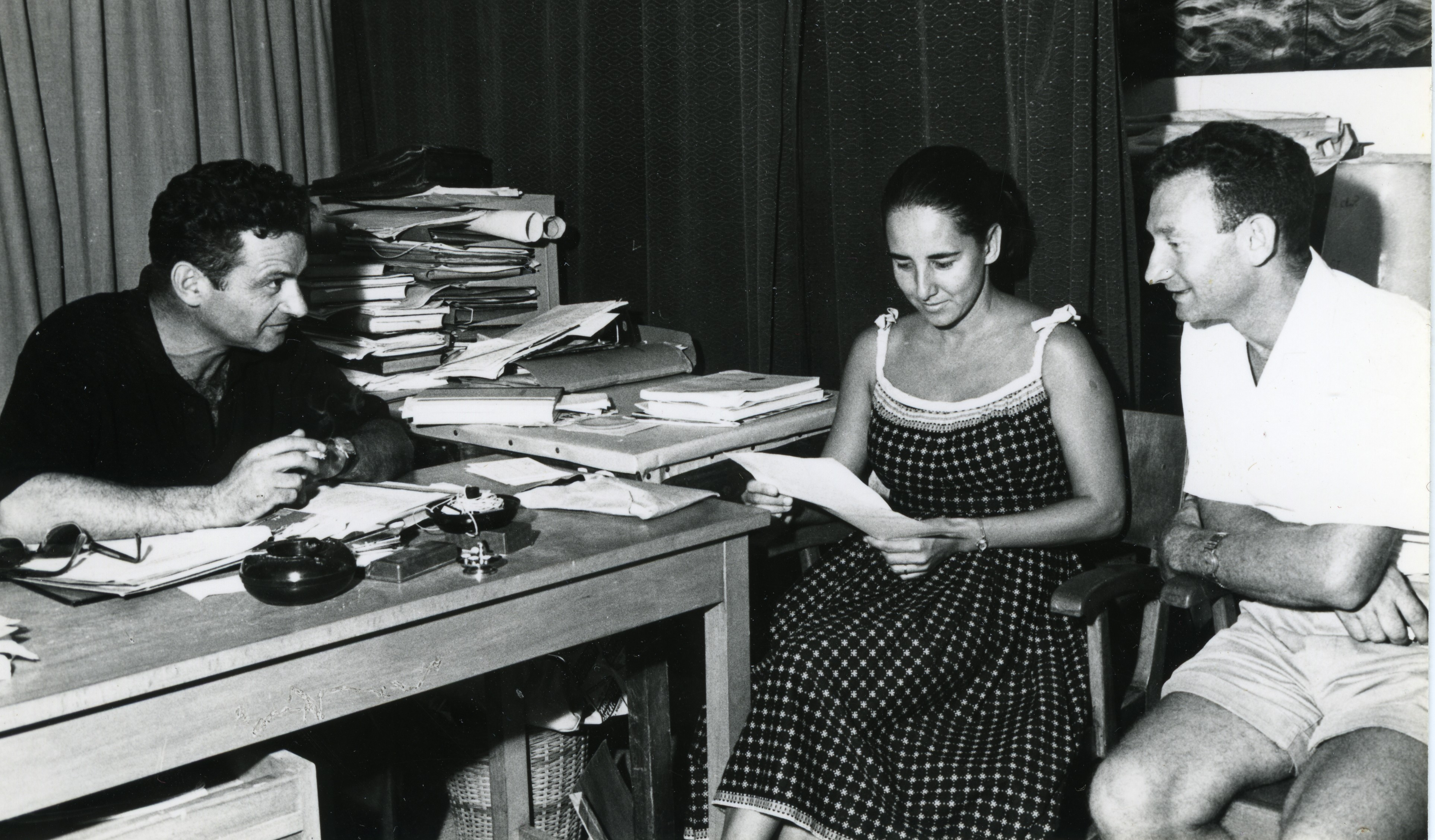
Three colleagues of Heinz Steinitz. From left to right: Dr. Otto H. Oren, Prof. Eugenie Clark, Prof. Adam Ben-Tuvia, 1962

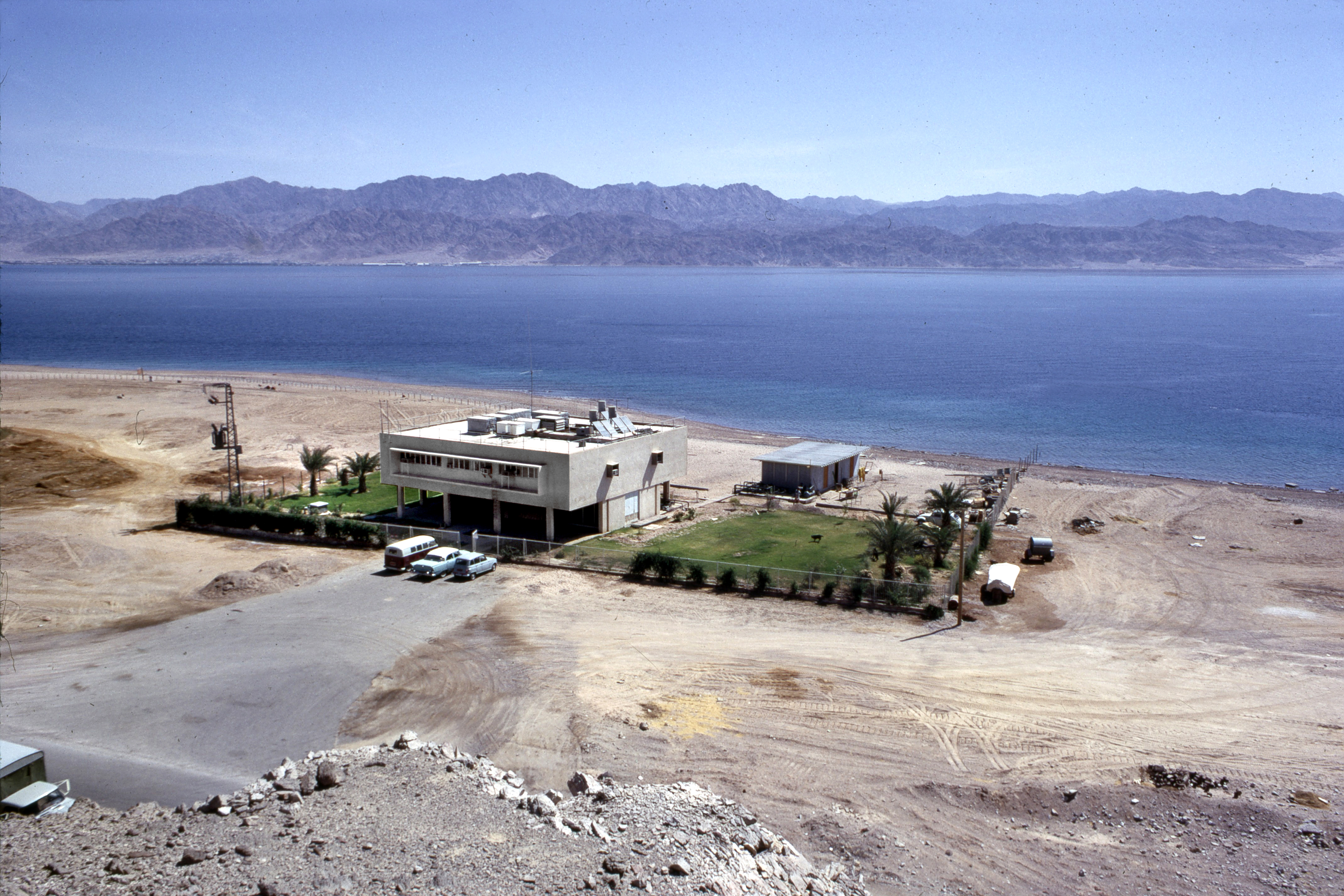
Marine Biology Laboratory near Eilat, 1969. Courtesy of Dr. D. Darom

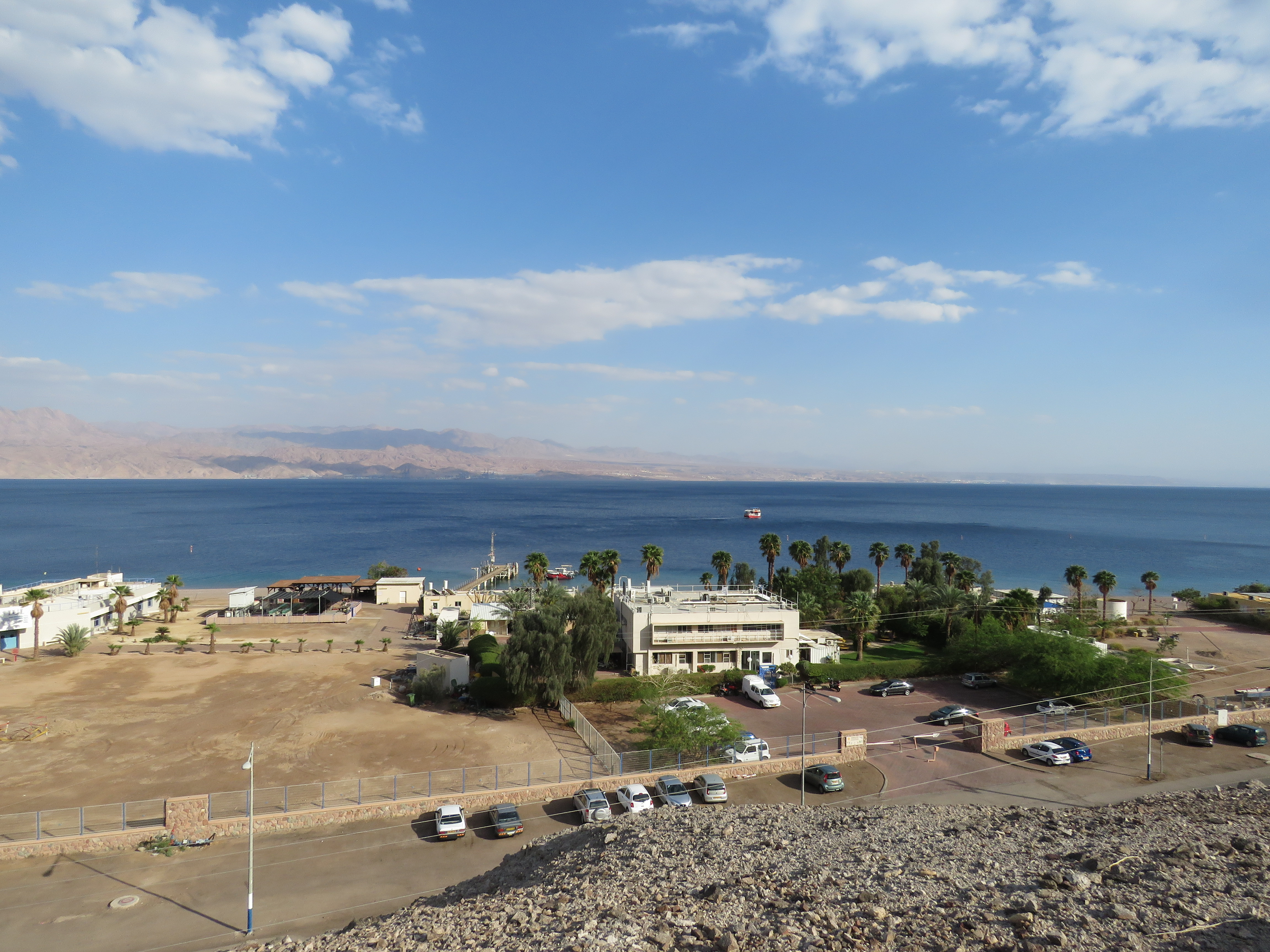
The Interuniversity Institute for Marine Sciences (IUI) near Eilat, 2016. Courtesy of Prof. Amatzia Genin

Heinz Steinitz (Hebrew: היינץ שטייניץ; April 26, 1909 – April 28, 1971) was a senior Israeli marine biologist and herpetologist, Professor and Chairman of the Department of zoology at the Hebrew University in Jerusalem. He laid the foundation for research and teaching in marine biology and oceanography in Israel. In 1968 he founded the Marine Biology Laboratory of the Hebrew University near Eilat, serving as its first director. He also served as a founding member of the Zoological Society of Israel and a co-founder of the Society for the Protection of Nature in Israel.

== Biography ==
Heinz Steinitz was born in Breslau, German Empire (now Wrocław, Poland) on April 26, 1909, to Walter Steinitz (1882–1963), a cardiologist and zoologist, and Marta Schindler Steinitz (1885–1926). He grew up in Breslau and was greatly inspired by his father to study science and to be an active Zionist. He studied medicine from 1927 to 1933 in the universities of Breslau, Freiburg and Berlin. Although he passed the Medical Board examination in 1933, and would have started work in a hospital in Berlin and in the Jewish hospital in Breslau, he was prohibited from practicing by the Nazi regime which came to power that same year. Together with his wife Ruth Aber Steinitz (1907–1995), a medical student as well, he left Germany in 1933 and immigrated to Palestine.

Three sons were born to Heinz Steinitz and Dr. Ruth Steinitz. Each turned to sciences: Raphael Steinitz, an astrophysicist, was a Professor Emeritus at the Department of Physics, Ben-Gurion University of the Negev, Be’er Sheba; Gideon Steinitz, a senior geologist, was the former Head of the Geological Survey of Israel, Jerusalem; and Benjamin Steinitz, a plant scientist retired as a senior research scientist in the fields of plant physiology and horticulture at the Institute of Plant Sciences, Agricultural Research Organization, The Volcani Center, Rishon LeZion.

Heinz Steinitz died suddenly from a stroke on April 28, 1971, while being fully active in all positions he held at that time.

== Academic career ==
Unable to get in 1933 a permit from the British administration in Palestine to practice as a physician, Heinz Steinitz turned to earn his living in an agricultural research station located in Rehovot (and later in Petah Tikva). That work marked the moment he changed his path from medicine to zoology. His research on the control of citrus pests, under the supervision of Prof. F. S. Bodenheimer, eventually became the experimental basis for his doctoral thesis. In 1938, Steinitz was the first to obtain a Ph.D. degree in zoology at the Hebrew University of Jerusalem, and he took his place in the founders and pioneers of zoology in Israel.

He became a member of the teaching and research staff of the Department of Zoology at the Hebrew University of Jerusalem in 1936, advanced along the academic track up to the highest degree of full professor, and worked in the department until his death. The Hebrew University, the first university in Israel, was established only a decade before Steinitz's arrival in Jerusalem; thus, his academic career parallels the early history of zoology research and teaching in the Israeli academia.

In the first decade of his career, including the years of World War II, he acted in the department as a teaching and research assistant, and concurrently, during 1943–1946, he lectured zoology at the Kibbutzim College of Education.

Appointed lecturer in 1946, he instructed animal histology, anatomy of livestock animals and laboratory animals. During the Arab-Israeli War (1948-1949) he served in a preventive healthcare military unit, teaching medical students recruited to army service. As a consequence of that war, the campus of the Hebrew University on Mount Scopus became an enclave in the Jordanian kingdom, disconnected from the western part of a divided Jerusalem. The university relocated its faculties to west Jerusalem. The zoology department, excluded from the new Givat Ram campus constructed in the 1950s, resided in buildings on different sites in the western city. Steinitz was active in reorganizing the department's function under the new circumstances and took care of the zoological collections moved from Mount Scopus to west Jerusalem. His office and labs migrated over the years. At first they were in the Terra Sancta building in Rehavia, then in the St. Antonio Monastery building, across from the official residence of the President of Israel, and finally close to the Russian Compound in the center of west Jerusalem. In 1951 Steinitz went to the US for two years as a research fellow at Yale University School of Medicine in New Haven, Connecticut, where he conducted research in the field of experimental embryology. By 1954 he was promoted to Assistant Professor, became Associate Professor in 1957, and was appointed in 1963 Chairman of Division A of the Department of Zoology in Jerusalem. He lectured in general zoology, vertebrates and invertebrates morphology, animal histology, experimental embryology and ecology. From the mid-1950s onwards, marine biology and marine ecology became core of his research interests. He was the first to teach marine biology, and by 1966 he headed the development of the marine biology curriculum and research programs. In 1968, being Chairman of the Department of Zoology, he was appointed Full Professor.

Steinitz supervised masters and doctoral students, some of whom became senior scientists in fields of biology and environmental sciences in universities, research institutes, colleges and teacher colleges around the country. He believed in the importance of teaching and education at all levels, including preparing students to be school teachers. In this context, in the years 1957-1960 he was board member of the School of Education of the Hebrew University.

== Research on fish, amphibians and the ecology of lakes and seas ==
Heinz Steinitz was an ichthyologist, herpetologist, and marine biologist. He researched the ecology, distribution and evolution of amphibians and fresh water fish in the Middle East; the ecology, distribution and taxonomy of fish in the Red Sea; the ecology of the southeast Mediterranean Sea and the Red Sea. Other research interests included experimental embryology, neurohistology, and anatomical microscopy of the amphibian eye. Geographically, his studies were conducted along the Syrian-African Great Rift valley, from Lake Hula and Lake Kinneret (The Sea of Galilee) in the north of Israel, through the Dead Sea in the center of the country, down to the Gulf of Eilat and the Red Sea in the south. Other parts of his work were carried out in the south east Mediterranean Basin and along the coasts of the Sinai Peninsula. His research concerned taxonomy, anatomy, zoogeographic distribution and ecology of the fauna investigated.

Together with his colleague Dr. Heinrich Mendelssohn, then at the Biological-Pedagogical Institute and later Professor at the Department of Zoology at Tel Aviv University, he explored the fauna of Lake Hula and its surrounding swamps. In 1940, the two researchers discovered the rare Hula painted frog (Latonia nigriventer), the only living member of the genus Latonia, an amphibian endemic to the Hula marshes. Lake Hula and its marshland were drained in the 1950s. The frog, considered to be extinct for about half a century due to the destruction of its habitat, was rediscovered in 2011. It is considered a living fossil, and it is included in the list of endangered species. Steinitz also explored fish species living in the unique ecological niche of Ein Feshkha. This site — the deepest continental point on Earth — is a saline wetland in the desert, on the northwestern shore of the Dead Sea, nourished by a spring of brackish water. Fish in this special habitat evolved isolated from fish populating other habitats.

On a first study of the southeast Mediterranean Basin, published in 1947 jointly with Prof. Georg Haas, they observed fish of Indo-Pacific origin. Later, Steinitz published dozens of papers on fish, the fauna and the ecology of the southeast Mediterranean Sea and the Red Sea. In 1967, together with Dr. William Aron from the Smithsonian Institution in Washington DC, Steinitz launched a joint program on the role of the Suez Canal as a waterway for the passage of marine species between the Red Sea and the Mediterranean Sea.

After Steinitz's death in 1971, the survey and monitoring of the invasion of biota from the Indian Ocean to the Mediterranean Sea (and to a smaller extent biota migration in the opposite direction) proliferated, and it continues into the 21st century. The phenomenon of the continuous flow of marine biota across the Suez Canal is termed Lessepsian migration. To this day, hundreds species native to the Red Sea have been identified in the Mediterranean Sea, and probably others are yet unidentified. This human-mediated invasion has significantly impacted the Mediterranean ecosystem and endangered many local and endemic Mediterranean species.

Steinitz carried out research on a number of fish families, among them the Blenniidae, Cichlidae and Cyprinodontidae . He published nearly sixty papers in his different research fields, including on the discovery of fish new to science like the Kinneret-Sardine Acanthobrama terraesanctae, Garra Barreimiae (together with Henry Weed Fowler), and Tristramella sacra intermedia (together with A. Ben-Tuvia). Some of his publications appeared in special platforms he initiated and edited like the Contributions to the Knowledge of the Red Sea, Israel South Red Sea Expedition Scientific Reports, and Contributions to the Knowledge of Lake Tiberias. Together with Otto Haim Oren he published a Regional Bibliography of the Mediterranean coast of Israel and the adjacent Levant countries and Bibliography on Lake Kinnereth (Lake Tiberias).

== Research-supporting activities ==
Parallel to research and teaching at the university, Steinitz was involved in three types of research-supporting long term pursuits: (a) Participation, organization and management of scientific expeditions; (b) building-up and curation of a fish collection; (c) planning, founding and managing a marine research station near Eilat.

=== Scientific expeditions ===
In his earliest expeditions, in 1938–1940, Steinitz explored the fauna of Lake Hula and its surrounding marshland. Immediately following the outbreak of the Suez Crisis of 1956, Steinitz organized and headed an expedition examining the marine fauna along the Red Sea coasts of the Sinai Peninsula and the Suez Canal. In 1962 he led the first Israeli South Red Sea Expedition (ISRSE) which was based on the islands of the Dahlak Archipelago of Eritrea. The ISRSE was part of the first International Indian Ocean Expedition (IIOE) from 1962 to 1965. It was an interdisciplinary marine sciences research effort to survey the south Red Sea and to collect biological specimens and data from the region. Otto Haim Oren from the Haifa Sea Fishery Research Station and Lev Fishelson from the Tel Aviv University, both at that time doctoral students of Steinitz, assisted in organizing the project. The expedition team included a crew of researchers from universities and research institutes in Israel, as well as scientists from the Netherlands, USA and Ethiopia.

=== Building-up and management of a fish collection ===
The fish collection of the Hebrew University was begun in the 1920s by Prof. Israel Aharoni and Prof. Georg Haas, soon after the opening of the Department of Zoology. Steinitz added specimens from the very beginning of his work in the department. During the 1950s, the collection of fish specimens was carried out also by Prof. Adam Ben-Tuvia from the Sea Fishery Research Station in Haifa, a former student of Steinitz. A considerable augmentation of the collection occurred with the harvest of the expeditions to Sinai in 1956 and the Israeli South Red Sea Expeditions in the 1960s, when over 3,000 lots of fish were deposited. The taxonomic and zoogeographic identification of specimens was often conducted by correspondence between Steinitz and ichthyologists and curators of research institutes and science museums around the world. As a consequence, the collection became recognized as having major international importance, serving as a reference collection for the international community of ichthyologists.

=== Forging connections with the international scientific community ===
The formative years of Steinitz's career took place under the difficult conditions prevailing in any budding university, compounded with the instability of the wars which accompanied the resurrection of the state of Israel. Steinitz pursued connections and collaborations with the international community of scientists in order to ensure that research in Israel met the highest standards—a goal of critical importance for himself, the university, and the country. Furthermore, he realized that connections with colleagues from foreign countries would diminish the limits and disadvantages inherent in working in a small local scientific community geographically removed from global science centers. The wide and branched connections he wove over many years with scientists worldwide helped him to form a sound basis for what was, at that time, the early days of marine biology, oceanography, and ichthyology in Israel.

A special facet of Steinitz's international activities was building-up contacts and collaborations with West Germany's scientists, institutions and organizations. He commenced doing so years prior to the establishment, in 1965, of diplomatic relations between Germany and Israel. In 1946, working on the fish collection, he exchanged information and biological material with the German zoologist and geneticist Curt Kosswig. Prof. Kusswig emigrated in 1937 from Nazi Germany to Turkey, where he established the Department of Zoology at the Istanbul University. He returned to West Germany in 1955, was appointed head of the Zoological Institute and the Zoological Museum of the University of Hamburg, and visited Steinitz at the Hebrew University of Jerusalem. From the early 1960s Steinitz was invited several times to visit as a guest professor at the University of Hamburg and other German universities. He also visited and tied connections with museums of science, zoological museums and marine biology research stations in West Germany. He became acquainted with Dr. Günther Böhnecke, an oceanographer who played a central role after World War II in rehabilitating Germany's scientific relationships with countries worldwide. Dr. Böhnecke was an advisor to the German Research Foundation, the Deutsche Forschungsgemeinschaft (DFG), in the field of oceanography. The personal acquaintance and mutual appreciation between Steinitz and Böhnecke led to the support by the DFG for building and operating a marine biology laboratory near Eilat.

=== Founding a marine biology research laboratory near Eilat ===
Doctor Walter Steinitz, father of Heinz Steinitz, published in 1919 his vision and proposal to establish a marine biology research station on the Mediterranean coast of Palestine. The Hebrew University, and scholars in Palestine and in other countries, supported the plans of the project, but attempts to raise funds for it failed. Inspired by his father's vision, Heinz Steinitz resumed the effort to carry out the concept. However, he decided in the 1950s that the station would be better situated if it were built on the coast of the Red Sea, in the Gulf of Eilat (Gulf of Aqaba). He had three reasons for this preferred location: (a) Being by that time knowledgeable about the marine life in both the Mediterranean Sea and the Red Sea, Heinz Steinitz recognized the higher richness and the notable biodiversity of the latter, which still remained widely uninvestigated. (b) First reports about the presence of fishes of Indo-Pacific origin in the eastern Mediterranean Sea began to appear in the beginning of the twentieth century. Indo-Pacific fishes were also observed along the coast of Palestine for the first time by Walter Steinitz. The findings were indicative for intrusion of alien fishes into the eastern Mediterranean Sea via the Suez Canal that was constructed and opened only several decades prior to those first observations. Heinz Steinitz believed that a research base in the Golf of Eilat would be best placed to conduct investigations into the phenomenon of migration of marine biota from the Indian Ocean and the Red Sea (a northern branch of the Indian Ocean) through the Suez Canal to the Mediterranean Sea. Furthermore, a marine station in the Gulf of Eilat would facilitate analysis of the environmental and ecological changes resulting from man-made connection between the two global water bodies. (c) Polluting spills from the cities of Eilat and Aqaba into the Gulf waters, and pollutants discharged by ships and oil tankers that traffic along the Red Sea and cross the Suez Canal, constituted environmental perils. The marine research station staff in Eilat would be able to monitor impacts of anthropogenic activities on ecological processes and on the very sensitive marine ecosystems of the region.

In preparation for the construction of the marine research station, Steinitz visited during the 1950s and the 1960s dozens of oceanographic research stations and marine aquariums in Europe, the US and in the Caribbean Islands in order to learn from other's experience managing such facilities. Since the Gulf of Eilat is in the geographical periphery of Israel and remote from any academic center, and considering that the Israeli nucleus of marine biologists was at that time still very small, Steinitz developed relationships with colleagues abroad and convinced them to come and conduct some of their research in the planned station. He also reinforced the local station's research and management staff with an international scientific advisory board of oceanographers from Europe, Australia and the US in order to strengthen and sustain the nascent activity. In this way he guaranteed that the laboratory, from its inception, would be run at levels meeting international standards.

Steinitz received support and collaboration for his initiative from colleagues at other Israeli universities and research institutions, from the Israel Oceanographic and Limnology Research (IOLR) and from the German Research Foundation (DFG). The vision of Walter Steinitz was ultimately realized in 1968, five years after he died, when the Marine Biology Laboratory (MBL) of The Hebrew University near Eilat was inaugurated. Launching the laboratory was a peak in the career of Heinz Steinitz as an Israeli zoologist and as an internationally recognized senior marine biologist. He died in 1971 while being the first director of the laboratory; in his honor, the laboratory was renamed The Heinz Steinitz Marine Biology Laboratory.

The scientific activity in the station gained momentum soon after its inception, and under the leadership of its successive directors the research spread from marine biology to a wide scope of additional disciplines including chemical and physical oceanography, marine ecology and environmental quality. Supplemental buildings, new laboratories, teaching spaces and lecture halls were constructed. Israel's Council for Higher Education decided in 1985 that the station would become an interuniversity institute, with the marine biology laboratory being an integral part of it. The Interuniversity Institute for Marine Sciences (IUI) near Eilat became a national facility shared by all universities in Israel, The Weizmann Institute of Science and The Technion (Israel Institute of Technology).

== Activities in non-academic forums ==
Heinz Steinitz was active in ex-university professional forums and organizations, some of them of national importance.

Jointly with Prof. Georg Haas and Dr. O. Hecht, he founded in 1936 the Zoological Society of Israel.

In the 1940s plans were advanced to drain Lake Hula and its swamps. Being concerned about the potential ecological detrimental consequences, Steinitz opposed these plans. After the establishment of the state of Israel (1948), with the fast growing population, settling the country, and the rapidly growing economy, he became troubled about carelessness lack of attention to the value of nature, the danger of loss of wild fauna and flora, and the destruction of local natural resources. In 1953, together with Azaria Alon, Prof. Heinrich Mendelssohn, Prof. Amotz Zahavi, and others, he co-founded the Society for the Protection of Nature in Israel (SPNI), a non-profit environmental organization working to preserve plants, animals, open spaces, and natural environments that represent biodiversity.

Steinitz was appointed to a number of governmental forums and assigned to national tasks by different Ministries:

- In the Prime Minister's Office - member of the national committee of lakes and seas.
- In the Ministry of Agriculture – nominated adviser to the Sea Fisheries Research Station in Haifa (that later became the National Institute of Oceanography in Haifa), beginning work with its first director Dr. Helmut Lissner, and continuing with the next directors – Dr. Otto H. Oren, Prof. Baruch Kimor and Prof. Adam Ben-Tuvia.
- In the Ministry of Interior - Member of a committee dealing with prevention of pollution of the Red Sea.

Lake Kinneret is the largest aboveground freshwater reservoir in Israel. The lake is fed mainly by the Jordan River down-flowing from Lake Hula and the Hula valley. Two development projects in the 1950s profoundly impacted the ecosystem of Lake Kinneret: (i) Lake Hula and its marshland were drained and dried, and the soil revealed was converted to farmland. Consequently, the mineral salts composition of the water entering into Lake Kinneret was altered significantly. (ii) A water carrier was constructed and great amounts of drinking water began to be pumped and conducted from Lake Kinneret to central and south Israel. Science-based sustainable management of the lake's water quantity and quality, including understanding of the lake's biota as part of its ecosystem, became necessary. Steinitz chaired a joint committee of Mekorot (the national water company of Israel and the country's top agency for water management) and Tahal (TAHAL Group, the major provider of infrastructure development water projects), coordinating multidisciplinary investigation of Lake Kinneret. In parallel, The Kinneret Limnological Laboratory as part of Israel Oceanographic Limnological Research was founded in 1968. Ensuing research of the physical, chemical, biological and environmental components of the lake's ecosystem continuously supports intelligent management of this important national freshwater resource.

In 1965 Steinitz became member of the Israel Academy of Sciences and Humanities, and of the Academy's committee publishing the Fauna of Israel.

He was co-editor of the Bulletin of the Sea Fisheries Research Station in Haifa, and a board member of Bamidge, the journal of Israel's fishery research and development.

== Honors ==
The national and international reputation of Heinz Steinitz is reflected by names in his honor given to more than twenty newly discovered fishes, marine organisms and amphibians, listed in the Biographical Etymology of Marine Organism Names. Some names were given years after he died.

The fish species Tylognathus steinitziorum (discovered and named by Dr. Curt Kosswig in 1950, now called Hemigrammocapoeta nana) was dedicated to Walter Steinitz and his son Heinz Steinitz.

Animal species named after Heinz Steinitz include:

- The wasp Aphanogmus steinitzi (Priesner, 1936);
- The mole crab Albunea steinitzi (Holthuis, 1958) (Lipke Holthuis);
- Elasmopus steinitzi (Ruffo, 1959);
- The isopod crustacean Typhlocirolana steinitzi (Strouhal, 1961);
- The sea cucumber Bohadschia steinitzi (Cherbonnier, 1963);
- Pseudocyclops steinitzi (Por, 1968);
- The worm Hydroides steinitzi (Ben-Eliahu, 1972);
- The combtooth blenny Istiblennius steinitzi (Lotan, 1969) (synonym of Istiblennius flaviumbrinus (Rüppell, 1830));
- The scorpion fish Scorpaenodes steinitzi Klausewitz & Frøiland, 1970;
- Steinitz's goby Gammogobius steinitzi (Bath, 1971);
- The Flashlight Fish Photoblepharon steinitzi (T. Abe & Haneda, 1973);
- Steinitz' prawn goby Amblyeleotris steinitzi (Klausewitz, 1974);
- The Combtooth Blenny Omobranchus steinitzi (V. G. Springer & M. F. Gomon, 1975);
- Cocotropus steinitzi (Eschmeyer & Dor, 1978);
- The Red Triplefin Blenny Helcogramma steinitzi (Clark, 1980);
- Rubratella steinitzi (Pawlowski & Lee, 1991);
- The tree frog Hyla heinzsteinitzi (Hebrew: אילנית היינץ-שטייניץ) a synonym of H. japonica that has been apparently introduced into Israel.

== See also ==
- Category:Taxa named by Heinz Steinitz
