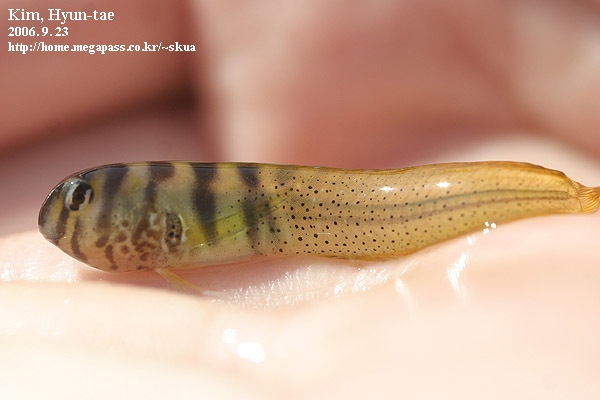

Conservation status
- Least Concern (IUCN 3.1)

Scientific classification
- Kingdom: Animalia
- Phylum: Chordata
- Class: Actinopterygii
- Division: Teleostei
- Order: Blenniiformes
- Family: Blenniidae
- Genus: Omobranchus
- Species: O. elegans

Binomial name
- Omobranchus elegans (Steindachner, 1876)

Synonyms
- Petroscirtes elegans Steindachner, 1876

= Omobranchus elegans =

Species of fish

Omobranchus elegans, known as the elegant blenny, is a species of combtooth blenny found in the Northwest Pacific ocean. This species can reach a length of 6.0 centimetres (2.4 in) TL.
