= Omobranchus ferox =

Conservation status
- Least Concern (IUCN 3.1)

Scientific classification
- Kingdom: Animalia
- Phylum: Chordata
- Class: Actinopterygii
- Order: Blenniiformes
- Family: Blenniidae
- Genus: Omobranchus
- Species: O. ferox

Binomial name
- Omobranchus ferox (Herre, 1927)

Synonyms
- Petroscirtes ferox Herre, 1927; Petroscirtes kranjiensis Herre, 1940; Omobranchus kranjiensis (Herre, 1940); Petroscirtes feliciana Herre, 1942; Petroscirtes waterousi Herre, 1942; Omobranchus dealmeida J. L. B. Smith, 1949; Cruantus dealmeida (Smith, 1949)

Species of fish

Omobranchus ferox, the gossamer blenny or the fang-toothed blenny, is a species of combtooth blenny found brackish waters in Africa and Asia.

== Size ==
This species can reach a length of 6.0 centimetres (2.4 in) SL.
