= Omobranchus steinitzi =

Conservation status
- Data Deficient (IUCN 3.1)

Scientific classification
- Kingdom: Animalia
- Phylum: Chordata
- Class: Actinopterygii
- Order: Blenniiformes
- Family: Blenniidae
- Genus: Omobranchus
- Species: O. steinitzi

Binomial name
- Omobranchus steinitzi V. G. Springer & M. F. Gomon, 1975

Species of fish

Omobranchus steinitzi is a species of combtooth blenny found in the western Indian Ocean, in the Red Sea.

== Size ==
This species reaches a length of 3.2 centimetres (1.3 in) SL.

== Etymology ==
The species is named after the Israeli marine biologist Heinz Steinitz. (1909-1971), Hebrew University (Jerusalem), for his contributions to marine biology.
