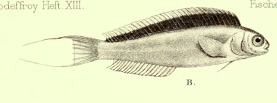

Conservation status
- Least Concern (IUCN 3.1)

Scientific classification
- Kingdom: Animalia
- Phylum: Chordata
- Class: Actinopterygii
- Order: Blenniiformes
- Family: Blenniidae
- Genus: Omobranchus
- Species: O. punctatus

Binomial name
- Omobranchus punctatus (Valenciennes, 1836)

Synonyms
- Blennechis punctatus Valenciennes, 1836; Petroscirtes lineolatus Kner, 1868; Omobranchus lineolatus (Kner, 1868); Omobranchus japonicus (Bleeker, 1869); Petroscirtes japonicus Bleeker, 1869; Petroscirtes kochi Weber, 1907

= Omobranchus punctatus =

Species of fish

Omobranchus punctatus, the muzzled blenny or the spotted oyster blenny is a species of combtooth blenny found in coral reefs in the Pacific and Indian Ocean.

It is distinguished from other blennies by the small gill openings that are restricted to the sides of the head above the dorsal-most level of the pectoral fin base. Males have distinct horizontal stripes across the body, while females have less distinct markings.

== Size ==
This species can reach a length of 9.5 centimetres (3.7 in) SL.
