= Omobranchus hikkaduwensis =

Conservation status
- Least Concern (IUCN 3.1)

Scientific classification
- Kingdom: Animalia
- Phylum: Chordata
- Class: Actinopterygii
- Order: Blenniiformes
- Family: Blenniidae
- Genus: Omobranchus
- Species: O. hikkaduwensis

Binomial name
- Omobranchus hikkaduwensis Bath, 1983

Species of fish

Omobranchus hikkaduwensis is a species of combtooth blenny found in the western central Pacific and eastern Indian Ocean.
