= Omobranchus verticalis =

Conservation status
- Least Concern (IUCN 3.1)

Scientific classification
- Kingdom: Animalia
- Phylum: Chordata
- Class: Actinopterygii
- Order: Blenniiformes
- Family: Blenniidae
- Genus: Omobranchus
- Species: O. verticalis

Binomial name
- Omobranchus verticalis V. G. Springer & M. F. Gomon, 1975

Species of fish

Omobranchus verticalis, the vertical blenny, is a species of combtooth blenny found in brackish waters in Australia.

== Size ==
This species reaches a length of 4.8 centimetres (1.9 in) SL.
