= Garra gymnothorax =

Scientific classification
- Domain: Eukaryota
- Kingdom: Animalia
- Phylum: Chordata
- Class: Actinopterygii
- Order: Cypriniformes
- Family: Cyprinidae
- Subfamily: Labeoninae
- Genus: Garra
- Species: G. gymnothorax

Binomial name
- Garra gymnothorax Berg, 1949

Species of fish

Garra gymnothorax, the chest scaleless garra, is a species of cyprinid fish in the genus Garra which is found in Iran. It was formerly considered as a subspecies of the more common Garra rufa, but FishBase elevates it to a full species. As the common name suggests, the breast of the fish is usually naked, though some populations do have imbedded scales here.
