= Omobranchus zebra =

Conservation status
- Least Concern (IUCN 3.1)

Scientific classification
- Kingdom: Animalia
- Phylum: Chordata
- Class: Actinopterygii
- Order: Blenniiformes
- Family: Blenniidae
- Genus: Omobranchus
- Species: O. zebra

Binomial name
- Omobranchus zebra (Bleeker, 1868)

Synonyms
- Petroscirtes zebra Bleeker, 1868; Petroscirtes bhattacharyae Chaudhuri, 1916

Species of fish

Omobranchus zebra, the zebra blenny, is a species of combtooth blenny found in the western Pacific and Indian Ocean.

== Size ==
This species can grow to a length of 6 centimetres (2.4 in) SL.
