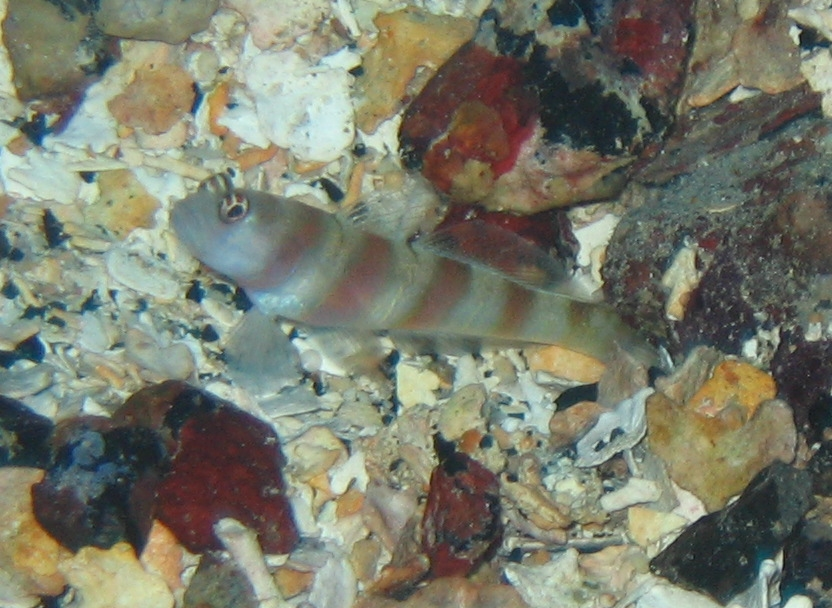

Scientific classification
- Kingdom: Animalia
- Phylum: Chordata
- Class: Actinopterygii
- Order: Gobiiformes
- Family: Gobiidae
- Genus: Amblyeleotris
- Species: A. steinitzi

Binomial name
- Amblyeleotris steinitzi (Klausewitz, 1974)

Synonyms
- Cryptocentrus steinitzi Klausewitz, 1974

= Steinitz' prawn goby =

Species of fish

Amblyeleotris steinitzi, Steinitz' prawn goby or simply Steinitz' goby, is a species of small fish in the family Gobiidae. It lives in association with an alpheid shrimp and is found from the Red Sea through the Indian Ocean to the western Pacific Ocean.

== Description ==
Steinitz' goby grows to a maximum length of 13 cm (5.1 in). It has protuberant eyes and a long narrow body. Its colouring is white with about five broad, transverse, reddish-brown bands with some fine pale yellow lines between them. The dorsal fin has a speckling of small orange spots and has seven spines and twelve soft rays while the anal fin has a single spine and also twelve soft rays.

== Distribution and habitat ==
Steinitz' goby is found in shallow parts of the Red Sea and adjoining western Indian Ocean, the Chagos Archipelago and Mauritius, the Marshall Islands, the Seychelles, southern Japan and the Great Barrier Reef. It is usually found on sandy bottoms on reef flats, outer lagoons, estuaries and bays at depths down to 43 metres (141 ft).

== Biology ==
Steinitz' goby shares a large burrow system with alpheid shrimp such as Alpheus purpurilenticularis or Alpheus djeddensis. The goby does not take part in the burrowing and the shrimp does all the excavation in a sandy or silty area of the seabed. The burrow has one or more openings, the positions of which are altered as the shrimp engages in its burrowing activities. A new entrance may be opened after the goby pokes its head through the substrate from inside. Entrances can be moved by as much as 80 centimetres (31 in) in a day with the location of the main part of the burrow remaining unchanged. The entrance may be reinforced by shell and coral fragments particularly before nightfall but still may collapse during the night, a time during which both partners remain inside the burrow. In the morning the shrimp is often seen bringing out sediment and depositing it nearby whereas in the evening, sediment is taken into the burrow, perhaps to allow feeding to take place during the night.

During the day the goby rests on the burrow floor, half out of the opening, or may make forays further afield to feed. It eats small invertebrates that it picks out of the sediment that has been disturbed by the shrimp or takes mouthfuls of sediment and extracts any edible matter. The shrimp is mainly a detritus feeder and is constantly stirring up the substrate. The shrimp cannot see well and extends its antennae behind the goby which uses a flick of its tail to alert the shrimp to approaching fish whereupon the shrimp rapidly retreats. The goby distinguishes between predators, bottom-stirring fish that may damage the burrow and harmless species and reacts appropriately. When the goby takes fright and swims into the burrow head first, the shrimp darts in immediately.

Steinitz' goby is territorial. If a neighbouring goby is aggressive, the burrow entrance can be moved further away from the adjacent territory. When the breeding season arrives, the entrance can be moved closer to another burrow occupied by a fish of the opposite sex. The shrimp also forms a pair bond with a shrimp in an adjoining burrow, a bond that can remain stable for many months.

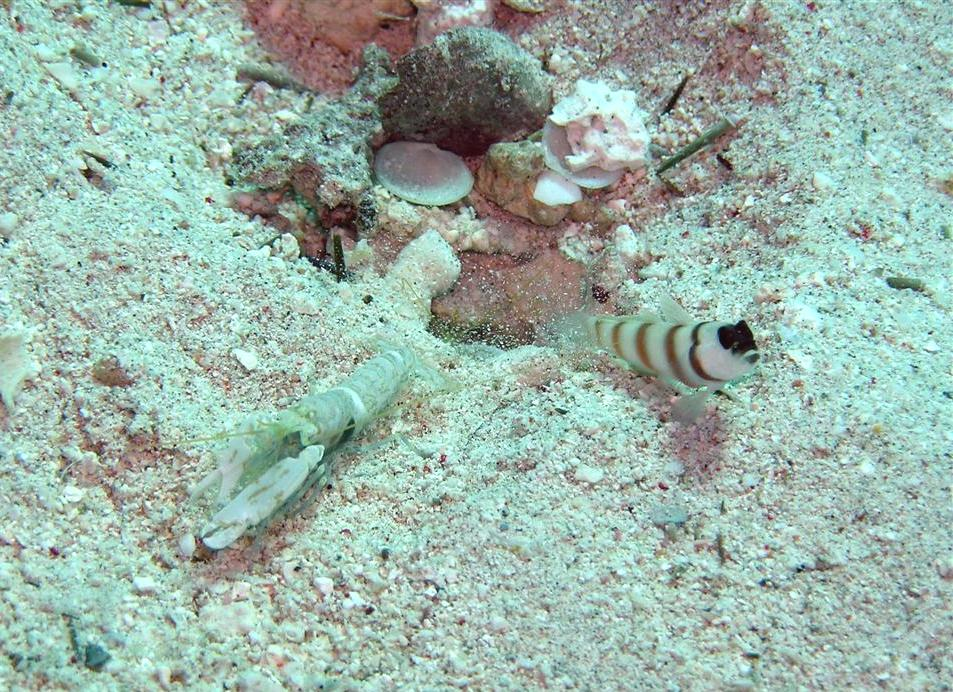
Steinitz' goby together with its commensal, Alpheus djeddensis

== Name ==
The specific name and common name honour of the Israeli marine biologist and herpetologist Heinz Steinitz (1909–1971), who founded of the marine laboratory that bears his name, in Eilat, Israel, on the Gulf of Aqaba, where this species can be found.
