= Omobranchus robertsi =

Conservation status
- Data Deficient (IUCN 3.1)

Scientific classification
- Kingdom: Animalia
- Phylum: Chordata
- Class: Actinopterygii
- Order: Blenniiformes
- Family: Blenniidae
- Genus: Omobranchus
- Species: O. robertsi

Binomial name
- Omobranchus robertsi V. G. Springer, 1981

Species of fish

Robert's blenny, Omobranchus robertsi is a species of combtooth blenny found in the western central Pacific Ocean, around Papua New Guinea.

The specific name honours Tyson R. Roberts (b. 1940), the American ichthyologist, who collected the type specimen and made it available to the author.
