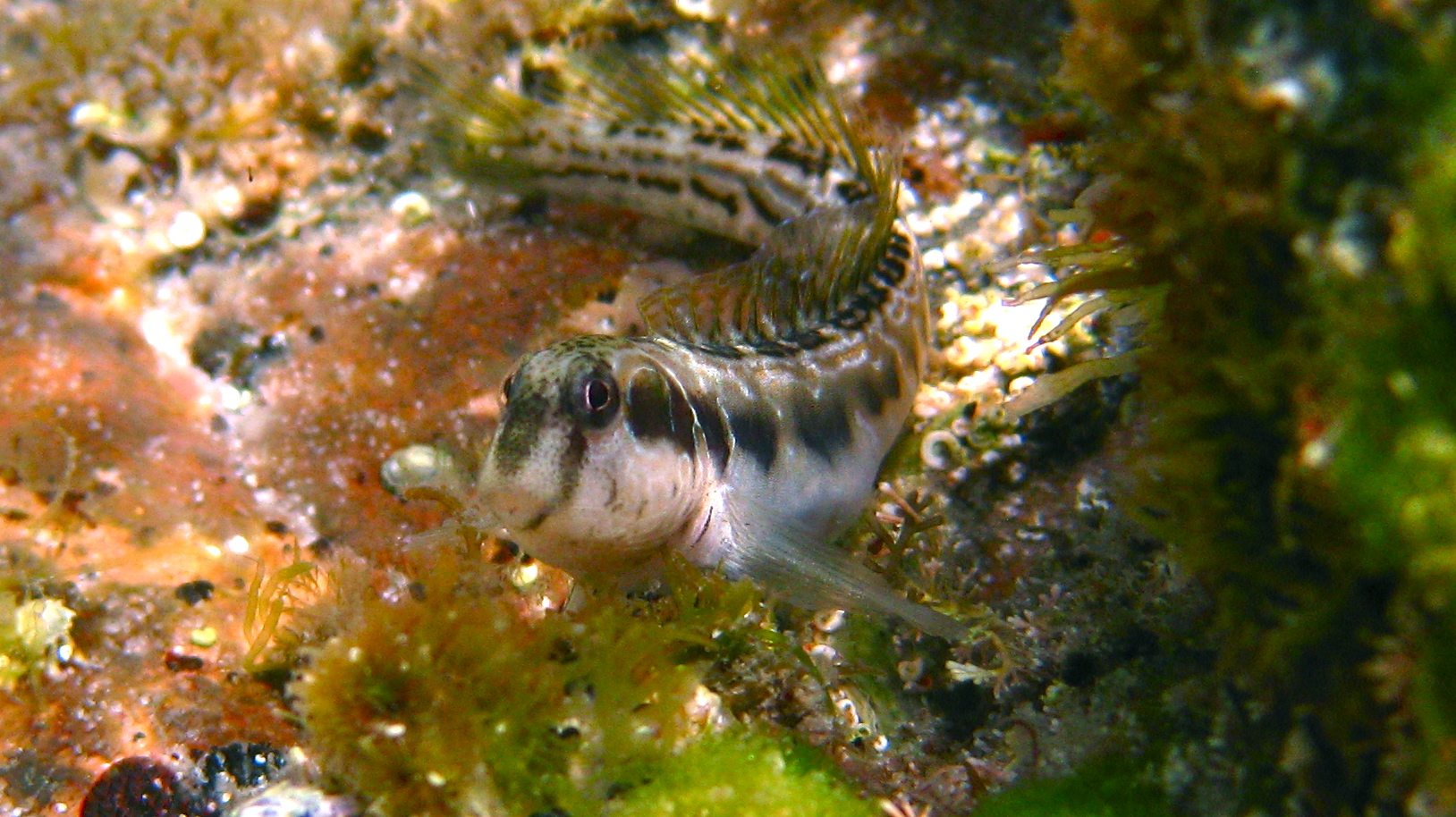
- Omobranchus germaini

Scientific classification
- Domain: Eukaryota
- Kingdom: Animalia
- Phylum: Chordata
- Class: Actinopterygii
- Order: Blenniiformes
- Family: Blenniidae
- Subfamily: Blenniinae
- Genus: Omobranchus; Valenciennes, 1836

Type species
- Blennechis fasciolatus Valenciennes, 1836

Species
- See text

= Omobranchus =

Genus of fishes

Omobranchus is a large genus of combtooth blennies found in the Pacific, Atlantic, and Indian oceans.

== Species ==
There are currently 21 recognized species in this genus:

- Omobranchus anolius (Valenciennes, 1836)
- Omobranchus aurosplendidus (J. Richardson, 1846)
- Omobranchus banditus J. L. B. Smith, 1959 (Bandit blenny)
- Omobranchus elegans (Steindachner, 1876)
- Omobranchus elongatus (W. K. H. Peters, 1855) (Cloister blenny)
- Omobranchus fasciolatoceps (J. Richardson, 1846)
- Omobranchus fasciolatus (Valenciennes, 1836) (Arab blenny)
- Omobranchus ferox (Herre, 1927) (Gossamer blenny)
- Omobranchus germaini (Sauvage, 1883) (Germain's blenny)
- Omobranchus hikkaduwensis Bath, 1983
- Omobranchus loxozonus (D. S. Jordan & Starks, 1906)
- Omobranchus mekranensis (Regan, 1905) (Mekran blenny)
- Omobranchus obliquus (Garman, 1903) (Roundhead blenny)
- Omobranchus punctatus (Valenciennes, 1836) (Muzzled blenny)
- Omobranchus robertsi V. G. Springer, 1981
- Omobranchus rotundiceps (W. J. Macleay, 1881)
- Omobranchus smithi (Rao, 1974)
- Omobranchus steinitzi V. G. Springer & M. F. Gomon, 1975
- Omobranchus verticalis V. G. Springer & M. F. Gomon, 1975
- Omobranchus woodi (Gilchrist & W. W. Thompson, 1908) (Kappie blenny)
- Omobranchus zebra (Bleeker, 1868)
