= Omobranchus smithi =

Conservation status
- Least Concern (IUCN 3.1)

Scientific classification
- Kingdom: Animalia
- Phylum: Chordata
- Class: Actinopterygii
- Order: Blenniiformes
- Family: Blenniidae
- Genus: Omobranchus
- Species: O. smithi

Binomial name
- Omobranchus smithi (Rao, 1974)

Synonyms
- Cruantus smithi Rao, 1974; Omobranchus meniscus Springer & Gomon, 1975

Species of ray-finned fish

Omobranchus smithi is a species of combtooth blenny found in the western Pacific and Indian oceans.

== Etymology ==
The specific name honours the South African chemist and ichthyologist James Leonard Brierley Smith.
