= Omobranchus banditus =

Conservation status
- Least Concern (IUCN 3.1)

Scientific classification
- Kingdom: Animalia
- Phylum: Chordata
- Class: Actinopterygii
- Order: Blenniiformes
- Family: Blenniidae
- Genus: Omobranchus
- Species: O. banditus

Binomial name
- Omobranchus banditus J. L. B. Smith, 1959

Species of fish

Omobranchus banditus, the bandit blenny, is a species of combtooth blenny found in the western Indian Ocean. This species can reach a length of 6.0 centimetres (2.4 in) SL.
