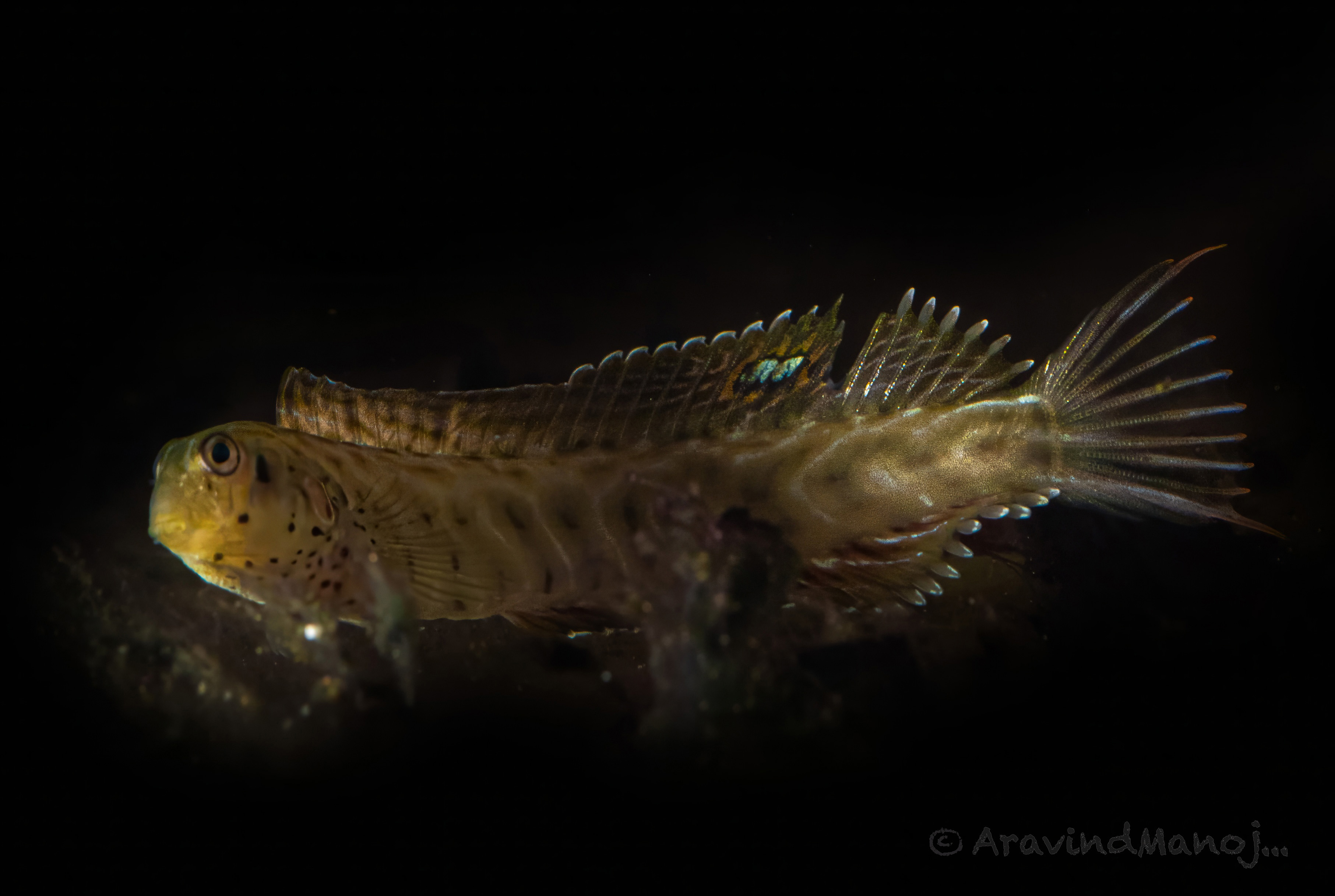

Conservation status
- Least Concern (IUCN 3.1)

Scientific classification
- Kingdom: Animalia
- Phylum: Chordata
- Class: Actinopterygii
- Order: Blenniiformes
- Family: Blenniidae
- Genus: Omobranchus
- Species: O. elongatus

Binomial name
- Omobranchus elongatus (W. K. H. Peters, 1855)

Synonyms
- Petroscirtes elongatusPeters, 1855; Petroscirtes dispar Fowler, 1937; Petroscirtes kallosoma Bleeker, 1858; Omobranchus kallosoma (Bleeker, 1858)

= Omobranchus elongatus =

Chevroned blenny

Species of fish

Omobranchus elongatus, also known as the cloister blenny or chevroned blenny, is a species of combtooth blenny found on coral reefs of the western Pacific and Indian Ocean.

== Description ==
This species can reach a length of 5.0 centimetres (2.0 in) SL. This species can also be found in the aquarium trade.
