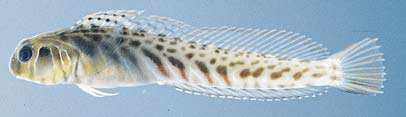

Conservation status
- Least Concern (IUCN 3.1)

Scientific classification
- Kingdom: Animalia
- Phylum: Chordata
- Class: Actinopterygii
- Order: Blenniiformes
- Family: Blenniidae
- Genus: Omobranchus
- Species: O. obliquus

Binomial name
- Omobranchus obliquus (Garman, 1903)

Synonyms
- Petroscirtes obliquus Garman, 1903

= Omobranchus obliquus =

Species of fish

Omobranchus obliquus, the roundhead blenny or the mangrove blenny, is a species of combtooth blenny found in coral reefs in the Pacific and Indian oceans. It grows to 5 to 10 cm (2.0 to 3.9 in) in length.

== Habitat ==
This species can be found in coral reels in both Indian and Pacific oceans, but it is also spotted in areas of Philippines Islands, Guam, New Guinea, Samoa Islands and many more. It is also lives in tidal pools, rocky shores, edges of mangrove swamps, and muddy to sandy bottoms of algae and eel grass. However, it is an invasive species found at Kaneohe, Oahu at places with fouling habitat that are sheltered. Often, this species is spotted 2 m (6.6 ft) deep in salty or seawater, and never seen at depths over 4 m (13 ft).

== Behavior ==
Despite this species being found in many different territories, it often prefers living in small groups or in isolation, but they are considered to be juveniles. Like other blenniids, it is a protector and home builder. Due to its rounded head, long body with brown/greenish and yellow hues, it easily blends in with its surroundings. It also has excellent vision due to its bulbous eyes.
