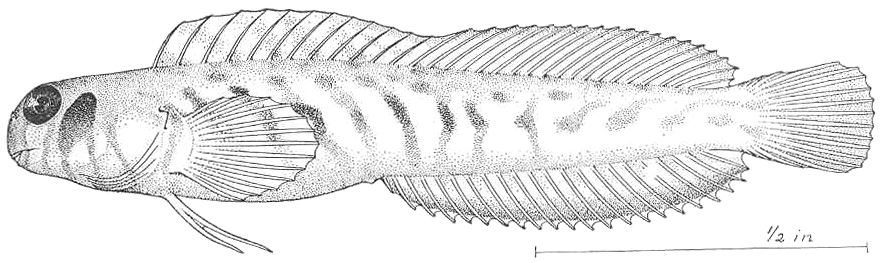

Conservation status
- Least Concern (IUCN 3.1)

Scientific classification
- Kingdom: Animalia
- Phylum: Chordata
- Class: Actinopterygii
- Order: Blenniiformes
- Family: Blenniidae
- Genus: Omobranchus
- Species: O. rotundiceps

Binomial name
- Omobranchus rotundiceps (W. J. Macleay, 1881)

Synonyms
- Petroscirtes rotundiceps Macleay, 1881; Petroscirtes fasciolatus Macleay, 1881; Salarias furcatus De Vis, 1884; Salarias furtivus De Vis, 1886; Petroscirtes macleayi James Douglas OgilbyOgilby, 1886; Hypleurochilus loxias Jordan & Seale 1905); Omobranchus loxias (Jordan & Seale 1905); Graviceps angelus Whitley, 1959; Omobranchus angelus (Whitley, 1959)

= Omobranchus rotundiceps =

Species of fish

The Rotund blenny, Omobranchus rotundiceps, is a species of combtooth blenny found in the western Pacific Ocean, around Queensland, Australia.
