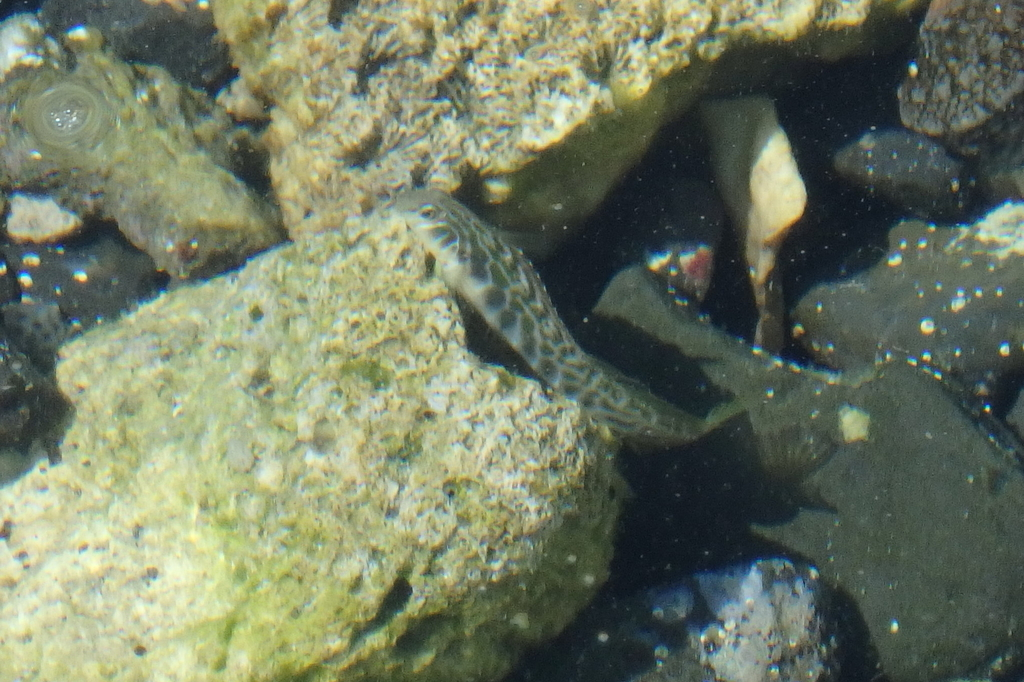

Conservation status
- Least Concern (IUCN 3.1)

Scientific classification
- Kingdom: Animalia
- Phylum: Chordata
- Class: Actinopterygii
- Order: Blenniiformes
- Family: Blenniidae
- Genus: Omobranchus
- Species: O. loxozonus

Binomial name
- Omobranchus loxozonus (D. S. Jordan & Starks, 1906)

Synonyms
- Petroscirtes loxozonus Jordan & Starks, 1906

= Omobranchus loxozonus =

Species of fish

Omobranchus loxozonus is a species of combtooth blenny found in the northwest Pacific ocean, around southern Japan.
