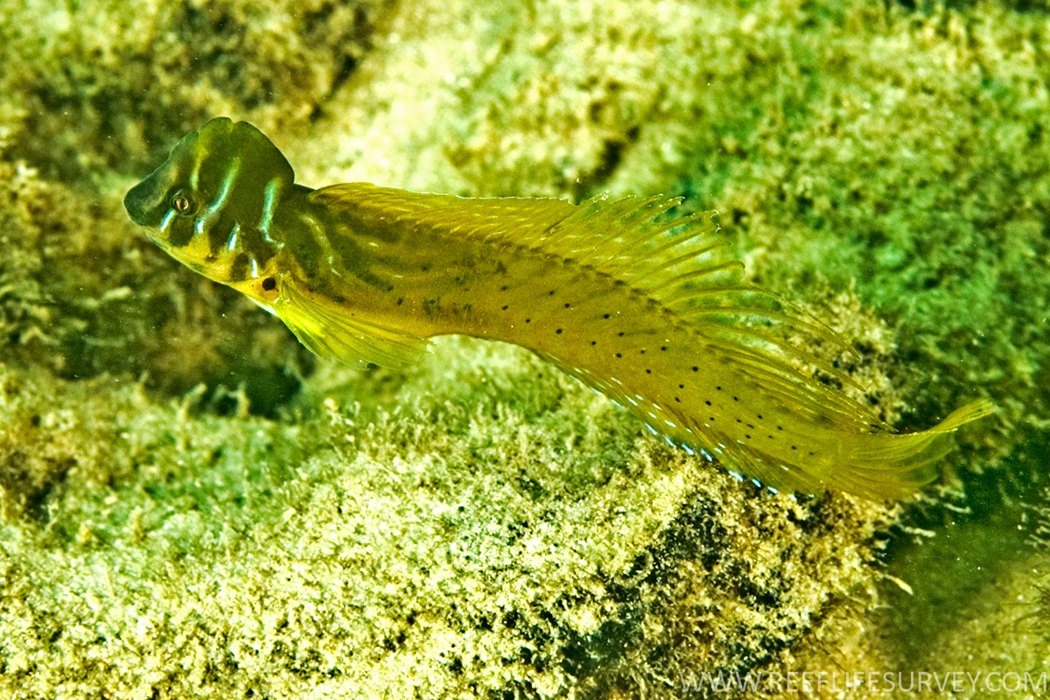

Conservation status
- Least Concern (IUCN 3.1)

Scientific classification
- Kingdom: Animalia
- Phylum: Chordata
- Class: Actinopterygii
- Order: Blenniiformes
- Family: Blenniidae
- Genus: Omobranchus
- Species: O. anolius

Binomial name
- Omobranchus anolius (Valenciennes, 1836)

Synonyms
- Blennechis anolius Valenciennces, 1836; Petroscirtes anolius (Valenciennes, 1836)

= Omobranchus anolius =

Species of fish

Omobranchus anolius, the oyster blenny, is a species of combtooth blenny found in coral reefs in the western Pacific ocean. It can reach a maximum length of 7.5 centimetres (3.0 in) TL.
