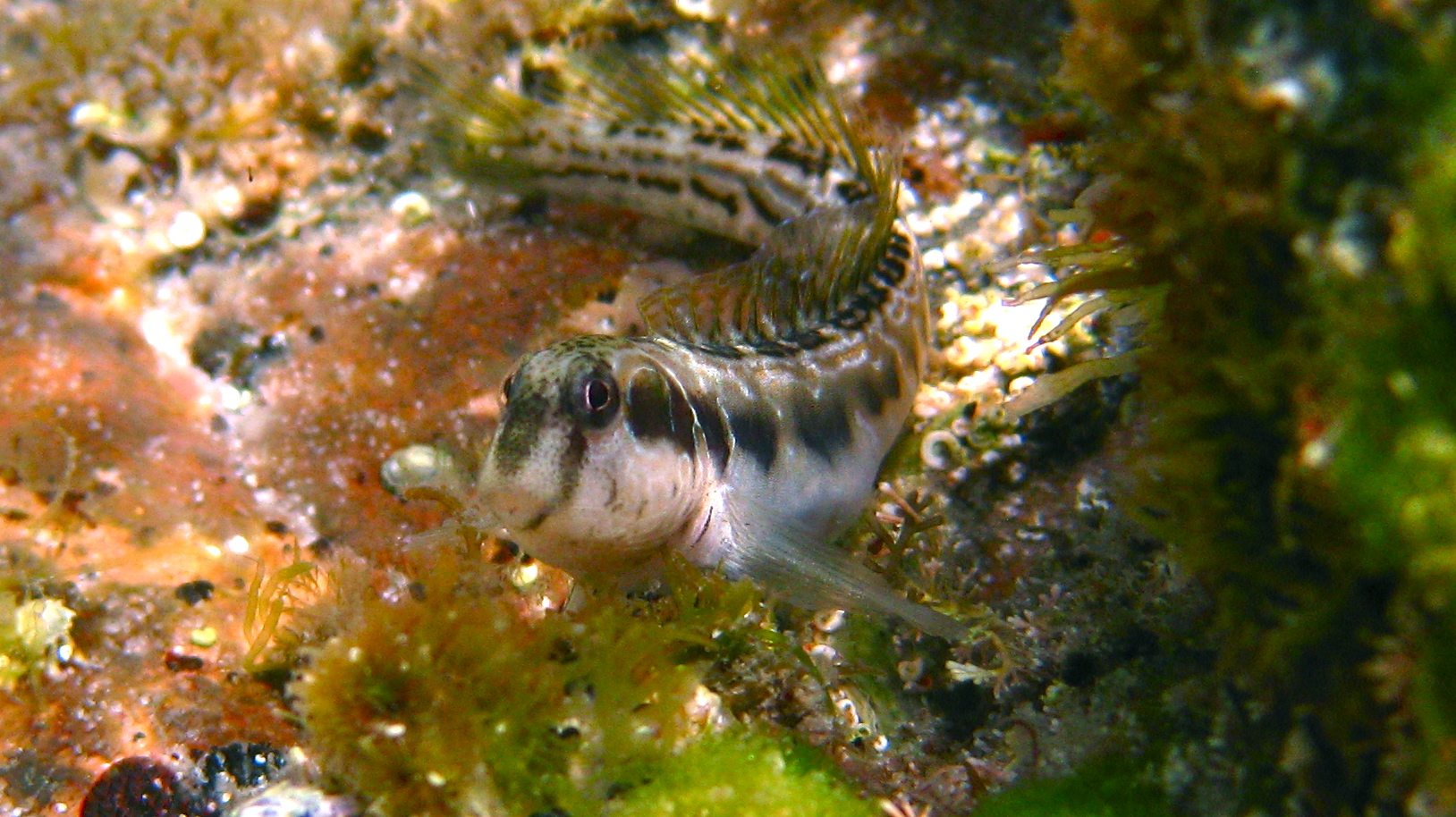

Conservation status
- Least Concern (IUCN 3.1)

Scientific classification
- Kingdom: Animalia
- Phylum: Chordata
- Class: Actinopterygii
- Order: Blenniiformes
- Family: Blenniidae
- Genus: Omobranchus
- Species: O. germaini

Binomial name
- Omobranchus germaini (Sauvage, 1883)

Synonyms
- Petroscirtes germaini Sauvage, 1883

= Omobranchus germaini =

Species of fish

Omobranchus germaini, Germain's blenny, is a species of combtooth blenny found in coral reefs in the western Pacific ocean.

== Size ==
This species can reach a length of 8.0 centimetres (3.1 in) TL.

== Etymology ==
The specific name honours the collector of the type, the French military veterinarian Louis Rodolphe Germain (1827-1917).
