= Omobranchus aurosplendidus =

Conservation status
- Vulnerable (IUCN 3.1)

Scientific classification
- Kingdom: Animalia
- Phylum: Chordata
- Class: Actinopterygii
- Order: Blenniiformes
- Family: Blenniidae
- Genus: Omobranchus
- Species: O. aurosplendidus

Binomial name
- Omobranchus aurosplendidus (J. Richardson, 1846)

Synonyms
- Blennius aurosplendidus J. Richardson, 1846

Species of fish

Omobranchus aurosplendidus is a species of combtooth blenny found in the Northwest Pacific ocean, around China and Macau.
