= Omobranchus woodi =

Conservation status
- Least Concern (IUCN 3.1)

Scientific classification
- Kingdom: Animalia
- Phylum: Chordata
- Class: Actinopterygii
- Order: Blenniiformes
- Family: Blenniidae
- Genus: Omobranchus
- Species: O. woodi

Binomial name
- Omobranchus woodi (Gilchrist & W. W. Thompson, 1908)

Synonyms
- Aspidontus woodi Gilchrist & Thompson, 1908

Species of fish

Omobranchus woodi, the kappie blenny, is a species of combtooth blenny found in the southeast Atlantic and western Indian Ocean.

== Size ==
This species can grow to a length of 8.0 centimetres (3.1 in) SL.

== Etymology ==
The identity of the person honoured in this species' specific name is given as J. Wood of Natal who collected many marine specimens, including the type of this species.
