= Omobranchus fasciolatus =

Conservation status
- Least Concern (IUCN 3.1)

Scientific classification
- Kingdom: Animalia
- Phylum: Chordata
- Class: Actinopterygii
- Order: Blenniiformes
- Family: Blenniidae
- Genus: Omobranchus
- Species: O. fasciolatus

Binomial name
- Omobranchus fasciolatus (Valenciennes, 1836)

Synonyms
- Blennechis fasciolatus Valenciennes, 1836; Omobranchus striatus (Jatzow & Lenz, 1898); Petroscirtes striatus Jatzow & Lenz, 1898

Species of fish

Omobranchus fasciolatus, the Arab blenny or barred Arab blenny, is a species of combtooth blenny found in the western Indian Ocean.

== Size ==
This species can reach a maximum length of 6.8 centimetres (2.7 in) TL.
