= Omobranchus mekranensis =

Conservation status
- Vulnerable (IUCN 3.1)

Scientific classification
- Kingdom: Animalia
- Phylum: Chordata
- Class: Actinopterygii
- Order: Blenniiformes
- Family: Blenniidae
- Genus: Omobranchus
- Species: O. mekranensis

Binomial name
- Omobranchus mekranensis (Regan, 1905)

Synonyms
- Petroscirtes mekranensis Regan, 1905

Species of fish

Omobranchus mekranensis, the Mekran blenny, is a species of combtooth blenny found in the western Indian Ocean.

== Size ==
This species can grow to a length of 6.0 centimetres (2.4 in) TL.
