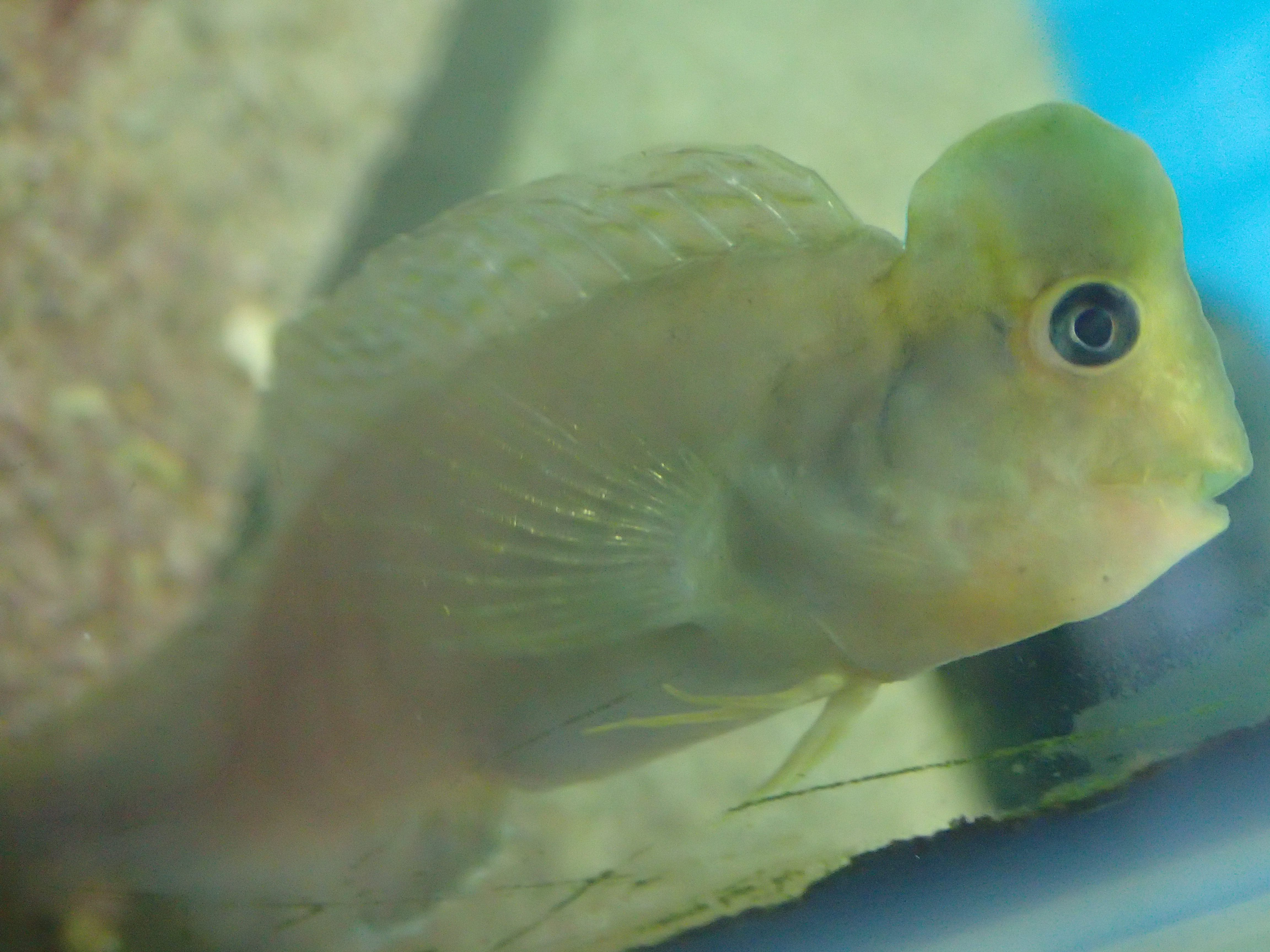

Conservation status
- Least Concern (IUCN 3.1)

Scientific classification
- Kingdom: Animalia
- Phylum: Chordata
- Class: Actinopterygii
- Order: Blenniiformes
- Family: Blenniidae
- Genus: Omobranchus
- Species: O. fasciolatoceps

Binomial name
- Omobranchus fasciolatoceps (J. Richardson, 1846)

Synonyms
- Blennius fasciolatoceps J. Richardson, 1846

= Omobranchus fasciolatoceps =

Species of fish

Omobranchus fasciolatoceps is a species of combtooth blenny found in the northwest Pacific ocean, around southern Japan and China.
