= Israeli Marine Mammal Research and Assistance Center =

Israeli non-profit organization

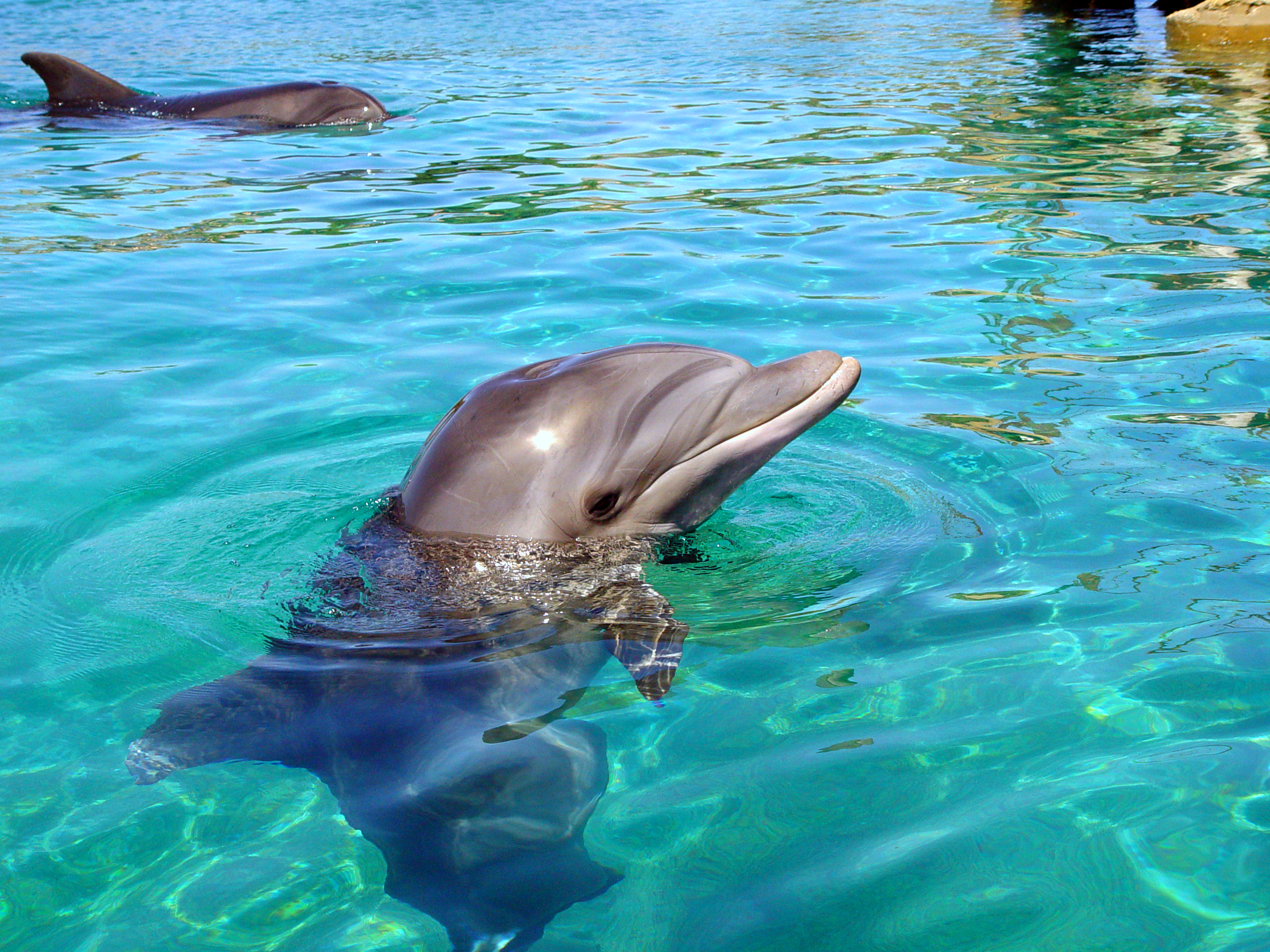
Dolphin at Dolphin Reef in Eilat

The Israel Marine Mammal Research and Assistance Center (IMMRAC) is an Israeli non-profit organization dedicated to the study and conservation of cetacean populations that inhabit the Eastern Mediterranean and the Gulf of Aqaba/Eilat.

IMMRAC's activities include:

- Updating the list of Mediterranean cetacean species that range into the inadequately studied Eastern Basin.
- Conducting near-shore surveys with the goal of studying the habitat use, site fidelity, home-range extent, trends in population size and genetic profiles of coastal bottlenose dolphins, the most common local species.
- Manning a nationwide, 24-hour alert net which responds to real-time reports of distressed-at-sea, floating, beached and stranded dolphins, as well as a modest rehabilitation facility for sick/injured animals.
- Conducting post mortem examinations to determine age, feeding habits through stomach contents, possible cause of death, general state of health and level of tissue contaminants. Tissue samples are also sent to Israeli and international laboratories for analyses.
- Pursuing a multi-year longitudinal study of dolphin-human relations expressed by a solitary sociable female bottlenose dolphin in the gulf of Aqaba/Eilat.
- Devising means of reducing by-catch, specifically of bottlenose dolphins, which have a close and costly association with the local trawl-boat fleet.
- Launching public awareness campaigns to draw attention to important ecological issues affecting dolphins in the Middle East, as well as the marine bio-diversity of our whole planet. This is done by means of media interviews, press releases, public lectures, information stands and activity centers at various “green” exhibitions, as well as by offering educational programs at all age levels, from kindergarten to university.
- Lobbying for legislation aimed at conservation of the marine environment at large, and specifically marine mammals.

== See also ==
- Wildlife of Israel
- Green Zionist Alliance
