= Walter Steinitz =

German-born Israeli cardiologist, zoologist and fisheries research pioneer

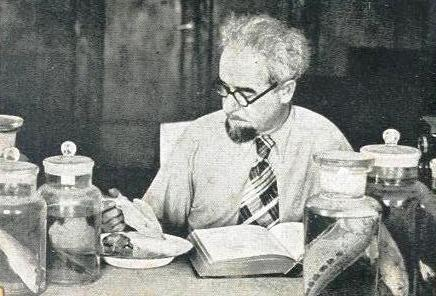
- Born: February 12, 1882; Breslau, German Empire (now Wrocław, Poland)
- Died: December 14, 1963 (aged 81); Bad Nauheim, Germany
- Education: University of Breslau; University of Rostock
- Known for: Pioneering fisheries research in Palestine, studying Red Sea migration into the Mediterranean Sea via the Suez Canal
- Scientific career
- Fields: Cardiology, zoology, marine biology

Walter Steinitz (Hebrew: ולטר שטייניץ; 12 February 1882 – 14 December 1963) was a German-born Israeli cardiologist, zoologist, and fisheries research pioneer in Israel.

== Biography ==
Walter Steinitz was born in Breslau, German Empire (now Wrocław, Poland) in 1882. He was the son of Sigismund Steinitz (1845–1889), a merchant, and Augustin Cohn Steinitz (1850–1906); brother of the mathematician Ernst Steinitz (1871–1928); and also brother of the lawyer Kurt Steinitz (1872–1929).

He studied medicine in the Universities of Breslau and Rostock, Germany, and obtained his medical doctoral degree (M.D.) from the University of Rostock in 1905. Following his return to Breslau he earned his living as a cardiologist, and at the same time he also studied zoology. These studies were interrupted temporarily during World War I by service as a physician in the German army. After the war, being interested especially in marine organisms, he wrote a doctoral thesis on the development of the eye in the humpback whale and obtained a Ph.D. degree from the University of Breslau (now University of Wrocław) in 1918. In recognition of his first and leading research of the marine fauna of the Eastern Mediterranean Basin, the Breslau University granted him a position as Privatdozent and lecturer in zoology.

Walter Steinitz's first wife, Marta Schindler (1887–1924), was mother of his three sons. After he became a widower he married Alma Friedlander (1887–1977).

The rise at the beginning of 1933 of the Nazi regime brought an end to both his medical and academic career. He immediately recognized there was no future for a reasonable life as a Jew in Germany. Consequently, he emigrated that same year, together with his wife Alma, to Palestine. He joined a group of Jewish German-born settlers who together founded in 1933 Ramot HaShavim, a village organized as an agricultural commune. In 1933–1938, he was member of the leading committee of the village. In 1939 he chaired the committee for less than a year. He was a highly educated person, a polymath with wide interests in the fields of life sciences, geology, philosophy and music. With his skills and experience as teacher, he led courses and gave lectures in the village on biological and agricultural topics relevant to farmers, and contributed to the cultural life of the village. Until his death in 1963, he made his living in Ramot HaShavim from a chicken farm, where he attempted to improve egg production by poultry breeding. After his death in Bad Nauheim, Germany, he was buried in Ramot HaShavim.

His three sons were born, grew up and studied in Germany before they emigrated to Palestine. He inspired them to study sciences: Ernst Steinitz (1907–1980), was an internist in the private sector; Heinz Steinitz (1909–1971) was a professor of zoology and marine biology in the Department of Zoology, The Hebrew University of Jerusalem; and Gideon Steinitz (1911–1975) was a mathematician in his academic education, became a meteorologist in Palestine and eventually was head of the Israel Meteorological Service.

== Combining scientific investigation with Zionism ==
Walter Steinitz was a committed Zionist who developed his unique way of combining scientific pursuit with Zionistic activism. He participated the Zionist Congresses in Basel in 1903 and in London (1920); attended the inauguration ceremony of the Hebrew University of Jerusalem in 1925; chose the coast of Palestine and the eastern Mediterranean Sea as the zoogeographic research area he would study while still being affiliated to the Breslau University; and formulated plans for the establishment of a marine research station in Palestine nearly fifteen years prior his decision to move and live in that country. Finally, once he decided to leave Germany, his preference to emigrate to Palestine, and not elsewhere in Europe or America, certainly stemmed from his Zionist convictions.

== Pioneering research of fishes in Palestine ==
Steinitz traveled to Palestine for zoological excursions in the second and third decades of the twentieth century. He explored, documented and analyzed his findings of fishes of the Eastern Mediterranean Basin, commenced scientific collections of fishes, and was the first to publish a comprehensive fisheries research of Palestine. His investigations were pioneering in two scientific respects: First, he discovered new marine organisms in the region, and second, he found fishes of Indo-Pacific origin along the coast of Palestine. The Suez Canal, a man-made connection between the Red Sea and the Mediterranean Sea, was opened only a few decades prior to his investigations in Palestine. The presence of Indo-Pacific species along the Mediterranean coast of Palestine revealed to Steinitz an influx of fishes from the Red Sea – a northern branch of the Indian Ocean – into the east Mediterranean Sea via the Suez Canal waterway, and it suggested that changes had occurred in the marine life of the south east Mediterranean Sea due to human intervention. He argued that with the new situation “…it is the only place on earth where two quite different zoological marine provinces have come into direct touch with one another” and that the Canal “…connects two oceans having each different fauna from the other”. Steinitz was among the first to call for monitoring the impact of the opening of the Suez Canal on the Levant biota. Studies of the invasions of Red Sea species into the Mediterranean Sea, and their ecological consequences for the Mediterranean marine biota, have proliferated since then and are ongoing in the twenty first century. The phenomenon of migration of marine species form the Red Sea through the Suez Canal into the Mediterranean Sea is now termed Lessepsian migration.

== A marine biology research station in Palestine ==
As early as 1919 Steinitz published his vision to establish a marine biology research station on the coast of Palestine. He was convinced that a research station located in Palestine would be essential for researching and following changes occurring in the marine biota of the Levant. An exchange of letters on the topic with Prof. Albert Einstein during the period 1919–1937 represent Steinitz’s persistent efforts to raise funds and support for the endeavor. Soon after immigration to Palestine he submitted in 1933 to the Hebrew University of Jerusalem an elaborate proposal for the establishment in Tel Aviv of a biological marine station and aquarium for the study of the Mediterranean marine fauna and as a center for lectures and teaching courses. He received support from the biochemist and Zionist leader Chaim Weizmann, and from Tel Aviv’s mayor Israel Rokach. As a result, the Aquarium and Marine Station Tel Aviv Society Ltd was founded in 1936. Among the group’s founders were the mayor of Tel Aviv, Israel Rokach; Dr. Felix Danziger; Prof. Alfred Klopstock and other scholars. Albert Einstein was Honorary President and Walter Steinitz was the scientific director. The station was supposed to be built on land allocated by the Tel Aviv municipality, on the shore near the Yarkon estuary. The plan included construction of an aquarium, research rooms, a lecture hall and a library, all for the use of local researchers and guests from the international scientific community. The society’s agenda encompassed basic marine biology research of the eastern Mediterranean Sea, research to support fishing as a source of income, and exhibitions of marine animals to the public in the aquarium. The efforts to build the station in Tel Aviv were blocked when World War II broke out. Walter Steinitz made a final, brief and unsuccessful attempt to operate in 1939 a sea laboratory in Nahariya. His dream was ultimately fulfilled three decades later by his son Heinz Steinitz. A marine biology laboratory was inaugurated in 1968 on the coast of the Red Sea, in Eilat, the Gulf of Aqaba, and it is named The Heinz Steinitz Marine Biology Laboratory, in memory of its founder and first director. The laboratory became the basic element in the subsequent development of The Interuniversity Institute for Marine Sciences near Eilat.

== Honors ==
The sea anemone Cribrina steinitzi Pax 1925 was named after Walter Steinitz, while the fish species Tylognathus steinitziorum Kosswig (synonym of Hemigrammocapoeta nana Heckel 1843, discovered and named by Curt Kosswig in 1950), was dedicated to Walter Steinitz and his son Heinz Steinitz.
