= Garra nana =

Conservation status
- Near Threatened (IUCN 3.1)

Scientific classification
- Kingdom: Animalia
- Phylum: Chordata
- Class: Actinopterygii
- Division: Teleostei
- Order: Cypriniformes
- Family: Cyprinidae
- Subfamily: Labeoninae
- Genus: Garra
- Species: G. nana

Binomial name
- Garra nana (Heckel, 1843)

Synonyms
- Hemigrammocapoeta nana Heckel, 1843; Tylognathus nanus Heckel, 1843; Tylognathus steinitziorum Kosswig, 1950

Species of fish

Garra nana is a ray-finned fish species in the family Cyprinidae. It is found in Israel, Jordan and Syria. Its natural habitats are freshwater rivers, lakes and ponds of the Barada and Jordan River drainage basins, as well as the Kishon River. This bottom-dwelling fish is often overlooked, as it is small and prefers to hide among stones and water plants. It is an omnivore which feeds on aufwuchs. The species was previously placed in the genus Hemigrammocapoeta. It reaches up to 12 cm (4.7 in) in total length.

It is threatened by habitat loss, particularly due to water pollution and unsustainable water extraction for agriculture. Droughts perhaps exacerbated by climate change and invasive species also pose problems. Though the populations in lakes generally hold their own, most of these are small and susceptible to catastrophic fish kills; only the Lake Kinneret population appears to be stable. The river populations, on the other hand, are declining. Therefore, this species is classified as Near Threatened by the IUCN.
